= List of Harlequin Romance novels released in 1965 =

This is a list of Harlequin Romance novels released in 1965. (Main index: List of Harlequin Romance novels)

== Releases ==
Number	Title	Author	Date	Citations
# 881	Don't Marry A Doctor	Marguerite Lees	January 1965	
# 882	For Love Of A Surgeon	Hilda Nickson	January 1965	
# 883	Nurse Trudie Is Engaged	Marjorie Norrell	January 1965	
# 884	Nurse At Cap Flamingo/Cap Flamingo	Violet Winspear	January 1965	
# 885	At The Villa Massina	Celine Conway	January 1965	
# 886	Bachelors Galore	Essie Summers	January 1965	
# 887	Lake Of Shadows	Jane Arbor	January 1965	
# 888	Heart Of A Rose	Rachel Lindsay	January 1965	
# 889	For Love Of Doctor David / A Friend Of The Family	Lilian Chisholm	February 1965	
# 890	Two Sisters	Valerie K. Nelson	February 1965	
# 891	The Hospital World Of Susan Wray	Anne Lorraine	February 1965	
# 892	The Local Doctor / The House Of The Swallows	Juliet Armstrong	February 1965	
# 893	Sweet Deceiver	Kathryn Blair	February 1965	
# 894	The Third In The House	Joyce Dingwell	February 1965	
# 895	And Falsely Pledge My Love	Mary Burchell	February 1965	
# 896	Child Friday	Sara Seale	February 1965	
# 897	Nurse Hilary's Holiday Task	Jan Haye	March 1965	
# 898	Doctor Robert Comes Around / My Dream Is Yours	Nan Asquith	March 1965	
# 899	Ann Bell, Nursing Aide / The Magic Moment	Gladys Fullbrook	March 1965	
# 900	There Came A Surgeon	Hilda Pressley	March 1965	
# 901	Hope For Tomorrow	Anne Weale	March 1965	
# 902	Mountain Of Dreams	Barbara Rowan	March 1965	
# 903	So Loved And So Far	Elizabeth Hoy	March 1965	
# 904	Moon At The Full	Susan Barrie	March 1965	
# 905	Doctor Down Under	Anne Vinton	April 1965	
# 906	Nurse Molly	Marjorie Norrell	April 1965	
# 907	Two For The Doctor / Homecoming Heart	Joan Blair	April 1965	
# 908	Elizabeth Browne, Children's Nurse	Rosalind Brett	April 1965	
# 909	Desert Doorway	Pamela Kent	April 1965	
# 910	The Master Of Tawhai	Essie Summers	April 1965	
# 911	Return of Simon	Celine Conway	April 1965	
# 912	The Dream And The Dancer	Eleanor Farnes	April 1965	
# 913	Doctors Three	Marion Collin	May 1965	
# 914	Doctor In Malaya	Anne Weale	May 1965	
# 915	The Strange Quest of Nurse Anne	Mary Burchell	May 1965	
# 916	Doctor Vannard's Patients	Pauline Ash	May 1965	
# 917	The Timber Man	Joyce Dingwell	May 1965	
# 918	These Delights	Sara Seale	May 1965	
# 919	Dear Intruder	Jane Arbor	May 1965	
# 920	The Man At Mulera	Kathryn Blair	May 1965	
# 921	Desert Doctor	Violet Winspear	June 1965	
# 922	The Taming Of Nurse Conway	Nora Sanderson	June 1965	
# 923	Kit Cavendish, Private Nurse	Margaret Malcolm	June 1965	
# 924	Doctor Jonathan	Jane Alan	June 1965	
# 925	Homeward The Heart	Elizabeth Hoy	June 1965	
# 926	Mountain Magic	Susan Barrie	June 1965	
# 927	The Scars Shall Fade	Nerina Hilliard	June 1965	
# 928	The Garden Of Don Jose	Rose Burghley	June 1965	
# 929	Hospital Of Bamboo	Juliet Shore	July 1965	
# 930	Staff Nurse Sally / There's Always Someone	Marjorie Norrell	July 1965	
# 931	Charge Nurse / Mr. Sister	Hilary Neal	July 1965	
# 932	Nurse's Dilemma	Hilda Pressley	July 1965	
# 933	Bride In Flight	Essie Summers	July 1965	
# 934	My Dear Cousin	Celine Conway	July 1965	
# 935	A House For Sharing	Isobel Chace	July 1965	
# 936	Tiger Hall	Esther Wyndham	July 1965	
# 937	The Case For Nurse Sheridan	Nora Sanderson	August 1965	
# 938	The Doctor Is Indifferent	Juliet Armstrong	August 1965	
# 939	Doctor's Daughter	Jean S. MacLeod	August 1965	
# 940	Substitute Nurse	Valerie K. Nelson	August 1965	
# 941	Mayenga Farm	Kathryn Blair	August 1965	
# 942	The House By the Lake	Eleanor Farnes	August 1965	
# 943	Enemy Lover	Pamela Kent	August 1965	
# 944	Whisper Of Doubt	Andrea Blake	August 1965	
# 945	Doctor Sandy	Margaret Malcolm	September 1965	
# 946	Nurse Judith's Engagement / Phantom Rival	Marjorie Norrell	September 1965	
# 947	Nurse Jane At Sea / A Woman Alone	Margaret Baumann	September 1965	
# 948	Islands Of Summer	Anne Weale	September 1965	
# 949	The Third Uncle	Sara Seale	September 1965	
# 950	Kingfisher Tide	Jane Arbor	September 1965	
# 951	The Enchanted Trap	Kate Starr	September 1965	
# 952	A Cottage In Spain	Rosalind Brett	September 1965	
# 953	Alex Rayner, Dental Nurse	Marjorie Lewty	October 1965	
# 954	Doctor Westland	Kathryn Blair	October 1965	
# 955	Nurse With A Problem	Jane Marnay	October 1965	
# 956	Take Me With You	Mary Burchell	October 1965	
# 957	No Legacy For Lindsay	Essie Summers	October 1965	
# 958	Young Bar	Jane Fraser	October 1965	
# 959	Who Loves Believes	Elizabeth Hoy	October 1965	
# 960	Man Of Destiny	Rose Burghley	October 1965	
# 961	Nurse Jane And Cousin Paul	Valerie K. Nelson	November 1965	
# 962	Nurse Madeline of Eden Grove	Marjorie Norrell	November 1965	
# 963	Nurse Willow's Ward	Jan Tempest	November 1965	
# 964	Project Sweetheart	Joyce Dingwell	November 1965	
# 965	Came A Stranger	Celine Conway	November 1965	
# 966	Crane Castle	Jean S. MacLeod	November 1965	
# 967	The Wings Of The Morning	Susan Barrie	November 1965	
# 968	Sweet Brenda / Sweet Gooseberry	Penelope Walsh	November 1965	
# 969	Nurse Afloat	Jane Marnay	December 1965	
# 970	Challenge To Nurse Honor	Pauline Ash	December 1965	
# 971	Nurse Rivers' Secret	Anne Durham	December 1965	
# 972	Barbary Moon	Kathryn Blair	December 1965	
# 973	Time Of Grace	Sara Seale	December 1965	
# 974	The Night Of The Hurricane	Andrea Blake	December 1965	
# 975	Sister Of The Housemaster	Eleanor Farnes	December 1965	
# 976	Flamingoes On The Lake	Isobel Chace	December 1965	
