= List of Harlequin Romance novels released in 1966 =

This is a list of Harlequin Romance novels released in 1966. (Main index: List of Harlequin Romance novels)

== Releases ==
Number	Title	Author	Date	Citations
# 977	The Doctor's Difficult Daughter	Jan Haye	January 1966	
# 978	Dr. Gregory Misunderstands	Margaret Malcolm	January 1966	
# 979	Doctor Overboard	Catherine Airlie	January 1966	
# 980	A Song Begins	Mary Burchell	January 1966	
# 981	Christina Comes To Town	Anne Weale	January 1966	
# 982	No Orchids By Request	Essie Summers	January 1966	
# 983	Moon Over Africa	Pamela Kent	January 1966	
# 984	Island In The Dawn	Averil Ives	January 1966	
# 985	Lady In Harley Street	Anne Vinton	February 1966	
# 986	Surgeon At Witteringham	Hilda Nickson	February 1966	
# 987	Senior Staff Nurse	Hilda Pressley	February 1966	
# 988	The Primrose Bride	Kathryn Blair	February 1966	
# 989	Hotel Mirador	Rosalind Brett	February 1966	
# 990	The Wolf Of Heimra	Jean S. MacLeod	February 1966	
# 991	Charity Child	Sara Seale	February 1966	
# 992	Snare The Wild Heart	Elizabeth Hoy	February 1966	
# 993	Send For Nurse Alison	Marjorie Norrell	March 1966	
# 994	Jubilee Hospital	Jan Tempest	March 1966	
# 995	Nurse Ronnie's Vocation	Felicity Hayle	March 1966	
# 996	Perchance To Marry	Celine Conway	March 1966	
# 997	Castle Thunderbird	Susan Barrie	March 1966	
# 998	Magic Symphony	Eleanor Farnes	March 1966	
# 999	Greenfingers Farm	Joyce Dingwell	March 1966	
# 1000	A Girl Named Smith	Jane Arbor	March 1966	
# 1001	No Place For Surgeons	Elizabeth Gilzean	April 1966	
# 1002	A Doctor For Diana	Margaret Malcolm	April 1966	
# 1003	The Heart Cannot Forget	Mary Burchell	April 1966	
# 1004	The Path Of The Moonfish	Betty Beaty	April 1966	
# 1005	Gideon Faber's Chance	Pamela Kent	April 1966	
# 1006	The Courageous Heart	Jane Marnay	April 1966	
# 1007	The Feast Of Sara	Anne Weale	April 1966	
# 1008	Bride's Dilemma	Violet Winspear	April 1966	
# 1009	Nurse At Fairchilds	Marjorie Norrell	May 1966	
# 1010	Doctor Of Research	Elizabeth Houghton	May 1966	
# 1011	The Turquoise Sea	Hilary Wilde	May 1966	
# 1012	No Other Haven	Kathryn Blair	May 1966	
# 1013	Mary Into Mair	Jane Ray	May 1966	
# 1014	House Of Lorraine	Rachel Lindsay	May 1966	
# 1015	Sweet Are The Ways	Essie Summers	May 1966	
# 1016	Two Paths	Jean S. MacLeod	May 1966	
# 1017	Attached To Doctor Marchmont	Juliet Shore	June 1966	
# 1018	Hospital In The Tropics	Gladys Fullbrook	June 1966	
# 1019	Flower Of The Morning	Celine Conway	June 1966	
# 1020	No Just Cause	Susan Barrie	June 1966	
# 1021	Folly To Be Wise	Sara Seale	June 1966	
# 1022	Young Ellis	Margery Hilton	June 1966	
# 1023	The Sweet Surrender	Rose Burghley	June 1966	
# 1024	The House Of Discontent	Esther Wyndham	June 1966	
# 1025	Surgery In The Hills	Ivy Ferrari	July 1966	
# 1026	Doctor In Corsica	Elizabeth Gilzean	July 1966	
# 1027	The Lonely Shore	Anne Weale	July 1966	
# 1028	The Master Of Normanhurst	Margaret Malcolm	July 1966	
# 1029	Choose Which You Will	Mary Burchell	July 1966	
# 1030	The Black Benedicts	Anita Charles	July 1966	
# 1031	Flowering Desert	Elizabeth Hoy	July 1966	
# 1032	Beloved Tyrant	Violet Winspear	July 1966	
# 1033	With Love From Dr. Lucien	Pauline Ash	August 1966	
# 1034	Nurse Meg's Decision	Hilary Neal	August 1966	
# 1035	Star Creek	Pamela Kent	August 1966	
# 1036	The Outback Man	Amanda Doyle	August 1966	
# 1037	The Tender Glory	Jean S. MacLeod	August 1966	
# 1038	Battle Of Love	Kathryn Blair	August 1966	
# 1039	The Taming Of Laura	Rachel Lindsay	August 1966	
# 1040	The Rhythm Of Flamenco	Isobel Chace	August 1966	
# 1041	Nurse Averil's Ward	Mary Hunton	September 1966	
# 1042	Promise The Doctor	Marjorie Norrell	September 1966	
# 1043	Marry A Stranger	Susan Barrie	September 1966	
# 1044	Paradise Island	Hilary Wilde	September 1966	
# 1045	Green Girl	Sara Seale	September 1966	
# 1046	Three Women	Celine Conway	September 1966	
# 1047	Master Of Hearts	Averil Ives	September 1966	
# 1048	High Master Of Clere	Jane Arbor	September 1966	
# 1049	The Youngest Night Nurse	Anne Durham	October 1966	
# 1050	Nurse Adele	Hilda Nickson	October 1966	
# 1051	Bride Of Alaine	Rose Burghley	October 1966	
# 1052	Meant For Each Other	Mary Burchell	October 1966	
# 1053	The Japanese Lantern	Isobel Chace	October 1966	
# 1054	My Tender Fury	Margaret Malcolm	October 1966	
# 1055	Heir To Windrush Hill	Essie Summers	October 1966	
# 1056	One Coin In The Fountain	Anita Charles	October 1966	
# 1057	Lesley Bowen, M.D.	Marjorie Norrell	November 1966	
# 1058	Nurse At Rowanbank	Flora Kidd	November 1966	
# 1059	The Tulip Tree	Kathryn Blair	November 1966	
# 1060	Huntsman's Folly	Alex Stuart	November 1966	
# 1061	Meet Me In Istanbul	Pamela Kent	November 1966	
# 1062	One Summer's Day	Catherine Airlie	November 1966	
# 1063	The Man From Rhodesia	Ruth Clemence	November 1966	
# 1064	Mistress Of The House	Eleanor Farnes	November 1966	
# 1065	Student Nurse at Swale	Pauline Ash	December 1966	
# 1066	Nurse At Ste. Monique	Juliet Armstrong	December 1966	
# 1067	Terrace In The Sun	Anne Weale	December 1966	
# 1068	The Dutch Uncle	Margery Hilton	December 1966	
# 1069	The Man From The Valley	Joyce Dingwell	December 1966	
# 1070	The Drummer Of Corrae	Jean S. MacLeod	December 1966	
# 1071	Spiced With Cloves	Elizabeth Hunter	December 1966	
# 1072	The Young Amanda	Sara Seale	December 1966	
