= List of Harlequin Romance novels released in 1964 =

This is a list of Harlequin Romance novels released in 1964. (Main index: List of Harlequin Romance novels)

== Releases ==
Number	Title	Author	Date	Citations
# 785	The Surgeon's Marriage	Kathryn Blair	January 1964	
# 786	A Ring For A Doctor	Anne Lorraine	January 1964	
# 787	The Two Faces Of Nurse Roberts	Nora Sanderson	January 1964	
# 788	The Gentle Surgeon	Hilda Pressley	January 1964	
# 789	Country Of The Heart	Catherine Airlie	January 1964	
# 790	South To The Sun	Betty Beaty	January 1964	
# 791	City Of Palms	Pamela Kent	January 1964	
# 792	Gates Of Dawn	Susan Barrie	January 1964	
# 793	The Starched Cap	Valerie K. Nelson	February 1964	
# 794	Surgeon's Return	Hilda Nickson	February 1964	
# 795	Hospital Technician / Back Room Girl	Marguerite Lees	February 1964	
# 796	Nurse Incognito / Hibiscus House	Faye Chandos	February 1964	
# 797	The Black Cameron	Jean S. MacLeod	February 1964	
# 798	If This Is Love	Anne Weale	February 1964	
# 799	Love Is For Ever	Barbara Rowan	February 1964	
# 800	Sweet Waters	Rosalind Brett	February 1964	
# 801	Desert Nurse	Jane Arbor	March 1964	
# 802	Nurse Mary's Engagement/South To Forget	Essie Summers	March 1964	
# 803	Model Nurse	Ivy Ferrari	March 1964	
# 804	Doctor Gaston / Bladon's Rock	Pamela Kent	March 1964	
# 805	Love This Enemy	Kathryn Blair	March 1964	
# 806	The Golden Peaks	Eleanor Farnes	March 1964	
# 807	Full Tide	Celine Conway	March 1964	
# 808	The Girl At Snowy River	Joyce Dingwell	March 1964	
# 809	Send For Nurse Vincent	Margaret Malcolm	April 1964	
# 810	Doctor Of Rhua / The Piper Of Laide	Alex Stuart	April 1964	
# 811	Nurse Harriet Comes Home / The Way to the Wedding	Joan Blair	April 1964	
# 812	Factory Nurse	Hilary Neal	April 1964	
# 813	The Wedding Dress	Mary Burchell	April 1964	
# 814	A Long Way From Home	Jane Fraser	April 1964	
# 815	Young Tracy	Rosalind Brett	April 1964	
# 816	The Youngest Bridesmaid	Sara Seale	April 1964	
# 817	The Hand Of Fate	Anne Vinton	May 1964	
# 818	Second Year Nurse	Valerie K. Nelson	May 1964	
# 819	Nurse Saxon's Patient	Marjorie Norrell	May 1964	
# 820	The World Of Nurse Mitchell	Hilda Nickson	May 1964	
# 821	The Wild Land	Isobel Chace	May 1964	
# 822	The Time And The Place	Essie Summers	May 1964	
# 823	Dear Adversary	Kathryn Blair	May 1964	
# 824	Amber Five	Betty Beaty	May 1964	
# 825	Make Up Your Mind, Nurse	Phyllis Matthewman	June 1964	
# 826	Doctor's Assistant	Celine Conway	June 1964	
# 827	Sheila Of Children's Ward	Margaret Baumann	June 1964	
# 828	Ship's Doctor	Kate Starr	June 1964	
# 829	Sweet Barbary	Pamela Kent	June 1964	
# 830	All I Ask	Anne Weale	June 1964	
# 831	Hotel At Treloan / Hotel Stardust	Susan Barrie	June 1964	
# 832	No Silver Spoon	Jane Arbor	June 1964	
# 833	Seaside Hospital	Pauline Ash	July 1964	
# 834	Nurse Annabel	Valerie K. Nelson	July 1964	
# 835	Part-Time Nurse/Part-Time Angel	Elizabeth Houghton	July 1964	
# 836	Doctor Phillip / He Whom I Love	Hilda Nickson	July 1964	
# 837	Away Went Love	Mary Burchell	July 1964	
# 838	Dear Dragon	Sara Seale	July 1964	
# 839	Tangle In Sunshine	Rosalind Brett	July 1964	
# 840	The House Of Adriano	Nerina Hilliard	July 1964	
# 841	Truant Heart / Doctor in Brazil	Patricia Fenwick	August 1964	
# 842	Nurse Barby's Secret Love	Margaret Baumann	August 1964	
# 843	A Nurse At Barbazon / The Summer At Barbazon	Kathryn Blair	August 1964	
# 844	Nurse Allison's Trust / Meet Me Again	Mary Burchell	August 1964	
# 845	Flower For A Bride	Barbara Rowan	August 1964	
# 846	Above The Clouds	Esther Wyndham	August 1964	
# 847	The Smoke And The Fire	Essie Summers	August 1964	
# 848	The Keeper's House	Jane Fraser	August 1964	
# 849	A Nurse For Mr. Henderson	Anne Lorraine	September 1964	
# 850	Nurse Anne's Impersonation / The Other Anne	Caroline Trench	September 1964	
# 851	Nurse Carol's Decision / A Song For Tomorrow	Lilian Chisholm	September 1964	
# 852	Nurse Julia Of Queen Frida's/ The Fair Stranger	Valerie K. Nelson	September 1964	
# 853	Sugar Island	Jean S. MacLeod	September 1964	
# 854	Tender Conquest	Joyce Dingwell	September 1964	
# 855	Until We Met	Anne Weale	September 1964	
# 856	Too Young To Marry	Rosalind Brett	September 1964	
# 857	Island Doctor / The Quiet Spot	Olga Gillman	October 1964	
# 858	My Surgeon Neighbor / No Lease for Love	Jane Arbor	October 1964	
# 859	Nurse In Ireland / Irish Rose	Bethea Creese	October 1964	
# 860	Nurse At The Top	Marion Collin	October 1964	
# 861	Bewildered Heart	Kathryn Blair	October 1964	
# 862	Moon Over The Alps	Essie Summers	October 1964	
# 863	The Blue Caribbean	Celine Conway	October 1964	
# 864	Now And Always	Andrea Blake	October 1964	
# 865	A Partner For Doctor Philip	Nora Sanderson	November 1964	
# 866	Doctor Luke / Hearts Go Singing	Lilian Chisholm	November 1964	
# 867	Dr. Colin's Obsession / Elusive Lady	Anne Lorraine	November 1964	
# 868	Emergency For Doctor Bill / This Starry Stranger	Peta Cameron	November 1964	
# 869	The Reluctant Guest	Rosalind Brett	November 1964	
# 870	The Dark Stranger	Sara Seale	November 1964	
# 871	Yours To Command	Mary Burchell	November 1964	
# 872	Haven Of The Heart	Averil Ives	November 1964	
# 873	Nurse Julie Of Ward Three	Joan Callender	December 1964	
# 874	Nurse At Ryeminster	Ivy Ferrari	December 1964	
# 875	Doctor David Advises	Hilary Wilde	December 1964	
# 876	Serenade For Doctor Bray	Juliet Shore	December 1964	
# 877	Dangerous Waters	Rosalind Brett	December 1964	
# 878	This Kind Of Love / The Dangerous Kind Of Love	Kathryn Blair	December 1964	
# 879	Sweet To Remember	Anne Weale	December 1964	
# 880	Once You Have Found Him	Esther Wyndham	December 1964	
