= List of Harlequin Romance novels released in 1962 =

This is a list of Harlequin Romance novels released in 1962. (Main index: List of Harlequin Romance novels)

== Releases ==
Number	Title	Author	Date	Citations
# 636	The House At Hawk's Nest (Nurse Candida)	Caroline Trench	1962	
# 637	Career Nurse	Anne Lorraine	1962	
# 638	Mountain Clinic	Jean S. MacLeod	1962	
# 639	Nurse In Spain	Alex Stuart	1962	
# 640	Spencer's Hospital	Alex Stuart	1962	
# 641	There Goes My Heart (Hospital Secretary)	Margaret Baumann	1962	
# 642	The White Jacket	Kate Norway	1962	
# 643	A Life To Share	Hilary Preston	1962	
# 644	Never To Love	Anne Weale	1962	
# 645	The Gentle Prisoner	Sara Seale	1962	
# 646	Nurse In Waiting	Jane Arbor	1962	
# 647	Jungle Hospital	Juliet Shore	1962	
# 648	Gray's Hospital	Joan Blair	1962	
# 649	Kate Of Outpatients	Elizabeth Gilzean	1962	
# 650	The Golden Rose	Kathryn Blair	1962	
# 651	Dangerous Obsession	Jean S. MacLeod	1962	
# 652	Diana Drake, M.D.	Lilian Chisholm	1962	
# 653	The Waiting Room	Bess Norton	1962	
# 654	Cherry-Blossom Clinic	Elizabeth Hunter	1962	
# 655	Outpost Hospital	Sheila Ridley	1962	
# 656	Stormy Haven	Rosalind Brett	1962	
# 657	Orphan Bride	Sara Seale	1962	
# 658	Reluctant Relation	Mary Burchell	1962	
# 659	Gone Away	Marjorie Moore	1962	
# 660	Doctor Raoul's Romance	Penelope Butler	1962	
# 661	Doctor's Ward	Sara Seale	1962	
# 662	Tread Softly, Nurse	Hilary Neal	1962	
# 663	In Care Of The Doctor	Barbara Rowan	1962	
# 664	Love For The Matron	Elizabeth Houghton	1962	
# 665	A Problem For Doctor Brett	Marjorie Norrell	1962	
# 666	Love...The Surgeon	Hilda Pressley	1962	
# 667	Nurse Laurie	Kathryn Blair	1962	
# 668	No Roses In June	Essie Summers	1962	
# 669	A Cruise For Cinderella	Alex Stuart	1962	
# 670	Operation Love	Hilda Nickson	1962	
# 671	Heart Deep	Margaret Baumann	1962	
# 672	Gregor Lothian, Surgeon	Joan Blair	1962	
# 673	Gateway To Happiness (Village Clinic)	Anne Cameron	1962	
# 674	The Silver Dragon	Jean S. MacLeod	1962	
# 675	Wide Pastures	Celine Conway	1962	
# 676	Doctor Venables' Practice	Anne Vinton	1962	
# 677	The Doctor Next Door	Lilian Chisholm	1962	
# 678	Doctor In The Tropics	Vivian Stuart	1962	
# 679	The Nurse Most Likely	Kate Starr	1962	
# 680	Black Charles	Esther Wyndham	1962	
# 681	I'll Never Marry!	Juliet Armstrong	1962	
# 682	Plantation Doctor	Kathryn Blair	1962	
# 683	Doctor's Desire	Averil Ives	1962	
# 684	Doctor On Horseback	Alex Stuart	1962	
# 685	Doctor Mark Temple	Elizabeth Gilzean	1962	
# 686	Stolen Heart	Mary Burchell	1962	
# 687	Four Roads To Windrush	Susan Barrie	1962	
# 688	Stevie, Student Nurse	Marguerite Lees	1962	
# 689	Nurse In India	Juliet Armstrong	1962	
# 690	Nurse Of All Work	Jane Arbor	1962	
# 691	Doctor Benedict	Joyce Dingwell	1962	
# 692	The Only Charity	Sara Seale	1962	
# 693	Towards The Sun	Rosalind Brett	1962	
# 694	Football Today And Yesteryear	Tony Allan	1962	
# 695	Vengeance Of The Black Donnellys	Thomas P. Kelley	1962	
# 696	Staff Nurses In Love	Hilda Pressley	1962	
# 697	Glorious Haven (Patient In Love)	Bethea Creese	1962	
# 698	Good Night, Nurse	Anne Lorraine	1962	
# 699	The Doctor Is Engaged	Nan Asquith	1962	
# 700	Tamarisk Bay	Kathryn Blair	1962	
# 701	Strange Loyalties (Doctor's Love)	Jane Arbor	1962	
# 702	Surgeons In Love	Hilda Nickson	1962	
# 703	Course Of True Love (Doctor Grant Of Bonnybraes)	Joan Blair	1962	
# 704	Private Case	Marguerite Lees	1962	
# 705	The Last Of The Logans	Alex Stuart	1962	
# 706	Peace River Country	Ralph Allen	1962	
