= List of Harlequin Romance novels released in 1963 =

This is a list of Harlequin Romance novels released in 1963. (Main index: List of Harlequin Romance novels)

== Releases ==
Number	Title	Author	Date	Citations
# 707	Holiday Hospital	Juliet Shore	1963	
# 708	Calling Nurse Grant	Lilian Chisholm	1963	
# 709	Senior Surgeon At St. David's	Elizabeth Gilzean	1963	
# 710	A Nurse Is Born	Bess Norton	1963	
# 711	My Heart's In The Highlands	Jean S. MacLeod	1963	
# 712	House Of Conflict	Mary Burchell	1963	
# 713	Harvest Of The Heart / Nurse Of My Heart	Jill Christian	1963	
# 714	Young Nurse Payne	Valerie K. Nelson	1963	
# 715	The Heart Of A Hospital	Anne Vinton	1963	
# 716	The Doctor's Daughters	Anne Weale	1963	
# 717	The House At Tegwani	Kathryn Blair	1963	
# 718	All This Difference	Dorothy Dumbrille	1963	
# 719	Forbidden Island	Sara Seale	1963	
# 720	General Hospital	Marguerite Lees	1963	
# 721	Ship's Surgeon	Celine Conway	1963	
# 722	Doctor's Orders	Eleanor Farnes	1963	
# 723	Fortune Goes Begging (Nurse Langridge, Heiress)	Margaret Malcolm	1963	
# 724	House Of The Shining Tide	Essie Summers	1963	
# 725	The Song And The Sea	Isobel Chace	1963	
# 726	Surgeon For Tonight	Elizabeth Houghton	1963	
# 727	Nurses Of The Tourist Service	Gladys Fullbrook	1963	
# 728	Reluctant Nurse	Anne Lorraine	1963	
# 729	Surgeons At Arms	Mary Hunton	1963	
# 730	The Stars Of San Cecilio	Susan Barrie	1963	
# 731	Whispering Palms	Rosalind Brett	1963	
# 732	River Nurse	Joyce Dingwell	1963	
# 733	Stevie, Staff Nurse	Marguerite Lees	1963	
# 734	Doctor Andrew, Guardian	Olga Gillman	1963	
# 735	Quayside Hospital	Hilda Nickson	1963	
# 736	The Tall Pines	Celine Conway	1963	
# 737	Maiden Flight	Betty Beaty	1963	
# 738	Send For Doctor	Anne Lorraine	1963	
# 739	When The Heart Is Young (When A Nurse Is Young)	Lilian Chisholm	1963	
# 740	Nurse On Holiday	Rosalind Brett	1963	
# 741	Journey Into Yesterday (Nurse At Hand)	Marjorie Ellison	1963	
# 742	Come Blossom-Time, My Love	Essie Summers	1963	
# 743	The House On Flamingo Cay	Anne Weale	1963	
# 744	Verena Fayre, Probationer	Valerie K. Nelson	1963	
# 745	Tender Nurse	Hilda Nickson	1963	
# 746	Nurse Marika, Loyal In All (Loyal In All)	Mary Burchell	1963	
# 747	Lucy Lamb, Doctor's Wife	Sara Seale	1963	
# 748	The Valley Of Palms	Jean S. MacLeod	1963	
# 749	Wild Crocus	Kathryn Blair	1963	
# 750	A Nurse About The Place	Anne Lorraine	1963	
# 751	Night Superintendent	Hilda Pressley	1963	
# 752	The Ordeal Of Nurse Thompson	Nora Sanderson	1963	
# 753	Doctor Max	Eleanor Farnes	1963	
# 754	The Rancher Needs A Wife	Celine Conway	1963	
# 755	September In Paris	Andrea Blake	1963	
# 756	Ward Hostess	Marguerite Lees	1963	
# 757	The Palm-Thatched Hospital	Juliet Shore	1963	
# 758	Helping Doctor Medway	Jan Haye	1963	
# 759	No Regrets (Young Doctor Ashley)	Marjorie Norrell	1963	
# 760	Fair Horizon	Rosalind Brett	1963	
# 761	The House In The Timberwoods	Joyce Dingwell	1963	
# 762	Hospital In New Zealand	Nora Sanderson	1963	
# 763	A Surgical Affair	Shirley Summerskill	1963	
# 764	Nurse Ann Wood	Valerie K. Nelson	1963	
# 765	A Case Of Heart Trouble	Susan Barrie	1963	
# 766	The Enchanting Island	Kathryn Blair	1963	
# 767	The Silver Dolphin	Anne Weale	1963	
# 768	Never A Day So Bright	Kate Aitken	1963	
# 769	Nursing Auxiliary	Marguerite Lees	1963	
# 770	Nurse Margaret's Big Mistake	Anne Vinton	1963	
# 771	Nurse Prue In Ceylon	Gladys Fullbrook	1963	
# 772	Chloe Wilde, Student Nurse	Joan Turner	1963	
# 773	Winds In The Wilderness	Rosalind Brett	1963	
# 774	Heatherleigh	Essie Summers	1963	
# 775	That Nice Nurse Nevin	Jan Tempest	1963	
# 776	Nurse Foster's Foolish Heart	Hilda Nickson	1963	
# 777	Scatterbrains-Student Nurse	Margaret Malcolm	December 1963	
# 778	A Case In The Alps	Margaret Baumann	December 1963	
# 779	Mistress Of Brown Furrows	Susan Barrie	December 1963	
# 780	Jasmine Harvest	Jane Arbor	December 1963	
# 781	Then She Fled Me	Sara Seale	December 1963	
# 782	Inherit My Heart	Mary Burchell	December 1963	
# 783	Portrait Of Susan	Rosalind Brett	December 1963	
# 784	Where No Roads Go	Essie Summers	December 1963	
