= List of Harlequin Romance novels released in 1961 =

This is a list of Harlequin Romance novels released in 1961. (Main index: List of Harlequin Romance novels)

== Releases ==
Number	Title	Author	Date	Citations
# 563	Hospital In The Highlands	Anne Vinton	1961	
# 564	Doctor To The Isles	Juliet Shore	1961	
# 565	Paris, And My Love	Mary Burchell	1961	
# 566	Jungle Doctor	Vivian Stuart	1961	
# 567	Spring Comes To Harley Street (Harley Street Surgeon)	Dorothy Rivers	1961	
# 568	Nurse At Sea	Juliet Shore	1961	
# 569	Wife To Doctor Dan	Hilary Darke	1961	
# 570	Night Nurse	Hilda Pressley	1961	
# 571	Children Hospital	Elizabeth Gilzean	1961	
# 572	So Dear To My Heart	Susan Barrie	1961	
# 573	Dear Fugitive	Elizabeth Hoy	1961	
# 574	Along Came Doctor Ann	Vivian Stuart	1961	
# 575	The Year Of Waiting (Doctor Standing)	Jane Beech	1961	
# 576	Sandflower	Jane Arbor	1961	
# 577	White Hunter	Elizabeth Hoy	1961	
# 578	Nurse Templar	Anne Weale	1961	
# 579	Nurse Angela	Hilary Preston	1961	
# 580	Nurse Nolan	Susan Barrie	1961	
# 581	Yankee Surgeon	Elizabeth Gilzean	1961	
# 582	Winter Is Past	Anne Weale	1961	
# 583	This Merry Bond	Sara Seale	1961	
# 584	The Healing Touch (Village Hospital)	Margaret Malcolm	1961	
# 585	Nurse To The Cruise	Anne Vinton	1961	
# 586	Cameron Of Gare	Jean S. MacLeod	1961	
# 587	Heart Specialist	Susan Barrie	1961	
# 588	Island Nurse	Georgia Craig	1961	
# 589	The Doctor's Challenge	Marjorie Moore	1961	
# 590	First, The Doctor	Anne Lorraine	1961	
# 591	Hotel Nurse	Anne Lorraine	1961	
# 592	Marriage Compromise	Margaret Malcolm	1961	
# 593	Lucifer's Angel	Violet Winspear	1961	
# 594	Doctor Sara Comes Home	Elizabeth Houghton	1961	
# 595	Emergency Nurse	Anne Lorraine	1961	
# 596	Hope For The Doctor	Margaret Malcolm	1961	
# 597	Special Nurse	Jean S. MacLeod	1961	
# 598	Doctor Mary Courage	Alex Stuart	1961	
# 599	Run Away From Love (Nurse Companion)	Jean S. MacLeod	1961	
# 600	Hospital Librarian (Note: Originally published in hardcover as: Jan Marlowe, Hospital Librarian)	Margaret Malcolm	July 1961	
# 601	Nurse Nicky	Lilian Chisholm	1961	
# 602	Repent At Leisure	Joan Walker	1961	
# 603	Across The Counter	Mary Burchell	1961	
# 604	Flight To The Stars	Pamela Kent	1961	
# 605	Dear Sir	Mary Burchell	1961	
# 606	Silent Bondage (Doctor In Bondage)	Jean S. MacLeod	1961	
# 607	The Corla Tree (Doctor's Prejudice)	Joyce Dingwell	1961	
# 608	White-Coated Girl	Anne Lorraine	1961	
# 609	Copper Beeches (Doctor's Secretary)	Marjorie Moore	1961	
# 610	Doctor At Hilltops	Lilian Chisholm	1961	
# 611	Nurse Blade's First Week	Mary Hunton	1961	
# 612	Patient For Doctor Gaird	Anne Lorraine	1961	
# 613	Nurse In The House	Margaret Malcolm	1961	
# 614	Island For Sale	Alex Stuart	1961	
# 615	Summer Lightning	Jill Tahourdin	1961	
# 616	Love Him Or Leave Him	Mary Burchell	1961	
# 617	And Be Thy Love	Rose Burghley	1961	
# 618	Doctor Di At The Crossroads	Anne Vinton	1961	
# 619	Staff Nurse On Gynae	Hilda Pressley	1961	
# 620	White Doctor	Celine Conway	1961	
# 621	Nurse To Captain Andy	Jill Christian	1961	
# 622	Football Flashbacks	Tony Allan	1961	
# 623	Thursday Clinic	Anne Lorraine	1961	
# 624	Nurse Linnet's Release	Averil Ives	1961	
# 625	Nurse Abroad	Essie Summers	1961	
# 626	Nurse Trent's Children	Joyce Dingwell	1961	
# 627	With All My Worldly Goods	Mary Burchell	1961	
# 628	The House Of The Laird	Susan Barrie	1961	
# 629	To Love Again	Denise Robins	1961	
# 630	Stranger In Their Midst	Jean S. MacLeod	1961	
# 631	Doctor's House	Dorothy Rivers	1961	
# 632	Nurse For The Doctor	Averil Ives	1961	
# 633	Children's Nurse	Kathryn Blair	1961	
# 634	Love Without Wings (Surgeon's Wife)	Margaret Malcolm	1961	
# 635	Curling Today	Ken Watson	1961	
