= List of Harlequin Romance novels released in 1960 =

This is a list of Harlequin Romance novels released in 1960. (Main index: List of Harlequin Romance novels)

== Releases ==
Number	Title	Author	Date	Citations
# 502	Blood Of Her Ancestors	Lucy Agnes Hancock	1960	
# 503	Nurse In Charge	Elizabeth Gilzean	1960	
# 504	Peter Raynal, Surgeon	Marjorie Moore	1960	
# 505	Meet Doctor Kettering	Marguerite Lees	1960	
# 506	Queen's Counsel	Alex Stuart	1960	
# 507	It's Wise To Forget	Elizabeth Hoy	1960	
# 508	Senior Surgeon	Marjorie Moore	1960	
# 509	Nurse Secretary	Marjorie Moore	1960	
# 510	Doctor Halcott	Marguerite Lees	1960	
# 511	Strange Recompense	Catherine Airlie	1960	
# 512	Australian Hospital	Joyce Dingwell	1960	
# 513	Far Sanctuary	Jane Arbor	1960	
# 514	The Quiet One (Twin Nurse)	Bess Norton	1960	
# 515	A Case For Nurse Claire	Marguerite Lees	1960	
# 516	Prisoner Of Live	Jean S. MacLeod	1960	
# 517	Journey In The Sun (Doctors Together)	Jean S. MacLeod	1960	
# 518	Hospital In Paradise	Juliet Shore	1960	
# 519	Doctor Pamela	Anne Vinton	1960	
# 520	Doctor Derrington	Marjorie Moore	1960	
# 521	On The Air	Mary Burchell	1960	
# 522	The Living Legend	Alan Philips	1960	
# 523	Doctor Reid	Peggy Gaddis	1960	
# 524	Queen's Nurse	Jane Arbor	1960	
# 525	Nurse Elliot's Diary	Kate Norway	1960	
# 526	When You Have Found Me	Elizabeth Hoy	1960	
# 527	Return To Love	Alex Stuart	1960	
# 528	Wife By Arrangement	Mary Burchell	1960	
# 529	Theatre Nurse	Hilda Pressley	1960	
# 530	Dr. Daring's Love Affair	Anne Vinton	1960	
# 531	Doctor Memsahib	Juliet Shore	1960	
# 532	To Win A Paradise	Elizabeth Hoy	1960	
# 533	Over The Blue Mountains	Mary Burchell	1960	
# 534	Doctor's Wife...In Secret	Anne Vinton	1960	
# 535	Under The Red Cross	Juliet Shore	1960	
# 536	Hospital At Night	Marguerite Lees	1960	
# 537	Castle In Corsica	Anne Weale	1960	
# 538	Strange Request	Marjorie Bassett	1960	
# 539	Hospital On Wheels	Anne Lorraine	1960	
# 540	Village Nurse	Marguerite Lees	1960	
# 541	The Way In The Dark	Jean S. MacLeod	1960	
# 542	City Of Dreams	Elizabeth Hoy	1960	
# 543	The Little Doctor	Jean S. MacLeod	1960	
# 544	Doctor Sara	Peggy Gaddis	1960	
# 545	Nurse Lang	Jean S. MacLeod	1960	
# 546	Choose The One You'll Marry	Mary Burchell	1960	
# 547	The Gated Road	Jean S. MacLeod	1960	
# 548	Psychiatric Nurse	Elizabeth Gilzean	1960	
# 549	Doctor Mary's Mission	Juliet Shore	1960	
# 550	Canadian Etiquette Dictionary	Claire Wallace	1960	
# 551	Grass Roots Nurse	Georgia Craig	1960	
# 552	Caribbean Melody	Peggy Dern	1960	
# 553	The House Of Seven Fountains	Anne Weale	1960	
# 554	My Dear Doctor	Anne Lorraine	1960	
# 555	Love The Physician	Hilda Nickson	1960	
# 556	Staff Nurse In The Tyrol	Elizabeth Houghton	1960	
# 557	The Time Is Short (Nurse Carol's Secret)	Nerina Hilliard	1960	
# 558	Nurse In Malaya	Vivian Stuart	1960	
# 559	Nurse Wayne In The Tropics	Anne Vinton	1960	
# 560	Wintersbride	Sara Seale	1960	
# 561	The Girl Who Kept Faith	Marguerite Lees	1960	
# 562	Christmas Gift	Lucy Agnes Hancock	1960	
