= List of Harlequin Romance novels released in 1958 =

This is a list of Harlequin Romance novels released in 1958. (Main index: List of Harlequin Romance novels)

== Releases ==
Number	Title	Author	Date	Citations
# 409	Hospital Corridors	Mary Burchell	1958	
# 410	Dark Journey	Sydney Horley	1958	
# 411	Range King	J.E. Grinstead	1958	
# 412	Nurse Trenton	Caroline Trench	1958	
# 413	I'll Get You for This	James Hadley Chase	1958	
# 414	Devil's Portage	Charles Stoddard	1958	
# 415	The Normal Child (Note: non-romance)	Dr. Alan Brown and Dr. Elizabeth Chant Robertson	1958	
# 416	Doctor Lucy	Barbara Allen	1958	
# 417	Maverick Guns	J.E. Grinstead	1958 (Note: Reprint)	
# 418	The Feathered Serpent	Edgar Wallace	1958	
# 419	Nurse Warding Takes Charge	Caroline Trench	1958	
# 420	The Squeaker	Edgar Wallace	1958	
# 421	The Golden Amazon's Triumph	John Russell Fearn	1958	
# 422	Then Come Kiss Me	Mary Burchell	1958	
# 423	Nurse Greve	Jane Arbor	1958	
# 424	Flashing Spikes	Frank O'Rourke	1958	
# 425	The Return Of Nighthawk	Sydney Horler	1958	
# 426	The World's Greatest Spy Stories	Kurt Singer	1958	
# 427	Nurse Brookes	Kate Norway	1958	
# 428	The Strange Countess	Edgar Wallace	1958	
# 429	Steele Of The Royal Mounted	James Oliver Curwood	1958	
# 430	Ship's Nurse	Alex Stuart	1958	
# 431	The Silent Valley	Jean S. MacLeod	1958	
# 432	The Lady Lost Her Head	Manning Lee Stokes	1958	
# 433	Because Of Doctor Danville	Elizabeth Hoy	1958	
# 434	Dear Doctor Everett	Jean S. MacLeod	1958	
# 435	Canada's Greatest Crimes	Thomas P. Kelley	1958	
# 436	Garrison Hospital	Alex Stuart	1958	
# 437	Saddlebag Surgeon	Robert Tyre	1958	
# 438	Master Of Surgery	Alex Stuart	1958	
# 439	Hospital In Sudan	Anne Vinton	1958	
# 440	Pardon My Parka	Joan Walker	1958	
# 441	The Murder on the Links	Agatha Christie	1958 (Note: Reprint)	
# 442	Curling With Ken Watson	Ken Watson	1958	
# 443	Nurse On Call	Elizabeth Gilzean	1958	
# 444	Double Dan	Edgar Wallace	1958	
# 445	Nurse In The Tropics	Peggy Dern	1958	
# 446	To Please The Doctor	Marjorie Moore	1958	
