= List of Harlequin Romance novels released in 1982 =

This is a list of Harlequin Romance novels released in 1982. (Main index: List of Harlequin Romance novels)

== Releases ==
| Number | Title | Author | Date | Citations |
|---|---|---|---|---|
| # 2449 | Hotel Jacarandas | Katrina Britt | January 1982 | |
| # 2450 | Beyond The Lagoon | Marjorie Lewty | January 1982 | |
| # 2451 | Bachelor's Wife | Jessica Steele | January 1982 | |
| # 2452 | The Black Invader | Rebecca Stratton | January 1982 | |
| # 2453 | The Tender Leaves | Essie Summers | January 1982 | |
| # 2454 | The McIvor Affair | Margaret Way | January 1982 | |
| # 2455 | Emerald Cave | Gloria Bevan | February 1982 | |
| # 2456 | Flash Point | Jane Donnelly | February 1982 | |
| # 2457 | The Storms Of Spring | Sandra Field | February 1982 | |
| # 2458 | Dream House | Victoria Gordon | February 1982 | |
| # 2459 | Arctic Enemy | Linda Harrel | February 1982 | |
| # 2460 | Dream Island | Roumelia Lane | February 1982 | |
| # 2461 | Land Of Tomorrow | Mons Daveson | March 1982 | |
| # 2462 | Copper's Girl | Rosalie Henaghan | March 1982 | |
| # 2463 | An Apple From Eve | Betty Neels | March 1982 | |
| # 2464 | Castle In Spain | Margaret Rome | March 1982 | |
| # 2465 | Chateau Of Dreams | Catherine Shaw | March 1982 | |
| # 2466 | Dark Enigma | Rebecca Stratton | March 1982 | |
| # 2467 | Invisible Wife | Jane Arbor | April 1982 | |
| # 2468 | No Time For Love | Kay Clifford | April 1982 | |
| # 2469 | Always The Boss | Victoria Gordon | April 1982 | |
| # 2470 | The Bright Side Of Dark | Jeneth Murrey | April 1982 | |
| # 2471 | Dangerous Rapture | Sue Peters | April 1982 | |
| # 2472 | Heart Under Siege | Joy St. Clair | April 1982 | |
| # 2473 | Way Of A Man | Margery Hilton | May 1982 | |
| # 2474 | Divided Loyalties | Margaret Mayo | May 1982 | |
| # 2475 | At First Glance | Margaret Pargeter | May 1982 | |
| # 2476 | North Of Capricorn | Margaret Way | May 1982 | |
| # 2477 | Dangerous To Love | Gwen Westwood | May 1982 | |
| # 2478 | The Spotted Plume | Yvonne Whittal | May 1982 | |
| # 2479 | Mixed Feelings | Kerry Allyne | June 1982 | |
| # 2480 | Sight Of A Stranger | Sandra Field | June 1982 | |
| # 2481 | The Driftwood Beach | Samantha Harvey | June 1982 | |
| # 2482 | Meeting In Madrid | Jean S. MacLeod | June 1982 | |
| # 2483 | Hell Is My Heaven | Jeneth Murrey | June 1982 | |
| # 2484 | Bed Of Roses | Anne Weale | June 1982 | |
| # 2485 | Desert Haven | Roumelia Lane | July 1982 | |
| # 2486 | The Sun And Catriona | Rosemary Pollock | July 1982 | |
| # 2487 | King Of Kielder | Margaret Rome | July 1982 | |
| # 2488 | Play Our Song Again | Lynsey Stevens | July 1982 | |
| # 2489 | The Golden Spaniard | Rebecca Stratton | July 1982 | |
| # 2490 | Home To Morning Star | Margaret Way | July 1982 | |
| # 2491 | Cast A Tender Shadow | Isabel Dix | August 1982 | |
| # 2492 | The Trodden Paths | Jacqueline Gilbert | August 1982 | |
| # 2493 | The Overlord | Susanna Firth | August 1982 | |
| # 2494 | But Know Not Why | Jessica Steele | August 1982 | |
| # 2495 | Race For Revenge | Lynsey Stevens | August 1982 | |
| # 2496 | Stamp Of Possession | Sheila Strutt | August 1982 | |
| # 2497 | My Dear Innocent | Lindsay Armstrong | September 1982 | |
| # 2498 | A Girl Bewitched | Marjorie Lewty | September 1982 | |
| # 2499 | Moreton's Kingdom | Jean S. MacLeod | September 1982 | |
| # 2500 | Judith | Betty Neels | September 1982 | |
| # 2501 | Man Of Teak | Sue Peters | September 1982 | |
| # 2502 | Dishonest Woman | Jessica Steele | September 1982 | |
| # 2503 | White Witch | Elizabeth Ashton | October 1982 | |
| # 2504 | Not To Be Trusted | Jessica Ayre | October 1982 | |
| # 2505 | A Temporary Affair | Kay Clifford | October 1982 | |
| # 2506 | Love Me Again | Alexandra Scott | October 1982 | |
| # 2507 | Tropical Knight | Lynsey Stevens | October 1982 | |
| # 2508 | Charade | Rebecca Stratton | October 1982 | |
| # 2509 | The Price Of Paradise | Jane Arbor | November 1982 | |
| # 2510 | Diamond Cut Diamond | Jane Donnelly | November 1982 | |
| # 2511 | Duquesa By Default | Maura McGiveny | November 1982 | |
| # 2512 | Run Before The Wind | Mary Moore | November 1982 | |
| # 2513 | Valley Of Gentians | Margaret Rome | November 1982 | |
| # 2514 | This Side Of Heaven | Alexandra Scott | November 1982 | |
| # 2515 | Valley Of Lagoons | Kerry Allyne | December 1982 | |
| # 2516 | Pacific Pretence | Daphne Clair | December 1982 | |
| # 2517 | Passionate Enemies | Kathryn Cranmer | December 1982 | |
| # 2518 | The Uncertain Heart | Sheila Douglas | December 1982 | |
| # 2519 | Highlands Rapture | Diana Gair | December 1982 | |
| # 2520 | A Girl To Love | Betty Neels | December 1982 | |
