= List of Harlequin Romance novels released in 1970 =

This is a list of Harlequin Romance novels released in 1970. (Main index: List of Harlequin Romance novels)

== Releases ==
Number	Title	Author	Date	Citations
# 1361	Sister Peters In Amsterdam	Betty Neels	January 1970	
# 1362	Stranger By My Side	Jeanette Welsh	January 1970	
# 1363	Star Dust	Margaret Malcolm	January 1970	
# 1364	One Love	Jean S. MacLeod	January 1970	
# 1365	Hotel Southerly	Joyce Dingwell	January 1970	
# 1366	Design For Loving	Margaret Baumann	January 1970	
# 1367	Interlude In Arcady	Margery Hilton	January 1970	
# 1368	Music I Heard With You	Elizabeth Hoy	January 1970	
# 1369	Nurse Rona Came to Rothmere	Louise Ellis	February 1970	
# 1370	The Ways Of Love	Catherine Airlie	February 1970	
# 1371	Dancing On My Heart	Belinda Dell	February 1970	
# 1372	Isle Of Pomegranates	Iris Danbury	February 1970	
# 1373	The Pied Tulip	Elizabeth Ashton	February 1970	
# 1374	Fortune's Lead	Barbara Perkins	February 1970	
# 1375	The Kindled Fire	Essie Summers	February 1970	
# 1376	Shadows From The Sea	Jane Donnelly	February 1970	
# 1377	Sister Darling	Marjorie Norrell	March 1970	
# 1378	Nurse Smith, Cook / No Females Wanted	Joyce Dingwell	March 1970	
# 1379	A Touch Of Starlight	Rosemary Pollock	March 1970	
# 1380	Reluctant Masquerade	Henrietta Reid	March 1970	
# 1381	Music On The Wind	Dorothy Slide	March 1970	
# 1382	To Journey Together	Mary Burchell	March 1970	
# 1383	A Wife For Andrew	Lucy Gillen	March 1970	
# 1384	Beloved Enemies	Pamela Kent	March 1970	
# 1385	Nurse In Holland / Amazon In An Apron / A Match	Betty Neels	April 1970	
# 1386	Alpine Doctor / The Afterglow	Rose Burghley	April 1970	
# 1387	The House Called Green Bays	Jan Andersen	April 1970	
# 1388	Unwary Heart	Anne Hampson	April 1970	
# 1389	Man Of The Forest	Hilda Pressley	April 1970	
# 1390	Sugar In The Morning	Isobel Chace	April 1970	
# 1391	My Valiant Fledgling	Margaret Malcolm	April 1970	
# 1392	That Young Person	Sara Seale	April 1970	
# 1393	Healer Of Hearts	Katrina Britt	May 1970	
# 1394	Nurse Sandra's Second Summer	Louise Ellis	May 1970	
# 1395	Terminus Tehran	Roumelia Lane	May 1970	
# 1396	Bright Wilderness	Gwen Westwood	May 1970	
# 1397	If Love Were Wise	Elizabeth Hoy	May 1970	
# 1398	Feast Of The Candles	Iris Danbury	May 1970	
# 1399	Blue Jasmine	Violet Winspear	May 1970	
# 1400	The Distant Trap	Gloria Bevan	May 1970	
# 1401	One String For Nurse Bow	Joyce Dingwell	June 1970	
# 1402	Dear Doctor Marcus	Barbara Perkins	June 1970	
# 1403	Whisper To The Stars	Hettie Grimstead	June 1970	
# 1404	Diamonds On The Lake	Mary Cummins	June 1970	
# 1405	The Curtain Rises	Mary Burchell	June 1970	
# 1406	Walk Into The Wind	Jane Arbor	June 1970	
# 1407	Next Stop Gretna	Belinda Dell	June 1970	
# 1408	The Silver Fishes	Lucy Gillen	June 1970	
# 1409	Surgeon From Holland / Blow Hot, Blow Cold / Visiting Consultant	Betty Neels	July 1970	
# 1410	Nurse Deborah / More Than Kind	Marjorie Norrell	July 1970	
# 1411	Turn The Page	Nan Asquith	July 1970	
# 1412	Journey Of Enchantment	Gladys Fullbrook	July 1970	
# 1413	The Family Face	Bethea Creese	July 1970	
# 1414	Sown In The Wind	Jean S. MacLeod	July 1970	
# 1415	The House In The Foothills	Mons Daveson	July 1970	
# 1416	Summer In / Long White Cloud	Essie Summers	July 1970	
# 1417	Doctor In India	Patricia Cumberland	August 1970	
# 1418	A Cure With Kindness	Ruth Clemence	August 1970	
# 1419	So Enchanting An Enemy	Margaret Malcolm	August 1970	
# 1420	Precious Waif	Anne Hampson	August 1970	
# 1421	Parisian Adventure	Elizabeth Ashton	August 1970	
# 1422	The Sophisticated Urchin	Rosalie Henaghan	August 1970	
# 1423	Sullivan's Reef	Anne Weale	August 1970	
# 1424	The Vengeful Heart	Roberta Leigh	August 1970	
# 1425	Good Morning, Doctor Houston	Lucy Gillen	September 1970	
# 1426	Guardian Nurse	Joyce Dingwell	September 1970	
# 1427	To Sing Me Home	Doris E. Smith	September 1970	
# 1428	Night Of The Singing Birds	Susan Barrie	September 1970	
# 1429	The Man In Possession	Hilda Pressley	September 1970	
# 1430	Hunter's Moon	Henrietta Reid	September 1970	
# 1431	The Other Linding Girl	Mary Burchell	September 1970	
# 1432	Take The Far Dream	Jane Donnelly	September 1970	
# 1433	The Pursuit Of Dr. Lloyd	Marjorie Norrell	October 1970	
# 1434	The Cazalet Bride	Violet Winspear	October 1970	
# 1435	Scarlet Sunset	Mary Cummins	October 1970	
# 1436	The Day That the Rain Came Down	Isobel Chace	October 1970	
# 1437	To My Dear Niece	Hilda Nickson	October 1970	
# 1438	Bitter Masquerade	Margery Hilton	October 1970	
# 1439	Serenade At Santa Rosa	Iris Danbury	October 1970	
# 1440	Bleak Heritage	Jean S. MacLeod	October 1970	
# 1441	Nurse Harriet Goes to Holland / Tempestuous	Betty Neels	November 1970	
# 1442	The Autocrat of Melhurst	Anne Hampson	November 1970	
# 1443	The Feathered Shaft	Jane Arbor	November 1970	
# 1444	Fond Deceiver	Pauline Garnar	November 1970	
# 1445	The Bay Of The Nightingales	Essie Summers	November 1970	
# 1446	The Time Of The Jacaranda	Margaret Way	November 1970	
# 1447	The Turning Tide	Margaret Malcolm	November 1970	
# 1448	The Year At Yattabilla	Amanda Doyle	November 1970	
# 1449	Dedication Jones	Kate Norway	December 1970	
# 1450	Heir To Glen Ghyll	Lucy Gillen	December 1970	
# 1451	The Arrogant Duke	Anne Mather	December 1970	
# 1452	I And My Heart	Joyce Dingwell	December 1970	
# 1453	The Benevolent Despot	Elizabeth Ashton	December 1970	
# 1454	Seven Of Magpies	Doris E. Smith	December 1970	
# 1455	Girl With A Challenge	Mary Burchell	December 1970	
# 1456	This Too I'll Remember	Mons Daveson	December 1970	
