= List of Harlequin Romance novels released in 1972 =

This is a list of Harlequin Romance novels released in 1972. (Main index: List of Harlequin Romance novels)

== Releases ==
Number	Title	Author	Date	Citations
# 1553	Doctor Toby	Lucy Gillen	January 1972	
# 1554	The Keys Of The Castle	Barbara Rowan	January 1972	
# 1555	Raintree Valley	Violet Winspear	January 1972	
# 1556	No Enemy	Hilda Nickson	January 1972	
# 1557	Along The Ribbonwood Track	Mary Moore	January 1972	
# 1558	Legend Of Roscano	Iris Danbury	January 1972	
# 1559	A Singing Bird	Stella Frances Nel	January 1972	
# 1560	Windy Night, Rainy Morrow	Ivy Ferrari	January 1972	
# 1561	Home Is Goodbye	Isobel Chace	February 1972	
# 1562	Kookaburra Dawn	Amanda Doyle	February 1972	
# 1563	This Tangled Web	Margaret Malcolm	February 1972	
# 1564	South Island Stowaway	Essie Summers	February 1972	
# 1565	Harbinger Of Spring	Hilda Pressley	February 1972	
# 1566	September Street	Joyce Dingwell	February 1972	
# 1567	Do Not Go, My Love	Mary Burchell	February 1972	
# 1568	Sea Tangle	Mary Cummins	February 1972	
# 1569	Tangled Autumn	Betty Neels	March 1972	
# 1570	Heaven Is High	Anne Hampson	March 1972	
# 1571	Summer Magic	Margaret Way	March 1972	
# 1572	This Moment In Time	Lilian Peake	March 1972	
# 1573	Love Is Fire	Flora Kidd	March 1972	
# 1574	Lord Of Zaracus	Anne Mather	March 1972	
# 1575	Sister Of The Bride	Henrietta Reid	March 1972	
# 1576	It Began In Te Rangi	Gloria Bevan	March 1972	
# 1577	Dr. Maitland's Secretary	Marjorie Norrell	April 1972	
# 1578	Rata Flowers Are Red	Mary Moore	April 1972	
# 1579	Winter At Cray	Lucy Gillen	April 1972	
# 1580	Black Douglas	Violet Winspear	April 1972	
# 1581	The House Of The Amulet	Margery Hilton	April 1972	
# 1582	Wildfire Quest	Jane Arbor	April 1972	
# 1583	Sawdust Season	Kay Thorpe	April 1972	
# 1584	A Castle In Spain	Eleanor Farnes	April 1972	
# 1585	The Flowering Valley	Juliet Armstrong	May 1972	
# 1586	To Marry A Tiger	Isobel Chace	May 1972	
# 1587	Music Of The Heart	Mary Burchell	May 1972	
# 1588	The Leaping Flame	Barbara Cust	May 1972	
# 1589	Nickel Wife	Joyce Dingwell	May 1972	
# 1590	The Girl From Over The Sea	Valerie K. Nelson	May 1972	
# 1591	Operation - In Search Of Love	Hilary Wilde	May 1972	
# 1592	The Mill In The Meadow	Jane Donnelly	May 1972	
# 1593	Wish With The Candles	Betty Neels	June 1972	
# 1594	Mist Across The Moors	Lilian Peake	June 1972	
# 1595	Gold Is The Sunrise	Anne Hampson	June 1972	
# 1596	The Inn By The Lake	Dorothy Quentin	June 1972	
# 1597	The Unknown Mr. Brown	Sara Seale	June 1972	
# 1598	Star In A Dark Sky	Dorothy Slide	June 1972	
# 1599	Dear Deceiver	Doris E. Smith	June 1972	
# 1600	The Reluctant Governess	Anne Mather	June 1972	
# 1601	The Newcomer	Hilda Pressley	July 1972	
# 1602	Remedy For Love	Flora Kidd	July 1972	
# 1603	Ring Of Jade	Margaret Way	July 1972	
# 1604	That Man Next Door	Lucy Gillen	July 1972	
# 1605	Immortal Flower	Elizabeth Hoy	July 1972	
# 1606	The Quiet Veld	Jean Dunbar	July 1972	
# 1607	Not Less Than All	Margaret Malcolm	July 1972	
# 1608	Vineyard In A Valley	Gloria Bevan	July 1972	
# 1609	Not Wanted On Voyage	Kay Thorpe	August 1972	
# 1610	Dear Conquistador	Margery Hilton	August 1972	
# 1611	Chateau Of Flowers	Margaret Rome	August 1972	
# 1612	Mistress Of Elvan Hall	Mary Cummins	August 1972	
# 1613	Moment Of Decision	Jean S. MacLeod	August 1972	
# 1614	Love And Lucy Granger	Rachel Lindsay	August 1972	
# 1615	A Thousand Candles	Joyce Dingwell	August 1972	
# 1616	The Pagan Island	Violet Winspear	August 1972	
# 1617	Tree Of Promise	Juliet Shore	September 1972	
# 1618	The Wealth Of The Islands	Isobel Chace	September 1972	
# 1619	Happy With Either	Ruth Clemence	September 1972	
# 1620	Jacaranda Island	Iris Danbury	September 1972	
# 1621	Garth Of Tregillis	Henrietta Reid	September 1972	
# 1622	There Came A Tyrant	Anne Hampson	September 1972	
# 1623	Flowers For The Festival	Belinda Dell	September 1972	
# 1624	The Golden Maze	Hilary Wilde	September 1972	
# 1625	Victory For Victoria	Betty Neels	October 1972	
# 1626	A Spray Of Edelweiss	Katrina Britt	October 1972	
# 1627	My Beautiful Heathen	Lucy Gillen	October 1972	
# 1628	The Library Tree	Lilian Peake	October 1972	
# 1629	A Treasure For Life	Anne Weale	October 1972	
# 1630	Escape To Koolonga	Amanda Doyle	October 1972	
# 1631	Masquerade	Anne Mather	October 1972	
# 1632	One Man's Heart	Mary Burchell	October 1972	
# 1633	Red Ginger Blossom	Joyce Dingwell	November 1972	
# 1634	The Spell Of The Enchanter	Margery Hilton	November 1972	
# 1635	Marriage By Agreement	Margaret Malcolm	November 1972	
# 1636	Flutter Of White Wings	Elizabeth Ashton	November 1972	
# 1637	The Silver Slave	Violet Winspear	November 1972	
# 1638	Pirate Of The Sun	Gwen Westwood	November 1972	
# 1639	The Valley Of The Eagles	Eleanor Farnes	November 1972	
# 1640	If Love Be Love	Flora Kidd	November 1972	
# 1641	The Fifth Day Of Christmas	Betty Neels	December 1972	
# 1642	The Fire Of Life	Hilary Wilde	December 1972	
# 1643	The Glory Or The Love	Margaret S. McConnell	December 1972	
# 1644	Wayaway	Dorothy Cork	December 1972	
# 1645	Bride Of The Rif	Margaret Rome	December 1972	
# 1646	Isle Of The Rainbows	Anne Hampson	December 1972	
# 1647	The Sweet Spring	Hilda Nickson	December 1972	
# 1648	Moonlight And Magic	Rachel Lindsay	December 1972	
