= Arthur Nickson =

Arthur Thomas Nickson
- Born: 4 February 1902; Liverpool, England, UK
- Died: 5 January 1974 (aged 71)
- Occupation: Novelist
- Spouse: Hilda Pressley Nickson
- Writing career
- Pen name: Arthur Nickson, Matt Winstan, John Saunders, Arthur Hodson, Roy Peters
- Language: English
- Period: 1956–1968
- Genre: western fiction

Arthur Thomas Nickson (4 February 1902 in Liverpool, England – 5 January 1974), was a British western fiction writer as Arthur Nickson, Matt Winstan, John Saunders, Arthur Hodson and Roy Peters, from 1956 to 1968. He married the also English writer Hilda Nickson, née Hilda Pressley.

== Bibliography ==
=== As Arthur Nickson ===
==== Single novels ====
- Tin Star Sheriff (1956)
- Gold Trail (1957)
- No Star for the Deputy (1957)
- Silver Town (1957)
- Dust Was His Shroud (1960)
- Guns Blaze at Noon (1960)
- Bounty Hunter's Trail (1961)
- Lone Killer (1961)
- Arizona Gun Feud (1962)
- Gunfight at Nolan's Canyon (1963)
- Two Deputies Came Riding (1963)
- Arizona Hideout (1964)
- Gun Trail (1964)
- Range Tramp (1965)
- Ride a Crooked Trail (1966)
- Sandy Creek Rustlers (1967)
- Rope Law (1968)

==== Rusty Hines Series ====
- Rusty Hines Hits the Trail (1958)
- Rusty Hines – Trouble Shooter (1959)

=== As Matt Winstan ===
==== Single novels ====
- The Big Herd (1957)
- Gunslick Gambler (1958)
- New Trails Blaze West (1960)
- Gunsmoke on the Iron Trail (1961)
- Pay Off in Lead (1961)
- Bandit Trail (1962)
- Trail To Boot Hill (1962)
- Drive To Dodge City (1963)
- No Branding Fire (1963)

=== As John Saunders ===
==== Single novels ====
- One-Gun Justice (1959)
- Vengeance Rode West (1959)
- A Colt for the Kid (1959)
- Guns in High Summer (1961)
- The Next Stage Out (1961)
- Arizona Feud (1962)
- Gunman's Bluff (1963)

=== As Arthur Hodson ===
==== Single novels ====
- Silvercrop (1964)

=== As Roy Peters ===
==== Single novels ====
- The Shotgun Marshal (1964)
- Cattle Doctor (1965)
- Vigilante Justice (1966)
- Rail War (1967)
- Women Ain't Angels (1967)
- Alias Sam Smith (1968)
