= Norrey Ford =

British novelist (1907–1985)

Noreen Ford Dilcock
- Express & Star, 1949
- Born: Noreen Ford; 28 March 1907; Kingston upon Hull, England
- Died: 1985 (aged 77–78); Walsall, England
- Occupation: Novelist
- Spouse: James Louis Christian Dilcock
- Writing career
- Pen name: Norrey Ford, Jill Christian, Christian Walford
- Period: 1946-1977
- Genre: Romance

Noreen Ford Dilcock (28 March 1907, Kingston upon Hull – 1985, Walsall) was an English writer of romance novels from 1952 to 1977 under different pseudonyms: Norrey Ford, Jill Christian and Christian Walford.

She was the second elected chairman (1963–1965) of the Romantic Novelists' Association and also was a former vice-president of the organization. She was the Walsall Writers' Circle founder and life president.

== Biography ==
Noreen "Norrey" Ford born on 28 March 1907 in Kingston upon Hull to parents Robert Ford and Esther Richardson. She studied at Hull's French Convent, Ravensworth School and Appleton-le-Moors. She married James Louis Christian Dilcock (1911–2000), a Midlands judge and lay preacher at Walsall's St Paul's Church. The marriage spent much time travelling the world. Norren died on 1985 in Walsall, and her ashes were scattered over the fells by the Lake District.

== Bibliography ==
=== As Norrey Ford ===
==== Magazine article ====
- Teas provided, Housewife magazine (1946)

==== Single novels ====
- Where Love Is (1952)
- Romantic Heart (1953)
- My Gentle Enemy (1953)
- Dragon Castle (1954)
- The Mistress of High Trees (1955)
- The Rainbow in the Spray (1956)
- Nurse with a Dream (1957)
- Let Love Abide (1957)
- Wild Waters (1958)
- The House of My Enemy (1959)
- The Far Sweet Thing (1960)
- Wild Rowan (1961)
- Doctor in the Dale (1966)
- Rich Man, Poor Man (1968)
- Marriage Tree (1969)
- Someone Different (1970)
- Trouble at Gilmore's (1972)
- Call to the Castle (1974)
- One Hot Summer (1974)
- Walk Tall Country (1974)
- Life Most Dear (1974)
- Road of the Eagles (1975)
- The Love Goddess (1976)
- Fountain of Love (1977)

=== As Jill Christian ===
==== Single novels ====
- Bid Me to Love (1952)
- Heart in Waiting (1953)
- Love in the Morning (1954)
- Darling Girl (1954)
- Beyond the Frost the Flower (1955)
- Harvest of the Heart (1955)
- The Chosen One (1956)
- Summer Shadow (1958)
- This Day and For Ever (1959)
- Lad's Love (1960)
- The Tender Bond (1961)
- The Long Summer Night (1962)
- Nurse of My Heart (1963)
- The Castle of the Ravens (1967)
- Master of This House (1970)
- A Scent of Lemons (1972)

==== Anthologies in collaboration ====
- Return to Love / Stormy Haven / Nurse to Captain Andy (1972) (with Rosalind Brett and Alex Stuart)
- Tell Me My Fortune / A Scent Of Lemons / Country Of The Wine (1979) (with Mary Burchell and Mary Wibberley)

=== As Christian Walford ===
==== Single novels ====
- The Little Masters (1969)
