= Ida Pollock =

British writer (1908–2013)

- Born: Ida Julia Crowe; 12 April 1908; Lewisham, Kent, England
- Died: 3 December 2013 (aged 105); Lanreath, Cornwall, England
- Occupation: Novelist
- Spouse: Hugh Pollock (m. 1943; died 1971)
- Children: Rosemary Pollock
- Writing career
- Pen name: Ida Crowe, Joan M. Allen, Susan Barrie, Pamela Kent, Averil Ives, Anita Charles, Barbara Rowan, Jane Beaufort, Rose Burghley, Mary Whistler, Ida Pollock, Marguerite Bell
- Period: 1922–2013
- Genre: Romance
- Website: www.margeritebell.co.uk

Ida Julia Pollock (née Crowe; 12 April 1908 – 3 December 2013) was a British writer of several short-stories and over 125 romance novels that were published under her married name, Ida Pollock, and under a number of different pseudonyms: Joan M. Allen; Susan Barrie, Pamela Kent, Averil Ives, Anita Charles, Barbara Rowan, Jane Beaufort, Rose Burghley, Mary Whistler and Marguerite Bell. She sold millions of copies over her 90-year career. She has been referred to as the "world's oldest novelist", who was still active at 105 and continued writing until her death. On the occasion of her 105th birthday, Pollock was appointed honorary vice-president of the Romantic Novelists' Association, having been one of its founding members.

Ida and her husband, Lt Colonel Hugh Alexander Pollock, DSO (1888–1971), a veteran of war and Winston Churchill's collaborator and editor, had a daughter, Rosemary Pollock, who was also a romance writer. Ida's autobiography, Starlight, published in 2009 at 100 years, tells the story of the start of her career, her marriage, and the relation of her husband with his ex-wife Enid Blyton. She was also an oil painter, who was selected for inclusion in a national exhibition in 2004, at the age of 96.

== Biography ==
=== First years ===
Born Ida Julia Crowe on 12 April 1908 in Lewisham, Kent, England, she was the daughter of Fanny Osborn, whose father was an architect in Victorian London, and her husband Arthur Crowe, but Pollock claimed to be illegitimate. Still unmarried, her mother began an affair with a supposed Russian duke, but, after her parents' death, her mother married Arthur Crowe, an old widower with a distant connection to Lord Nelson. A year or so later her mother resumed her affair with her Russian lover and became pregnant, but her daughter obtained her husband's surname. Her mother lived alone when Pollock was born, and she narrowly escaped being smothered with a pillow by the nurse who attended her birth. Her mother had a difficult time raising her and she was almost adopted by a rich uncle. Encouraged by her mother, she began to write while still at school. At 14, she published her first thriller, The Hills of Raven's Haunt.

At age 20, she was living with her mother in Hastings and already had several stories in major magazines and short novels in print. She visited George Newnes's office in London, to sell her first full-length manuscript; Palanquins and Coloured Lanterns, a novel set in 1920s Shanghai. Six months later, she discovered they had mislaid it. After they found it, she returned to London to meet one of its editors, the 39-year-old Hugh Alexander Pollock (1888–1971), a distinguished veteran of World War I. Hugh had been married since 1924 to his second wife, the popular children's writer Enid Blyton, and was divorced from his first wife, Marion Atkinson, with whom he had two sons, William Cecil Alexander (1914–16) and Edward Alistair (1915–69). George Newnes bought her manuscript and contracted with her to write two more novels. She became a full-time writer in the 1930s, writing short stories under pseudonyms. Ida decided to travel alone to Morocco, after suffering a mental breakdown.

=== World War II years and family ===
During World War II, Ida worked at a hostel for girls in London during the Blitz; at this time Hugh, who had left publishing to join the Army, was Commandant of a school for Home Guard officers. Hugh had two daughters with Enid Blyton, Gillian Mary (later Baverstock; 1931–2007) and Imogen Mary (later Smallwood; born 1935), but his marriage had difficulties and his wife began a series of affairs. He offered Ida a post as civilian secretary at the Army Training Centre in the Surrey Hills. During a bungled firearms training session on a firing range, Hugh was hit by shrapnel and Ida contacted Enid, who declined to visit her husband because she was busy and hated hospitals.

In 1941, Enid met Kenneth Fraser Darrell Waters, a London surgeon with whom she began another relationship, and the marriage had broken down. In May 1942, while Ida was visiting her mother's home in Hastings a bomb destroyed the house. She escaped unhurt, but her mother was in hospital for two weeks. Hugh paid for Ida to stay at Claridges and he said he was divorcing his wife. To get a quick divorce, Hugh blamed himself for adultery at divorce petition. On 26 October 1943 Ida and Hugh were married at London's Guildhall Register Office, six days after Enid's marriage to Darrell Waters. In 1944 they had a daughter Rosemary Pollock who has also become a romance writer. Enid changed the names of their daughters and Hugh did not see them again, although Enid had promised access as part of his taking the blame for the divorce.

=== Romance writing career ===
After World War II, George Newnes, Hugh's old firm, decided not to work with him anymore. They also represented Enid Blyton and were not willing to let her go. After this the marriage experienced financial problems and, in 1950, Hugh had to declare bankruptcy while he struggled with alcoholism. Ida decided to write popular contemporary romances and sold her first novel to Mills & Boon in 1952. Being in print with several major international publishers at the same time, she decided to use multiple pseudonyms. In the 1950s she wrote as Susan Barrie, Pamela Kent, Rose Burghley, and Mary Whistler to Mills & Boon; as Averil Ives and Barbara Rowan to Ward Lock; as Anita Charles to Wright & Brown; and as Jane Beaufort to Collins. In 1964, she published under her married name, Ida Pollock, her first historical novel, The Gentle Masquerade, and after the success of it, Mills and Boon's "Masquerade" series of historical romances was launched. Under her last pseudonym, Marguerite Bell, she also wrote historical romances. Most of her novels have been reprinted by Mills & Boon (or Harlequin in the United States).

During her marriage she travelled widely and lived in many parts of England. It was their daughter's asthma that brought the Pollocks to Cornwall. They also lived in Ireland, France, Italy, Malta and Switzerland, where they successfully obtained a lasting cure for Rosemary's debilitating condition. Hugh died on 8 November 1971 in Malta, where he is buried in the British military cemetery. After her husband's death, Pollock returned with her daughter to England and they lived for several years in Wiltshire, before moving to Lanreath in 1986. In the 1970s she slowed the rhythm of publication, but continued to write. Besides romances, she published – as Barbara Rowan – a suspense novel, and her novel, A Distant Drum (2005), is based around the Battle of Waterloo. She has been referred to as the "world's oldest novelist" who was still active at 105. After her death, her medieval story: Sir Faintheart was published in 2015, and there are still at least two unpublished Regency romances pending publication, including The Runaway. Today many of her old novels are being reedited.

=== Later years ===
In addition to writing, Ida constructed model houses, usually scale miniatures of Georgian or Tudor buildings. She was also an oil painter, who was selected for inclusion in a national exhibition in 2004, at the age of 96. But her sight deteriorated and she returned to writing.

After her 100th birthday, her autobiography, Starlight, was published on 15 November 2009, and she tells the story of the start of her career, her marriage, and the relation of her husband with his ex-wife Enid Blyton.

In 1960, she was a founding member of the Romantic Novelists' Association, and in 2010 she helped in its 50th anniversary. On the occasion of her 105th birthday, she was appointed its honorary vice-president.

She died 3 December 2013, aged 105.

== Bibliography ==
=== As Ida Crowe ===
==== Single novels ====
- The Hills of Raven's Haunt, 1922

=== As Joan M. Allen ===
==== Single novels ====
- Palanquins and coloured lanterns, 1930?
- Her Chinese Captor, 1935
- Indian Love, 1935

=== As Susan Barrie ===
==== Single novels ====
- Mistress of Brown Furrows, 1952
- Gates of Dawn, 1954
- Marry a Stranger, 1954
- Carpet of dreams, 1955
- Hotel Stardust = Hotel at Treloan, 1955
- Dear Tiberius = Nurse Nolan, 1956
- So Dear to my Heart, 1956
- The House of the Laird, 1956
- Air Ticket, 1957
- Four Roads to Windrush, 1957
- Heart Specialist, 1958
- Stars of San Cecilio, 1958
- The wings of the morning, 1960
- Bride in Waiting, 1961
- Moon at the Full, 1961
- Royal Purple, 1962
- A Case of Heart Trouble, 1963
- Mountain Magic, 1964
- Castle Thunderbird, 1965
- No Just Cause, 1965
- Master of Melincourt, 1966
- Rose in the Bud, 1966
- The Quiet Heart, 1966
- Accidental Bride, 1967
- Victoria and the Nightingale, 1967
- Wild Sonata, 1968
- The Marriage Wheel, 1968/12
- Night of the Singing Birds, 1970/04

==== Omnibus collections ====
- Marry A Stranger / Rose in the Bud / Marriage Wheel, 1976
- House of the Laird / A Case of Heart Trouble / The Quiet Heart, 1976
- Return to Tremarth / Night of the Singing Birds / Bride in Waiting, 1980

==== Anthologies in collaboration ====
- Golden Harlequin Library Vol. X: The Wild Land Isobel Chance / Surgeon for Tonight / Four Roads to Windrush (1971) (with Isobel Chace by Elizabeth Houghton)
- Golden Harlequin Library Vol. XVII: No Silver Spoon / Nurse Nolan / The Time and the Place (1971) (with Jane Arbor and Essie Summers)
- Golden Harlequin Library Vol. XXI: The Doctor's Daughters / Gates of Dawn / The Gift at Snowy River (1972) (with Anne Weale and Joyce Dingwell)
- Children's Nurse / Heart Specialist / Child Friday (1972) (Sara Seale and Kathryn Blair)
- Romance Treasury (1975) (with Karin Mutch and Yvonne Whittal)
- Harlequin Classic Library (1980) (with Elizabeth Hoy, Alex Stuart, Mary Burchell, Juliet Shore, Jean S. MacLeod, Elizabeth Houghton and Jill Tahourdin)

=== As Pamela Kent ===
(* Novels reedited as Ida Pollock)

==== Single novels ====
- Moon over Africa*, 1955
- Desert Doorway, 1956
- City of Palms, 1957
- Sweet Barbary, 1957
- Meet Me in Istanbul*, 1958
- Dawn on the High Mountain, 1959
- Flight to the Stars, 1959
- The Chateau of Fire 1961
- Bladon's Rock = Doctor Gaston, 1963
- The Dawning Splendour, 1963
- Enemy Lover 1964
- Gideon Faber's Chance* = Gideon Faber's Choice, 1965
- Star Creek, 1965
- The Gardenia Tree, 1965
- Cuckoo in the Night, 1966
- White Heat, 1966
- Beloved Enemies, 1967
- The Man Who Came Back, 1967
- Desert Gold, 1968
- Man from the Sea, 1968
- Nile Dusk, 1972/12
- Night of Stars, 1975/12

==== Anthologies in collaboration ====
- Golden Harlequin Library Vol. VIII: Choose The One You'll Marry / Sweet Barbary / Senior Surgeon at St. David's (1970) (with Mary Burchell and Elizabeth Gilzean)

=== As Averil Ives ===
==== Single novels ====
- Haven of the Heart, 1956
- The Secret Heart, 1956
- Doctor's Desire = Desire for the Star, 1957
- The Uncertain Glory = Nurse Linnet's Release, 1957
- Island in the Dawn, 1958
- Love in Sunlight = Nurse for the Doctor, 1958
- Master of Hearts, 1959

==== Omnibus collections ====
- Island in the Dawn / Fox and His Vixen, 1975

=== As Anita Charles ===
==== Single novels ====
- The Black Benedicts, 1956
- My Heart at Your Feet, 1957
- One Coin in the Fountain, 1957
- Interlude for Love, 1958
- The Moon and Bride's Hill, 1958
- Autumn Wedding, 1962
- The King of the Castle, 1963
- White Rose of Love, 1963

=== As Barbara Rowan ===
==== Single novels ====
- Silver Fire = In Care of the Doctor, 1956
- Flower for a Bride, 1957
- Love is Forever, 1957
- Mountain of Dreams, 1958
- The Keys of the Castle, 1959
- House of Sand, 1986/08

==== Anthologies in collaboration ====
- Golden Harlequin Library Vol. XXXIII: Flower for a Bride / Bachelors Galore / Hope for the Doctor (1970) (with Essie Summers and Margaret Malcolm)
- Tuesday's Jillaroo / Fires of Toretta / The Keys of the Castle (1985) (with Kerry Allyne and Iris Danbury)

=== As Jane Beaufort ===
==== Single novels ====
- A Nightingale in the Sycamore, 1957
- Dangerous Lover = Dangerous Love, 1959
- Love in High Places, 1960
- A Quest for Lovers, 1963
- Interlude in Snow, 1964

=== As Rose Burghley ===
==== Single novels ====
(* Novels reedited as Susan Barrie)

- And Be Thy Love, 1958
- Love in the Afternoon, 1959
- The Sweet Surrender, 1959
- Bride by Arrangement, 1960
- A Moment in Paris, 1961
- Highland Mist, 1962
- The Garden of Don Jose*, 1965/06
- Man of Destiny, 1965/10
- A Quality of Magic, 1966
- The Afterglow = Alpine Doctor, 1966
- Bride of Alaine, 1966/10
- Folly of the Heart, 1967/04
- The Bay of Moonlight, 1968/01
- Return to Tremarth*, 1969/08

==== Anthologies in collaboration ====
- Golden Harlequin Library Vol. XXV: And be Thy Love / Doctor Memsahib / Black Charles (1962) (with Juliet Shore and Esther Wyndham)

=== As Mary Whistler ===
==== Single novels ====
- Enchanted Autumn, 1959
- Escape to Happiness, 1960
- Sunshine Yellow, 1961
- Pathway of Roses, 1962
- The Young Nightingales, 1967

=== As Ida Pollock ===
==== Single novels ====
- The Gentle Masquerade, 1964
- The Uneasy Alliance, 1965
- Lady in danger, 1967
- Summer Conspiracy 1969/02
- Country Air, 1970/08

==== Timeline Series ====
1. Sir Faintheart, 2015/04

==== Non fiction ====
- Starlight, 2009

=== As Marguerite Bell ===
(* Novels reedited as Ida Pollock)

==== Single novels ====
- A Rose for Danger*, 1977/05
- The Devil's Daughter* 1978/07
- Bride by Auction, 1989/11
- Sea Change 2002/07
- A Distant Drum, 2005/01

==== Anthologies in collaboration ====
- The Runaways / Eleanor and the Marquis / A Rose for Danger / The Secret of Val Verde (1977) (with Jane Wilby, Judith Polley and Julia Herbert)
- Eleanor and the Marquis / The Runaways / A Rose for Danger / Puritan Wife (1977) (with Jane Wilby, Judith Polley and Elizabeth De Guise)
