= Sara Seale =

British writing team

Mary Jane MacPherson and/or A.D.L. MacPherson
- Occupation: Novelist
- Spouse: yes
- Writing career
- Pen name: Sara Seale
- Period: 1932-1971
- Genre: romance

Sara Seale, was the pseudonym by Mary Jane MacPherson (d. 11 March 1974) and/or A.D.L. MacPherson (d. 30 October 1978), a British writing team of over 45 romance novels as from 1932 to 1971. Seale was one of the first Mills & Boon's authors published in Germany and the Netherlands. By the 1950s Seale was earning over £3,000/year.

== Biography ==
Mary Jane MacPherson began writing at an early age while still in her convent school. Besides being a writer, MacPherson was also a leading authority on Alsatian dogs, and was a judge at Crufts.

== Bibliography ==
=== Single novels ===
- Beggars May Sing (1932)
- Grace Before Meat (1932)
- Chase the Moon (1933)
- Summer Spell (1937)
- This Merry Bond (1938)
- Spread Your Wings (1939) a.k.a. My Heart's Desire
- Green Grass Growing (1940)
- Barn Dance (1941) a.k.a. Queen of Hearts
- Stormy Petrel (1941)
- The Silver Sty (1942)
- House of Glass (1944) a.k.a. Maggy
- Folly to Be Wise (1946)
- The Reluctant Orphan (1947) a.k.a. Orphan Bride
- The English Tutor (1948)
- The Gentle Prisoner (1949)
- These Delights (1949)
- The Young Amanda (1950)
- Then She Fled Me (1950)
- The Dark Stranger (1951)
- Wintersbride (1951)
- The Lordly One (1952)
- The Forbidden Island (1953)
- Turn to the West (1953)
- The Truant Spirit (1954)
- Time of Grace (1955)
- Child Friday (1956)
- Sister to Cinderella (1956)
- I Know My Love (1957)
- Trevallion (1957)
- Lucy Lamb (1958) a.k.a. Lucy Lamb, Doctor's Wife
- Charity Child (1959)
- Dear Dragon (1959)
- Cloud Castle (1960)
- The Only Charity (1961)
- The Reluctant Landlord (1962)
- Valentine's Day (1962)
- By Candlelight (1963)
- The Youngest Bridesmaid (1963)
- The Third Uncle (1964)
- To Catch a Unicorn (1964)
- Green Girl (1965)
- The Truant Bride (1966)
- Penny Plain (1967)
- That Young Person (1969)
- Dear Professor (1970)
- Mr. Brown (1971) a.k.a. The Unknown Mr. Brown

=== Author's omnibus collections ===
- Green Girl / Penny Plain / Queen Of Hearts (Harlequin Omnibus 9) (1975)
- Young Amanda / Truant Bride / Beggars May Sing (1983)

=== Anthologies in collaboration ===
- Do Something Dangerous / Youngest Bridesmaid / Doctor David Advises (1964) (with Elizabeth Hoy and Hilary Wilde)
- Surgeon's Marriage / The Only Charity / The Golden Peaks (1964) (with Kathryn Blair, Eleanor Farnes)
- Mountain Clinic / Forbidden Island / Dear Fugitive (1971) (with Elizabeth Hoy, Jean S. MacLeod)
- Orphan Bride / Full Tide / House in the Timberwoods (1971) (with Celine Conway, Joyce Dingwell)
- Then She Fled Me / Castle in Corsica / Scatterbrains-Student Nurse (1971) (with Margaret Malcolm and Anne Weale)
- Wintersbride / Marriage Compromise / Tamarisk Bay (1972) (with Kathryn Blair, Margaret Malcolm)
- Children's Nurse / Heart Specialist / Child Friday (1972) (Susan Barrie and Kathryn Blair)
- Harlequin Golden Library Vol. XLI: Over The Blue Mountains, Summer Lightning, Lucy Lamb, Doctor's Wife (1973) (with Mary Burchell and Jill Tahourdin)
- Masquerade / Rata Flowers Are Red / Unknown Mr. Brown (1977) (with Anne Mather, Mary Moore)
- Master of Comus / My Heart's Desire / Flight Into Yesterday (1983) (with Charlotte Lamb and Margaret Way)
