= Norma K. Hemming =

British-Australian writer (1928–1960)

Norma Kathleen Hemming
- Norma Kathleen Hemming in costume, 1956
- Born: September 1928; Ilford, Essex, London, England, United Kingdom
- Died: 4 July 1960 (aged 31); Melbourne, Australia
- Writing career
- Pen name: N. K. Hemming, Nerina Hilliard
- Language: English
- Genres: Science fiction, romance novels

Norma Kathleen Hemming (September 1928 – 4 July 1960) was a British-Australian writer of science fiction and romance novels. She was Australia's first significant female science fiction writer. As N. K. Hemming she published 20 stories in the 1950s, and also wrote and appeared in a series of plays that were performed at Australian science fiction conventions. Under the name Nerina Hilliard, she also wrote eight romance novels for Mills & Boon. She was commemorated by the Australian Science Fiction Foundation through the Norma K. Hemming Award from 2010 to 2020.

== Early life ==
Norma Kathleen Hemming was born in Ilford, Essex, in September 1928. After attending a girls' school, she trained as a secretary. In October 1948, she emigrated to Sydney on the SS Orontes, with her parents and younger brother.

== Career ==
Hemming published her first science fiction story, "Loser Takes All", in the British magazine Science Fantasy in 1951. Over the next eight years, she published a further nineteen stories, many in the Australian pulp magazine Thrills Incorporated, and others in leading British magazines such as New Worlds, Nebula SF, and Science Fiction Adventures.

She also became involved in the Sydney fan scene. She was one of the first female members of the Sydney Futurian Society, joining after the inaugural Australian science fiction convention in 1952. She was a contributor to and editor of Vertical Horizons, a fanzine specifically aimed at female science fiction fans. She wrote and performed in a series of plays performed at national fan conventions between 1954 and 1958.

By the later 1950s she had also turned to writing romance novels, under the pseudonym Nerina Hilliard. Her first romance novel, The Time is Short, was published by Mills & Boon in 1958. Another two novels appeared in 1960, and five more were published posthumously.

Her themes include mutual attraction between earth women and male aliens, children with unearthly powers, Amazons in outer space, and planets ruled by matriarchies. Her tone is often light and humorous.

== Death and legacy ==
By the late 1950s she was suffering from breast cancer, which spread to her bones and lymph nodes. She died in the Peter MacCallum Clinic in Melbourne on 4 July 1960, at the age of 31.

A collection of archival material relating to Norma Hemming, including several of her letters, is held in the Special Collections in the University of Western Australia Library.

=== Norma K. Hemming Award ===
Her achievements are commemorated by the Norma K. Hemming Award, established by the Australian Science Fiction Foundation to mark "excellence in the exploration of themes of race, gender, sexuality, class and disability" by an Australian writer. The Award was launched at the 68th World Science Fiction Convention (Aussiecon Four) in Melbourne in September 2010. It was initially awarded annually, until 2017, when it switched to biennial (with 2018's award being for works published in both 2016 and 2017), at the same time the website was relaunched. In February 2021, after the resignation of award administrator Tehani Croft, it was announced that the award would not be held in 2021. A new administrator, Geoff Allshorn, was appointed in October 2021, but no further awards have been given, and the foundation's website and social media presence closed down.

== Bibliography ==
=== As N. K. Hemming ===
- Science Fantasy: Volume 1 Number 3 (1951) (with F. G. Rayer, E. C. Tubb, J. T. McIntosh, E. R. James, John Wyndham, and John Carnell)
- New Worlds 51: Time Will Tell, Report on Earth, Conviction, Mutation, Dwellers in Silence, Creep (1956) (with Lan Wright, Kenneth Johns, and E. R. James
- New Worlds Science Fiction: Volume 17 Number 51 (1956) (with Lan Wright and Brian W. Aldiss)
- Nebula Science Fiction: Number 33: Talk Not at All, Way Out, Mute Witness, Debt of Lassor, Conflagration, Wisdom of the Gods (1958) (With Stuart Allen, Clifford C. Reed, and Robert Lloyd)
- Science Fiction Adventures: Volume 2 Number 10 (1959) (with E. C. Tubb, and Calvin M. Knox)

=== As Nerina Hilliard ===
- Time is Short (1958) (later re-issued as Nurse Carol's Secret)
- The House of Adriano (1960)
- Scars Shall Fade (1960)
- Teachers Must Learn (1968)
- Dark Star (1969)
- Dark Intruder (1975)
- Land of the Sun (1976)
- Sister to Meryl (1977)
