= Vivian Stuart =

British writer

- Yorkshire Post, 1954
- Born: Violet Vivian Finlay; 2 January 1914; Easthampstead, Berkshire, England
- Died: 18 August 1986 (aged 72); York, Yorkshire, England, United Kingdom
- Occupations: novelist, medical doctor
- Spouse(s): Esmé Austin Reeves Porch (m. 1933) Geza Santow; Mr. Stuart Cyril William Mann (m. 1957)
- Children: 5
- Writing career
- Pen name: Vivian Stuart; Alex Stuart; Barbara Allen; Fiona Finlay; V.A. Stuart; William Stuart Long; Robyn Stuart
- Period: 1953–1986
- Genres: Romance, military, historical fiction

Violet Vivian Stuart ( née Finlay; 2 January 1914 – 18 August 1986) was a British writer from 1953 to 1986. She published under different pen names: her romantic novels as Vivian Stuart, Alex Stuart, Barbara Allen, Fiona Finlay, and Robyn Stuart, her military sagas as V.A. Stuart, and her historical saga as William Stuart Long.

In 1960, she was a founder of the Romantic Novelists' Association, along with Denise Robins, Barbara Cartland, and others; she was elected the first chairman. In 1970, she became the first woman to chair Swanwick writers' summer school.

== Biography ==
=== Personal life ===
Violet Vivian Finlay was born in Berkshire, England on 2 January 1914. She was the daughter of Alice Kathleen (née Norton) and Sir Campbell Kirkman Finlay, the owner and director of Burmah Oil Company Ltd., whose Scottish family also owned James Finlay and Company Ltd. The majority of her childhood and youth was spent in Rangoon, Burma (now also known as Myanmar), where her father worked.

Finlay married four times and bore five children, Gillian Rushton (née Porch), Kim Santow, Jennifer Gooch (née Stuart), and twins Vary and Valerie Stuart.

Following the dissolution of her first marriage, she studied Law in London in the mid 1930s, before deciding to study Medicine at the University of London. Later she spent time in Hungary in the capacity of private tutor in English, while she obtained a pathologist qualification at the University of Budapest in 1938. In 1939, she emigrated to Australia with her second husband, a Hungarian Doctor Geza Santow with whom she worked. In 1942, she obtained a diploma in industrial chemistry and laboratory technique at Technical Institute of Newcastle. Having earned an ambulance driver's certificate, she joined the Australian Forces at the Women's Auxiliary Service during World War II. She was attached to the IVth Army, and raised to the rank of captain, she was posted to British XIV Army in Rangoon, Burma in October 1945, and was then transferred to Sumatra in December. After the war she returned to England.

On 24 October 1958, she married her fourth and last husband, Cyril William Mann, an investment banker.

Violet Vivian Mann died in 1986 in York, at age 72. She continued writing until her death.

=== Writing career ===
She published her first novels in 1953. She signed her romantic fiction as Vivian Stuart, one of her married names, and under the pen names of Alex Stuart, Barbara Allen, Fiona Finlay and Robyn Stuart, while for her military sagas, "Alexander Sheridan Saga" and "Phillip Hazard Saga" she used the name V.A. Stuart. William Stuart Long was her pen name for the popular historical series: "Australians", based on her research at The Mitchell Library Sydney; The National Maritime Museum; British Public Records Office and the New York Public Library.

Many of her romance novels were protagonized by doctors or nurses, and set in Asia, Australia or other places she had visited. Her novel, "Gay Cavalier" (1955 as Alex Stuart) caused trouble between Vivian and her Mills & Boon editors. She featured a secondary story line featuring a Catholic male and Protestant female who chose to marry. This so-called "mixed marriage" outraged many people in the United Kingdom at the time.

In 1960, she was a founder of the Romantic Novelists' Association, along with Denise Robins, Barbara Cartland, and others; she was elected the first chairman. In 1970, she became the first woman to chair Swanwick writers' summer school.

== Bibliography ==
Some of Stuart's novels are released under different pen names or titles.

=== As Vivian Stuart ===
==== Single novels ====
- Along Came Ann (1953) a.k.a. Along Came Doctor Ann
- Proud Heart (1953)
- The Unlit Heart (1954) a.k.a. Jungle Doctor
- Eyes of the Night (1954)
- Pilgrim Heart (1955) a.k.a. Doctor in the Tropics
- Lover Betrayed (1955)
- No Single Star (1956)
- Life Is the Destiny (1958)
- Nurse in Malaya (1960)
- The Unlit Love (1961)
- The Summer's Flower (1961)
- The New Mrs. Aldrich (1976)

==== Non fiction ====
- The Beloved Little Admiral: Admiral of the Fleet the Hon. Sir Henry Keppel 1809–1904 (1967)

==== Non fiction in collaboration ====
- His Majesty's Sloop-of-War: Diamond Rock (1978) (with George T. Eggleston)

=== Alex Stuart ===
==== Single novels ====
- The Captain's Table (1953)
- Ship's Nurse (1954)
- Soldier's Daughter (1954)
- Gay Cavalier (1955)
- Island for Sale (1955)
- Bachelor of Medicine (1956)
- A Cruise for Cinderella (1956)
- Huntsman's Folly (1956)
- Garrison Hospital (1957)
- Queen's Counsel (1957)
- The Last of the Logans (1957)
- Master of Guise (1957)
- Master of Surgery (1958) a.k.a. That Wonderful Feeling
- Daughters of the Governor (1958)
- Castle in the Mist (1959)
- Peacock Pagoda (1959)
- Return to Love (1960)
- Star of Oudh (1960) a.k.a. On Her Majesty's Orders
- Doctor Mary Courage (1961) a.k.a. Only a Memory
- Spencer's Hospital (1961)
- Sister Margarita (1961) a.k.a. Nurse in Spain
- Doctor on Horseback (1962)
- The dedicated (1962)
- Doctor of Rhua (1964) a.k.a. The Piper of Laide
- Maiden Voyage (1964)
- Samaritan's Hospital (1965)
- There But for Fortune (1966)
- Random Island (1967)
- Strangers When We Meet (1968)
- Stranger in Town (1970)
- Young Doctor Mason (1970)
- Research Fellow (1971)
- A Sunset Touch (1972)

==== Anthologies in collaboration ====
- Fair Horizon / Desert Nurse / Queen's Counsel (1970) (with Jane Arbor, Rosalind Brett)
- Nurse on Holiday / Country of the Heart / Last of the Logans (1972) (with Catherine Airlie, Rosalind Brett)
- Return to Love / Stormy Haven / Nurse to Captain Andy (1972) (with Rosalind Brett, Jill Christian)
- Send for Nurse Vincent / Island For Sale / Winter is Past (1973) (with Margaret Malcolm and Anne Weale)
- Harlequin Classic Library (1980) (with Elizabeth Hoy, Susan Barrie, Mary Burchell, Juliet Shore, Jean S. MacLeod, Elizabeth Houghton and Jill Tahourdin)

=== As Barbara Allen ===
==== Single novels ====
- Doctor Lucy (1956)
- Someone Else's Heart (1958)
- The Gay Gordons (1961)
- The Scottish Soldier (1966)

=== As Fiona Finlay ===
==== Single novels ====
- Moon Over Madrid (1957)

=== As V.A. Stuart ===
==== Alexander Sheridan Series ====
1. Like Victors and Lords (1964) a.k.a. Victors and Lords a.k.a. Captain of Cavalry
2. The Sepoy Mutiny (1973) a.k.a. Mutiny in Meerut a.k.a. Mutiny at Dawn
3. Massacre at Cawnpore (1973)
4. Cannons of Lucknow (1974) a.k.a. Battle for Lucknow
5. The Heroic Garrison (1973)

==== Phillip Hazard Series ====
1. The Valiant Sailors (1966)
2. Brave Captains (1968) a.k.a. The Brave Captains
3. Black Sea Frigate (1971) a.k.a. Hazard's Command
4. Hazard of Huntress (1972)
5. Hazard in Circassia (1973)
6. Victory at Sebastopol (1973) a.k.a. Hazard to the Rescue
7. Guns to the Far East (1975) a.k.a. Shannon's Brigade
8. Escape from Hell (1976) a.k.a. Sailors on Horseback

=== As William Stuart Long ===
==== Australians Series ====
1. The Exiles (1979)
2. The Settlers (1980)
3. The Traitors (1981)
4. The Explorers (1982)
5. The Adventurers (1983)
6. The Colonists (1984)
7. The Gold Seekers (1985)
8. The Patriots (1986) a.k.a. The Gallant
9. The Empire Builders (1987)
10. The Seafarers (1988)
11. The Nationalists (1989)
12. The Imperialists (1990)

=== As Robyn Stuart ===
==== Single novels ====
- Buccaneer's Lady (1981)
- Wild Rivers Run (1983)
- From the Flames (1983)
