= Mary Burchell =

British novelist, campaigner for Jewish refugees (1904–1986)

Ida Cook
- Born: 24 August 1904; Sunderland, England
- Died: 22 December 1986 (aged 82)
- Occupation: Novelist
- Relatives: Louise Cook (sister)
- Writing career
- Pen name: Mary Burchell
- Period: 1936–1985
- Genre: Romance
- Notable work: The Warrender Saga

We Followed Our Stars by Ida Cook, known to millions as Mary Burchell, 1950

Ida Cook (24 August 1904 – 22 December 1986) was a British campaigner for Jewish refugees and, as Mary Burchell, a romance novelist.

Ida Cook and her sister Louise Cook (1901–1991) rescued Jews from the Nazis during the 1930s. The sisters helped 29 people escape, funded mainly by Ida's writing. In 1965, the Cook sisters were honoured as Righteous among the Nations by Yad Vashem in Israel. In 2010 she was recognised as a British Hero of the Holocaust with her sister.

Between 1936 and 1985, under the pen name Mary Burchell, Ida Cook wrote 112 romance novels for Mills & Boon — many of which were later republished by Harlequin. She helped to found the Romantic Novelists' Association, serving as its second president from 1966 to 1986.

== Biography ==
=== Personal life ===
Ida Cook was born on 24 August 1904 in Sunderland, County Durham, England. With her elder sister Louise Cook (1901–1991), she attended The Duchess's School in Alnwick and later took civil service jobs in London. Both sisters developed a passionate interest in opera.

During the 1930s, as part of the work they undertook to help Jews to escape from the Nazi regime, the sisters visited Germany on multiple occasions, using their enthusiasm for opera as a cover for their frequent travel, and smuggled Jewish people's jewellery and other valuables across the German border, thereby enabling Jews fleeing Germany to satisfy British financial security requirements for immigration. They worked with Austrian conductor Clemens Krauss and his wife, the Romanian soprano Viorica Ursuleac, who had initially told them of the persecution of the Jews. The sisters enabled the escape of 29 Jews and others needing to flee from Nazi Germany, funded mainly by Ida's writing. The Cooks gave them an address to come to, a flat in Dolphin Square in Pimlico. Among those recued were Else Mayer-Lismann and her family.

In 1965 the Cook sisters were honoured as Righteous among the Nations by the Yad Vashem Martyrs and Heroes Remembrance Authority in Israel. In 2010 the British Government named each of them a British Hero of the Holocaust.

=== Writing career ===
In 1936 Ida published her first romance novels as Mary Burchell. During her career she wrote 112 romances for Mills & Boon, later re-edited by Harlequin Books, including the famous Warrender Saga, a series about the opera and concert-hall world. She incorporated many famous operas (Otello, Eugene Onegin and Carmen, among others) into the Warrender series plots. She wrote in the Romantic Novelists' Association's newsletter:

I concede that a bad romantic novel is embarrassing and indefensible. So is a bad so-called realistic novel. And it is usually pretentious into the bargain, which is insufferable. But a good romantic novel is a heart-warming thing, which strikes a responsive chord in those who are happy and offers a certain lifting of the spirits to those who are not.

In 1950 she published her autobiography, We Followed Our Stars. In 2008 it was re-issued, re-edited and expanded as Safe Passage.

Cook was the subject of This Is Your Life in 1956 (its first series) when she was surprised by Eamonn Andrews at the BBC Television Theatre. She ghost-wrote Tito Gobbi's autobiography, My Life (1979).

== Legacy ==
In January 2017, Sunderland Council erected a blue plaque commemorating the sisters on the site of their childhood home at 37 Croft Avenue, Sunderland. The same year, producer Donald Rosenfeld discussed plans to make a film of the sisters' humanitarian work and his efforts to unseal CIA files on their activities. The film was to be based on the research by investigative journalist Isabel Vincent.

In 2022, Isabel Vincent published Overture of Hope about the Cook Sisters.

An episode of the documentary series Mysteries at the Museum features the sisters' activities in rescuing Jews from Nazi Germany.

In 2024, the Cook sisters and their work rescuing German Jews were the focus of an episode of History's Secret Heroes on BBC Radio 4.

== Bibliography ==
Burchell's works include:

=== As Mary Burchell ===
==== Single novels ====
- Wife to Christopher, 1936
- Except my Love, 1937
- Nobody Asked Me, 1937
- But Not For Me, 1938
- Other Lips Have Loved You (later republished as Two Loves Have I), 1938
- With All My Worldly Goods, 1938
- Yet Love Remains, 1938
- After Office Hours, 1939
- Little Sister, 1939
- One of the Family, 1939
- Such is Love, 1939
- I'll Go With You, 1940
- Pay Me Tomorrow, 1940
- Yours With Love, 1940
- Accompanied by His Wife, 1941
- Always Yours, 1941
- Just a Nice Girl, 1941
- Strangers May Marry, 1941
- Love Made the Choice, 1942
- Thine Is My Heart, 1942
- Where Shall I Wander? (later republished as Bargain Wife), 1942
- Dare I Be Happy?, 1943
- My Old Love Came, 1943
- Dearly Beloved, 1944
- Take Me with You, 1944
- Thanks to Elizabeth, 1944
- Away Went Love, 1945
- Meant for Each Other, 1945
- Find Out the Way, 1946
- First Love-Last Love, 1946
- Wife by Arrangement, 1946
- Not Without You, 1947
- Under Joint Management, 1947
- Ward of Lucifer, 1947
- If You Care, 1948
- The Brave in Heart, 1948
- Then Come Kiss Me, 1948
- Choose Which You Will, 1949
- I Will Love You Still, 1949
- If This Were All, 1949
- Wish on the Moon, 1949
- A Letter for Don, 1950
- At First Sight, 1950
- Love Him or Leave Him, 1950
- Here I Belong, 1951
- Mine for a Day, 1951
- Tell Me My Fortune, 1951
- Over the Blue Mountains, 1952
- Stolen Heart, 1952
- Sweet Adventure, 1952
- A Ring on Her Finger, 1953
- No Real Relation, 1953
- The Heart Cannot Forget, 1953
- The Heart Must Choose, 1953
- Meet Me Again (later republished as Nurse Allison's Trust), 1954
- Under the Stars of Paris, 1954
- When Love's Beginning, 1954
- The Prettiest Girl, 1955
- Yours to Command, 1955
- For Ever and Ever, 1956
- Loving is Giving, 1956
- On the Air, 1956
- To Journey Together, 1956
- And Falsely Pledge My Love, 1957
- It's Rumoured in the Village, 1957
- Joanna at the Grange, 1957
- Love is my Reason, 1957
- Loyal in All (later republished as Nurse Marika, Loyal in All), 1957
- Dear Sir, 1958
- Dear Trustee, 1958
- Hospital Corridors, 1958
- The Girl in the Blue Dress, 1958
- Honey, 1959
- Star Quality (later republished as Surgeon of Distinction), 1959
- Across the Counter, 1960
- Choose the One You'll Marry, 1960
- Corner House, 1960
- Paris—and My Love, 1960
- My Sister Celia, 1961
- Reluctant Relation, 1961
- The Wedding Dress, 1961
- House of Conflict, 1962
- Inherit My Heart, 1962
- Dangerous Loving, 1963
- Sweet Meadows, 1963
- Do Not Go, My Love, 1964/01
- The Strange Quest of Anne Weston (later republished as The Strange Quest of Nurse Anne), 1964
- Girl With a Challenge, 1965
- Her Sister's Children, 1965
- The Other Linding Girl, 1966
- Cinderella After Midnight, 1967
- The Marshall Family, 1967
- Though Worlds Apart, 1967
- Missing from Home, 1968
- A Home for Joy, 1969
- The Rosewood Box, 1970
- Call and I'll Come, 1970
- Second Marriage, 1971
- One Man's Heart, 1971

==== The Warrender Saga ====
1. A Song Begins, 1965 (Otello)
2. The Broken Wing (later republished as Damaged Angel), 1966 (excerpts Così fan tutte, Semiramide, Norma)
3. When Love is Blind, 1967 (Beethoven's 3rd Concerto)
4. The Curtain Rises, 1969 (The Magic Flute)
5. Child of Music, 1971
6. Music of the Heart, 1972
7. Unbidden Melody, 1973 (Eugene Onegin)
8. Song Cycle, 1974
9. Remembered Serenade, 1975 (L'amore dei tre re)
10. Elusive Harmony, 1976 (Carmen, Otello, André Chénier)
11. Nightingales, 1980 (Mendelssohn's Elijah)
12. Masquerade with Music, 1982 (I Pagliacci)
13. On Wings of Song, 1985 (Alceste, Suor Angelica)

==== Omnibus collections ====
- 3 Great Novels: Take Me With You; Choose Which You Will; Meant for Each Other (1975)
- 3 Great Novels: The Heart Cannot Forget; Ward of Lucifer; A Home for Joy
- 3 Great Novels: The Other Linding Girl; Girl with a Challenge; My Sister Celia
- It's Rumored in the Village / Except My Love / Strangers May Marry (1983)

==== Anthologies in collaboration ====
- Golden Harlequin Library Vol. VIII: Choose The One You'll Marry / Sweet Barbary / Senior Surgeon at St. David's (1970) (with Pamela Kent and Elizabeth Gilzean)
- Golden Harlequin Library XLI: Over The Blue Mountains; Summer Lightning; Lucy Lamb; Doctor's Wife (1973) (with Sara Seale and Jill Tahourdin)
- Tell Me My Fortune / A Scent Of Lemons / Country Of The Wine (1979) (with Jill Christian and Mary Wibberley)
- Harlequin Classic Library (1980) (with Elizabeth Hoy, Alex Stuart, Susan Barrie, Juliet Shore, Jean S. MacLeod, Elizabeth Houghton and Jill Tahourdin)
- Just a Nice Girl / Pride of Madeira / Valley of Paradise (1983) (with Elizabeth Hunter and Margaret Rome)
- The Hills of Maketu / Under the Stars of Paris / Every Wise Man (1986) (with Gloria Bevan and Jacqueline Gilbert)

=== As Ida Cook ===
==== Non-fiction ====
- We Followed Our Stars (1950), re-released as Safe Passage (2008) and later The Bravest Voices (2021) (autobiography)
