= Essie Summers =

New Zealand writer

Ethel Snelson Summers Flett
- Born: Ethel Snelson Summers; 24 July 1912; Christchurch, New Zealand
- Died: 27 August 1998 (aged 86); Taradale, New Zealand
- Citizenship: New Zealand
- Occupation: novelist
- Spouse: William Flett
- Writing career
- Pen name: Essie Summers
- Period: 1956–1997

Essie Summers (born Ethel Snelson Summers, 24 July 1912 – 27 August 1998) was a New Zealand writer whose romance novels sold more than 19 million copies in 105 countries. She was known as New Zealand's "Queen of Romance."

== Writing ==
Despite the responsibilities of being a minister's wife and the mother of two children, Summers found time to pen short stories, poetry, and newspaper columns before embarking on her first novel, which sold to the publishing firm of Mills & Boon in 1956. Entitled New Zealand Inheritance, it was published in 1957.

"All her romances depict strong-charactered heroines who work for a living. Because most of them marry heroes with farms to run, these women continue to work after marriage and children, and there are many positive portraits of other farming women in the novels." This aspect of her writing suited Mills & Boon's general ethos at the time of her writing, when partnerships between husbands and wives was "a constant theme, ... often used to circumvent a particular period's ideology that married women should not work after marriage."

Although not generally referred to as a feminist, Summers positions all her heroines "as brave, caring, intelligent and loved for [their] uniqueness." None of her heroes are violent.

Summers was the first of many exceptionally successful New Zealand women writers of women's romance novels, e.g., Daphne de Jong and Robyn Donald. Her influence as a role model can only be assumed, but Jay Dixon suggests in her history of Mills & Boon that some of her plot devices may have been picked up by later New Zealand authors. For example, she links Summers and Susan Napier in a discussion of the practice of using characters from earlier books "in later books, as onlookers to another couple's love affair," something that Summers did "frequently."

== Biography ==
Summers was born on 24 July 1912 to a newly emigrated couple, Ethel Snelson and Edwin Summers, who lived in Bordesley Street in Christchurch. Summers was always proud of both her British heritage and her New Zealand citizenship. Both her parents were exceptional storytellers, and this, combined with her early introduction to the Anne of Green Gables stories, engendered in her a lifelong fascination with the craft of writing and the colourful legacy of pioneers everywhere.

Leaving school at 14 when her father's butcher shop experienced financial difficulties, she worked for a number of years in draper's shops instead of following her dream to be a teacher. Her first published work was a poem, titled Gypsy Heart. It appeared in 1931 in the Australian Woman's Mirror when she was only eighteen. She received eight and sixpence for the poem, and by this stage had been writing poems and short stories for a decade. Continuing to submit poems, articles and short stories to magazines and newspapers, honing her skills, and even becoming a weekly columnist for the Timaru Herald, under the pen-name "Tamsin" for six years, her husband encouraged her to turn her experiences to good use in writing the romantic novels for which she became famous.

She met her husband-to-be, William Flett, when she was 13 years old; it took another 13 years before she consented to marry him and become a minister's wife. William was a Baptist minister who then retrained to become Presbyterian. He served in parishes throughout New Zealand. They had two children, William and Elizabeth.

Summers died in Taradale, Hawkes Bay on 27 August 1998.

Essie Summers' book covers were featured as part of a heritage romance cover display at the Auckland Central Library in 2013.

A Ryman Healthcare retirement village in Christchurch was renamed from Beckenham Courts to Essie Summers Retirement Village in honour of her.

== Bibliography ==
=== Single novels ===
- 1957 New Zealand Inheritance (Heatherleigh)
- 1958 Bachelors Galore
- 1958 The Time and the Place
- 1959 Master of Tawhai
- 1959 The Lark in the Meadow (Nurse Abroad)
- 1960 Moon Over the Alps
- 1961 Come Blossom Time My Love
- 1962 No Roses in June
- 1962 The House of the Shining Tide
- 1963 Where No Roads Go
- 1963 South to Forget (Nurse Mary's Engagement)
- 1964 The Smoke and the Fire
- 1964 Bride in Flight
- 1965 No Legacy for Lindsay
- 1965 No Orchids By Request
- 1965 Sweet are the Ways
- 1966 Heir to Windrush Hill
- 1966 His Serene Miss Smith
- 1966 Postscript to Yesterday
- 1967 A Place Called Paradise
- 1968 Rosalind Comes Home
- 1968 Meet on My Ground
- 1969 Revolt – and Virginia
- 1969 The Kindled Fire
- 1970 Summer in December
- 1970 The Bay of the Nightingales
- 1971 Return to Dragonshill
- 1971 The House on Gregor's Brae
- 1972 South Island Stowaway
- 1973 A Touch of Magic
- 1973 The Forbidden Valley
- 1974 Through all the years
- 1974 The Gold of Noon
- 1975 Anna of Strathallan
- 1976 Not by Appointment
- 1976 Beyond the Foothills
- 1977 Goblin Hill
- 1977 Adair of Starlight Peaks
- 1978 Spring in September
- 1978 The Lake of the Kingfisher
- 1979 My Lady of the Fuchsias
- 1979 One More River to Cross
- 1980 The Tender Leaves
- 1981 Autumn in April
- 1981 Daughter of the Misty Gorges
- 1982 A Lamp for Jonathan
- 1983 A Mountain for Luenda
- 1983 Season of Forgetfulness
- 1984 MacBride of Tordarroch
- 1985 Winter in July
- 1986 To Bring you Joy
- 1987 High Country Governess
- 1995 South Horizon Man
- 1995 So Comes Tomorrow
- 1996 Caleb's Kingdom
- 1997 Design for Life

==== Non-fiction ====
- 1974 The Essie Summers Story

==== Omnibus ====
- Bride in Flight / Postscript to Yesterday / Meet on My Ground (1974)
- The Master of Tawhai / His Serene Miss Smith / A Place Called Paradise (1975)
- Summer in December / Bay of the Nightingales / Return to Dragonshill (1976)
- No Legacy for Lindsay/ No Orchids By Request / Sweet Are the Ways (1976)
- Heir to Windrush Hill / Rosalind Comes Home / Revolt – And Virginia (1976)
- The House on Gregor's Brae / South Island Stowaway / A Touch of Magic (1976)
- The Forbidden Valley / Through All the Years / The Gold of Noon (1979)

==== Anthologies in collaboration ====
- Golden Harlequin Library Vol. XXXIII: Flower for a Bride / Bachelors Galore / Hope for the Doctor (1970) (with Barbara Rowan and Margaret Malcolm)
- Golden Harlequin Library Vol. XVII: No Silver Spoon / Nurse Nolan / The Time and the Place (1971) (with Jane Arbor and Susan Barrie)
- Other Miss Donne / Thistle and the Rose / Beyond the Foothills (1985) (with Jane Arbor and Margaret Rome)
- The Little Dragon / Adair of Starlight Peaks / The Dark Warrior (1987) (with Betty Neels and Mary Wibberley)
