= Jane Arbor =

British writer

- Born: Eileen Norah Murphy; 8 September 1903; Yeovil, Somerset, England
- Died: 4 February 1994 (aged 90); Worthing, West Sussex, England
- Occupation: writer
- Writing career
- Pen name: Jane Arbor
- Period: 1948–1985
- Genre: Romance

Eileen Norah Owbridge (née Murphy; 8 September 1903 – 4 February 1994) was a British writer who under the pseudonym Jane Arbor wrote 57 romances for Mills & Boon from 1948 to 1985.

She wrote doctor-nurse and foreign romances. Many of her doctor-nurse romances have been re-edited with different titles, that included medical words. She lived in Preston, Sussex, England.

== Bibliography ==
=== As Jane Arbor ===
==== Single novels ====
- This Second Spring, (1948)
- Each Song Twice Over, (1948)
- Ladder of Understanding, (1949)
- Strange Loyalties = Doctor's Love, (1949)
- By Yet Another Door = Nurse in Waiting, (1950)
- No Lease for Love = My Surgeon Neighbor, (1950)
- The Heart Expects Adventure, (1951)
- Memory Serves My Love, (1952)
- The Eternal Circle = Nurse Atholl Returns, (1952)
- Flower of the Nettle = Consulting Surgeon, (1953)
- Such Frail Armour = Nurse in Love, (1953)
- Folly of the Heart = Nurse Harlowe, (1954)
- Jess Mawney, Queen's Nurse = Queen's Nurse, (1954)
- Dear Intruder, (1955)
- City Nurse = Nurse Greve, (1956)
- Towards the Dawn, (1956)
- Yesterday's Magic, (1957)
- Far Sanctuary, (1958)
- No Silver Spoon, (1959)
- Sandflower, (1959)
- A Girl Named Smith, (1960)
- Nurse of All Work, (1962)
- Desert Nurse, (1963)
- Jasmine Harvest, (1963)
- Lake of Shadows, (1964)
- Kingfisher Tide, (1965)
- High Master of Clere, (1966)
- Summer Every Day, (1966)
- Golden Apple Island, (1967)
- Stranger's Trespass, (1968)
- The Cypress Garden, 1969/May)
- Walk into the Wind, (1970/Jan)
- The Feathered Shaft, (1970/May)
- The Linden Leaf, (1971)
- The Other Miss Donne, (1971/Aug)
- Wildfire Quest, (1972/Jan)
- The Flower on the Rock, (1972/Nov)
- Roman Summer, (1973/Jul)
- The Velvet Spur, (1974/Mar)
- Meet the Sun Halfway, (1974/Aug)
- The Wide Fields of Home, (1975/Mar)
- Smoke into Flame, (1975/Nov)
- Tree of Paradise, (1976/Aug)
- Two Pins in a Fountain, (1977/Jan)
- A Growing Moon, (1977/Jun)
- Flash of Emerald, (1977/Dec)
- Return to Silbersee, (1978/Aug)
- Late Rapture, (1978/Dec)
- Pact Without Desire, (1979/Jun)
- The Devil Drives, (1979/Dec)
- Where The Wolf Leads, (1980/Jul)
- One Brief Sweet Hour, (1980/Dec)
- Invisible Wife, (1981/Jun)
- The Price of Paradise, (1982/Mar)
- Handmaid to Midas, (1982/Oct)
- House of Discord, (1983/Nov)
- Lost Yesterday, (1985/Jul)

==== Omnibus collections ====
- Feathered Shaft / Wildfire Quest / Flower on the Rock (1982)

==== Anthologies in collaboration ====
- Fair Horizon / Desert Nurse / Queen's Counsel (1970) (with Rosalind Brett and Alex Stuart)
- Golden Harlequin Library Vol. XVII: No Silver Spoon / Nurse Nolan / The Time and the Place (1971) (with Susan Barrie and Essie Summers)
- Light in the Tower / Along The Ribbonwood Track / The Linden Leaf (1975) (with Jean S. MacLeod and Mary Moore)
- Roman Summer / Flamboyant Tree / Black Niall (1977) (with Isobel Chace and Mary Wibberley)
- Velvet Spur / The Habit of Love / Extraordinary Engagement (1979) (with Joyce Dingwell and Marjorie Lewty)
- Other Miss Donne / Thistle and the Rose / Beyond the Foothills (1985) (with Margaret Rome and Essie Summers)
- One Brief Sweet Hour / Once More With Feeling / Blue Lotus (1990) (with Natalie Sparks and Margaret Way)
