= Hilda Nickson =

British novelist

Hilda Pressley Nickson
- Born: Hilda Pressley; 18 November 1912; Maltby, England, United Kingdom
- Died: 1977 (aged 64–65)
- Occupation: Novelist
- Spouse: Arthur Nickson
- Writing career
- Pen name: Hilda Nickson, Hilda Pressley, Hilary Preston
- Language: English
- Period: 1957–1977
- Genre: Romance

Hilda Nickson, née Pressley (18 November 1912 – 1977), was a British writer of over 60 romance novels published from 1957 to 1977 under her married and maiden name. She was vice-president of the Romantic Novelists' Association. She was married to the writer Arthur Nickson (1902–1974).

== Biography ==
Hilda Pressley was born on 18 November 1912 in Maltby, England, UK. She married the Western fiction novelist Arthur (Thomas) Nickson (a.k.a. Arthur Hodson, Roy Peters, John Saunders, and Matt Winstan).

She published her first novels as Hilda Nickson at Herbert Jenkins in the 1950s, before being taken on at Mills & Boon under her married name and as Hilda Pressley. Most of her novels were republished under the Harlequin imprint, sometimes with different titles. Her first novels were popular doctor-nurse romances; love triangles frequently feature in her plots, and she also set her novels in Italy or Spain.

Hilda Pressley Nickson died in 1977.

== Bibliography ==
=== As Hilda Nickson ===
==== Single novels ====
- Love is the Anchor (1957) a.k.a. A Kiss for Elaine
- The Tender Heart (1957)
- Her Foolish Heart (1958) a.k.a. Nurse Foster's Foolish Heart
- The Gentle Wind (1958)
- He Whom I Love (1959) a.k.a. Doctor Phillip
- With You Beside Me (1959)
- Love the Physician (1960)
- Staff Nurse at St. Christopher's (1961)
- Quayside Hospital (1962)
- Sister of Nightingale (1963)
- Tender Nurse (1963)
- For Love of a Surgeon (1964)
- Forest Hospital (1964)
- The World of Nurse Mitchell (1964)
- Wind over the Broads (1964)
- Sister at Butlin's (1965)
- Take My Hand (1965)
- Season of Mists (1966) a.k.a. Nurse Adele
- Sisters in Love (1966)
- Surgeon at Witteringham (1966)
- A Friend of the Family (1967)
- Until you came (1967)
- Gather Then the Rose (1968)
- Fair Blows the Wind (1969)
- Moonlight on the Water (1969)
- This Desirable Residence (1969)
- To My Dear Niece (1970)
- On a May Morning (1970)
- No Enemy (1971)
- The Sweet Spring (1972)
- Surgeon's Return (1973)
- Lord of the Forest (1973)
- To Have and to Hold (1974)
- Story of Love (1974)
- Island in the Sun (1975)
- To Care Again (1977)
- Now with His Love (1977)
- Voyage of Discovery (1987)
- So Tempting an Offer (1988)

==== Series ====
1. Junior Theatre Sister (1962) a.k.a. Operation Love
2. Surgeons in Love (1962) a.k.a. Something Personal

==== Anthologies in collaboration ====
- It Began in Te Rangi / The Gentle Flame / To My Dear Niece (1976) (with Gloria Bevan and Katrina Britt)

=== As Hilda Pressley ===
==== Single novels ====
- Theatre Sister (1960) a.k.a. Theatre Nurse
- Night Nurse Lucy (1960) a.k.a. Night Nurse
- Love, the Surgeon (1961)
- Staff Nurse on Gynae (1961)
- Staff Nurses in Love (1962)
- Night Admission (1962)
- Night Sister in Charge (1963) a.k.a. Night Superintendent
- The Gentle Surgeon (1963)
- Journey to Love (1964)
- Nurse's Dilemma (1965)
- Where Lies the Fault (1965)
- Senior Staff Nurse (1966)
- The Newcomer (1966)
- Venetian Love Song (1966)
- A Love of Her Own (1967)
- Man of the Forest (1968)
- Suddenly, It Was Spring (1968)
- Man in Possession (1969)
- More Than Gold (1969)
- To the Highest Bidder (1970)
- Summer to Remember (1971)
- Harbinger of Spring (1971)
- When Winter Has Gone (1971)

==== Anthologies in collaboration ====
- Deep in the Forest / Lord of the Forest / When Winter Has Gone (1981) (with Joyce Dingwell and Rachel Ford)

=== As Hilary Preston ===
==== Single novels ====
- Night Sister in Love (1959)
- Nurse Jane and Doctor John (1961) a.k.a. A Life to Share (1962)
- Nurse Angela (1961)
- Man of the Trees (1978)
