= Anne Weale =

British writer (1929–2007)

Jay Blakeney
- Born: 20 June 1929; England
- Died: 24 October 2007 (aged 78)
- Occupation: Novelist
- Writing career
- Pen name: Anne Weale, Andrea Blake
- Period: 1955–2002
- Genre: Romantic novel

Jay Blakeney (20 June 1929 – 24 October 2007) was a British writer and newspaper reporter, well known as a romance novelist under the pen names Anne Weale and Andrea Blake. She wrote over 88 books for Mills & Boon from 1955 to 2002. She died on 24 October 2007; at the time of her death she was writing her autobiography, 88 Heroes…1 Mr Right.

== Biography ==
Anne Weale was a journalist and writer who lived mainly in Europe. She was best known for her romance novels of the 1980s. She published her first romance novel as Anne Weale in 1955 and her last novel in 2002.

Weale attended Norwich High School for Girls. She began her writing career while she was still at school, selling short stories to a women's magazine. Later, she worked as a journalist to further her career and hone her writing. She worked as reporter for three different British papers until she decided to focus more exclusively on her novels.

Weale was a passionate traveller, which is reflected in her stories featuring many different exotic locations as the setting. When not travelling, Weale and her husband, who had a son who leads adventure expeditions, spent winters in Spain and summers on the island of Guernsey.

Weale published numerous books, including numerous romance novels which have appeared in various series through the 1980s and 90s. Anne considered her longer novels her greatest works. These books were written in the 1980s and are now out of print. Nevertheless, readers all over the world continue to find her books in second-hand bookshops and libraries. The majority of these titles focus on a fictional English country manor, Longwarden, and its inhabitants throughout time.

From 1998 to 2004, Anne wrote a website review column, called Bookworm on the Net, for The Bookseller, the UK's leading weekly book trade magazine read by 80,000 people in 96 countries. In May 2005 she began a book-blog of the same name, and at the time of her death she was working on an autobiography called 88 Heroes...1 Mr. Right.

== Bibliography ==
Weale's books have been translated into Spanish, Dutch, Finnish, Danish, Greek, Italian, Arabic, German, French, Polish and Afrikaans.

=== As Anne Weale ===
==== Single novels ====
- Winter is Past (1955)
- The Lonely Shore (1956)
- The House of Seven Fountains (1957)
- Never to love (1958)
- Sweet to Remember (1958)
- Castle in Corsica (1959)
- Hope for Tomorrow (1959)
- A Call for Nurse Templar = Nurse Templar (1960)
- Until We Met (1961)
- The Doctor's Daughters (1962)
- The House on Flamingo Cay (1962)
- If This is Love (1963)
- The Silver Dolphin (1963)
- All I Ask (1964)
- Islands of Summer (1964)
- Three Weeks in Eden = Doctor in Malaya (1964)
- Girl About Town = Christina Comes To Town (1965)
- The Feast of Sara (1965)
- Terrace in the Sun (1966)
- The Sea Waif (1967)
- South from Sounion (1968)
- The Man in Command (1968)
- Sullivan's Reef (1970)
- Summer Lightning = That Man Simon (1971)
- A Treasure for Life (1972)
- The Fields of Heaven (1973)
- Lord of the Sierras (1974)
- The Sun in Splendour (1975)
- Bid Time Return (1977)
- Stowaway (1978)
- Now or Never (1978)
- The River Room (1978)
- Separate Bedrooms (1979)
- The Girl from the Sea (1979)
- The First Officer (1980)
- A Touch of the Devil (1980)
- The Last Night at Paradise (1980)
- Bed of Roses (1981)
- Rain of Diamonds (1981)
- Blue Days at Sea (1981)
- Passage to Paxos (1981)
- Antigua Kiss (1982)
- Wedding of the year (1982)
- All That Heaven Allows (1983)
- Yesterday's Island (1983)
- Ecstasy (1983)
- Summer's Awakening (1984)
- Frangipani (1985)
- Night Train (1987)
- Lost Lagoon (1987)
- Neptune's Daughter (1987)
- Catalan Christmas (1988)
- Do You Remember Babylon? (1989)
- Sea Fever (1990)
- Pink Champagne (1991)
- The Singing Tree (1992)
- Footprints in the Sand (1992)
- The Fabergé Cat (1993)
- Turkish Delights (1993)
- Seascape (1995)
- Never Go Back (1995)
- A Night to Remember (1996)
- Sophie's Secret (1996)
- A Marriage Has Been Arranged (1997)
- The Youngest Sister (1997)
- The Impatient Virgin (1998)
- The Bartered Bride (1998)
- Sleepless Nights (1999)
- Desert Honeymoon (1999)
- Worthy of Marriage (2000)
- Sea Change (2002)

==== Castle series ====
1. Portrait of Bethany (1982)
2. Girl in a Golden Bed (1986)

==== Longwarden Saga ====
1. Flora (1983)
2. All My Worldly Goods (1987)
3. Time and Chance (1989) (AKA The Fountain of Delight)

==== Valdecarrasca series ====
1. A Spanish Honeymoon (2002)
2. The Man from Madrid (2002)

==== First Class series (multi-author) ====
- Thai Silk (1990)

==== Man of the World series (multi-author) ====
- Tequila Sunrise (1994)

==== Omnibus collections ====
- 3 Great Novels: Doctor in Malaya / The Feast of Sara / The Sea Waif (1976)
- The Best of Anne Weale: The First Officer / The Stowaway (1984)

==== Anthologies in collaboration ====
- Golden Harlequin Library Vol. XXI: The Doctor's Daughters / Gates of Dawn / The Gift at Snowy River (1972) (with Susan Barrie and Joyce Dingwell)
- Send for Nurse Vincent / Island For Sale / Winter is Past (1973) (with Margaret Malcolm and Alex Stuart)
- Day That the Rain Came Down / Turning Tide / Sullivan's Reef (1974) (with Isobel Chace and Margaret Malcolm)
- Stranger in the Glen / The Man at Kambala / Lord of the Sierras (1978) (with Flora Kidd and Kay Thorpe)
- Boardroom Affairs (2000) (with Day Leclaire and Leigh Michaels)
- Marriages by Arrangement (2000) (with Diana Hamilton and Cathy Williams)
- Taming the Playboy (2001) (with Catherine George and Susan Napier)

=== As Andrea Blake ===
==== Single novels ====
- September in Paris (1961)
- Whisper of Doubt (1962)
- Now and Always (1964)
- The Night of the Hurricane (1965)
