= Elizabeth Hoy =

Alice Nina Conarain Hoysradt
- Born: Alice Nina Conarain; 2 February 1898; Dublin, Ireland
- Died: 7 November 1982 (age 84); Maidenhead, Berkshire, England
- Citizenship: British
- Occupation: novelist
- Spouse: Mr. Hoysradt
- Partner: Edward Bowyer
- Writing career
- Pen name: Elizabeth Hoy, Nina Conarain
- Language: English
- Period: 1933–1980
- Genre: Romance

Alice Nina Hoysradt, née Conarain (2 February 1898 — 7 November 1982) was an Irish writer of over 70 romance novels as her maiden name Nina Conarain and under the pseudonym of Elizabeth Hoy from 1933 to 1980.

== Biography ==
Alice Nina Conarain was born in Dublin, Ireland. She married Mr. Hoysradt. She worked as a nurse, secretary-receptionist, and staff member of the Daily News in London. She disliked secretarial work, recalling that "It was decided that I should take a course in shorthand and typing and become a secretary, a prospect that appalled me. But I had no choice. No one believe that I would ever succeed in earning a living with my pen."

She started publishing romance novels in the 1930s at Mills & Boon under the pseudonym of Elizabeth Hoy, she also wrote as Nina Conarain at Arcadia House. Over thirty of her books were published by Harlequin. She was a close friend to writer Nina Boyle.

Conarain died in Maidenhead in 1982, at the age of 84.

== Bibliography ==
=== As Elizabeth Hoy ===
- Love in Apron Strings (1933)
- Roses in the Snow (1936)
- Sally in the Sunshine (1937) also published as Nurse Tennant
- Crown For a Lady (1937)
- Shadow of the Hills (1938)
- Stars over Egypt (1938)
- You Belong to Me (1938)
- You Took My Heart (1939) also published as Doctor Garth
- June for Enchantment (1939)
- Mirage for Love (1939)
- Runaway Bride (1939)
- Enchanted Wilderness (1940)
- Heart, Take Care! (1940)
- It Had to be You (1940)
- You Can't Lose Yesterday (1940)
- I'll Find You Again (1941)
- Take Love Easy (1941)
- Come Back My Dream (1942) also published as Nurse in Training
- Hearts at Random (1942)
- Proud Citadel (1942)
- Ask Only Love (1943)
- One Step from Heaven (1943)
- You Can't Live Alone (1943)
- Give Me New Wings (1944)
- Sylvia Sorelle (1944)
- Heart's Haven (1945)
- It's Wise to Forget (1945)
- Dear Stranger (1946)
- Sword in the Sun (1946)
- To Win a Paradise (1947)
- The Dark Loch (1948)
- Though I Bid Farewell (1948)
- Background to Hyacinthe (1949)
- Immortal Morning (1949)
- Silver Maiden (1951)
- The Web of Love (1951)
- When You Have Found Me (1951)
- White Hunter (1951)
- The Enchanted (1952)
- Fanfare for Lovers (1953)
- If Love Were Wise (1954)
- So Loved and So Far (1954)
- Who Loves Believes (1954)
- Snare the Wild Heart (1955)
- Young Doctor Kirkdene (1955)
- Because of Doctor Danville (1956)
- My Heart Has Wings (1957)
- Do Something Dangerous (1958)
- City of Dreams (1959)
- Dark Horse, Dark Rider (1960)
- Dear Fugitive (1960)
- The Door Into the Rose Garden (1961)
- Heart, Have You No Wisdom? (1962)
- Her Wild Voice Singing (1963)
- Homeward the Heart (1964)
- Flowering Desert (1965)
- The Faithless One (1966)
- Honeymoon Holiday (1967)
- My Secret Love (1967)
- Be More Than Dreams (1968)
- Music I Heard with You (1969)
- It Happened in Paris (1970)
- Into a Golden Land (1971)
- African Dream (1971)
- Immortal Flower (1972)
- That Island Summer (1973)
- The Girl in the Green Valley (1973)
- Shadows on the Sand (1974)
- The Blue Jacaranda (1975)
- Black Opal (1975)
- When the Dream Fades (1980)

=== As Nina Conarain ===
- "O'Toole's Miracle" (1935, short story)
- "The Temperance Tent" (1935, short story)
- 365 Days (1936, a short-short story collection co-edited with Kay Boyle and Laurence Vail)
- Give Me New Wings (1945)
- Shatter the Rainbow (1946)
- For Love's Sake Only (1951)
