= Rosalind Brett (author) =

British author

Lillian Warren
- Born: England, United Kingdom
- Occupation: Novelist
- Writing career
- Pen name: Rosalind Brett
- Period: 1950 - 1959
- Genre: Romantic novel

Lillian Warren, pseudonym Rosalind Brett (fl. 1950s) was a British author who wrote for Mills & Boon romance. As a prolific author of romance novels, she had two other pseudonyms, Kathryn Blair and Celine Conway. At the height of her career, Warren was considered one of publisher's superstars, who set high sales records and a standard for romances published during the 1950s. Joseph McAleer in his book Passion's Fortune: The Story of Mills and Boon, describes Brett's work as so sexy for the era, that it often had to be "watered down". According to McAleer, she is credited by Anne Weale as inventing the "punishing kiss". Brett/Warren came to Mills & Boon from Rich & Cowan, a publisher she felt didn't offer her enough support.

== Book notes ==
Rosalind Brett's romances from the 1950s are historically significant for the Mills & Boon series, by her choice of locations. Her stories take readers away from the British Isles, to East Africa — Rhodesia, Nyasaland, providing glimpses of Salisbury (present day Harare) and Bulawayo, the second largest city in what is now Zimbabwe. Other locations are French Morocco, Nigeria, South Africa, and the Pacific Islands. The main characters are at work trying to build prosperous lives in what were British, French and Portuguese colonies.

Publishing in the post-World War II period, Brett writes at the crossroads of history when, colonial rule once paramount in parts of Africa, Asia and the Pacific, would come to be challenged. While her stories depict the colonial life, absent from them is any underlying tension between rulers and subjects.

== Bibliography ==
As Rosalind Brett Single novels

- Secret Marriage - 1947, ASIN: B000WHQZ2I Amazon Standard Identification Number
- Pagan Interlude - 1947, ASIN: B000WHPKB0 Amazon Standard Identification Number
- For My Sins - 1966, ASIN: B0045B1694 Amazon Standard Identification Number
- A Cottage In Spain - 1955, September 1965 Harlequin Romance #952
- And No Regrets - 1950, Presents, #71 December 1974
- Brittle Bondage - 1951, 1962 (Mills & Boon); July 1969 Harlequin Romance #1319
- Dangerous Waters - 1960, December 1964 Harlequin Romance #877
- Elizabeth Browne, Children's Nurse - April, 1965 Harlequin Romance #908
- Fair Horizon - 1952, 1963 Harlequin Romance #760
- Hotel Mirador - 1959, February 1966 Harlequin Romance #989
- Nurse On Holiday - 1963 Harlequin Romance #740
- Love This Stranger - 1951, Presents, #55 August 1974
- Portrait Of Susan - 1956, December 1963 Harlequin Romance #783
- Stormy Haven - 1952, 1962 Harlequin Romance #656
- Sweet Waters - 1955, February 1964 Harlequin Romance #800
- Tangle In Sunshine - 1957, July 1964 Harlequin Romance #839
- The Bolambo Affair - 1961, August 1967 Harlequin Romance #1131
- The Girl At White Drift - 1962, April 1967 Harlequin Romance #1101
- The Reluctant Guest - 1959, November 1964 Harlequin Romance #869
- They Came To Valeira - 1950, Presents, #43 May 1974
- Too Young To Marry - 1958, September 1964 Harlequin Romance #856
- Towards The Sun - 1953, 1962 Harlequin Romance #693
- Whispering Palms - 1954, 1963 Harlequin Romance #731
- Winds In The Wilderness - 1954, 1963 Harlequin Romance #773
- Winds Of Enchantment - 1954, January 1968 Harlequin Romance #1176
- Young Tracy - 1958, April 1964 Harlequin Romance #815
