= Rosalind Brett =

English swimmer (born 1979)

Personal information
- Full name: Rosalind Jane Brett
- National team: Great Britain
- Born: 12 March 1979 (age 47) King's Lynn, England
- Height: 1.71 m (5 ft 7 in)
- Weight: 59 kg (130 lb)

Sport
- Sport: Swimming
- Strokes: Butterfly, freestyle
- College team: Loughborough University
Medal record
Women's swimming
Representing Great Britain
World Championships (LC)
Silver medal – second place	2001 Fukuoka	4×100 m freestyle
European Championships (LC)
Gold medal – first place	2006 Budapest	4×100 m medley
European Championships (SC)
Silver medal – second place	2000 Valencia	4×50 m freestyle
Bronze medal – third place	2000 Valencia	4×50 m medley
Bronze medal – third place	2006 Helsinki	4×50 m medley
Representing England
Commonwealth Games
Silver medal – second place	2002 Manchester	4×100 m freestyle
Silver medal – second place	2006 Melbourne	4×100 m freestyle

Rosalind Jane Brett (born 12 March 1979) is an English former competition swimmer.

== Swimming career ==
She represented Great Britain in the Olympics, FINA world championships and European championships, and England in the Commonwealth Games, winning seven medals in freestyle and medley relay events in international competition.

Brett represented Great Britain at the 2000 and 2004 Olympic Games in the relay events. She represented England at the 2002 and 2006 Commonwealth Games, winning silver medals on both occasions in the women's 4×100-metre freestyle relay.

She won the 1996 British Championship in 50 metres freestyle and was twice winner of the 100 metres freestyle (2001 and 2006).

== See also ==
- List of British records in swimming
