= Joyce Dingwell =

Australian writer

Enid Joyce Owen Starr Dingwell
- Born: Enid Joyce Owen Starr; 1909; City of Ryde, Sydney, Australia
- Died: 2 August 1997 (aged 87–88); Kincumber, Sydney, Australia
- Occupation: novelist
- Writing career
- Pen name: Joyce Dingwell, Kate Starr
- Language: English
- Period: 1931–1986
- Genre: Romance

Joyce Dingwell, née Enid Joyce Owen Starr (1909 in City of Ryde, Sydney, Australia – 2 August 1997 in Kincumber, Sydney), an Australian writer of more than 80 romance novels at Mills & Boon from 1931 to 1986, who also wrote under the pseudonym of Kate Starr. Her novel The House in the Timberwoods (1959), had been made into a motion picture: The Winds of Jarrah (1983).

== Biography ==
She was born Enid Joyce Owen Starr on 1909 in City of Ryde, New South Wales, Australia. She was the first Australian writer, who lived in Australia, to be published by Mills & Boon.

My romance writing began with an avid romance-reading mother who devoured so many romances each week that I decide to save library trips by supplementing the supply myself.

— Joyce Dingwell

== Bibliography ==
=== As Joyce Dingwell ===
==== Single novels ====
- Hum of the Forest (1931)
- Australian Hospital (1955)
- Greenfingers Farm (1955)
- Second Chance (1956)
- Will You Surrender? (1957)
- Wednesday's Children (1957) a.k.a. Nurse Trent's Children
- If Love You Hold (1958) a.k.a. Love and Dr. Benedict aka Doctor Benedict (USA)
- The Coral Tree (1958)
- Nurse Jess (1959)
- The Girl at Snowy River (1959)
- The House in the Timberwoods (1959)
- Tender Conquest (1960)
- Nurse Trent's Children (1961) a.k.a. Wednesday's Children
- The Third in the House (1961)
- The Wind and the Spray (1961)
- River Nurse (1962)
- The Boomerang Girl (1962)
- The New Zealander (1963)
- The English Boss (1964)
- The Kindly Giant (1964)
- The Timber Man (1964)
- Project Sweetheart (1965)
- The Man from the Valley (1966)
- A Taste for Love (1967)
- Clove Orange (1967)
- I and My Heart (1967)
- The Feel of Silk (1967)
- Nurse Smith, Cook (1968) a.k.a. No Females Wanted
- Hotel Southerly (1968/07)
- Venice Affair (1968/09)
- Demi-Semi Nurse (1969/01)
- Spanish Lace (1969/01)
- One String for Nurse Bow (1969/09)
- Crown of Flowers (1969/10)
- September Street (1969/11)
- The Drummer and the Song (1969/12)
- Mr. Victoria (1970/01)
- West of the River (1970/05) a.k.a. Guardian Nurse
- Pool of the Pink Lilies (1970/10)
- Nickel Wife (1970/12)
- A Thousand Candles (1971/05)
- Sister Pussycat (1971/10)
- Wife to Sim (1972/02)
- Red Ginger Blossom (1972/03)
- Friday's Laughter (1972/08)
- There Were Three Princes (1972/09)
- The Mutual Look (1973/07)
- The Habit of Love (1974/05)
- The Cattleman (1974/06)
- Flamingo Flying South (1974/07)
- The New Broom (1974/10)
- Love and Lucy Brown (1974/12)
- The Kissing Gate (1975/01)
- Cane Music (1975/05)
- Deep in the Forest (1975/10)
- Corporation Boss (1975/11)
- The Road Boss (1976/01)
- Echo of Rory (1976/03)
- Inland Paradise (1976/09)
- A Drift of Jasmine (1977/04)
- Remember September (1977/08)
- Year of the Dragon (1977/11)
- All the Days of Summer (1978/03)
- The Truth Game (1978/06)
- Tender Wings of Spring (1978/08)
- The Boss's Daughter (1978/09)
- The Angry Man (1979/06)
- Come Back to Love (1980/04)
- The All-the-Way Man (1980/12)
- A Man Like Brady (1981/03)
- Brother Wolf (1983/01)
- Arousing Touch (1983/08)
- Thousand Ways of Loving (1986/04)
- Indian Silk (1986/06)

==== Omnibus ====
- Red Ginger Blossom / Wife to Sim / The Pool of Pink Lilies (1982)
- Thousand Candles / The Mutual Look / There Were Three Prices (1983)

==== Collections in collaboration ====
- Orphan Bride / Full Tide / House in the Timberwoods (1971) (with Celine Conway and Sara Seale)
- Velvet Spur / The Habit of Love / Extraordinary Engagement (1979) (with Jane Arbor and Marjorie Lewty)
- Deep in the Forest / Lord of the Forest / When Winter Has Gone (1981) (with Rachel Ford and Hilda Pressley)
- The Man From Coral Bay / Corporation Boss / Glen of Sighs (1981) (with Jan Anderson and Lucy Gillen)

=== As Kate Starr ===
==== Single novels ====
- Dolan of Sugar Hills (1961)
- The Nurse most Likely (1962)
- Satin for the Bride (1963)
- The Enchanted Trap (1963)
- Dalton's Daughter (1964)
- Patricia and the Rosefields (1964)
- Sister for the Cruise (1964) a.k.a. Ship's Doctor
- Bells in the Wind (1966)
- Wrong Doctor John (1966)
