= Jean S. MacLeod =

British writer

Jean Sutherland MacLeod Walton
- Dundee Evening Telegraph, 1938
- Born: Jane Sutherland MacLeod; 20 January 1908; Glasgow, Scotland, UK
- Died: 11 April 2011 (aged 103); Yorkshire, England, UK
- Occupation: Novelist
- Spouse: Lionel Walton (1935–95)
- Children: 1
- Writing career
- Pen name: Jean S. MacLeod, Catherine Airlie
- Language: English
- Period: 1936–96
- Genre: Romance

Jean S. MacLeod (20 January 1908 – 11 April 2011) was a prolific British writer of over 130 romance novels from 1936 to 1996, she also used the pseudonym of Catherine Airlie.

== Biography ==
=== Personal life ===
Born Jane Sutherland MacLeod on 20 January 1908 in Glasgow, Scotland, the daughter of Elizabeth Allen and John MacLeod. She was actually named Jane, but her grandfather complained it was not Scottish enough, and it was changed to Jean. Her father, who was a civil engineer, moved her family with jobs. Her education began at Bearsden Academy, continued in Swansea and ended in Newcastle-upon-Tyne.

She worked in a sweet shop. She moved to North Yorkshire, England to marry with Major Lionel Walton on 1 January 1935, an electricity board executive, who died in 1995. They had a son, David Walton, who died two years before her. She died on 11 April 2011 in Yorkshire, England, at 103 years of age.

=== Writing career ===
MacLeod started writing stories for the magazine The People's Friend, before sold her first romance novel in 1936. She wrote contemporary romances, most of them were set in her native Scotland, or in exotic places like Spain or Caribbean, places that she normally visited for documented. From 1948 to 1965, she also published under the pseudonym of Catherine Airlie. She was the first author published in the Mills & Boon Romance Series.

MacLeod was member of the Romantic Novelists' Association, where she met the mediatic writer Barbara Cartland, who was not too friendly.

== Bibliography ==
=== As Jean S. MacLeod ===
- Life for Two (1936)
- Human Symphony (1937)
- Dangerous Obsession (1938)
- Mist Across the Hills (1938)
- Sequel to Youth (1938)
- Summer Rain (1938)
- Return to Spring (1939)
- Run Away From Love (1939) a.k.a. Nurse Companion
- The Rainbow Isle (1939)
- Heatherbloom (1940)
- Silent Bondage (1940) a.k.a. Doctor in Bondage
- The Lonely Farrow (1940)
- The Whim of Fate (1940)
- Forbidden Rapture (1941)
- One Way Out (1941)
- The Reckless Pilgrim (1941)
- The Shadow of a Vow (1941)
- Bleak Heritage (1942)
- Blind Journey (1942)
- Penalty for Living (1942)
- Reluctant Folly (1942)
- Flower O' the Broom (1943)
- The Circle of Doubt (1943)
- The Rowan Tree (1943)
- Unseen Tomorrow (1943)
- Lamont of Ardgoyne (1944)
- Two Paths (1944)
- Brief Fulfillment (1945)
- One Love (1945)
- The Bridge of Years (1945)
- This Much To Give (1945) a.k.a. Special Nurse
- Sown in the Wind (1946)
- The Tranquil Haven (1946)
- And We in Dreams (1947)
- The House of Oliver (1947)
- Ravenscrag (1948)
- The Chalet in the Sun (1948) a.k.a. Mountain Clinic
- Above the Lattice (1949) a.k.a. Doctor's Daughter
- To Morrow's Bargain (1949)
- Katherine (1950/01
- The Valley of Palms (1950)
- Once to Every Heart (1951)
- Roadway to the Past (1951)
- Cameron of Gare (1952)
- Music at Midnight (1952)
- The Silent Valley (1953)
- The Stranger in Their Midst (1953)
- Dear Doctor Everett (1954)
- The Man in Authority (1954) a.k.a. Nurse Lang
- After Long Journeying (1955)
- Master of Glenkeith (1955)
- My Heart's in the Highlands (1956)
- The Way in the Dark (1956)
- Journey in the Sun (1957) a.k.a. Doctors Together
- The Prisoner of Love (1957)
- Air Ambulance (1958)
- The Gated Road (1959)
- The Little Doctor (1960)
- The White Cockade (1960)
- The Silver Dragon (1961)
- Slave of the Wind (1962)
- The Dark Fortune (1962)
- Sugar Island (1964)
- The Black Cameron (1964)
- Crane Castle (1965)
- The Tender Glory (1965)
- The Wolf of Heimra (1965)
- The Drummer of Corrae (1966)
- Lament for a Lover (1967) a.k.a. Lament for Love
- The Bride of Mingalay (1967)
- The Master of Keills (1967)
- The Moonflower (1967)
- Summer Island (1968)
- The Joshua Tree (1970)
- The Light in the Tower (1971/03)
- The Way Through the Valley (1971/06)
- Moment of Decision (1972/04)
- Scent of Juniper (1972/08)
- Adam's Wife (1972/12) a.k.a. Adam's Daughter
- The Rainbow Days (1973/03)
- Over the Castle Wall (1974/04)
- Time Suspended (1975/01)
- The Phantom Pipes (1975/12)
- Journey into Spring (1976/06)
- Viking Song (1977/01)
- Island Stranger (1977/09)
- Search for Yesterday (1978/04)
- The Ruaig Inheritance (1978/09)
- Meeting in Madrid (1979/09)
- Brief Enchantment (1979/12)
- Black Sand, White Sand (1981/04)
- Cruel Deception (1981/08)
- Moreton's Kingdom (1981/10)
- Zamora (1983/04)
- A Distant Paradise (1984/01)
- Beyond the Reef (1984/01)
- Valley of the Snows (1985/10)
- The Olive Grove (1986/05)
- The Apollo Man (1986/08) a.k.a. The Romance of Emva
- After the Hurricane (1987/05)
- Call Back the Past (1989/02)
- Legacy of Doubt (1989/05)
- Shadow on the Hills (1989/09)
- Flame of Avila (1990/11)
- Tidal Wave (1991/02)
- Tidal Wave (1991/02)
- Home to the Hills (1992/08)
- A Handful of Shells (1993/02)
- The Jade Pagoda (1994/08)
- Keeper of the Trees (1995/08)
- Lovesome Hill (1996/05)

=== As Catherine Airlie ===
- The Wild Macraes (1948)
- From Such a Seed (1949)
- The Restless Years (1950)
- Fabric of Dreams (1951)
- Strange Recompense (1952)
- Hidden in the Wind (1953)
- The Green Rushes (1953)
- A Wind Sighing (1954)
- Nobody's Child (1954)
- The Valley of Desire (1955)
- The Ways of Love (1955)
- The Mountain of Stars (1956)
- The Unguarded Hour (1956)
- Land of Heart's Desire (1957)
- Red Lotus (1958)
- The Last of the Kintyres (1959)
- Shadow on the Sun (1960)
- One Summer's Day (1961)
- The Country of the Heart (1961)
- The Unlived Year (1962)
- Passing Strangers (1963) a.k.a. Nurse Jane in Teneriffe
- The Sea Change (1965) a.k.a. Doctor Overboard
