= List of works by Penny Jordan =

Penny Jordan was the most common pen-name used by prolific fiction writer Penelope Halsall. This is a comprehensive list of her novels and written works from her career which ended upon her death at 65, and includes works published posthumously. She used a range of different pen-names, from which this list derives its sequence.

== Caroline Courtney ==
=== Single novels ===
- Duchess in Disguise (1979)
- A Wager for Love (1979)
- Love Unmasked (1979)
- Guardian of the Heart (1979)
- Dangerous Engagement (1979)
- Love's Masquerade (1980)
- The Fortunes of Love (1980)
- The Romantic Rivals (1980)
- Heart of Honour (1981)
- Destiny's Duchess (1981)
- The Masquerading Heart (1981)
- Abandoned for Love (1981)
- The Tempestuous Affair (1981)
- Love of My Life (1981)
- Love Triumphant (1981)
- Lover's Victory (1981)
- The Courier of Love (1982)
- Love in Waiting (1982)
- Libertine in Love (1982)
- The Daring Heart (1982)
- Forbidden Love (1982)
- Hearts or Diamonds (1985)
- Prisoner of Passion (1985)
- Dual Enchantment (1985)
- Conspiracy of Kisses (1986)

== Melinda Wright ==
=== Single novels ===
- The Concorde Affair (1981)
- Love at 30,000 Feet (1982)
- Flight into Ecstasy (1983)

== Lydia Hitchcock ==
=== Single novels ===
- The Ducetti Lair (1981)
- The Geneva Touch (1982)

== Penny Jordan ==
=== Single Novels ===
- Falcon's Prey (1981)
- Tiger Man (1981)
- Marriage without Love (1981)
- Blackmail (1982)
- Long Cold Winter (1982)
- Caged Tiger (1982)
- Daughter of Hassan (1982)
- Northern Sunset (1982)
- Island of the Dawn (1982)
- An Unbroken Marriage (1982)
- Bought with His Name (1982)
- Escape from Desire (1982)
- Desire's Captive (1983)
- Forgotten Passion (1983)
- Man Hater (1983)
- Rescue Operation (1983)
- Flawed Marriage (1983)
- Phantom Marriage (1983)
- Sudden Engagement (1983)
- Passionate Protection (1983)
- Savage Atonement (1983)
- The Inward Storm (1984)
- Love's Choices (1984)
- Response (1984)
- Shadow Marriage (1984)
- Wanting (1984)
- Darker Side of Desire (1984)
- Rules of the Game (1984)
- Campaign for Loving (1985)
- Permission to Love (1985)
- Taken Over (1985)
- Time Fuse (1985)
- You Owe Me (1985)
- What You Made Me (1985)
- The Friendship Barrier (1985)
- Only One (1985)
- The Six-Month Marriage (1985)
- Exorcism (1985)
- Fire With Fire (1985)
- Injured Innocent (1985)
- The Hard Man (1985)
- Desire for Revenge (1985)
- Capable of Feeling (1986)
- A Man Possessed (1986)
- Return Match (1986)
- Desire Never Changes (1986)
- Research into Marriage (1986)
- A Reason for Marriage (1986)
- Loving (1986)
- Stronger Than Yearning (1986)
- Too Short a Blessing (1987)
- Passionate Relationship (1987)
- A Savage Adoration (1987)
- For One Night (1987)
- An Expert Teacher (1987)
- Substitute Lover (1987)
- Levelling the Score (1987)
- Fight for Love (1987)
- Payment in Love (1988)
- Special Treatment (1988)
- Force of Feeling (1988)
- Without Trust (1988)
- Potential Danger (1988)
- Lover's Touch (1988)
- Power Play (1988)
- A Reason for Being (1989)
- Beyond Compare (1989)
- Equal Opportunities (1989)
- Valentine's Night (1989)
- So Close and No Closer (1989)
- Free Spirit (1989)
- Bitter Betrayal (1989)
- Silver (1989)
- A Rekindled Passion (1989)
- Rival Attractions (1990)
- Time for Trust (1990)
- Unspoken Desire (1990)
- Breaking Away (1990)
- Out of the Night (1990)
- Game of Love (1990)
- The Hidden Years (1990)
- A Kind of Madness (1990)
- Second Time Loving (1990)
- Payment Due (1991)
- A Forbidden Loving (1991)
- A Time to Dream (1991)
- Dangerous Interloper (1991)
- Second-Best Husband (1991)
- A Cure for Love (1991)
- Stranger Form the Past (1991)
- Past Passion (1991)
- Law of Attraction (1992)
- Lesson to Learn (1992)
- Mistaken Adversary (1992)
- Lingering Shadows (1992)
- Past Loving (1992)
- Passionate Possession (1992)
- A Matter of Trust (1992)
- Tug of Love (1992)
- Yesterday's Echoes (1993)
- For Better for Worse (1993)
- French Leave (1994)
- Cruel Legacy (1994)
- Power Games (1995)
- Unwanted Wedding (1995)
- The Trusting Game (1995)
- Her Christmas Fantasy (1996)
- Stranger From The Past (1997)
- Mission: Make-Over (1997)
- To Love, Honour and Betray (1998)
- Wanting His Child (1999)
- One Intimate Night (1999)
- The City-Girl Bride (2001)
- Christmas Eve Wedding (2002)
- Now or Never (2003)
- Sweet Revenge (2005)
- The Christmas Bride (2006)
- Her Lover Her Husband (2006)
- The Italian Duke's Wife (2006)
- The Sheikh's Blackmailed Mistress (2008)
- The Boss's Marriage Arrangement (2008)

=== The Bride's Bouquet Series ===
1. Woman to Wed? (1996)
2. Best Man to Wed? (1996)
3. Too Wise to Wed? (1996)

- The Bride's Bouquet (Omnibus) (2000)
- Duet: Woman to Wed? / Best Man to Wed? (2005)

=== The Perfect Crightons Series ===
1. A Perfect Family (1997)
2. The Perfect Seduction (1997)
3. Perfect Marriage Material (1997)
4. The Perfect Match? (1997)
5. The Perfect Lover (1998)
6. The Perfect Sinner (1999)
7. The Perfect Father (2000)
8. A Perfect Night (2000)
9. Coming Home (2000)
10. Starting Over (2001)

- The Crightons: The Perfect Seduction / Perfect Marriage Material / The Perfect Match? (by Request 3's) (2001)
- Women and Love: The perfect lover / The perfect father / The perfect night (2002)

=== Fantasy in the Night Series ===
1. Fantasy for Two (1998)
2. One Night in His Arms (1998)

=== Sweet Revenge or Seduction Series ===
1. Mistress Assignment (1999)
2. Lover by Deception (1999)
3. A Treacherous Seduction (1999)
4. The Marriage Resolution (1999)

=== Sheikh's Arabian Nights Series ===
1. The Sheikh's Virgin Bride (2003)
2. One Night with the Sheikh (2003)
3. Possessed by the Sheikh (2005)
4. Taken By The Sheikh (2007)

=== Jet Set Wives Series ===
1. Bedding His Virgin Mistress (2005)
2. Expecting The Playboy's Heir (2005)
3. Blackmailing the Society Bride (2005)
- Jet Set Wives (Omnibus) (2008)

=== Silk Series ===
1. Silk (2008)
2. Sins (2009)
3. Scandals (2010)

=== The Leopardi Brothers Saga ===
1. Captive At the Sicilian Billionaire's Command (2009)
2. The Sicilian Boss's Mistress (2009)
3. The Sicilian's Baby Bargain (2009)

=== Needed: The world's Most Eligible Billionaires ===
1. The Wealthy Greek's Contract wife (2009)
2. The Italian Duke's Virgin Mistress (2010)
3. Marriage: To Claim His Twins (2010)

== Penny Jordan collaborative series ==
In her career, Jordan contributed the following pieces towards multi-author collaboration series.

=== For Her Eyes Only ===
- An Unforgettable Man (1995)

=== Dangerous Liaisons ===
- An Unforgettable Man (1995)

=== The Big Event ===
- Marriage Make Up (1998)

=== Amnesia ===
- Back in the Marriage Bed (2000)

=== Greek Tycoons ===
- The Demetrios Virgin (2001)
- The Mistress Purchase (2004)

=== Red-Hot Revenge ===
- The Marriage Demand (2001)

=== Wedlocked! ===
- The Blackmail Baby (2002)
- Marco's Convenient Wife (2002)
- Mistress to Her Husband (2004)

=== Do Not Disturb ===
- The Tycoon's Virgin (2002)

=== By Royal Command ===
- The Blackmail Marriage (2003)
- The Italian Duke's Mistress (2006)

=== Mistress to a Millionaire ===
- Mistress of Convenience (2004)
- The Mistress Purchase (2004)

=== Foreign Affairs ===
- Mistress of Convenience (2004)

=== Greek Tycoons ===
- The Mistress Purchase (2004)

=== Desert Brides ===
1. Prince of the Desert (2006)

=== Dinner At 8 ===
- The Christmas Bride (2006)

=== Uncut ===
- Master of Pleasure (2006)

=== The Royal House Of Niroli ===
1. The Future King's Pregnant Mistress (2007)
8. A Royal Bride At the Sheikh's Command (2008)

=== Mistress to a Millionaire ===
- Virgin For The Billionaire's Taking (2008)

== Penny Jordan collections ==
- Penny Jordan Collection (1984)
- Best of Penny Jordan: Falcon's Prey / Tiger Man (1986)
- Penny Jordan Omnibus: Shadow Marriage / Man-hater / Passionate Protection (1992)
- Penny Jordan Collection: Fire with Fire / Capable of Loving / Substitute Lover (1993)
- Two complete stories by Penny Jordan: Game of Love / Time for Trust (1995)
- Mistletoe Magic (1996)
- Marriage of Convenience: Loving / Injured Innocent / The Six-Month Marriage (2000)
- Collector's edition: A Perfect Family / To Love, Honor and Betray / The Perfect Sinner (2000)
- A Collection: Shadow Marriage / Man-Hater / Passionate Protection (2002)
- Duet: Stronger Than Yearning / Silver (2004)
- Sweet Seduction (2005)
- Duet: Rules of the Game / Passionate Possession (2005)
- Duet: Perfect Family / Fantasy for Two (2006)
- The Sheikh's Bride (2006)

== Penny Jordan omnibus in collaboration ==
- Sunsational (1991) (Fantasy by Emma Darcy / Rent-A-Bride by Emma Goldrick / You Owe Me by Penny Jordan / Lovers in the Afternoon by Carole Mortimer)
- Matched By Mistake (1996) (Passionate Protection by Penny Jordan / Hotline by Gina Wilkins / Forbidden Surrender by Carole Mortimer)
- Yours, Mine And Ours (1997) (Penny Jordan with Cathy Gillen Thacker and Marisa Carroll)
- Christmas Treats (1998) (Figgy Pudding by Penny Jordan / A man for all seasonings by Day Leclaire / All the trimmings by Lindsay Armstrong)
- Wedded Bliss (1999) (They're Wed Again by Penny Jordan / The Man She'll Marry by Carole Mortimer)
- A Man for Mum! (1999) (Wanting His Child by Penny Jordan / The Boss and the Baby by Leigh Michaels / One Mum Too Many by Vicki Lewis Thompson)
- Nearly Weds! (1999) (Making Sure of Sarah by Betty Neels / The Man She'll Marry by Carole Mortimer / They're Wed Again! by Penny Jordan
- Christmas Presents (1999) (Penny Jordan with Anne McAllister and Sally Wentworth)
- Latin Lovers (2000) (A Spanish Christmas by Penny Jordan / The Christmas Eve Bride by Lynne Graham / Christmas in Venice by Lucy Gordon)
- Wed Again! (2001) (They're Wed Again! by Penny Jordan / Anne Mather / The Man She'll Marry by Carole Mortimer)
- Christmas with a Latin Lover (2001) (The Christmas Eve Bride by Lynne Graham / A Spanish Christmas by Penny Jordan / Christmas in Venice by Lucy Gordon)
- What Women Want! (2002) (Penny Jordan with Darcy Maguire)
- City Girls (2002) (Penny Jordan with Liz Fielding and Jessica Hart)
- Winter Weddings (2002) (Christmas Eve Wedding by Penny Jordan / A Scandalous Courtship by Gail Whitiker / Snowbound Sweetheart by Judy Christenberry)
- For Love Or Money (2003) (Unwanted Wedding by Penny Jordan / The Borghese Bride by Sandra Marton)
- Greek Millionaires (2004) (Penny Jordan with Anne McAllister and Sara Craven)
- Strictly Business (2004) (The Temp and the Tycoon / The Fiance Deal by Liz Fielding with Penny Jordan and Hannah Bernard)
- Boardroom to Bedroom (2005) (The Boss's Marriage Arrangement by Penny Jordan / His Darling Valentine by Carole Mortimer)
- Plain Jane Makeover (2005) (Penny Jordan with Miranda Lee and Barbara McMahon)
- The Mills and Boon Collection: 3 Full-Length Stories (2006) (Penny Jordan with Margaret Way and Caroline Anderson)
- Marco's Convenient Wife Penny Jordan / The Mistress's Secret by Julia James) (2006)
- The Innocence Collection (2007) (Innocent Bride by Penny Jordan / Innocent Desires by Carole Mortimer / Innocent Seduction by Kay Thorpe)

== Graphic novels ==
- Response: Graphic Novel (2005) art by Takako Hashimoto

== Annie Groves ==
=== Pride Family Series ===
1. Ellie Pride, 2003
2. Connie's Courage, 2004
3. Hettie of Hope Street, 2005

=== World War II Series ===
1. Goodnight Sweetheart, 2006 (subsequently republished as A Mother's Blessing)
2. Some Sunny Day;, 2006
3. The Grafton Girls, 2007
4. As Time Goes By, 2007

=== Campion Family Series ===
- Across the Mersey, 2008
- Daughters of Liverpool, 2008
- The Heart of the Family, 2009
- Where the Heart Is, 2009
- When the Lights Go On Again, 2010
