= Lindsay Armstrong =

South African-Australian writer

- Born: Gillian Smith; South Africa
- Died: 28 December 2021; Australia
- Citizenship: Australian
- Occupation: Novelist
- Partner: Dave William Crowe
- Children: Anabel Stapleton, Susan Walsh, Matthew Crowe, Sally Minty, David Crowe Jr
- Writing career
- Pen name: Lindsay Armstrong
- Period: 1981–2014
- Genre: Romantic novel

Lindsay Armstrong is a popular South African-Australian writer of over 65 romance novels. She published her novels in Mills & Boon's since 1981. Armstrong was born and raised in South Africa, and married a New Zealand-born man who worked in West Africa. Their first three children were born in South Africa, they had other two children, one in London, England, and one in Australia. She currently lives in Australia. Lindsay Armstrong, born Gillian Smith, died Gillian Crowe, on 28 December 2021

== Bibliography ==
=== Single novels ===
- Spitfire (1981)
- My Dear Innocent (1981)
- Melt a Frozen Heart (1982)
- Enter My Jungle (1982)
- Perhaps Love (1983)
- Don't Call it Love (1984)
- Save My Soul from Sin (1985)
- Saved from Sin (1985)
- Finding Out (1985)
- Love Me Not (1985)
- An Elusive Mistress (1986)
- Some Say Love (1986)
- Surrender, My Heart (1986)
- Standing on the Outside (1986)
- The Heart of the Matter (1987)
- The Shadow of Moonlight (1987)
- When the Night Grows Cold (1987)
- Reluctant Wife (1987)
- When You Leave Me (1987)
- Heat of the Moment (1988)
- Marrying Game (1989)
- A Love Affair (1989)
- One More Night (1989)
- Dark Captor (1991)
- The Director's Wife (1991)
- An Unusual Affair (1991)
- Leave Love Alone (1991)
- The Seduction Stakes (1992)
- Unwilling Mistress (1993)
- A Difficult Man (1993)
- An Unsuitable Wife (1994)
- Trial by Marriage (1994)
- When Enemies Marry... (1995)
- Dangerous Deceiver (1995)
- A Careful Wife (1996)
- Married for Real (1996)
- A Marrying Man? (1997)
- In Bed with a Stranger (1998)
- He's My Husband (1998)
- Wildcat Life (1999)
- Marriage Ultimatum (1999)
- The Hired Fiancee (2000)
- By Marriage Divided (2000)
- Wife in the Making (2001)
- At the Cattleman's Command (2006)

=== A Year Down Under Series Multi-Author ===
- A Dangerous Lover (1992)

=== Pages & Privileges Series Multi-Author ===
- A Masterful Man (1994)

=== The Australians Series Multi-Author ===
3. Playboy Lover (1996)
10. Wildcat Wife (1997)
16. A Question of Marriage (2001)
28. His Convenient Proposal (2002)
30. The Unconventional Bride (2003)
34. The Australian's Convenient Bride (2004)

=== Nanny Wanted Series Multi-Author ===
- Accidental Nanny (1997)

=== Amnesia Series Multi-Author ===
- Outback Mistress (1998)

=== Expecting! Series Multi-Author ===
- Having His Babies (1999)
- The Rich Man's Virgin (2005)

=== The Marriage Quest Series Multi-Author ===
- The Bridegroom's Dilemma (2000)

=== Wedlocked! Series Multi-Author ===
- The Unexpected Husband (2000)
- The Constantin Marriage (2002)
- Marriage on Command (2002)
- A Bride for His Convenience (2004)
- The Australian's Housekeeper Bride (2007)

=== The Millionaire Affair Series Multi-Author ===
- The Millionaire's Marriage Claim (2005)

=== Innocent Mistress, Virgin Bride Series Multi-Author ===
- From Waif to His Wife (2007)

=== An Innocent in His Bed Series Multi-Author ===
- The Cattle Baron's Virgin Wife (2008)

=== Hired: For the Boss's Pleasure Series Multi-Author ===
- The Billionaire Boss's Innocent Bride (2008)

=== Omnibus In Collaboration ===
- Marriage of Convenience (1995) (with Sara Craven) (Marrying Game, Marriage Deal)
- Christmas Treats (1998) (with Penny Jordan and Day Leclaire)
- The Yew Tree Collection (2001) (with Melanie Farrell, Rachel Friend and Anna Schell)
- An Australian Christmas (2002) (with Emma Darcy and Miranda Lee)
- Outback Proposals (2006) (with Barbara Hannay and Jessica Hart)
- In the Australian's Bed (2008) (with Miranda Lee and Melanie Milburne)
- The Millionaire's Virgin (2009) (with Susan Stephens and Sophie Weston)
- A Convenient Marriage (2009) (with Liz Fielding and Betty Neels)
- Her Outback Boss (2009) (with Barbara Hannay and Sharon Kendrick)
