= Emma Darcy =

Australian husband–wife writing team

Wendy Brennan
- Born: 28 November 1940; Dorrigo, New South Wales, Australia
- Died: 12 December 2020 (aged 80); Forresters Beach, New South Wales, Australia
- Occupation: Novelist
- Writing career
- Pen name: Emma Darcy
- Period: 1983–2013
- Genres: Romance novels, suspense

Frank Brennan
- Born: 1936
- Died: 1995 (aged 58–59)
- Occupation: Novelist
- Writing career
- Pen name: Emma Darcy
- Period: 1983–1995
- Genre: Romance novels

Emma Darcy is the pseudonym used by the Australian husband–wife writing team of Wendy Brennan (28 November 1940 – 12 December 2020, in Dorrigo, New South Wales, Australia) and Frank Brennan (1936 – 1995). They wrote, in collaboration, over 45 romance novels. After Frank's death, Wendy continued writing, for a total of 106 romance novels.

According to Wendy's obituary in the Sydney Herald, "she was Australia’s bestselling romantic novelist"; she was inducted into the Romance Writers of Australia Hall of Fame in 2014.

== Personal life ==
Wendy Brennan was the daughter of a schoolteacher and a dressmaker who had three other children, one of whom was Miranda Lee. She was educated at St Joseph's College, Gosford; the University of Sydney, where she received an honours degree in Latin; and Sydney Teachers' College. She taught English and French at high school level, before turning to computer programming—apparently making her "the first woman computer programmer in the southern hemisphere."

Frank Brennan was a pharmacist and businessman. They married in 1964. After having three sons, Wendy stopped paid work to care for them. They lived on the Central Coast of New South Wales.

Wendy Brennan died at Forresters Beach, survived by her sister, Miranda Lee (also a romance writer); her 3 three sons; and 5 grandchildren.

=== Writing career ===
Voracious readers, Frank and Wendy decided to write their own novels under the pseudonym Emma Darcy. They sent their first three attempts to Jacqui Bianchi, a major editor at Mills and Boon, whom they "loved working with." Their first novel, rewritten at Bianchi's insistence, appeared in print in 1983.

Between 1983 and 2001 they sold 60 million books, averaging six new books per year. After Frank's death in 1995, Brennan's writing was supported by Marilyn Callaghan (acting as "project manager and sounding board") and by cowriting with Miranda Lee (still under the name Emma Darcy).

Ultimately, Darcy authored 106 category romances, all published by Harlequin Mills & Boon. Her romance novels sold "between 500,000 and two million copies" each, for a total of "over 71 million copies worldwide, regularly appearing in the bestseller lists in both the UK and US."

In 2002, Darcy's first crime novel Who Killed Angelique? (Pan MacMillan), won the Ned Kelly Award for Best First Novel. Her second, Who Killed Bianca (2003; Pan MacMillan), was a finalist for the Ned Kelly Award for Best Novel.

==== Emma Darcy Award Contest ====
For the 10th anniversary of the Emma Darcy pseudonym and their first publications, the Brennans, in association with the Romance Writers of Australia, created the "Emma Darcy Award Contest" in 1993 to support unpublished authors to finish their manuscripts. The prize was A$2,000 and a guarantee that the manuscript would be read by an acquiring editor from Mills & Boon. The Contest ran until 2004.

Winners:

- 1994 – Tracey Cooper-Posey
- 1995 – Ginny Gibbs for The Last Resort
- 1996 – Bronwyn Jameson for For Love or Money
- 1997 – Fiona Brand for Cullen's Bride
- 1998 – Jill Watkinson for Black Pearl
- 1999 – Yvonne Lindsay for The Father Deal
- 2000 – Lucy Forster & Danielle Ellis
- 2001 – Laura Ruch for Full Circle (retitled The Tie that Binds)

== Bibliography as Emma Darcy ==
=== Single Novels ===
- Tangle of Torment (1983)
- Twisting Shadows (1983)
- A World Apart (1984)
- Fantasy (1985)
- Don't Play Games (1985)
- Song of a Wren (1985)
- Point of Impact (1985)
- The Impossible Woman (1985)
- Man in the Park (1986)
- Woman of Honour (1986)
- Blind Date (1986)
- Don't Ask Me Now (1986)
- The Wrong Mirror (1986)
- The Unpredictable Man (1986)
- One That Got Away (1987)
- Strike at the Heart (1987)
- Positive Approach (1987)
- Mistress of Pillatoro (1987)
- Whirlpool of Passion (1987)
- Always Love (1988)
- The Falcon's Mistress (1988)
- A Priceless Love (1988)
- Aloha Bride (1988)
- The Ultimate Choice (1989)
- The Power and the Passion (1989)
- Pattern of Deceit (1989)
- The Colour of Desire (1990)
- Too Strong to Deny (1990)
- One-woman Crusade (1990)
- Bride of Diamonds (1990)
- To Tame a Wild Heart (1992)
- Breaking Point (1992)
- High Risk (1992)
- The Wedding (1992)
- The Seduction of Keira (1992)
- The Velvet Tiger (1992)
- An Impossible Dream (1993)
- The Upstairs Lover (1993)
- A Very Stylish Affair (1993)
- The Last Grand Passion (1993)
- The Sheikh's Revenge (1993)
- A Wedding to Remember (1994)
- In Need of a Wife (1994)
- Burning with Passion (1995)
- The Fatherhood Affair (1995)
- The Father of Her Child (1996)
- Jack's Baby (1996)
- Last Stop Marriage (1996)
- Craving Jamie (1997)
- The Secrets Within (1997)
- Marriage Meltdown (1997)
- Merry Christmas (1997)
- The Sheikh's Seduction (1998)
- The Marriage Decider (1999)
- A Marriage Betrayed (1999)
- Bride of His Choice (1999)
- Mistress to a Tycoon (2001)
- The Sweetest Revenge (2001)
- The Hot-blooded Groom (2001)
- Claiming His Mistress (2001)
- A Spanish Marriage (2004)
- His Bought Mistress (2004)
- The Billionaire's Scandalous Marriage (2007)
- Filling All the Holes (2007)
- Three's Never a Crowd (2008)
- The Master Player (2009)
- The Billionaire's Housekeeper Mistress (2010)
- Hidden Mistress, Public Wife (2011)
- The Costarella Conquest (2011)
- An Offer She Can't Refuse (2012)
- The Incorrigible Playboy (2012)
- His Most Exquisite Conquest (2013)

=== James Family Series ===
1. Ride the Storm (1991)
2. Dark Heritage (1992)
3. The Shining of Love (1994)
4. The Bedroom Surrender (2003)

=== Kings of the Outback Series ===
1. The Cattle King's Mistress (2000)
2. The Playboy King's Wife (2000)
3. The Pleasure King's Bride (2000)
- Kings of the Outback (omnibus) (2004)

=== Who Killed...? Series ===
1. Who Killed Angelique? (2001)
2. Who Killed Bianca? (2002)
3. Who Killed Camilla? (2003)

=== Kings of Australia Series ===
1. The Arranged Marriage (2002)
2. The Bridal Bargain (2002)
3. The Honeymoon Contract (2002)
- Kings of Australia (omnibus) (2005)

=== The Outback Knights ===
1. The Outback Marriage Ransom (2004)
2. The Outback Wedding Takeover (2004)
3. The Outback Bridal Rescue (2004)

=== A Year Down Under Series Multi-Author ===
- Heart of the Outback (1993)
- No Risks, No Prizes (1993)

=== Pages & Privileges Series Multi-Author ===
- Climax of Passion (1995)

=== From Here to Paternity Series Multi-Author ===
- Mischief and Marriage (1996)

=== This Time, Forever Series Multi-Author ===
- Their Wedding Day (1996)

=== Scandals! Series Multi-Author ===
- Seducing the Enemy (1997)

=== Man Talk Series Multi-Author ===
- Fatherhood Fever! (1998)

=== Nanny Wanted Series Multi-Author ===
- Inherited, One Nanny (1998)

=== Australians Series Multi-Author ===
1. Outback Heat (1998)
13. The Marriage Risk (2000)
26. The Blind-Date Bride (2003)

=== Expecting! Series Multi-Author ===
- Having Leo's Child (1999)

=== Passion Series Multi-Author ===
- The Secret Mistress (1999)
- The Billionaire Bridegroom (2003)

=== In Love With Her Boss Series Multi-Author ===
- His Boardroom Mistress (2003)
- The Playboy Boss's Chosen Bride (2006)

=== Mistress to a Millionaire Series Multi-Author ===
- The Bedroom Surrender (2003)
- His Bought Mistress (2004)

=== The Ramirez Bride Series Multi-Author ===
1. The Ramirez Bride (2005)

=== Italian Husbands Series Multi-Author ===
- The Italian's Stolen Bride (2005)

=== Latin Lovers Series Multi-Author ===
- The Secret Baby Revenge (2006)

=== Desert Brides Series Multi-Author ===
- Traded to the Sheikh (2006)

=== Ruthless! Series Multi-Author ===
- The Playboy Boss's Chosen Bride (2006)
- The Billionaire's Captive Bride (2007)
- The Billionaire's Scandalous Marriage (2007)
- Bought For Revenge, Bedded For Pleasure (2008)
- Ruthlessly Bedded By the Italian Billionaire (2008)
- Ruthless Billionaire, Forbidden Baby (2009)

=== Collections ===
- The Emma Darcy Duet (1993)
- The Collection (Seasonal Products) (1998)
- Conveniently Yours (1999)
- Seduced (2002)
- Red-hot Passion (2003)
- The Bedroom Surrender / Mistress to a Millionaire (2003)
- Man in the Park / Point of Impact (2004)
- Power and the Passion / Burning with Passion (2004)
- Mistress to a Tycoon / Jack's Baby (2005)
- Jack's Baby / Craving Jamie (2005)
- Hot-blooded affairs: containing The Marriage Risk and The Hot-Blooded Groom (2008)
- Outback Grooms (2008)
- Secret Mistress / Marriage Betrayed (2008)

=== Omnibus in collaboration ===
- Sunsational (1991) (with Emma Goldrick, Penny Jordan and Carole Mortimer)
- Father Knows Last: High Risk, Guilty Passion (1996) (with Jacqueline Baird)
- Passion with a Vengeance (1998) (with Jacqueline Baird and Sara Craven)
- The Man She Married (1999) (with Annette Broadrick and Ann Major)
- Desert Heat (1999) (with Lynne Graham and Sandra Marton)
- Mothers-to-be (1999) (with Lynne Graham and Leigh Michaels)
- Father and Child (2000) (with Jacqueline Baird and Sandra Marton)
- Desert Destinies (2001) (with Helen Brooks and Mary Lyons)
- A Christmas Seduction (2001) (with Helen Brooks and Catherine Spencer)
- Latin Liaisons (2002) (with Lynne Graham)
- An Australian Christmas (2002) (with Lindsay Armstrong and Miranda Lee)
- Boardroom Baby (2003) (with Sandra Field and Kim Lawrence)
- The Pregnancy Surprise (2003) (with Caroline Anderson and Gayle Wilson)
- Australian Tycoons (2004) (with Marion Lennox and Margaret Way)
- Seduced by a Sultan (2004) (with Liz Fielding and Sandra Marton)
- Pregnant Brides (2004) (with Sandra Field and Carol Marinelli)
- Risque Business (2005) (with Liz Fielding and Sharon Kendrick)
- Her Playboy Challenge / The Outback Bridal Rescue (2005) (with Barbara Hannay)
- Outback Desire (2006) (with Carol Marinelli and Margaret Way)
- Billionaire Grooms (2006) (with Leigh Michaels and Sara Wood)
- More Than a Mistress (2006) (with Anne Mather and Catherine Spencer)
- Sweet Revenge (2006) (with Sara Craven and Kim Lawrence)
- More Than a Mistress (2006) (with Anne Mather and Catherine Spencer)
- Blind-Date Grooms (2007) (with Sara Craven and Jessica Hart)
- From Boardroom to Bedroom (2008) (with Kim Lawrence and Nicola Marsh)
- The Italian's Love-Child (2009) (with Sara Craven and Diana Hamilton)
- Ruthless (2009) (with Helen Bianchin and Miranda Lee)
- Love-Slave to the Sheikh / Traded to the Sheikh / At the Sheikh's Command (2009) (with Miranda Lee and Kate Walker)
- Hired: A Bride for the Boss (2009) (with Susan Meier and Leigh Michaels)
- At the Billionaire's Bidding (2009) (with Sharon Kendrick and Melanie Milburne)
- Purchased for Passion (2009) (with Julia James and Annie West)

=== Nonfiction ===
- The Secrets of Successful Romance Writing (1995)
