= Emma Robinson =

Emma Robinson may refer to:

- Emma Robinson (rower) (born 1971), Canadian rower
- Emma Robinson (Irish swimmer) (born 1978), retired Irish swimmer
- Emma Robinson (New Zealand swimmer) (born 1994), Olympic swimmer from New Zealand
- Emma Robinson, series of novels by Linda Sole
- Emma Robinson (author) (1814–1890), British author
