= Emma Goldrick =

American husband-and-wife writing team

Emma Elizabeth Jean Sutcliffe Goldrick
- Born: February 7, 1923; Puerto Rico
- Died: November 20, 2008 (aged 85); Massachusetts, United States
- Occupation: Novelist
- Writing career
- Pen name: Emma Goldrick
- Period: 1983–1997
- Genre: Romantic novel

Robert N. Goldrick
- Born: March 22, 1919; Massachusetts, United States
- Died: January 22, 1996 (aged 76); New Bedford, Massachusetts, United States
- Occupation: Novelist
- Writing career
- Pen name: Emma Goldrick
- Period: 1983–1996
- Genre: Romantic novel

Emma Goldrick was the pseudonym used by the married writing team formed by Emma Elizabeth Jean Sutcliffe (February 7, 1923, in Puerto Rico – November 20, 2008) and Robert N. Goldrick (March 22, 1919, in Massachusetts, United States – January 22, 1996). Under this name they wrote 41 romance novels published by Mills & Boon between 1983 and 1996. After Robert's death, Emma wrote her last book, "The Ninety-Day Wife", in his memory.

== Bibliography ==
=== Single novels ===
- And Blow Your House Down (1983)
- Miss Mary's Husband (1985)
- Ice Lady (1985)
- Night Bells Blooming (1985)
- The Trouble With Bridges (1985)
- Rent-a-bride Ltd. (1985)
- Daughter of the Sea (1985)
- Thunder Over Eden (1985)
- The Over-Mountain Man (1985)
- Hidden Treasures (1986)
- If Love be Blind (1987)
- King of the Hill (1987)
- Temporary Paragon (1987)
- Madeleine's Marriage (1988)
- My Brother's Keeper (1988)
- To Tame a Tycoon (1988)
- Pilgrim's Promise (1988)
- A Heart As Big As Texas (1989)
- The Girl He Left Behind (1990)
- Love Is in the Cards (1990)
- Silence Speaks for Love (1990)
- Mississippi Miss (1990)
- Summer Storms (1991)
- Doubly Delicious (1991)
- Smuggler's Love (1991)
- Loveable Katie Lovewell (1991)
- The Widow's Mite (1992)
- Spirit of Love (1992)
- Baby Makes Three (1993)
- The Unmarried Bride (1993)
- The Balleymore Bride (1994)
- The Ninety-Day Wife (1997)

=== Latimore Saga ===
- The Road (1984)
- Tempered by Fire (1986)
- The Latimore Bride (1988)
- Faith, Hope and Marriage (1995)
- Bringing Up Babies (1996)

=== First Class Series Multi-Author ===
- A Touch of Forgiveness (1990)

=== Kids & Kisses Series Multi-Author ===
- Leonie's Luck (1994)
- Faith, Hope and Marriage (1995)

=== Babies & Bachelors USA Series Multi-Author ===
- The Baby Caper (1995)

=== Holding Out for a Hero Series Multi-Author ===
- Husband Material (1996)
- Bringing Up Babies (1996)

=== Baby Boom Series Multi-Author ===
- Bringing Up Babies (1996)

=== Omnibus in collaboration ===
- Blind to Love (1988) (with Connie Bennett and Rebecca Winters)
- Sunsational (1991) (with Emma Darcy, Penny Jordan and Carole Mortimer)
- Just Add Children: Perfect Solution, Doubly Delicious (1995) (with Catherine George)
- The Parent Trap (1997) (with Helen Brooks)
- Love and Marriage (1999) (with Betty Neels)
- Blind Passions (1999) (with Miranda Lee and Rebecca Winters)
- A Tender Christmas (2000) (with Liz Fielding and Leigh Michaels)
