= Carole Mortimer =

British novelist (born 1960)

- Born: 1960 (age 65–66); England
- Occupation: Novelist
- Spouse: Peter
- Children: 4
- Writing career
- Pen name: Carole Mortimer
- Period: 1978–present
- Genre: Romance
- Website: www.carolemortimer.co.uk

Carole Mortimer (born 1960 in England) is a popular British writer of over 150 romance novels since 1978. She was one of Mills & Boon's youngest authors, and now is one of their most popular and prolific authors.

== Biography ==
Carole Mortimer was born in around 1960 in a very rural hamlet in the east of England, and she had two brothers. She studied only one year of nursing, and ended up working in the computer department of a well-known stationery company, where she started to write her first manuscript.

The manuscript was rejected by Mills & Boon, but the second was accepted and was published in 1978 as The Passionate Winter. She became one of the youngest and most prolific Mills & Boon's authors. She celebrated the publication of her 100th book, 20 years after her debut, and 30 years after this, she published her first historical novels, in the Mills & Boon Historical series.

In 2012 she was recognised by Queen Elizabeth II for her 'outstanding service to literature'. In 2014 she received a Pioneer of Romance Award from Romantic Times in the US.

In 2015 she started writing her first indie series called Alpha, as well as her Harlequin Mills & Boon books. And on 15 March 2015 she published her 200th book, titled Shadow Alpha, which was recognised, along with her other achievements by being awarded the 2015 RWA Nora Roberts Lifetime Achievement Award.

Carole married to Peter, father to two children, they had four sons more, and now the family is formed by six children (with 22 years of difference between the first-born and the unexpected youngest child.

== Bibliography ==
=== Single novels ===
- The Passionate Winter (1978)
- The Tempestuous Flame (1979)
- Tempted by Desire (1979)
- Only Lover (1979)
- Savage Interlude (1979)
- Deceit of a Pagan (1980)
- Engaged to Jarrod Stone (1980)
- Fear of Love (1980)
- Yesterday's Scars (1980)
- Brand of Possession (1980)
- Living Together (1980)
- Devil Lover (1981)
- Flame of Desire (1981)
- Ice in His Veins (1981)
- Satan's Master (1981)
- First Love, Last Love (1981)
- Freedom to Love (1981)
- Point of No Return (1981)
- Forbidden Surrender (1982)
- Love's Duel (1982)
- Captive Loving (1982)
- Shadowed Stranger (1982)
- Burning Obsession (1982)
- Red Rose for Love (1982)
- Forgotten Lover (1982)
- Elusive Lover (1982)
- Golden Fever (1982)
- Passion from the Past (1982)
- Perfect Partner (1982)
- Hidden Love (1982)
- Fantasy Girl (1983)
- Love Unspoken (1983)
- Love's Only Deception (1983)
- Sensual Encounter (1983)
- Lifelong Affair (1983)
- Undying Love (1983)
- Pagan Enchantment (1983)
- The Failed Marriage (1983)
- Subtle Revenge (1983)
- Heaven Here on Earth (1983)
- Hard to get (1984)
- Lost Love (1984)
- Untamed (1984)
- Unwilling Desire (1984)
- Gypsy (1985)
- A No Risk Affair (1985)
- Tempestuous Affair (1985)
- Passionate Lover (1985)
- Trust in Tomorrow (1985)
- A Past Revenge (1985)
- Lovers in the Afternoon (1985)
- Cherish Tomorrow (1985) aka Trust in Tomorrow
- The Devil's Price (1985)
- Lady Surrender (1985)
- Darkness into Light (1985)
- Knight's Possession (1985)
- Glass Slippers and Unicorns (1986)
- The Wade Dynasty (1986)
- No Longer a Dream (1986)
- Hawk's Prey (1986)
- Merlyn's Magic (1986)
- Velvet Promise (1986)
- A Rogue and a Pirate (1986)
- After the Loving (1987)
- Tangled Hearts (1987)
- Taggart's Woman (1987)
- Witchchild (1987) aka Just One Night
- Secret Passion (1987)
- Wish for the Moon (1987)
- Uncertain Destiny (1987)
- Elusive as the Unicorn (1989)
- Memories of the Past (1991)
- Romance of a Lifetime (1991)
- The Jilted Bridegroom (1992)
- Mother of the Bride (1992)
- Private Lives (1992)
- Elusive Obsession (1992)
- Gracious Lady (1993)
- Return Engagement (1993)
- Hunter's Moon (1993)
- War of Love (1994)
- The One and Only (1995)
- One-man Woman (1996)
- Wildest Dreams (1997)
- A Marriage to Remember (1997)
- Married by Christmas (1998)
- Married by Contract (1998)
- Jilted (1998)
- Joined by Marriage (1998)
- Trials by Marriage (1999)
- A Man to Marry (1999)
- The Yuletide Engagement (1999)
- A Yuletide Seduction (1999)
- Their Engagement Is Announced (2000)
- Bound by Contract (2000)
- The Secret Virgin (2001)
- The Fiance Fix (2002)
- Keeping Luke's Secret (2002)
- In Separate Bedrooms (2003)
- His Bid for a Bride (2004)
- Claiming His Christmas Bride (2004)
- The Vengeance Affair (2004)
- Christmas Night Miracle (2006)
- The Innocent Virgin (2006)
- Meant to Wed (2007)
- The Venetian's Midnight Mistress (2008)
- Bedded for the Spaniard's Pleasure (2009)
- Pregnant with the Billionaire's Baby (2009)
- The Virgin Secretary's Impossible Boss (2009)
- The Infamous Italian's Secret Baby (2009)
- His Christmas Virgin (2010)
- Surrender to the past (2011)
- The Talk of Hollywood (2012)

=== King-Hamilton Series ===
1. Trust in Summer Madness (1983)
2. Everlasting Love (1984)

=== Bennett Series ===
1. One Chance at Love (1988)
2. To Love Again (1988)
3. The Loving Gift (1988)
4. A Christmas Affair (1990)

=== Quinlan Series ===
1. The Fated Attraction (1991)
2. Saving Grace (1992)

=== To Bachelor Series ===
==== To Be Bachelor Brothers Sub-Series ====
1. To Woo a Wife (1998)
2. To Be a Husband (1998)
3. To Be a Bridegroom (1999)

==== To Bachelor Sisters Sub-Series ====
1. To Mend a Marriage (2000)
2. To Have a Husband (2000)
3. To Become a Bride (2001)
4. To Make a Marriage (2001)

==== To Marry Bachelor Cousins Sub-Series ====
1. To Marry McKenzie (2002)
2. To Marry McCloud (2002)
3. To Marry McAllister (2002)

=== The Calendar Mistress Series ===
1. His Cinderella Mistress (2003)
2. The Unwilling Mistress (2004)
3. The Deserving Mistress (2004)

=== The Prince Brothers Series ===
1. Prince's Passion (2005)
2. Prince's Pleasure (2005)
3. The Prince's Love-Child (2006)
- The Prince Brothers: Satisfaction Guaranteed! (2009)

=== Sicilian Gambrellis Saga ===
1. The Sicilian's Ruthless Marriage Revenge (2007)
2. At The Sicilian Count's Command (2008)
3. The Sicilian's Innocent Mistress (2008)

=== Virgin Brides and Arrogant Husbands Series ===
- The Virgin Secretary's Impossible Boss (2009)

=== Nine To Five Series Multi-Author ===
- Two's Company (1995)
- His Very Personal Assistant (2005)

=== Nanny Wanted! Series Multi-Author ===
- The Diamond Bride (1998)

=== Do Not Disturb Series Multi-Author ===
- Liam's Secret Son (2001)
- An Enigmatic Man (2003)

=== Wedlocked! Series Multi-Author ===
- Bride by Blackmail (2003)
- Billionaires Marriage Bargain (2007)

=== In Love With Her Boss Series Multi-Author ===
9. His Very Personal Assistant (2005)

=== Dinner at 8 Series Multi-Author ===
- Wife by Contract, Mistress by Demand (2007)

=== Expecting! Series Multi-Author ===
- Pregnant By The Millionaire (2007)

=== The Notorious St. Claires (Historical) ===
- At the Duke's Service (2009)
- The Duke's Cinderella Bride (2009)
- The Rake's Wicked Proposal (2009)
- The Rogue's Disgraced Lady (2009)
- Lady Arabella's Scandalous Marriage (2010)

=== The Notorious St. Claires (Modern) ===
- Jordan St Claire: Dark and Dangerous (January 2011)
- The Reluctant Duke (February 2011)
- Taming the last St. Claire (March 2011)

=== The Copeland Sisters (Historical) ===
- The Lady Forfeits (November 2011)
- The Lady Gambles (December 2011)
- The Lady Confesses (January 2012)

=== Lyonedes Cousin ===
- Defying Drakon (May 2012)
- His Reputation Precedes Him (August 2012)

=== Alpha ===
- Christmas Alpha (November 2014)
- Dark Alpha (January 2015)
- Shadow Alpha (March 2015)
- Midnight Alpha (May 2015)
- Renegade Alpha (July 2015)
- Warrior Alpha (October 2015)
- Rogue Alpha (December 2015)
- Savage Alpha (March 2016)

=== Collections ===
- Best of Carole Mortimer: Savage Interlude, Passionate Winter (1984)
- Best of Carole Mortimer: Tempestuous Flame, Tempted by Desire (1984)
- Carole Mortimer Duet (1994)
- The Collection (Seasonal Products) (1998)
- Secret Passion / The One and Only (2006)
- The Tycoon's Mistress (2008)

=== Omnibus in Collaboration ===
- Romance on Holiday (1983) (Starfire by Celia Scott / Chance Meetings by Vanessa James / Savage Pagan by Helen Bianchin / Hard to Get by Carole Mortimer)
- Sunsational (1991) (Fantasy by Emma Darcy / Rent-A-Bride by Emma Goldrick / You Owe Me by Penny Jordan / Lovers in the Afternoon by Carole Mortimer)
- Matched By Mistake (1996) (Passionate Protection by Penny Jordan / Hotline by Gina Wilkins / Forbidden Surrender by Carole Mortimer)
- Christmas Miracles (1996) (A Christmas Proposal by Betty Neels / Heavenly Angels by Carole Mortimer / A Daddy For Christmas by Rebecca Winters)
- Mr. Mom (1997) (Memories of the Past by Carole Mortimer / The Marriage Ticket by Sharon Brondos / Tell Me A Story by Dallas Schulze)
- Wedded Bliss (1999) (They're Wed Again by Penny Jordan / The Man She'll Marry by Carole Mortimer)
- Nearly Weds! (1999) (Making Sure of Sarah by Betty Neels / The Man She'll Marry by Carole Mortimer / They're Wed Again! by Penny Jordan)
- Making Babies (2001) (Simply Irresistible by Miranda Lee / After the Loving by Carole Mortimer / His Brother's Child by Lucy Gordon)
- Wed Again! (2001) (They're Wed Again! by Penny Jordan / Anne Mather / The Man She'll Marry by Carole Mortimer)
- Christmas Secrets (2002) (A Heavenly Christmas by Carole Mortimer / Christmas Passions by Catherine Spencer / A Seasonal Secret by Diana Hamilton)
- A Child for Christmas (2003) (Carole Mortimer / Rebecca Winters /Jennifer Taylor)
- In the Boss's Bed (2004) (Carole Mortimer / Seduced by the boss by Sharon Kendrick / Dating her boss by Liz Fielding)
- Mistress to a Millionaire (2004) (The Bellini Bride by Michelle Reid / A Marriage Proposal by Carole Mortimer)
- All in a Day (2005) (Carole Mortimer / Rebecca Winters / Jessica Hart)
- Boardroom to Bedroom (2005) (The Boss's Marriage Arrangement by Penny Jordan / His Darling Valentine by Carole Mortimer)
- Christmas Proposals (2006) (Carole Mortimer / Rebecca Winters / Marion Lennox)
- Blackmailed Brides (2006) (Kim Lawrence / Carole Mortimer / Kathryn Ross)
- The Innocence Collection (2007) (Innocent Bride by Penny Jordan / Innocent Desires by Carole Mortimer / Innocent Seduction by Kay Thorpe)
- Christmas Weddings (2007) (with Shirley Jump and Margaret McDonagh)
- Brides for Christmas (2007) (with Liz Fielding and Jessica Hart)
- Conveniently Wed (2008) (with Melissa James and Rebecca Winters)
- His Bride on His Terms (2008) (with Jacqueline Baird and Sara Craven)
- Their Christmas Vows / His Christmas Eve Proposal / Snowbound Bride (2008) (with Shirley Jump and Margaret McDonagh)
- Taken by the Boss (2009) (with Leigh Michaels and Cathy Williams)
- Christmas with the Boss (2009) (with Natalie Anderson and Alison Roberts)
