= Hills of Home =

Hills of Home may refer to:

- Hills of Home (film), a 1948 movie in the Lassie series
- "Hills of Home", a song by Hazel Dickens
  - Hills of Home: 25 Years of Folk Music on Rounder Records, a compilation album by Dickens
- Hills of Home, a 1977 novel by Helen Bianchin
- "The Hills of Home", a Beverly Hillbillies episode
