= Julie James =

Julie James may refer to:

- Julie James (politician) (born 1958), Welsh Labour politician
- Julie James (I Know What You Did Last Summer), a character in the franchise
- Julie Doyle (soccer, born 1996), née James, American soccer player

== See also ==
- Julia James (1890–1964), English actress
