= Kathryn Ross (writer) =

British writer of over 30 romance novels (born 1966)

- Born: 1966 (age 59–60)
- Occupation: Novelist
- Writing career
- Period: 1989-present
- Genre: Romance

Kathryn Ross (born 1966 in Africa) is a British writer of over 30 romance novels. Her books have been translated into English, Spanish, French, Dutch, Portuguese, Italian Modern Greek, Japanese, Swedish, Finnish, Afrikaans, Polish, Arabic, Danish, German, Hebrew, Korean, Turkish, Norwegian, and Thai.

Ross lives in Lancashire, England. She is married and has two stepsons.

== Bibliography ==
=== Single novels ===
- Designed with Love (1989)
- No Regrets (1990)
- Playing by the Rules (1991)
- By Love Alone (1992)
- Total Possession (1993)
- Divided by Love (1994)
- Scent of Betrayal (1994)
- Whisper of Scandal (1994)
- Ruthless Contract (1995)
- Seduced by the Enemy (1996)
- The Boss's Mistress (1998)
- A Marriage on Paper (1999)
- Terms of Engagement (1999)
- The Unmarried Father (2000)
- Bride by Deception (2000)
- The Eleventh Hour Groom (2001)
- The Night of the Wedding (2001)
- The Millionaire's Agenda (2002)
- Her Determined Husband (2002)
- The Secret Child (2002)
- Blackmailed by the Boss (2003)
- The Italian Marriage (2003)
- A Spanish Engagement (2003)
- A Latin Passion (2004)
- The Frenchman's Mistress (2004)
- The Millionaire's Secret Mistress (2005)
- Mistress to a Rich Man (2005)
- Taken by the Tycoon (2006)
- Mediterranean Boss, Convenient Mistress (2007)
- The Greek Tycoon's Innocent Mistress (2007)

=== Expecting! series multi-author ===
- The Unexpected Father (1996)

=== Nanny Wanted series multi-author ===
- The Love-Child (1997)

=== Big Event series multi-author ===
- Bride for a Year (1998)

=== Omnibus in collaboration ===
- Blackmailed Brides (2006) (with Kim Lawrence and Carole Mortimer)
- Latin Affairs (2006) (with Helen Bianchin and Sharon Kendrick)
- Convenient Weddings (2006) (with Jacqueline Baird and Helen Bianchin)
