= Margaret Way =

Australian novelist (1935–2022)

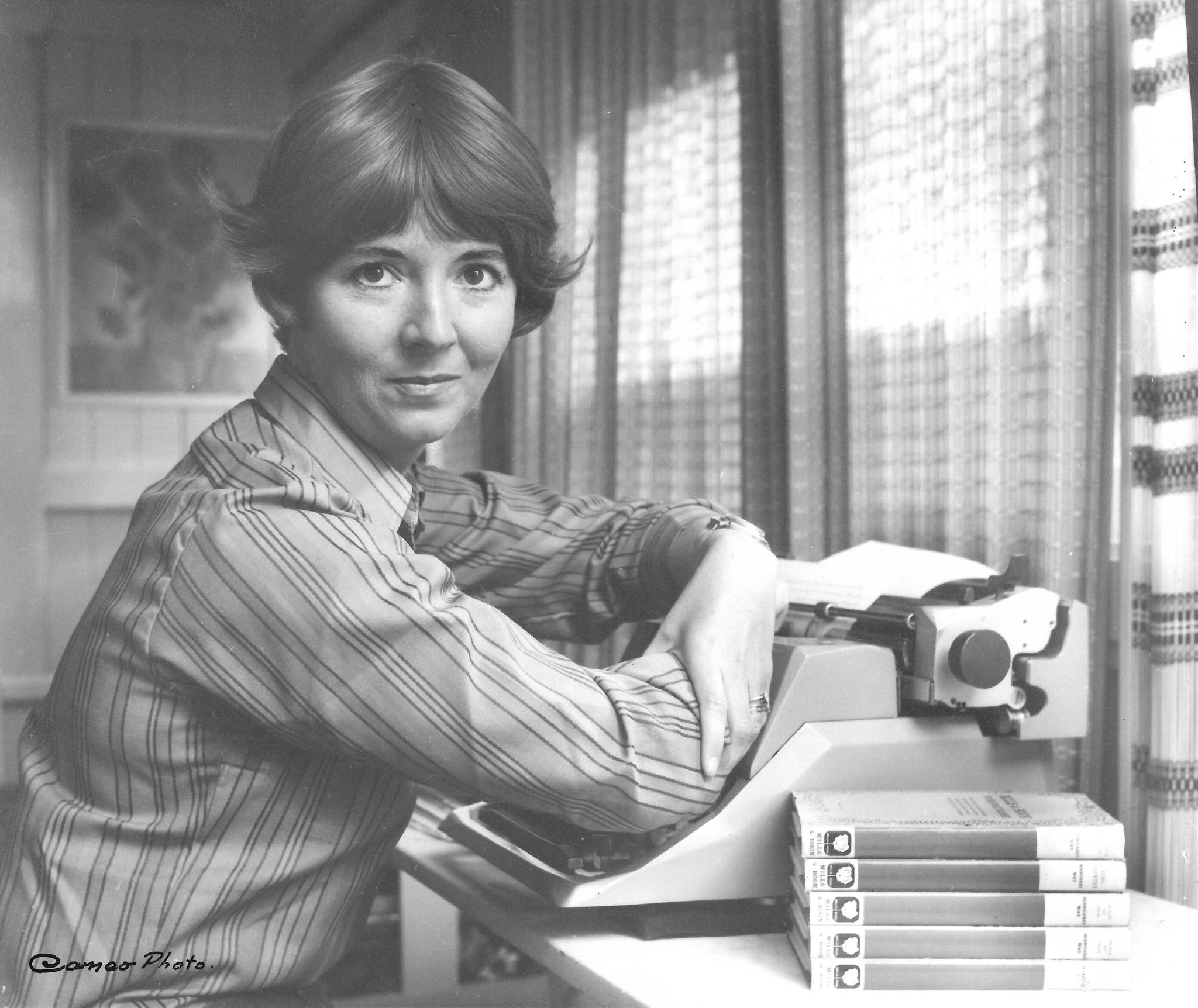
- Born: 7 August 1935; Brisbane, Australia
- Died: 10 August 2022 (aged 87); Cleveland, Queensland, Australia
- Occupations: Pianist, teacher, vocal coach, accompanist, novelist
- Spouse: Alan Way
- Children: Laurence Way (deceased)
- Writing career
- Period: 1970–2013
- Genre: Romance

Margaret Way (7 August 1935 in Brisbane – 10 August 2022 in Cleveland, Queensland, Australia) was an Australian writer of romance novels and women's fiction. A prolific author, Way wrote more than 120 novels since 1970, many through Mills & Boon, a romance imprint of British publisher Harlequin UK Ltd., owned by Harlequin Enterprises.

== Biography ==
Before her marriage, she was a well-known pianist, teacher, vocal coach and accompanist. She began writing when her son, Laurence Way, was born, a friend took a pile of Mills & Boon books to her, she read all and decided that she also could write these types of novels. She began to write and promote her country with her stories set in Australia. She sold her first novels in 1970. Margaret Way lived with her family in her native Brisbane. Beginning in 2013, Margaret began to self-publish, releasing her first "e-book" mid-July.

Margaret died on 10 August 2022 in Cleveland, Queensland.

== Bibliography ==
=== Single Novels ===
- King Country (1970)
- Blaze of Silk (1970)
- The Time of the Jacaranda (1970)
- Bauhinia Junction (1971)
- Man from Bahl Bahla (1971)
- Summer Magic (1971)
- Return to Belle Amber (1971)
- Ring of Jade (1972)
- Copper Moon (1972)
- Rainbow Bird (1972)
- Man Like Daintree (1972)
- Noonfire (1972)
- Storm Over Mandargi (1973)
- Wind River (1973)
- Love Theme (1974)
- McCabe's Kingdom (1974)
- Sweet Sundown (1974)
- Reeds of Honey (1975)
- Storm Flower (1975)
- Lesson in Loving (1975)
- Flight into Yesterday (1976)
- Red Cliffs of Malpara (1976)
- Man on Half-moon (1976)
- Swan's Reach (1976)
- Mutiny in Paradise (1977)
- One Way Ticket (1977)
- Portrait of Jaime (1977)
- Black Ingo (1977)
- Awakening Flame (1978)
- Wild Swan (1978)
- Ring of Fire (1978)
- Wake the Sleeping Tiger (1978)
- Valley of the Moon (1979)
- White Magnolia (1979)
- Winds of Heaven (1979)
- Blue Lotus (1979)
- Butterfly and the Baron (1979)
- Golden Puma (1980)
- Temple of Fire (1980)
- Lord of the High Valley (1980)
- Flamingo Park (1980)
- North of Capricorn (1981)
- Season for Change (1981)
- Shadow Dance (1981)
- McIvor Affair (1981)
- Home to Morning Star (1981)
- Broken Rhapsody (1982)
- The Silver Veil (1982)
- Spellbound (1982)
- Hunter's Moon (1982)
- Girl at Cobalt Creek (1983)
- No Alternative (1983)
- House of Memories (1983)
- Almost a Stranger (1984)
- A place called Rambulara (1984)
- Fallen Idol (1984)
- Hunt the Sun (1985)
- Eagle's Ridge (1985)
- The Tiger's Cage (1986)
- Innocent in Eden (1986)
- Diamond Valley (1986)
- Morning Glory (1988)
- Devil Moon (1988)
- Mowana Magic (1988)
- Hungry Heart (1988)
- Rise of an Eagle (1988)
- One Fateful Summer (1993)
- The Carradine Brand (1994)
- Holding on to Alex (1997)
- The Australian Heiress (1997)
- Claiming His Child (1999)
- The Cattleman's Bride (2000)
- The Cattle Baron (2001)
- The Husbands of the Outback (2001)
- Secrets of the Outback (2002)
- With This Ring (2003)
- Innocent Mistress (2004)
- Cattle Rancher, Convenient Wife (2007)
- Outback Marriages (2007)
- Promoted: Nanny to Wife (2007)
- Cattle Rancher, Secret Son (2007)
- Genni's Dilemma (2008)
- Bride At Briar Ridge (2009)
- Outback Heiress, Surprise Proposal (2009)
- Cattle Baron, Nanny Needed (2009)

=== Legends of the Outback Series ===
1. Mail Order Marriage (1999)
2. The Bridesmaid's Wedding (2000)
3. The English Bride (2000)
4. A Wife at Kimbara (2000)

=== Koomera Crossing Series ===
1. Sarah's Baby (2003)
2. Runaway Wife (2003)
3. Outback Bridegroom (2003)
4. Outback Surrender (2003)
5. Home to Eden (2004)

=== McIvor Sisters Series ===
1. The Outback Engagement (2005)
2. Marriage at Murraree (2005)

=== Men Of The Outback Series ===
1. The Cattleman (2006)
2. The Cattle Baron's Bride (2006)
3. Her Outback Protector (2006)
4. The Horseman (2006)

=== Outback Marriages Series ===
1. Outback Man Seeks Wife (2007)
2. Cattle Rancher, Convenient Wife (2007)

=== Barons of the Outback Series Multi-Author ===
1. Wedding At Wangaree Valley (2008)
2. Bride At Briar's Ridge (2008)

=== Family Ties Multi-Author ===
- Once Burned (1995)

=== Hitched! Multi-Author ===
- A Faulkner Possession (1996)

=== Simply the Best Multi-Author ===
- Georgia and the Tycoon (1997)

=== The Big Event Multi-Author ===
- Beresford's Bride (1998)

=== Guardian Angels Multi-Author ===
- Gabriel's Mission (1998)

=== Australians Series Multi-Author ===
7. Her Outback Man (1998)
17. Master of Maramba (2001)
19. Outback Fire (2001)
22. Mistaken Mistress (2002)
24. Outback Angel (2002)
33. The Australian Tycoon's Proposal (2004)
35. His Heiress Wife (2004)

=== Marrying the Boss Series Multi-Author ===
- Boardroom Proposal (1999)

=== Contract Brides Series Multi-Author ===
- Strategy for Marriage (2002)

=== Everlasting Love Series Multi-Author ===
- Hidden Legacy (2008)

=== Diamond Brides Series Multi-Author ===
- The Australian's Society Bride (2008)

=== Collections ===
- Summer Magic / Ring of Jade / Noonfire (1981)
- Wife at Kimbara / Bridesmaid's Wedding (2005)

=== Omnibus in Collaboration ===
- Pretty Witch / Without Any Amazement / Storm Over Mandargi (1977) (with Lucy Gillen and Margaret Malcolm)
- Dear Caliban / Heart of the Eagle / Swans' Reach (1978) (with Jane Donnelly and Elizabeth Graham)
- The Bonds of Matrimony / Dragon Island / Reeds of Honey (1979) (with Elizabeth Hunter and Henrietta Reid)
- The Man Outside / Castles in Spain / McCabe's Kingdom (1979) (with Jane Donnelly and Rebecca Stratton)
- Winds From The Sea / Island of Darkness / Wind River (1979) (with Margaret Pargeter and Rebecca Stratton)
- Moorland Magic / Tree of Idleness / Sweet Sundown (1980) (with Elizabeth Ashton and Elizabeth Hunter)
- The Shifting Sands / Portrait of Jaime / Touched by Fire (1982) (with Jane Donnelly and Kay Thorpe)
- Head of Chancery / Wild Heart / One-Way Ticket (1986) (with Betty Beaty and Doris Smith)
- Heart of the Scorpion / The Winds of Heaven / Sweet Compulsion (1987) (with Janice Gray and Victoria Woolf)
- One Brief Sweet Hour / Once More With Feeling / Blue Lotus (1990) (with Jane Arbor and Natalie Sparks)
- Marry Me Cowboy (1995) (with Janet Dailey, Susan Fox and Anne McAllister)
- Husbands on Horseback (1996) (with Diana Palmer)
- Wedlocked (1999) (with Day Leclaire and Anne McAllister)
- Mistletoe Magic (1999) (with Betty Neels and Rebecca Winters)
- The Australians (2000) (with Helen Bianchin and Miranda Lee)
- Weddings Down Under (2001) (with Helen Bianchin and Jessica Hart)
- Outback Husbands (2002) (with Marion Lennox)
- The Mother's Day Collection (2002) (with Helen Dickson and Kate Hoffmann)
- Australian Nights (2003) (with Miranda Lee)
- Outback Weddings (2003) (with Barbara Hannay)
- Australian Playboys (2003) (with Helen Bianchin and Marion Lennox)
- Australian Tycoons (2004) (with Emma Darcy and Marion Lennox)
- A Mother's Day Gift (2004) (with Anne Ashley and Lucy Monroe)
- White Wedding (2004) (with Judy Christenberry and Jessica Steele)
- A Christmas Engagement (2004) (with Sara Craven and Jessica Matthews)
- A Very Special Mother's Day (2005) (with Anne Herries)
- All I Want for Christmas... (2005) (with Betty Neels and Jessica Steele)
- The Mills and Boon Collection (2006) (with Caroline Anderson and Penny Jordan)
- Outback Desire (2006) (with Emma Darcy and Carol Marinelli)
- To Mum, with Love (2006) (with Rebecca Winters)
- Australian Heroes (2007) (with Marion Lennox and Fiona McArthur)
- Tall, Dark and Sexy (2008) (with Caroline Anderson and Helen Bianchin)
- The Boss's Proposal (2008) (with Jessica Steele and Patricia Thayer)
- Island Heat / Outback Man Seeks Wife / Prince's Forbidden Virgin / One Night Before Marriage / Their Lost-and-found Family / Single Dad's Marriage Wish (2008) (with Robyn Donald, Marion Lennox, Carol Marinelli, Sarah Mayberry and Anne Oliver)
- Australian Billionaires (2009) (with Jennie Adams and Amy Andrews)
- Cattle Baron : Nanny Needed / Bachelor Dad on Her Doorstep (2009) (with Michelle Douglas)
