= Miranda Lee =

Australian writer (1945–2021)

- Born: Maureen Mary; 1945; Port Macquarie, New South Wales, Australia
- Died: 13 November 2021 (aged 75–76)
- Occupation: Novelist
- Spouse: Anthony Ernest "Tony" Lee
- Children: 3
- Writing career
- Pen name: Miranda Lee
- Period: 1990–2013
- Genre: Romantic novel

Miranda Lee (née Maureen Mary, b. 1945 in Port Macquarie, New South Wales, Australia, d. 13 November 2021) was an Australian writer of over 75 romance novels. She published her novels through Mills & Boon, beginning in 1990.

== Biography ==
Miranda Lee was born in Port Macquarie, New South Wales, Australia.

She was the daughter of a school teacher and a dressmaker, and the youngest of four children.

She worked as programmer until her marriage, they had three daughters. In 1990, she published her first novels with Mills & Boon.

She was the sister of Emma Darcy (Wendy Brennan).

She died on 13 November 2021, aged 76.

== Bibliography ==
=== Single Novels ===
- After the Affair (1990)
- An Obsessive Desire (1990)
- The Reluctant Lover (1991)
- Scandalous Seduction (1991)
- Asking for Trouble (1991)
- A Daring Proposition (1992)
- A Date with Destiny (1992)
- Knight to the Rescue (1992)
- Beth and the Barbarian (1993)
- A Very Secret Affair (1995)
- A Haunting Obsession (1995)
- Rendezvous with Revenge (1996)
- Night of Shame (1997)
- Two-Week Wife (1997)
- Just for a Night (1998)
- Wedding Games (1998)
- Sole Paternity (1999)
- The Blackmailed Bridegroom (1999)
- Marriage in Peril (2000)
- Just a Little Sex... (2001)
- A Man for the Night (2002)
- The Guardian's Forbidden Mistress (2008)
- A Night, a Secret... a Child (2010)

=== Carstairs Series ===
1. Outback Man (1991)
2. Mistress of Deception (1993)

=== Powers – Slater Studio Series ===
1. A Daughter's Dilemma (1992)
2. Maddie's Love Child (1996)

=== Hearts of Fire -OR- Secrets & Sins Series ===
1. Desire & Deception (1994)
2. Fantasies & the Future (1994)
3. Passion & the Past (1994)
4. Scandals & Secrets (1994)
5. Seduction & Sacrifice (1994)
6. Marriage & Miracles (1994) aka Marriages & Miracles
7. Hearts of Fire (1994)
- Hearts of Fire (omnibus) (2002)
- Secrets and Sins (omnibus) (2002)
- Fortune and Fate (omnibus) (2003)

=== Affairs To Remember Series ===
1. A Kiss to Remember (1995)
2. A Weekend to Remember (1996)
3. A Woman to Remember (1996)
- Red-hot Australians (omnibus) (2004)

=== The Australian Playboys Series ===
1. The Playboy in Pursuit (2000)
2. The Playboy's Proposition (2000)
3. The Playboy's Virgin (2000)

=== Secret Passions Series ===
1. A Secret Vengeance (2001)
2. The Secret Love-Child (2002)
3. At Her Boss's Bidding (2002)

=== Three Rich Men Series ===
1. A Rich Man's Revenge (2003)
2. Mistress for a Month (2003)
3. Sold to the Sheikh (2003)
- Billionaire Bachelors (Omnibus) (2007)

=== Wives Wanted! Series ===
1. Bought: One Bride (2005)
2. The Tycoon's Trophy Wife (2005)
3. A Scandalous Marriage (2005)
- Bought by the Tycoon (omnibus) (2009)

=== Year Down Under Series Multi-Author ===
- Outback Man (1991)

=== Forbidden! Series Multi-Author ===
- A Daughter's Dilemma (1992)

=== Pages & Privileges Series Multi-Author ===
- An Outrageous Proposal (1992)
- Fantasies & the Future (1994)
- Passion & the Past (1994)

=== Secrets Series Multi-Author ===
- Marriage in Jeopardy (1993)

=== The Australians Series Multi-Author ===
2.Heart-throb for Hire (1993)
12. Simply Irresistible (1993)
14. Marriage at a Price (2001)
18. Fugitive Bride (1998)
23. The Virgin Bride (1999)
32. The Passion Price (2004)

=== Wedlocked! Series Multi-Author ===
- The Bride in Blue (1995)
- His Bride for One Night (2005)

=== Foreign Affairs Series Multi-Author ===
- The Bride in Blue (1995)
- Australian Attraction: The Bride in Blue / Marriage Campaign (omnibus) (2002) (with Helen Bianchin)

=== Passion Series Multi-Author ===
- Aunt Lucy's Lover (1996)
- The Millionaire's Mistress (1998)
- The Seduction Project (1998)

=== Scandals! Series Multi-Author ===
- Red-Hot and Reckless (1997)

=== Nanny Wanted Series Multi-Author ===
- A Nanny Named Nick (1997)

=== Expecting! Series Multi-Author ===
- The Boss's Baby (1998)

=== Society Weddings Series Multi-Author ===
- The Wedding-Night Affair (1999)

=== His Baby Series Multi-Author ===
- Facing Up to Fatherhood (1999)

=== In Love With Her Boss Series Multi-Author ===
7. Bedded by the Boss (2004)

=== Nine to Five Series Multi-Author ===
- Bedded by the Boss (2004)

=== Mistress to a Millionaire Series Multi-Author ===
- The Magnate's Mistress (2004)

=== Uncut Series Multi-Author ===
- Love-Slave to the Sheikh (2006)

=== Ruthless! Series Multi-Author ===
- The Billionaire Boss's Forbidden Mistress (2006)
- Pleasured in the Billionaire's Bed (2006)
- The Ruthless Marriage Proposal (2007)
- The Millionaire's Inexperienced Love-Slave (2008)

=== Bedded By Blackmail Series Multi-Author ===
- Blackmailed into the Italian's Bed (2007)

=== Collections ===
- Yours, Mine and Ours (1998)
- Blind Passions (1999)
- Australian Playboy Tycoons (2006)
- Seduction Project / Millionaire's Mistress (2008)

=== Omnibus in Collaboration ===
- Nine Months: Forbidden Fruit, Simply Irresistible (1996) (with Charlotte Lamb)
- Breaking / Making Up (1997) (with Susan Napier)
- Verdict, Matrimony (1997) (with Ann Charlton)
- Passion (1999) (with Susan Napier and Michelle Reid)
- The Australians (2000) (with Helen Bianchin and Margaret Way)
- Seduction Guaranteed (2000) (with Anne Mather and Michelle Reid)
- Husbands and Wives (2000) (with Diana Hamilton and Michelle Reid)
- Switched at the Altar (2001) (with Leigh Michaels, Susan Napier and Rebecca Winters)
- Making Babies (2001) (with Lucy Gordon and Carole Mortimer)
- Stranded in Paradise (2001) (with Jacqueline Baird and Liz Fielding)
- Terms of Engagement (2002) (with Kate Hoffmann)
- An Australian Christmas (2002) (with Lindsay Armstrong and Emma Darcy)
- Australian Nights (2003) (with Margaret Way)
- Summer Brides (2003) (with Liz Fielding and Susan Fox)
- Marriage at His Convenience (2003) (with Susan Fox and Diana Hamilton)
- Sold to the Sheikh / Reinventing Julia (2004) (with Muriel Jensen)
- His Secret Baby (2004) (with Robyn Donald and Kate Walker)
- Hot Summer Loving (2004) (with Jacqueline Baird and Sandra Field)
- A Marriage on Paper (2005) (with Jane Porter and Catherine Spencer)
- Virgin Brides (2005) (with Sharon Kendrick and Kate Walker)
- Secrets and Sins... Revealed! / From Lust to Love (2005) (with Cathy Williams)
- Love in the City (2005) (with Anne McAllister and Cathy Williams)
- Her Royal Baby / Passion Price (2005) (with Marion Lennox)
- Plain Jane Makeover (2005) (with Penny Jordan and Barbara McMahon)
- The Passion Collection (2005) (with Emily McKay and Emilie Rose)
- Christmas with a Hero (2006) (with Merline Lovelace and Catherine Mann)
- Sinful Secrets (2007) (with Catherine George and Sara Wood)
- Her Secret Child (2008) (with Sharon Kendrick and Cathy Williams)
- Magnate's Mistress / Married to the Enemy / Woman of Spirit (2008) (with Lucy Gordon and Ann Major)
- In the Australian's Bed (2008) (with Lindsay Armstrong and Melanie Milburne)
- One Passionate Night (2008) (with Robyn Donald and Sandra Field)
- Ruthless (2009) (with Helen Bianchin and Emma Darcy)
- Love-Slave to the Sheikh / Traded to the Sheikh / At the Sheikh's Command (2009) (with Emma Darcy and Kate Walker)
- Blackmailed Bridegroom / Duarte's Child (2009) (with Lynne Graham)

== Awards ==
Lee was a five-time finalist for the Romance Writers of Australia, Romantic Book of the Year Award:

- A Nanny Named Nick in 1999
- The Boss's Baby in 2000
- The Blackmailed Bridegroom in 2001
- The Passion Price in 2005
- The Millionaire's Inexperienced Love-Slave in 2009
