= Caroline Anderson (writer) =

British writer

- Born: British Hong Kong
- Occupation: Novelist
- Writing career
- Pen name: Caroline Anderson
- Period: 1991 - present
- Genre: Romantic novel

Caroline Anderson is the pseudonym by Caroline M. Woolnough (born British Hong Kong) is a popular British writer of over 80 contemporary romance novels to Mills & Boon (or Harlequin Enterprises Ltd) since 1991. She specializes in medical romances. Before writing, she has been a nurse, a secretary, a teacher, and had run her own business. Married with John, they had two sisters: Sarah and Hannah, and lived in Suffolk, England.

== Bibliography ==
=== Single Novels ===
- Practice Makes Perfect, 1991/12
- Saving Dr. Gregory, 1992/04
- A Gentle Giant, 1992/06
- Just What the Doctor Ordered, 1993/05
- Picking Up the Pieces, 1994/02
- Once More, With Feeling, 1994/12
- Role Play, 1995/02
- Taken For Granted, 1995/05
- A Familiar Stranger, 1995/08
- One Step at a Time, 1996/01
- The Teapot Trail: A Taste of Cumbria, 1996/01
- Just Another Miracle!, 1998/02
- That Forever Feeling, 1998/02
- A Funny Thing Happened..., 1999/01
- Kids Included!, 1999/06
- Practically Perfect, 1999/10
- Just Say Yes!, 2000/04
- Making Memories, 2000/06
- Give Me Forever, 2000/12
- Rescuing Dr. Ryan, 2001/02
- A Special Kind of Woman, 2001/08
- A Very Single Woman, 2002/04
- An unexpected Bonus, 2003/10
- For Christmas, For Always, 2003/10
- A Special Kind of Woman, 2008
- Their Christmas Family Miracle, 2009

=== The Audley Memorial Hospital Series ===
1. Relative Ethics, 1991/11
2. More than Time, 1992/06
3. A Perfect Hero, 1992/08
4. Playing the Joker, 1992/12
5. Raw Deal, 1993/01
6. Knave of Hearts, 1993/02
7. Second Thoughts, 1993/10
8. The Spice of Life, 1993/10
9. A Man of honour, 1994/03
10. Anyone Can Dream, 1994/12
11. Love Without Measure, 1995/07
12. That's My Baby!, 1995/12
13. And Daughter Makes Three, 1996/01
14. Tender Touch, 1996/05
15. The Real Fantasy, 1996/08
16. The Ideal Choice, 1996/09
17. If You Need Me..., 1997/02
18. Not Husband Material!, 1997/04
19. The Perfect Wife and Mother?, 1997/05
20. Definitely Maybe, 1998/06
21. Sarah's Gift, 1999/01
22. The Girl Next Door, 2000/03
23. Just a Family Doctor, 2000/10
24. A Mother by Nature, 2000/12
25. Accidental Rendezvous, 2001/07
26. The Perfect Christmas, 2001/10
27. Accidental Seduction, 2002/06
28. The Baby Bonding, 2003/08
29. Assignment: Christmas, 2004/10
30. Holding Out for a Hero, 2005/06
31. Maternal Instinct, 2006/04
32. A Wife and Child to Cherish, 2006/12
33. His Very Own Wife and Child, 2007/02
34. A Mummy for Christmas = A Mommy for Christmas, 2008/10

=== Assignment: Double Destiny ===
1. Double Destiny, 2002/09
2. Assignment: Single Man, 2002/09
3. Assignment: Single Father, 2002/10

=== Yoxburgh Series ===
1. The Tycoon's Instant Family, 2006/09
2. Caring for His Baby, 2007/09
3. His Pregnant Housekeeper, 2008/03
4. The Single Mum And The Tycoon = The Single Mom And The Tycoon, 2008/10

=== Kids & Kisses Series Multi-Author ===
- Love Without Measure, 1995/07
- The Ideal Choice, 1996/09

=== Christmas is for Kids Series Multi-Author ===
- A Very Special Need, 1997/10

=== Changing Places Series Multi-Author ===
- Captive Heart, 1998/08

=== Bundles of Joy Series Multi-Author ===
- An Unexpected Bonus, 1999/04

=== Ready for Baby Series Multi-Author ===
- Delivered: One Family, 2000/09
- The Pregnant Tycoon, 2004/03
- The Baby From Nowhere = The Pregnancy Surprise, 2004/07
- A pregnancy Surprise, 2004/12

=== St Elizabeth's Children's Hospital Series Multi-Author ===
12. Angel's Christmas, 2001/04

=== Nearlyweds Series Multi-Author ===
- The Impetuous Bride, 2001/04

=== Maybe Baby! Series Multi-Author ===
- The Baby Question, 2002/01

=== What Women Want! Series Multi-Author ===
- With This Baby..., 2003/05

=== Heartbeat Series Multi-Author ===
- Chemical Reaction, 2003/08

=== Tango Series Multi-Author ===
- The Baby Bonding, 2003/08

=== Heart to Heart Series Multi-Author ===
- A Bride Worth Waiting For, 2005/11

=== Baby On Board Series Multi-Author ===
- The Tycoon's Instant Family, 2006
- His Pregnant Housekeeper, 2008

=== Heart to Heart Multi-Author ===
- Caring for His Baby, 2007/09

=== Brides of Penhally Bay Series Multi-Author ===
- Christmas-Eve Baby, 2007
- The Rebel of Penhally Bay, 2009

=== Diamond Brides Series Multi-Author ===
- Two Little Miracles, 2008

=== Brides of Penhally Bay Multi-Author ===
- Their Miracle Baby, 2008

=== Billionaire Doctors Multi-Author ===
- The Valtieri Marriage Deal, 2009

=== Omnibus In Collaboration ===
- Marrying a Doctor (2001) (Betty Neels)
- Prescription Pregnancy (2001) (Marion Lennox and Josie Metcalfe)
- Island Pleasures (2002/04) (Susan Napier)
- Live the Emotion (2003/07) (Adrianne Lee and Julia Byrne)
- The Pregnancy Surprise (2003) (Emma Darcy and Gayle Wilson)
- Angel's Christmas by Anderson with Nice and Easy by (Josie Metcalfe (2004)
- Christmas Deliveries (2004) (Josie Metcalfe and Sarah Morgan)
- It Takes a Hero (2005/08) (Carol Marinelli with Sarah Morgan)
- The Mills and Boon Collection (2006) (Penny Jordan with Margaret Way)
- Christmas Treasures (2006) (Betty Neels and Helen Brooks)
- Whose Baby? (2007) (Lucy Gordon and Jessica Hart)

== References and sources ==
- Caroline Anderson at eHarlequin
