= Lucy Gordon (writer) =

British writer

Christine Sparks Fiorotto
- Born: Christine Sparks; 20 September 1942; England
- Died: 10 May 2026 (aged 83)
- Occupation: Novelist
- Writing career
- Pen name: Lucy Gordon; Penelope Stratton
- Genre: Romance
- Notable works: Song of the Lorelei, His Brother's Child
- Notable awards: RITA award – Traditional Romance; 1991 Song of the Lorelei; RITA award – Traditional Romance; 1998 His Brother's Child

Lucy Gordon is a pseudonym used by Christine Sparks Fiorotto, a popular British writer of more than 75 romance novels. She began working on a British women's magazine, but since 1984 she has published her romance novels with Silhouette Books and Mills & Boon (or Harlequin Enterprises in the USA). She is a two time winner of the Romance Writers of America RITA Award.

== Biography ==
Christine Sparks was born in England, Great Britain. Since 1984, Sparks has published novels under the pseudonym Lucy Gordon, and also Penelope Stratton. She has also published under her own name.

Sparks was married to a Venetian artist and they lived in different parts of Italy, though they resided for latter part of their lives in Northamptonshire. She died in 2026 following a lengthy illness.

== Bibliography ==
=== Single novels ===
- Legacy of Fire (1984)
- The Judgment of Paris (1984)
- Enchantment in Venice (1985)
- Island of Dreams (1985)
- Cold Hearted Man (1985)
- Take All Myself (1985)
- Virtue and Vice (1985)
- My Only Love, My Only Hate (1986)
- Once upon a Time (1986)
- Golden Boy (1987)
- A Pearl Beyond Price (1987)
- A Fragile Beauty (1987)
- Just Good Friends (1987)
- Eagle's Prey (1987)
- A Night of Passion (1988)
- A Woman of Spirit (1988)
- For Love Alone (1988)
- Bought Woman (1989)
- Convicted of Love (1989)
- Vengeance is Mine (1989)
- A True Marriage (1989)
- Song of the Lorelei (1990)
- The Sicilian (1991)
- On His Honor (1991)
- Outcast Woman (1992)
- Heaven and Earth (1992)
- Married in Haste (1993)
- Instant Father (1993)
- Royal Harlot (1994)
- Uncaged (1994)
- Seduced by Innocence (1994)
- Two-faced Woman (1995)
- This Man and This Woman (1995)
- For the Love of Emma (1996)
- Rebel in Disguise (1996)
- This Is My Child (1996)
- His Brother's Child (1997)
- Beauty and the Boss (1997)
- Forgotten Fiancee (1998)
- The Diamond Dad (1998)
- Be My Girl (1998)
- Anything, Any Time, Any Place (1999)
- Farelli's Wife (1999)
- Tycoon for Hire (1999)
- Rico's Secret Child (1999)
- Taming Jason (1999)
- For the Sake of His Child (2000)
- The Sheikh's Reward (2000)
- For His Little Girl (2000)
- The Stand-In Bride (2001)
- A Convenient Wedding (2002)
- Princess Dottie (2002)
- His Pretend Wife (2002)
- The Monte Carlo Proposal (2004)
- The Italian's Rightful Bride (2005)
- Married Under the Italian Sun (2006)
- Italians Wife By Sunset (2007)
- The Mediterranean Rebel's Bride (2007)
- One Summer in Italy... (2007)
- The Italian's Passionate Revenge (2008)
- The Italian's Cinderella Bride (2008)

=== Italian Grooms series ===
1. Wife by Arrangement (2001)
2. Husband by Necessity (2001)
3. Bride by Choice (2001)

=== The Counts of Calvani series ===
1. The Venetian Playboy's Bride (2003)
2. The Italian Millionaire's Marriage (2003)
3. The Tuscan Tycoon's Wife (2003)
4. Wedding in Venice (2003)
- The Counts of Calvani (Omnibus) (2006)

=== Farnese Brothers series ===
1. Rinaldo's Inherited Bride (2004)
2. Gino's Arranged Bride (2004)

=== Rinucci Brothers series ===
1. Wife and Mother Forever (2005)
2. Her Italian Boss's Agenda (2005)
3. The Wedding Arrangement (2006)
4. The Italian's Wife By Sunset (2007)
5. The Mediterranean Rebel's Bride (2007)
6. The Millionaire Tycoon's English Rose (2007)

=== Simply The Best series ===
- Daniel and Daughter (1997)

=== Maybe Baby series ===
- The Pregnancy Bond (2002)

=== Ready for Baby series multi-author ===
- The Italian's Baby (2003)

=== Heart to Heart series multi-author ===
- A Family for Keeps (2005)

=== Collections ===
- Kids and Kisses (2000)

=== Omnibus in collaboration ===
- Blood Brothers (2000) (with Anne McAllister)
- Latin Lovers (2000) (with Lynne Graham and Penny Jordan)
- Christmas with a Latin Lover (2001) (with Lynne Graham and Penny Jordan)
- Making Babies (2001) (with Miranda Lee and Carole Mortimer)
- Maybe Baby! (2002) (with Diana Hamilton and Susan Napier)
- His Majesty's Marriage (2002) (with Rebecca Winters) (The Prince's Choice / The King's Bride)
- Mediterranean Millionaires (2003) (with Lynne Graham and Michelle Reid)
- Coming Home for Christmas (2003) (with Helen Bianchin and Rebecca Winters)
- Coming Home (2004) (with Helen Bianchin and Rebecca Winters)
- Claiming His Mistress (2004) (with Helen Bianchin and Sharon Kendrick)
- A Convenient Proposal (2004) (with Helen Bianchin and Kate Walker)
- Desert Princes (2007) (with Michelle Reid and Alexandra Sellers)
- Whose Baby? (2007) (with Caroline Anderson and Jessica Hart)

== Awards ==
- 1991 – Romance Writers of America RITA Award, Traditional Romance – Song of the Lorelei
- 1998 – Romance Writers of America RITA Award, Traditional Romance – His Brother's Child
