= Liz Fielding =

British writer

- Born: Berkshire, England, UK
- Occupation: novelist
- Spouse: John
- Children: 2
- Writing career
- Language: English
- Period: 1992–present
- Genre: Romantic novel
- Notable works: The Best Man & The Bridesmaid, The Marriage Miracle
- Notable awards: RITA award – Traditional Romance; 2001 The Best Man & The Bridesmaid; RITA award – Short Contemporary Romance; 2006 The Marriage Miracle
- Website: lizfielding.com

Liz Fielding (born in Berkshire, England) is a British writer of over 60 romance novels published by Mills & Boon since 1992. She has won two RITA Awards.

== Biography ==
Liz Fielding was born in Berkshire, England, UK. She was educated at a girls' Convent School in Maidenhead. At 20, she went to Lusaka, Zambia, to work as a secretary. There she met her husband, John, a civil engineer, following him to Bahrain, Kenya and Botswana. They now live in a small village in Carmarthenshire, Wales. She has two adult children . In 1992, her first book was published — An Image of You, set in Kenya. Since then, she has continued publishing her contemporary romance novels.

== Bibliography ==
=== Single Novels ===
- An Image of You (1992)
- A Point of Pride (1993)
- Instant Fire (1993)
- Old Desires (1994)
- A Stranger's Kiss (1994)
- Dangerous Flirtation (1994)
- Bittersweet Deception (1995)
- Prisoner of the Heart (1995)
- Conflict of Hearts (1996)
- All She Wants for Christmas (1996)
- The Bride the Baby and the Best Man (1996)
- The Three Year Itch (1997)
- Eloping with Emmy (1998)
- Gentlemen Prefer... Brunettes (1998)
- And Mother Makes Three (1999)
- The Baby Plan (1999)
- Dating Her Boss (1999)
- His Desert Rose (2000)
- The Best Man and the Bridesmaid (2000)
- Her Ideal Husband (2000)
- His Runaway Bride (2001)
- The Bachelor's Baby (2001)
- His Personal Agenda (2001)
- Baby on Loan (2002)
- City Girl in Training (2002)
- The Billionaire Takes a Bride (2003)
- A Surprise Christmas Proposal (2003)
- A Family of His Own (2004)
- A Wife on Paper (2004)
- Her Wish-List Bridegroom (2004)
- The Five-Year Baby Secret (2006)
- Boardroom Bridegrooms (2007)
- The Secret Life of Lady Gabriella (2007)
- Reunited Marriage in a Million (2007)
- The Valentine Bride (2007)
- The Temp and the Tycoon (2008)
- Wedded in a Whirlwind (2008)
- SOS: Convenient Husband Required (2010)
- Tempted by Trouble (2011)
- Flirting with Italian (2011)
- The Last Woman He'd Ever Date (2012)
- The Bride's Baby (2014)

=== The Beaumont Brides Series ===
1. Wild Justice (1996)
2. Wild Lady (1997)
3. Wild Fire (1997)

=== Kavanagh Brothers Series ===
1. His Little Girl (1998)
2. A Suitable Groom (1998)

=== Boardroom Bridegrooms Series ===
1. The Corporate Bridegroom (2002)
2. The Marriage Merger (2002)
3. The Tycoon's Takeover (2002)

=== What Women Want Series Multi-Author ===
- The Bridesmaid's Reward (2002)

=== High Society Brides Series Multi-Author ===
- The Ordinary Princess (2003)

=== Heart to Heart Series Multi-Author ===
- The Marriage Miracle (2005)
- A Nanny for Keeps (2005)

=== Desert Brides Series Multi-Author ===
- The Sheikh's Guarded Heart (2006)

=== Trading Places ===
1. 'Christmas Angel for the Billionaire (2009)
2. Her Desert Dream (2009)

=== Collections ===
- Mother's Day Pack (2001)

=== Omnibus In Collaboration ===
- A Tender Christmas (2000) (with Emma Goldrick and Leigh Michaels)
- Stranded in Paradise (2001) (with Jacqueline Baird and Miranda Lee)
- The Engagement Effect: An Ordinary Girl / a Perfect Proposal (2001) (with Betty Neels)
- City Girls (2002) (with Jessica Hart and Penny Jordan)
- Wedding Countdown (2002) (with Helen Bianchin and Kim Lawrence)
- Summer Brides (2003) (with Susan Fox and Miranda Lee)
- Seduced by a Sultan (2004) (with Emma Darcy and Sandra Marton)
- Strictly Business: The Temp and the Tycoon / The Fiance Deal (2004) (with Hannah Bernard and Penny Jordan)
- In the Boss's Bed (2004) (with Sharon Kendrick and Carole Mortimer)
- The Doubtful Marriage / Secret Wedding (2005) (with Betty Neels)
- Risque Business (2005) (with Emma Darcy and Sharon Kendrick)
- Bringing Up Baby (2007) (with Jessica Hart and Marion Lennox)
- Baby On Board (by Liz Fielding: Secret Baby, Surprise Parents) (2013) (with Patricia Thayer and Raye Morgan)
- Weddings Collection (by Liz Fielding: His Runnaway Bride) (2014) (with Marie Ferrarella, Ally Blake, Debra D'Arcy, Carole Mortimer, Sandra Field and Sara Craven)
- Wedding Wows (by Liz Fielding: Reunited: Marriage in a Million) (2015) (4x3 books 12 different authors)
- Mistletoe Magic (by Liz Fielding: A Surprise Christmas Proposal) (2015) (with Carole Mortimer, Carol Marinelli, Judy Christenberry, Lucy Gordon and Joan Elliott Pickart)

=== Non fiction ===
- Liz Fielding's Little Book of Writing Romance (2012)

== Awards ==
Awards for Liz Fielding
Year	Nominated work	Category	Award	Result	Notes	Ref.
2001	The Best Man & The Bridesmaid	Traditional Romance	Romance Writers of America RITA Award	Won		
2005	A Family of His Own		Romantic Novelists' Association Love Story of the Year	Won		
2006	The Marriage Miracle	Short Contemporary Romance	Romance Writers of America RITA Award	Won		
