= Kate Walker (writer) =

British writer (born 1950)

Catherine Mary Wade
- Born: 7 May 1950 (age 76); Nottinghamshire, England
- Education: University College of Wales, Aberystwyth
- Occupation: Novelist
- Writing career
- Period: 1984-Present
- Genre: Romantic novels
- Website: kate-walker.com

Kate Walter (born 7 May 1950 in Nottinghamshire, England) was a popular British writer of 50 romance novels in Mills & Boon since 1984.

== Early life and education ==
Catherine Mary Wade was born on 7 May 1950 in Nottinghamshire, England of Irish extraction, but the family moved to West Yorkshire when she was just 18 months old. She was the middle child of five daughters.

She studied English and Library Science in the University College of Wales, Aberystwyth, where she met her husband. They married and installed in Lincolnshire. She worked until she was a mother.

== Career ==
As Kate Walker, she published her first novel in 1984.

== Written works ==
=== Single novels ===
- The Chalk Line (1984)
- First Man (1986)
- Game of Hazard (1986)
- Rough Diamond (1986)
- Broken Silence (1987)
- Captive Lover (1987)
- Man of Shadows (1987)
- The Cinderella Trap (1988)
- Chase the Dawn (1988)
- Leap in the Dark (1989)
- Jester's Girl (1989)
- The Golden Thief (1990)
- Runaway (1990)
- Give and Take (1991)
- No Gentleman (1992)
- Something Missing (1993)
- Shattered Mirror (1993)
- Calypso's Enchantment (1994)
- No Holding Back (1995)
- Flirting With Danger (1996)
- Hers for a Night (1996)
- The Unexpected Child (1997)
- The Groom's Revenge (1997)
- The Temptation Game (1998)
- Wife for a Day (1998)
- Fiancee by Mistake (1998)
- Saturday's Bride (1999)
- Constantine's Revenge (1999)
- Rafael's Love-Child (2000)
- Her Secret Bridegroom (2000)
- His Miracle Baby (2001)
- The Hostage Bride (2001)
- Desert Affair (2001)
- The Christmas Baby's Gift (2002)
- A Sicilian Husband (2003)
- The Antonakos Marriage (2005)
- At The Sheikh's Command (2006)
- The Italian's Forced Bride (2006)
- Sicilian Husband, Blackmailed Bride (2007)
- The Greek Tycoon's Unwilling Wife (2007)
- The Konstantos Marriage Demand (2009)
- The Proud Wife (2011)
- Return of the Stranger (2011)
- A Question of Honor (2014)
- Olivero's Outrageous Proposal (2015)
- Indebted To Moreno (2016)
- A Proposal To Secure His Vengeance (2018)

=== The Sicilian Brothers Series ===
1. The Sicilian's Wife (2002)
2. The Sicilian's Red-Hot Revenge (2007)

=== Nicolaides / Morgan Series ===
1. The Married Mistress (2003)
2. Their Secret Baby (2003)

=== Alcolar Family Trilogy ===
1. The Twelve-month Mistress (2004)
2. The Spaniard's Inconvenient Wife (2004)
3. Bound by Blackmail (2005)

=== Wedlocked! Series Multi-Author ===
- The Hired Husband (1999)

=== Omnibus In Collaboration ===
- Society Weddings (2002) (with Sharon Kendrick)
- Her Greek Tycoon (2003) (with Jacqueline Baird and Lynne Graham)
- The Midnight Hour (2004) (with Lilian Darcy and Kate Hoffmann)
- A Convenient Proposal (2004) (with Helen Bianchin and Lucy Gordon)
- His Secret Baby (2004) (with Robyn Donald and Miranda Lee)
- Virgin Brides (2005) (with Sharon Kendrick and Miranda Lee)
- In the Sheikh's Bed (2005) (with Sharon Kendrick and Michelle Reid)
- Christmas, Kids and Kisses (2006) (with Diana Hamilton and Renee Roszel)
- Bound by a Baby (2007) (with Catherine Spencer and Rebecca Winters)

=== Non-fiction ===
- A Straightforward Guide to Writing Romantic Fiction (2002)
- 12 Point Guide to Writing Romance (2004)

== References and resources ==
- Kate Walker's Official Website
- Kate Walker's Webpage in Harlequin Enterprises Ltd's Website
- Kate Walker's Webpage in Fantastic Fiction's Website
