= Leigh Michaels =

American writer

LeAnn Lemberger
- Born: July 27, 1954 (age 72); Iowa, United States
- Occupation: Novelist
- Spouse: Michael W. Lemberger
- Writing career
- Pen name: Leigh Michaels
- Period: 1984–2006
- Genre: Romantic novel
- Website: www.leighmichaels.com

Leigh Michaels is the pseudonym used by LeAnn Lemberger (born July 27, 1954, in Iowa, United States), a popular United States writer of over 80 romance novels. She published her novels in Harlequin Enterprises Ltd since 1984 to 2006. She also teaches romance writing for Gothan Writers' Workshop among other places.

== Biography ==
LeAnn was born on July 27, 1954, in Iowa, United States. She received a Bachelor of Arts in journalism from Drake University in Des Moines, Iowa, after three years of study and maintained a 3.93 grade-point average. She received the Robert Bliss Award as top-ranking senior in the School of Journalism and Mass Communication, and won a national William Randolph Hearst Award for feature-writing as an undergraduate.

When LeAnn was very young she read romance novels, and when she was fifteen, she wrote her first romance novel and burned it. She burned five more complete manuscripts before submitting one to a publisher. The first submission was accepted by Harlequin Enterprises, the only publisher to look at it, and was published in 1984 under the pseudonym Leigh Michaels (her husband name).

LeAnn married to Michael W. Lemberger, an artist-photographer.

== Awards ==
- Ties That Bind: Finalist for Best Traditional Romance novel in the RITA Award by Romance Writers of America.
- The Lake Effect: Finalist for Best Traditional Romance novel in the RITA Award by Romance Writers of America.
- Traveling Man: Finalist for Best Traditional Romance novel in the RITA Award by Romance Writers of America.
- The Unlikely Santa: Finalist for Best Traditional Romance novel in the RITA Award by Romance Writers of America.
- The Daddy Trap: Finalist for Best Traditional Romance novel in the RITA Award by Romance Writers of America.

== Bibliography ==
=== Single Novels ===
- Wednesday's Child (1985)
- Deadline for Love (1985)
- Come Next Summer (1985)
- Dreams to Keep (1985)
- Leaving Home (1985)
- Capture a Shadow (1986)
- Brittany's Castle (1986)
- Carlisle Pride (1987)
- Rebel with a Cause (1987)
- Strictly Business (1987)
- Close Collaboration (1988)
- Just a Normal Marriage (1988)
- Shades of Yesterday (1988)
- Let Me Count the Ways (1988)
- With No Reservations (1989)
- An Imperfect Love (1990)
- Promise Me Tomorrow (1990)
- Temporary Measures (1991)
- Old School Ties (1992)
- The Lake Effect (1993)
- Safe in My Heart (1993)
- Ties That Blind (1993)
- House of Dreams (1994)
- The Only Solution (1994)
- A Singular Honeymoon (1994)
- Traveling Man (1994)
- Marrying the Boss! (1996)
- Dialogue Ain't Cheap (1998)
- The Men in My Life (1998)
- The Problem with Conflict (1998)
- Her Husband to Be (1999)
- Unraveling the Romance (1999)
- Tempting a Tycoon (1999)
- His Trophy Wife (2001)
- Backwards Honeymoon (2001)
- The Bride Assignment (2003)
- Assignment: Twins (2004)
- The Tycoon's Proposal (2006)

=== Logan Brothers Series ===
1. The Grand Hotel (1984)
2. Touch Not My Heart (1985)

=== Springhill Series ===
1. Sell Me a Dream (1986)
2. Once and for Always (1989)
3. An Uncommon Affair (1990)
4. The Best Made Plans (1992)
5. Family Secrets (1994)

=== Tyler-Royalel Series ===
1. O'Hara's Legacy (1986)
2. A New Desire (1988)
3. The Unlikely Santa (1995)

=== McKenna Family Series ===
1. No Place Like Home (1988)
2. A Matter of Principal (1989)
3. Garrett's Back in Town (1991)
4. The Unexpected Landlord (1992)
5. Dating Games (1993)

=== San Valentin! Series ===
1. The Perfect Divorce! (1997)
2. The Fake Fiance! (1997)

=== Finding Mr. Right Series ===
1. The Billionaire Date (1998)
2. The Playboy Assignment (1998)
3. The Husband Project (1998)

=== Hiring Ms. Right Series ===
1. Husband on Demand (2000)
2. Bride on Loan (2000)
3. Wife on Approval (2000)

=== Men: Made in America Series Multi-Author ===
15. Kiss Yesterday Goodbye (1984)

=== American Heroes: Against All Odds Series Multi-Author ===
15. Exclusively Yours (1988)

=== Sealed with a Kiss Series Multi-Author ===
- Invitation to Love (1994)

=== Kids & Kisses Series Multi-Author ===
- Family Secrets (1994)

=== Pages & Privileges Series Multi-Author ===
- Taming a Tycoon (1995)

=== Holding Out for a Hero Series Multi-Author ===
- The Only Man for Maggie (1996)
- The Daddy Trap (1996)

=== Baby Boom Series Multi-Author ===
- Baby You're Mine! (1997)

=== Marrying the Boss Series Multi-Author ===
- The Boss and the Baby (1999)
- The Corporate Wife (2000)

=== Daddy Boom Series Multi-Author ===
- The Tycoon's Baby (1999)

=== Nearlyweds Series Multi-Author ===
- The Bridal Swap (1999)

=== A Walk Down the Aisle: Wedding Celebration Series Multi-Author ===
- A Convenient Affair (2001)

=== Contract Brides Series Multi-Author ===
- Bride by Design (2002)

=== To Have and To Hold Series Multi-Author ===
- Maybe Married (2002)

=== Nine To Five Serie Multi-Author ===
- The Boss's Daughter (2002)
- The Marriage Market (2003)
- The Billionaire Bid (2003)
- The Corporate Marriage Campaign (2005)

=== What Women Want Series Multi-Author ===
- Part-time Fiance (2003)
- The Takeover Bid (2003)
- The Husband Sweepstake (2004)

=== Collections ===
- Why Can't a Woman Be More Like a Man? (2006)

=== Omnibus In Collaboration ===
- My Valentine (1992) (with Katherine Arthur, Debbie Macomber and Peggy Nicholson)
- A Man for Mum: Four Stories in One (1999) (with Penny Jordan)
- Mothers-to-be (1999) (with Emma Darcy and Lynne Graham)
- A Tender Christmas (2000) (with Liz Fielding and Emma Goldrick)
- Switched at the Altar (2001) (with Miranda Lee, Susan Napier and Rebecca Winters)
- Bachelors' Babies (2001) (with Lynne Graham and Sharon Kendrick)
- Temporary Santa (2003) (with Cathy Gillen Thacker)
- Billionaire Grooms (2006) (with Emma Darcy and Sara Wood)
- Bewitched by the Boss (2006) (with Alison Fraser and Charlotte Lamb)

=== Non fiction ===
- Writing the Romance Novel (1996)
- A Taste of Love (1998)
- Writing the Romance Novel: Updated (1999)
- Creating Romantic Characters: Bringing Life to Your Romance Novel (2002)
- On Writing Romance: How to Craft a Novel That Sells (2007)

== References and Resources ==
- Leigh Michaels's Official Website
- Harlequin Enterprises Ltd
