= Lynne Graham =

Northern Irish author (born 1956)

- Born: 30 July 1956 (age 70); Northern Ireland
- Education: University of Edinburgh
- Occupation: Novelist
- Writing career
- Period: 1987 - present
- Genre: Romantic novel
- Website: www.lynnegraham.com

Lynne Graham (born 30 July 1956 in Northern Ireland) is a Northern Irish author of over 100 romance novels. She published her novels in Mills & Boon since 1987.

== Biography ==
Graham was born on 30 July 1956 in Northern Ireland to an Irish-Scottish family. She met her husband when she was 14, and before marrying she completed a degree at the University of Edinburgh. Graham and her husband have five children, one natural and four adopted, two from Sri Lanka and two from Guatemala. Most of her books are set in Europe.

== Bibliography ==
=== Single Novels ===
- Bittersweet Passion (1987)
- The Veranchetti Marriage (1988)
- An Arabian Courtship (1990)
- An Insatiable Passion (1990)
- A Fiery Baptism (1991)
- Tempestuous Reunion (1991)
- A Vengeful Passion (1994)
- Angel of Darkness (1994)
- Indecent Deception (1994)
- The Heat of Passion (1995)
- Bond of Hatred (1995)
- Crime of Passion (1995)
- A Savage Betrayal (1995)
- The Unfaithful Wife (1995)
- The Trophy Husband (1996)
- Prisoner of Passion (1996)
- The Desert Bride (1996)
- Second-Time Bride (1997)
- The Secret Wife (1997)
- The Winter Bride (1997)
- Mistress and Mother (1997)
- The Reluctant Husband (1998)
- One Night With His Wife (1999)
- The Spanish Groom (1999)
- The Expectant Bride (1999)
- The Cozakis Bride (2000)
- The Sicilian's Mistress (2000)
- Don Joaquin's Pride (2000)
- Damiano's Return (2000)
- Duarte's Child (2001)
- Rafaello's Mistress (2001)
- The Italian's Wife (2001)
- The Contaxis Baby (2002)
- A Mediterranean Marriage (2002)
- The Stephanides Pregnancy (2004)
- The Mistress Wife (2004)
- Married by Arrangement (2005)
- Emerald Mistress (2005) aka Ballyflynn
- Mistress Bought and Paid for (2006)
- Reluctant Mistress, Blackmailed Wife (2006)
- The Sheikh's Innocent Bride (2006)
- Claiming His Wife and Child (2006)
- The Greek's Chosen Wife (2006)
- The Italian's Inexperienced Mistress (2007)
- Petrakos Bride (2007)
- Latin Loving (2007)
- The Greek Tycoon's Blackmailed Mistress (2009)

=== Nancy Leeward's Goddaughters series ===
1. Married to a Mistress (1998)
2. Contract Baby (1998)
3. The Vengeful Husband (1998)

=== The Rich, Ruthless and Really Handsome ===
1. The Desert Sheik's Captive Wife(2007)
2. The Greek Tycoon's Defiant Bride(2008)
3. The Italian Billionaire's Pregnant Bride(2008)

=== Carlton Sisters series ===
1. An Arabian Marriage (2002)
2. The Disobedient Mistress (2002)
3. The Heiress Bride (2002)
4. Dark Angel (2003)

=== Brides Of L'Amour series ===
1. The Frenchman's Love-child (2003)
2. The Italian Boss's Mistress (2003)
3. The Banker's Convenient Wife (2004)

=== Walk Down the Aisle series multi-author ===
- The Arabian Mistress (2001)

=== Virgin Brides, Arrogant Husbands series ===
- The Greek Tycoon’s Disobedient Bride (2008)
- The Ruthless Magnate’s Virgin Mistress (2009)
- The Spanish Billionaire’s Pregnant Wife(2009)

=== The Pregnant Brides series ===
- Desert Prince, Bride of Innocence (2009)
- Ruthless Magnate, Convenient Bride (2009)
- Greek Tycoon, Inexperienced Mistress (2010)

=== The Drakos Baby ===
1. Part One: The Pregnancy Shock (2010)
2. Part Two: A Stormy Greek Marriage (2010)

=== Collections ===
- Christmas Crackers: Savage Betrayal, Yuletide Bride, Baby for Christmas, Christmas Angel (1995)
- Mother's Day Gift Pack: One Night with His Wife, Fatal Bride, Everything About Him (2000)
- Arabian Nights (2000)
- The Pursuit (2003)
- Unfaithful Wife / Trophy Husband (2004)
- Heat of Passion / Savage Betrayal (2004)
- Prisoner of Passion / Desert Bride (2006)
- Marrying the Millionaire (2006)

=== Omnibus In Collaboration ===
- Captive Hearts (1998) (with Robyn Donald and Charlotte Lamb)
- Escapade (1998) (with Margot Early, Vicki Lewis Thompson and Rebecca York)
- Desert Heat (1999) (with Emma Darcy and Sandra Marton)
- Mothers-to-be (1999) (with Emma Darcy and Leigh Michaels)
- Her Baby Secret (1999) (with Jacqueline Baird and Day Leclaire)
- Latin Lovers (2000) (with Lucy Gordon and Penny Jordan)
- Christmas with a Latin Lover (2001) (with Lucy Gordon and Penny Jordan)
- Bachelors' Babies (2001) (with Sharon Kendrick and Leigh Michaels)
- The Greek Tycoons (2001) (with Helen Bianchin and Michelle Reid)
- Greek Grooms (2001) (with Michelle Reid)
- Latin Liaisons (2002) (with Emma Darcy)
- Passionate Playboys (2002) (with Jacqueline Baird and Amanda Browning)
- One More Time (2003) (with Jayne Ann Krentz and Christine Rimmer)
- Mediterranean Millionaires (2003) (with Lucy Gordon and Michelle Reid)
- Business Affairs (2003) (with Helen Brooks and Kim Lawrence)
- Her Italian Boss (2003) (with Kim Lawrence)
- Her Greek Tycoon (2003) (with Jacqueline Baird and Kate Walker)
- Her Latin Lover's Revenge (2005) (with Jane Porter and Michelle Reid)
- Prisoner of Passion / The Playboy's Seduction (2005) (with Lucy Monroe)
- Millionaire's Mistress (2006) (with Jacqueline Baird and Cathy Williams)
- Sheikh's Woman (2006) (with Jane Porter)
- Mediterranean Weddings (2007) (with Julia James and Susan Stephens)
- Mediterranean Men (Irresistible Italians / Italian's Wife / Italian's Passionate Proposal) (2007) (with Sarah Morgan)
