= Helen Bianchin =

Australian romance writer (born 1939)

Helen Shirley Bianchin
- Born: 20 February 1939 (age 87); New Zealand
- Occupation: Novelist
- Writing career
- Pen name: Helen Bianchin
- Period: 1975–2020
- Genre: Romantic novel

Helen Bianchin (born 20 February 1939) is a New Zealand-born Australian writer. Since 1975, she has written over 55 romance novels for Mills & Boon.

== Biography ==
Bianchin was born on 20 February 1939 in New Zealand. She worked as a legal secretary, then spent two years working and travelling in Australia. In Cairns, she met Danilo Bianchin, an Italian from Treviso; six months later, they married. They had one daughter, Lucia, and two sons Angelo and Peter. Since 1981, the family has resided in Australia.

== Bibliography ==
=== Single Novels ===
- The Willing Heart (1975)
- Bewildered Haven (1976)
- Avenging Angel (1977)Harliquin Romance #2084
- Hills of Home (1978)Harliquin Romance #2175
- Vines in Splendour (1978)
- Stormy Possession (1979)
- Edge of Spring (1979)
- Master of Uluru (1980)Harliquin Romance #2378
- Devil in Command (1980)
- Savage Touch (1981)
- Wildfire Encounter (1982)
- Savage pagan (1984)
- Yesterday's Shadow (1984)
- Sweet Tempest (1984)
- Dark Tyrant (1984)
- Bitter Encore (1985)
- Dark Enchantment (1986)
- An Awakening Desire (1987)
- Touch the Flame (1989)
- The Tiger's Lair (1990)
- The Stefanos Marriage (1990)
- No Gentle Seduction (1991)
- Reluctant Captive (1992)
- Stormfire (1992)
- Passion's Mistress (1994)
- Dangerous Alliance (1994)
- Desert Mistress (1996)
- The Bridal Bed (1998)
- A Convenient Bridegroom (1999)
- Mistress by Arrangement (1999)
- Mistress by Contract (2001)
- The Husband Test (2001)
- The Wedding Ultimatum (2002)
- The Pregnancy Proposal (2003)
- In the Spaniard's Bed (2003)
- The Spaniard's Baby Bargain (2004)
- His Pregnancy Ultimatum (2004)
- The Disobedient Bride (2005)
- The Greek's Bought Wife (2005)
- Purchased by the Billionaire (2006)
- The High-Society Wife (2006)
- The Marriage Possession (2007)
- The Greek Tycoon's Virgin Wife (2007)
- The Italian's Ruthless Marriage Command (2009)
- Bride, Bought and Paid for (2009)
- The Andreou Marriage Arrangement (2010)
- Public Marriage, Private Secrets (2010)
- Alessandro's Prize (2011)
- Alexei's Passionate Revenge (2016)

=== Santanas Brothers Series ===
1. Forgotten Husband (1995)
2. The Marriage Arrangement (2001)

=== Marriages Series ===
1. An Ideal Marriage? (1997)
2. The Marriage Campaign (1998)

=== Lanier Series ===
1. The Marriage Deal (2000)
2. The Husband Assignment (2000)

=== Dimitriades Series ===
1. A Passionate Surrender (2002)
2. The Greek Bridegroom (2002)

=== Year Down Under Series Multi-Author ===
- No Gentle Seduction (1991)

=== Forbidden! Series ===
- Desert Mistress (1996)

=== Do Not Disturb Series Multi-Author ===
- The Bridal Bed (1998)

=== Expecting! Series Multi-Author ===
- The Pregnancy Proposal (2003)
- His Pregnancy Ultimatum (2004)

=== Wedlocked! Series Multi-Author ===
- Purchased by the Billionaire (2006)
- The Marriage Possession (2007)

=== Collections ===
- Forgive and Forget (1998)
- Forgotten Husband / Desert Mistress (2004)
- Willing Heart / Ideal Marriage? (2005)

=== Omnibus in Collaboration ===
- Romance on Holiday (1983) (with Vanessa James, Carole Mortimer and Celia Scott)
- Avenging Angel / Sown in the Wind / Cruise to a Wedding (1985) (with Jean S. MacLeod and Betty Neels)
- Christmas Affairs (1998) (with Sharon Kendrick and Sandra Marton)
- The Australians (2000) (with Miranda Lee and Margaret Way)
- The Greek Tycoons (2001) (with Lynne Graham and Michelle Reid)
- Weddings Down Under (2001) (with Jessica Hart and Margaret Way)
- Australian Attraction (2002) (with Miranda Lee)
- Wedding Countdown (2002) (with Liz Fielding and Kim Lawrence)
- Australian Playboys (2003) (with Marion Lennox and Margaret Way)
- Foreign Affairs (2004) (with Anne Mather and Michelle Reid)
- Coming Home (2004) (with Lucy Gordon and Rebecca Winters)
- Coming Home for Christmas (2003) (with Lucy Gordon and Rebecca Winters)
- Claiming His Mistress (2004) (with Lucy Gordon and Sharon Kendrick)
- A Convenient Proposal (2004) (with Lucy Gordon and Kate Walker)
- His Boardroom Mistress (2005) (with Sandra Marton and Cathy Williams)
- Her Greek Millionaire (2005) (with Helen Brooks and Sara Wood)
- Latin Affairs (2006) (with Sharon Kendrick and Kathryn Ross)
- Convenient Weddings (2006) (with Jacqueline Baird and Kathryn Ross)
- Gorgeous Greeks (2007) (with Julia James)
