= Jacqueline Baird =

British writer

- Born: 1 April 1941; Northumberland, England
- Died: 8 November 2026 (aged 85); North East England
- Occupation: Novelist
- Writing career
- Pen name: Jacqueline Baird
- Period: 1988–present
- Genre: Romantic novel

Jacqueline Baird (born 1 April in Northumberland, England) is popular English writer of over 30 romance novels since 1988.

== Awards ==
- Romantic Times Reviewers Choice Award 1998. Best Harlequin Presents
- Romantic Times Wishes
- Numerous Waldenbooks Series Best-seller List
- Numerous British Best-seller List
- USA Today Best -seller List. April 2010

== Bibliography ==
=== Single novels ===
- Dark Desiring (1988)
- Shattered Trust (1990) Romano2(Kristine Series) by Martha Cecilia Tagalog version.
- Passionate Betrayal (1991)
- Dishonourable Proposal (1992)
- Guilty Passion (1992)
- Master of Passion (1993)
- Gamble on Passion (1994)
- Nothing Changes Love (1994)
- A Devious Desire (1995)
- The Valentine Child (1995)
- Raul's Revenge (1996)
- The Reluctant Fiancee (1997)
- Mistaken for a Mistress (1997)
- Giordanni's Proposal (1998)
- A Husband of Convenience (1999)
- Husband on Trust (2000)
- A Most Passionate Revenge (2000)
- Marriage at His Convenience (2001)
- The Italian's Runaway Bride (2001)
- The Greek Tycoon's Revenge (2002)
- Wife, Bought and Paid for (2002)
- At the Spaniard's Pleasure (2003)
- His Inherited Bride (2003)
- The Greek Tycoon's Love-child (2004)
- Pregnancy of Revenge (2005)
- The Italian's Blackmailed Mistress (2006)
- Bought by the Greek Tycoon (2006)
- Aristides' Convenient Wife (2007)
- The Italian Billionaire's Ruthless Revenge (2008)
- The Billionaire's Blackmailed Bride (2008)
- Untamed Italian Blackmailed Innocent(2010)
- The Sabbides Secret Baby(2010)
- Picture of Innocence(2011)
- Returen of the Moralis Wife(2012)
- la maitresse trahie (2012 )
- The Cost of Her Innocence(2013)

=== Italian Husbands Series Multi-Author ===
- Pregnancy of Revenge (2005)

=== Collections ===
- Dark Desiring / Dishonourable Proposal (2004)

=== Omnibus ===
- Father Knows Last: High Risk, Guilty Passion (1996) (with Emma Darcy)
- Passion with a Vengeance (1998) (with Sara Craven and Emma Darcy)
- Her Baby Secret (1999) (with Lynne Graham and Day Leclaire)
- Father and Child (2000) (with Emma Darcy and Sandra Marton)
- Stranded in Paradise (2001) (with Liz Fielding and Miranda Lee)
- Passionate Playboys (2002) (with Amanda Browning and Lynne Graham)
- Her Greek Tycoon (2003) (with Lynne Graham and Kate Walker)
- Passion in Paradise (2004) (with Sara Craven and Cathy Williams)
- Hot Summer Loving (2004) (with Sandra Field and Miranda Lee)
- The Tycoon's Love Child (2005) (with Robyn Donald and Anne Mather)
- Red-Hot Revenge (2006) (with Lee Wilkinson and Cathy Williams)
- Convenient Weddings (2006) (with Helen Bianchin and Kathryn Ross)
- Millionaire's Mistress (2006) (with Lynne Graham and Cathy Williams)
- Seductive Spaniards (2007) (with Diana Hamilton)
