= Emma Robinson (author) =

British novelist and playwright (1814–1890)

Emma Robinson (1814 – 18 December 1890) was an English writer. All of her works were published anonymously or using pseudonyms.

== Biography ==
The daughter of Joseph Robinson, a bookseller, she was born in London. In 1844, she published Whitefriars, or, The Days of Charles the Second: an Historical Romance, a historical novel, and Richelieu in Love, a historical play. She published seven more historical novels from 1844 to 1849 and seven more from 1854 to 1865. She also published five critiques of the society of the time, beginning with The Gold-Worshippers, or, The Days We Live in: a Future Historical Novel in 1851. In 1858, she published Mauleverer's Divorce, or, The Story of a Woman's Wrongs, which dealt with issues raised by the Matrimonial Causes Act 1857. Her 1862 novel Which Wins, Love or Money? provided much of the content for Henry Thornton Craven's play Philomel. In 1848, she published a second play The Revolt of Flanders, An Historical Tragedy in Five Acts.

The performance of Robinson's play Richelieu in Love, already in rehearsal, was prohibited by the Lord Chamberlain's office in 1844 because it dealt with Charles I, then viewed as a forbidden topic. A revised version of the play was licensed for performance in 1852.

In 1862, she was granted a civil list pension. She published The Matrimonial Vanity Fair, a critique of the matrimonial market and her last published work, in 1867.

Robinson was diagnosed with mental illness sometime after 1867. She died in Norwood Green at the age of 76 at the London County Lunatic Asylum due to bronchitis, heart disease and cirrhosis.

== Works ==
- Whitefriars: or, The Days of Charles the Second (1843)
- Whitehall: or, The Days of Charles the First (1845)
- Caesar Borgia: A Historical Romance (1846)
- The Maid of Orleans: A Romantic Chronicle (1849)
- Owen Tudor: An Historical Romance (1849)
- The Armourer's Daughter: or, The Border Riders (1850)
- The Gold-Worshippers: or, The Days We Live In, A Future Historical Novel (1851)
- Westminster Abbey: or, The Days of the Reformation (1854)
- The City Banker: or, Love and Money (1856)
- Mauleverer's Divorce: A Story of Woman's Wrongs (1858)
- Which Wins, Love or Money? (1862)
- Cynthia Thorold (1862)
- Dorothy Firebrace: or, The Armourer's Daughter of Birmingham (1864)
- Madeleine Graham (1864)
- Christmas at Old Court (1864)
- The Matrimonial Vanity Fair (1868)
