= Betty Neels =

British writer

Evelyn Jessy Neels Meijer
- Born: Evelyn Jessy Neels; 15 September 1909; Leyton, Essex, England
- Died: 7 June 2001 (aged 91); England
- Occupations: Nurse, midwife, Night Superintendent, then a novelist
- Spouse: Johannes Meijer (m. 1942)
- Children: 1
- Writing career
- Pen name: Betty Neels
- Language: English
- Period: 1969–2001
- Genre: Romance novel

Betty Neels (born 15 September 1909 in Leyton, England – d. 7 June 2001 in England) was an English prolific writer of over 134 romance novels (first published entirely for Mills & Boon in United Kingdom and later reprinted in the North America by Harlequin), beginning in 1969 and continuing until her death. Her work is known for being particularly chaste.

== Biography ==
=== Personal life ===
Evelyn Jessy "Betty" Neels was born on 15 September 1909 in Leyton (then part of Essex but now in Greater London) to a family with firm roots in the Civil Service. She spent her childhood and youth in Devonshire. She was sent away to boarding school. Between 1934-1937 she trained as a nurse at the Royal Devon and Exeter Hospital and then went on to train as a nurse, becoming a State Registered nurse in 1937. In September 1939 she was working at the Torbay Hospital.

In1939 she was called up to the Territorial Army Nursing Service (TANS), which later became the Queen Alexandra Reserves, and was sent to France with the Casualty Clearing Station, until the invasion of France in 1940. She was commissioned into the TANS as a Sister on 30 May 1941. Later she worked in Scotland and Northern Ireland, where she met a Dutchman, named Johannes Meijer. They married in 1942 and had a daughter in 1945.

The married couple lived in London, and later they moved to the Netherlands for thirteen years, where she resumed her nursing career. When the family returned to England, she continued her nursing. When she retired, she had reached the position of Night Superintendent.

Neels died in hospital on 7 June 2001, aged 91.

=== Writing career ===
Her first book, Sister Peters in Amsterdam, was published in 1969. Her career with Mills & Boon or Harlequin spanned 30 years, and she continued to write into her 90th year. She wrote 134 novels.

Her novels have several recurring themes. The main male and female characters are often brought together by circumstances before love flourishes. The heroine is usually either a Cinderella or a "splendidly built" queen-sized woman. A character will often have expertise in antiques. Family pets are common. The male protagonist is often a Dutch surgeon. Robin Ince has commented on the fact that her heroes are often Dutch. He also notes that some of her books have been re-published under different titles.

== Bibliography ==
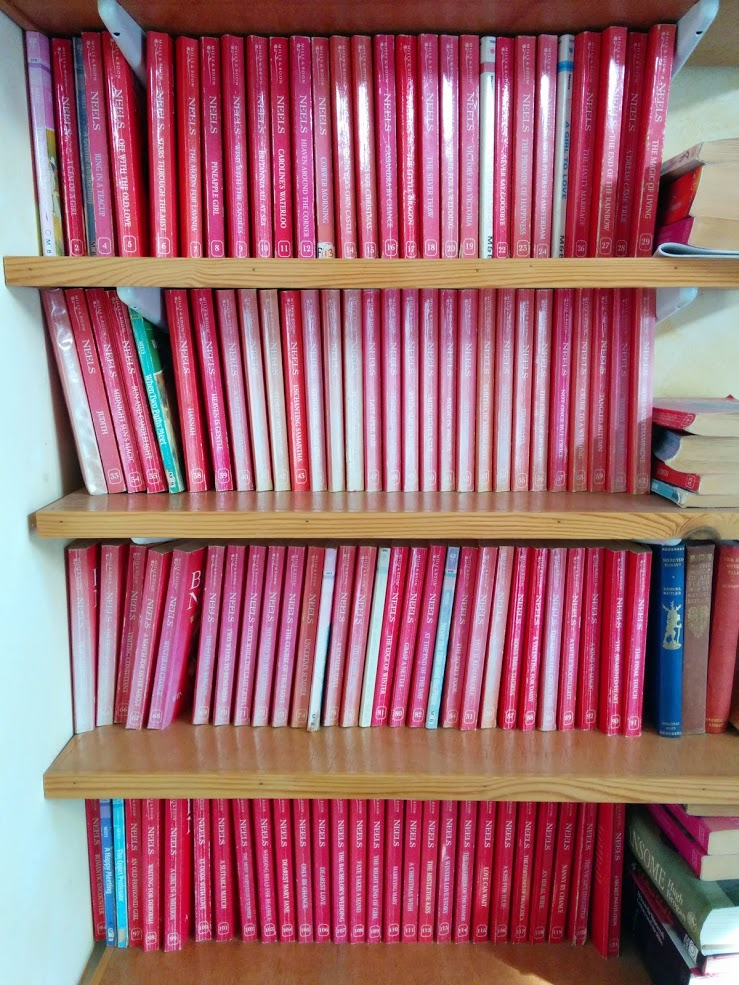
A collection of novels by Betty Neels

=== Single Novels ===
- Sister Peters in Amsterdam (1969)
- Amazon in an Apron (1969) aka A Match for Sister Maggy / Nurse in Holland
- Blow Hot, Blow Cold (1970) aka Surgeon from Holland / Visiting Surgeon / Visiting Consultant
- Tempestuous April (1970) aka Nurse Harriet Goes to Holland
- Damsel in Green (1970)
- Fate is Remarkable (1970)
- Tulips for Augusta (1971)
- Tangled Autumn (1971)
- The Fifth Day of Christmas (1971)
- Tabitha in Moonlight (1975)
- Wish with the Candles (1972)
- Saturday's Child (1972)
- Uncertain Summer (1972)
- Victory for Victoria (1972)
- Winter of Change (1973)
- Cassandra by Chance (1973)
- Three for a Wedding (1973)
- Stars Through the Mist (1973)
- Enchanting Samantha (1973)
- The Gemel Ring (1974)
- The Magic of Living (1974)
- Cruise to a Wedding (1974)
- The End of the Rainbow (1974)
- A Small Slice of Summer (1975)
- Henrietta's Own Castle (1975)
- A Star Looks Down (1975)
- The Moon for Lavinia (1975)
- Cobweb Morning (1975)
- Heaven is Gentle (1975)
- Roses for Christmas (1975)
- The Edge of Winter (1976)
- Esmeralda (1976)
- A Gem of a Girl (1976)
- Grasp a Nettle (1977)
- A Matter of Chance (1977)
- Pineapple Girl (1977)
- The Little Dragon (1977)
- The Hasty Marriage (1977)
- Britannia All at Sea (1978)
- Philomena's Miracle (1978)
- Never While the Grass Grows (1978)
- Ring in a Teacup (1978)
- Sun and Candlelight (1979)
- The Promise of Happiness (1979)
- Midnight Sun's Magic (1979)
- Winter Wedding (1979)
- Last April Fair (1980)
- The Silver Thaw (1980)
- Caroline's Waterloo (1980)
- Hannah (1980)
- When May Follows (1980)
- Not Once But Twice (1981)
- An Apple from Eve (1981)
- Heaven Round the Corner (1981)
- Judith (1982)
- A Girl to Love (1982)
- All Else Confusion (1982)
- A Dream Came True (1982)
- Midsummer Star (1983)
- Roses and Champagne (1983)
- Never Say Goodbye (1983)
- Never Too Late (1983)
- Once for All Time (1984)
- Year's Happy Ending (1984)
- Polly (1984)
- Heidelberg Wedding (1984)
- At the End of the Day (1985)
- A Summer Idyll (1985)
- Magic in Vienna (1985)
- Never the Time and the Place (1985)
- A Girl Named Rose (1986)
- Two Weeks to Remember (1986)
- The Secret Pool (1986)
- Stormy Springtime (1987)
- Off with the Old Love (1987)
- The Doubtful Marriage (1987)
- A Gentle Awakening (1987)
- The Course of True Love (1988)
- When Two Paths Meet (1988)
- Paradise for Two (1988)
- The Fateful Bargain (1989)
- No Need to Say Good-Bye (1989)
- The Chain of Destiny (1989)
- Hilltop Tryst (1989)
- The Convenient Wife (1990)
- The Girl with Green Eyes (1990)
- A Suitable Match (1990)
- Roses Have Thorns
- The Most Marvellous Summer (1991)
- The Final Touch (1991)
- A Little Moonlight (1991)
- A Kind of Magic (1991)
- An Unlikely Romance (1992)
- Romantic Encounter (1992)
- The Quiet Professor (1992)
- An Old-Fashioned Girl (1992)
- The Awakened Heart (1993)
- At Odds with Love (1993)
- A Girl in a Million (1993)
- A Valentine for Daisy (1993)
- Dearest Love
- A Secret Infatuation (1994)
- Wedding Bells for Beatrice (1994)
- A Christmas Wish
- Waiting for Deborah (1994)
- The Bachelor's Wedding
- Dearest Mary Jane (1994)
- Fate Takes a Hand (1995)
- The Right Kind of Girl
- The Mistletoe Kiss (1997)
- Marrying Mary (1996)
- A Kiss for Julie (1996)
- The Vicar's Daughter (1996)
- Only by Chance'(1996)
- The Daughter of the Manor (1997)
- Love Can Wait (1997)
- The Fortunes of Francesca (1997)
- Nanny by Chance (1998)
- An Ideal Wife (1998)
- A Winter Love Story (1998)
- Discovering Daisy (1999)
- A Good Wife (1999)
- Making Sure of Sarah (1999)
- An Independent Woman (2001)

=== The Final Touch Series ===
1. The Final Touch (1991)
2. A Happy Meeting (1992)

=== Dr Fforde Series ===
1. Always and Forever (2000)
2. The Doctor's Girl (2001)

=== First Class Series Multi-Author ===
- Roses Have Thorns (1990)

=== Kids & Kisses Multi-Author ===
- A Valentine for Daisy (1993)

=== Family Ties Multi-Author ===
- A Christmas Wish (1994)

=== Sealed with a Kiss Multi-Author ===
- Dearest Love (1995)

=== Holding Out for a Hero Multi-Author ===
- The Bachelor's Wedding (1995)

=== Baby Boon Multi-Author ===
- The Right Kind of Girl (1995)

=== White Weddings Multi-Author ===
- An Innocent Bride (1999)
- Matilda's Wedding (2000)

=== White Wedding Multi-Author ===
- Emma's Wedding (2001)

=== Collections ===
- Best of Betty Neels: Britannia All at Sea, The Little Dragon (1985)
- Sister Peters in Amsterdam / Nurse in Holland / Blow Hot, Blow Cold (1989)
- Christmas Gift Set (1998)
- The Proposal / Making Sure of Sarah (2001)
- Not Once But Twice / A Girl Named Rose (2002)
- The Christmas Proposal / A Christmas Romance (2001)
- Christmas Gift Pack (2001)
- The Most Marvellous Summer / A Summer Idyll (2002)
- Only by Chance / A Happy Meeting (2002)
- Tangled Autumn / The Edge of Winter (2002)
- The Secret Pool / The Girl with Green Eyes (2002)
- Winter of Change / A Winter Love Story (2002)
- A Betty Neels Christmas (2002)
- Sun and Candlelight / A Star Looks Down (2003)
- Matilda's Wedding / An Innocent Bride (2003)
- Dearest Mary Jane / Romantic Encounter (2003)
- Last April Fair / The Course of True Love (2003)
- The Promise of Happiness / Caroline's Waterloo (2003)
- Sister Peters in Amsterdam / Emma's Wedding (2003)
- The Christmas Collection (2003)
- Christmas Wishes (2003)
- Betty Neels Bridal Collection (2007)

=== Omnibus in Collaboration ===
- A Wife for Andrew / Bitter Masquerade / Fate Is Remarkable (1971) (with Lucy Gillen and Margery Hilton)
- Avenging Angel / Sown in the Wind / Cruise to a Wedding (1985) (with Helen Bianchin and Jean S. MacLeod)
- The House in the Foothills / The Short Engagement / Henrietta's Own Castle (1986) (with Mons Daveson and Marjorie Lewty)
- The Little Dragon / Adair of Starlight Peaks / The Dark Warrior (1987) (with Essie Summers and Mary Wibberley)
- Two for the Heart: The Proposal / The Engagement (1994) (with Ellen James)
- Christmas Miracles (1996) (with Carole Mortimer and Rebecca Winters)
- Nearly Weds! (1999): Making Sure of Sarah (with Penny Jordan, They're Wed Again, and Carole Mortimer, The Man She'll Marry)
- Mistletoe Magic (1999) (with Margaret Way and Rebecca Winters)
- Mistletoe Miracles: Dearest Eulalia / The Extra-special Gift / The Doorstep Baby (2000) (with Catherine George and Marion Lennox)
- Marrying a Doctor (2001) (with Caroline Anderson)
- The Engagement Effect: An Ordinary Girl / A Perfect Proposal (2001) (with Liz Fielding)
- A Christmas To Remember (2004) (with Debbie Macomber and Jessica Steele)
- The Doubtful Marriage / A Convenient Marriage (2005) (with Liz Fielding)
- All I Want for Christmas... (2005) (with Jessica Steele and Margaret Way)
- Christmas Treasures (2006) (with Caroline Anderson and Helen Brooks)
- Valentine Love Affairs (2006) (with Catherine George)
