= Linda Sole =

British writer (born 1950)

Linda M. Sole
- Born: 1950 (age 75–76); Swindon, Wiltshire, England
- Occupation: novelist
- Writing career
- Pen name: Lynn Granville, Anne Herries, Linda Sole, Emma Quincey, Juliana Linden, Cathy Sharp
- Language: English
- Period: 1980–present
- Genres: Romance, suspense
- Notable awards: RoNA Rose Award

Linda Sole (born 1950 in Swindon, Wiltshire, England) is a British writer of romance and suspense novels who writes under the pseudonyms of Lynn Granville, Anne Herries, Emma Quincey, Cathy Sharp, Rosie Clarke, and Juliana Linden, as well as her own name. In 2004, her novel A Damnable Rogue won the Love Story of the Year Award by the Romantic Novelists' Association.

== Biography ==
Linda M. Sole was born on 1950 in Swindon, Wiltshire, England, the daughter of a schoolteacher and a ladies' hairdresser. At 9, her family moved to Ely in Cambridgeshire, where she attended the local school. After leaving school at 15, she worked as a hairdresser in her father's business until she married at 18. She worked in her husband's antique shop, where she combined her job with writing from 1976.

Sole sold her first novel in 1979 at Robert Hale, and published four novels under the pseudonym of Lynn Granville. She published her first novels as Anne Herries at Mills & Boon, and also wrote at Severn House under this pseudonym and under her real name Linda Sole. She published a novel under the pseudonym of Juliana Linden, and two gothic novels under the pseudonym of Emma Quincey.

Sole and her husband live in Cambridgeshire.

== Bibliography ==
=== As Lynn Granville ===
==== Single novels ====
- The Witch Child (1980)
- Bitter Sweet (1981)
- Dark Blows the Wind (1984)
- Pagan Fires (1984)

=== As Anne Herries ===
==== Single novels ====
- Devil's Kin (1981)
- The Wolf of Alvar (1983)
- Beware the Conqueror (1985)
- Demon's Woman (1985)
- Raphael (1986)
- The Wild Heart (1986)
- The Flame and the Sword (1987)
- The Spanish Witch (1987)
- The Sleeping Demon (1987)
- The Devil's Mercenary (1988)
- For Love and Liberty (1988)
- Rosanna and the Rake (1988)
- The Marriage Chests (1993)
- An Ideal Match (1998)
- Satan's Mark (2000)
- A Matter of Honour (2000)
- The Most Precious Gift (2000)
- Racing Hearts (2000)
- Rosalyn and the Scoundrel (2001)
- Sara's Secret (2001)
- The Abducted Bride (2001)
- A Spanish Practice (2001)
- Captive of the Harem (2002)
- The Sheikh (2002)
- A Damnable Rogue (2003)
- A Wicked Wench (2004)
- Milady's Revenge (2004)
- My Lady, My Love (2005)
- Ransom Bride (2005)
- The Unknown Heir (2008)
- The Homeless Heiress (2008)
- The Rake's Rebellious Lady (2008)
- The Pirate's Willing Captive (2010)
- Bought for the Harem (2011)
- A Stranger's Touch (2012)

==== The Steepwood Scandal Series Multi-Author ====
1. Lord Ravensden's Marriage (2001)
9. Counterfeit Earl (2002)

==== The Elizabethan Season Series Multi-Author ====
2. The Adventurer's Wife (2004)
3. Lady in Waiting (2004)

==== Banewulf Dynasty ====
1. A Perfect Knight (2005)
2. A Knight of Honour (2005) aka A Knight of Honor (US title)
3. Her Knight Protector (2005)

==== English Civil War ====
1. Lovers and Enemies (2005)
2. Love Lies Weeping (2006)
3. The Seeds of Sin (2006)

==== The Hellfire Mysteries ====
1. An Improper Companion (2006)
2. A Wealthy Widow (2006)
3. A Worthy Gentleman (2007)

==== The Horne Sisters ====
1. Marianne and the Marquis (2007)
2. Married By Christmas (2007)
3. Marrying Captain Jack (2007)

==== Upstairs, Downstairs Saga ====
1. Love Is Not Enough (2008)
2. Love and War (2008)
3. Forbidden Love (2008)

==== A Season in Town ====
1. A Country Miss in Hanover Square (2009)
2. An Innocent Debutante in Hanover Square (2009)
3. The Mistress of Hanover Square (2009)

==== Melford Dynasty ====
1. Forbidden Lady (2010)
2. The Lord's Forced Bride (2010)
3. Her Dark and Dangerous Lord (2011)

==== Secrets and Scandals ====
1. The Disappearing Duchess (2011)
2. The Mysterious Lord Marlowe (2012)
3. The Scandalous Lord Lanchester (2012)

=== As Linda Sole ===
==== Single novels ====
- Lovers and Sinners (1990)
- The Last Summer of Innocence (1991)
- Shadow Players (1992)
- All Their Days (1995)
- This Land, This Love (1997)
- Spring Will Come (1997)
- Flame Child (1999)
- Song for Athena (2003)
- A Kind of Loving (2008)
- Cassie's Sheikh (2008)
- Chateau Despair (2009)
- All My Sins (2010)
- Tears Will Not Save Them (2010)

==== Emma Robinson's Story ====
1. The Ties That Bind (2000)
2. The Bonds That Break (2000)
3. The Hearts That Hold (2001)

==== Jenny Heron's Story ====
1. The Rose Arch (2001)
2. A Cornish Rose (2001)
3. A Rose in Winter (2002)

==== London's Girls Saga ====
1. Bridget (2002)
2. Kathy (2004)
3. Amy (2004)

==== Country House Saga ====
1. Give Me Tomorrow (2004)
2. A Bright New Day (2005)
3. Wish Down the Moon (2006)

==== Sarah Beaufort Mysteries ====
1. Miscarriage of Justice (2007)
2. Justice Is Served (2007)
3. A Different Kind of Justice (2008)

==== Family Feud ====
1. The Lie (2008)
2. A Promise Made (2009)
3. Winners and Losers (2009)
4. Briar Patch (2011)

=== As Emma Quincey ===
==== Single novels ====
- Her Mother's Sins (1997)
- Forgotten Sins (1998)

=== As Juliana Linden ===
==== Single novels ====
- In the Name of Honour (1998)
