= Sharon Kendrick =

British writer

- Born: Sharon Wirdnam; Unknown; London, England
- Occupation: Novelist
- Writing career
- Pen name: Sharon Kendrick; Sharon Wirdnam
- Period: 1993–Present
- Genre: Romantic novel
- Website: www.sharonkendrick.com

Sharon Kendrick, née Wirdnam (b. London, England) is a British author of over 100 romance novels published by Mills & Boon since 1993. Her books regularly top the sales charts for romance fiction.

== Early life ==
Sharon Wirdnam was born in London and grew up near Heathrow Airport. She worked as a waitress, a cook, a photographer and a nurse and drove an ambulance across the Australian desert. Kendrick lives and works in Winchester and Plymouth. She has a daughter and a son.

== Career ==
Kendrick's novel The Playboy Sheikh's Virgin Stable Girl'' (2009) was reviewed by Sarah Wendell in 2009 on the blog Smart Bitches, Trashy Books, and described as "so ridiculous, you can't put it down. It is its own drinking game". Wendell wrote later that Kendrick told her "the book has continued to sell marvelously" and that Kendrick had dedicated a book to her.

== Publications ==
=== As Sharon Kendrick ===
==== Single Novels ====
- No Escaping Love (1993)
- Cruel Angel (1993)
- Sweet Madness (1994)
- Potent as Poison (1995)
- Savage Seduction (1995)
- Passionate Fantasy (1995)
- Part-Time Father (1995)
- Taking Risks (1996)
- Taking It All (1996)
- His Baby! (1996)
- Untamed Lover (1996)
- Mistress Material (1996)
- Wait and See (1997)
- That Kind of Man (1997)
- Long-Distance Marriage (1997)
- Make-Over Marriage (1998)
- All the Care in the World (1998)
- The Baby Bond (1998)
- Valentine Vendetta (1999)
- The Final Seduction (1999)
- Her Secret Pregnancy (2000)
- Seduced by the Boss (2000)
- The Paternity Claim (2000)
- The Sicilian's Passion (2001)
- Finn's Pregnant Bride (2002)
- Mistress of La Rioja (2002)
- Back in the Boss's Bed (2003)
- The Greek's Secret Passion (2003)
- The Italian's Love-child (2003)
- The Billionaire Bodyguard (2004)
- Bedded for Revenge (2006)
- Bought by Her Husband (2006)
- The Sheikh's Unwilling Wife (2007)
- The Sheikh's English Bride (2007)
- The Desert King's Virgin Bride (2007)
- Italian Boss, Housekeeper Bride (2007)
- His Majesty's Child (2011)
- The Ruthless Greek's Return (2015)

==== Revenge Is Sweet Series ====
1. Getting Even (1997)
2. Kiss and Tell (1997)
3. Settling the Score (1997)

==== Wanted: One Wedding Dress Required! ====
1. One Bridegroom Required! (1998)
2. One Wedding Required! (1999)
3. One Husband Required! (1999)

==== London's Most Eligible Playboy Series ====
1. The Unlikely Mistress (2001)
2. Surrender to the Sheikh (2001)
3. The Mistress's Child (2001)

==== The Royal House Of Cacciatore Series ====
1. The Mediterranean Prince's Passion (2004)
2. The Prince's Love-Child (2004)
3. The Future King's Bride (2005)

==== Desert Brides Series Multi-Author ====
- The Desert Prince's Mistress (2004)

==== For Love or Money Series Multi-Author ====
- Exposed: The Sheikh's Mistress (2005)

==== The Balfour Brides Multi Author Series ====
- Kat And The Dare-Devil Spaniard (2010)

==== Desert Men Of Quarhah Series ====
- Defiant In The Desert (2013)
- Shamed In The Sands (2014)
- Seduced By The Sultan (2014)

==== One Night With Consequences Series Multi-Author ====
- Carrying the Greek's Heir (2015)
- Crowned for the Prince's Heir (2016)
- Secrets of a Billionaire's Mistress (2017)
- The Pregnant Kavakos Bride (2017)
- The Italian's Christmas Secret (2017)
- Crowned for the Sheikh's Baby (2018)
- The Argentinian's Baby of Scandal (2019)

==== Wedlocked! Series Multi-Author ====
- The Shiek's Bought Wife (2017)

==== Omnibus In Collaboration ====
- Comfort and Joy (1997) (with Lynne Collins, Marion Lennox and Laura MacDonald)
- Christmas Affairs (1998) (with Helen Bianchin and Sandra Marton)
- Bachelors' Babies (2001) (with Lynne Graham and Leigh Michaels)
- Society Weddings (2002) (with Kate Walker)
- Claiming His Mistress (2004) (with Helen Bianchin and Lucy Gordon)
- In the Boss's Bed (2004) (with Liz Fielding and Carole Mortimer)
- Virgin Brides (2005) (with Miranda Lee and Kate Walker)
- In the Sheikh's Bed (2005) (with Michelle Reid and Kate Walker)
- Risque Business (2005) (with Emma Darcy and Liz Fielding)
- Exclusive! (2005) (with Jackie Braun and Fiona Hood-Stewart)
- Millionaires & Mistresses (2006) (with Jackie Braun and Fiona Hood-Stewart)
- Latin Affairs (2006) (with Helen Bianchin and Kathryn Ross)
- Escape to Spanish Seduction (2006) (with Anne Herries)
- Valentine Fantasies: Valentine Vendetta / My Favorite Mistake (2006) (with Stephanie Bond)
- Bedded by Her Boss (2007) (with Amanda Browning and Jessica Steele)
- Secret Passions (2007) (with Amanda Browning and Catherine Spencer)

=== As Sharon Wirdnam ===
==== Single novels ====
- Nurse in the Outback (1988)
- To Break a Doctor's Heart (1989)
- Medical Liaison (1990)
- Specialist in Love (1991)
- Seize the Day (1991)
- Surgeon of the Heart (1992)
- Casualty of Passion (1995)
- Consultant Care (1996)
- The Real Christmas Message (2016)
