= Susan Napier =

New Zealand writer of over 30 romance novels

Susan Napier Potter
- Born: 14 February 1954 (age 72); Auckland, New Zealand
- Occupation: Novelist
- Writing career
- Pen name: Susan Napier
- Period: 1984-Present
- Genre: Romantic novel

Susan Napier (born 14 February 1954 in Auckland, New Zealand) was a popular New Zealand writer of over 30 romance novels in various Mills & Boon category lines since 1984.

== Biography ==
Napier worked as a reporter at the newspaper Auckland Star, where she met her future husband, Chief Reporter Tony Potter. They had two sons, Simon and Ben.

Over 30 of her novels have been published, and they have been translated into a combined 20 languages. Romantic Times has described her work as "multi-layered" with "well-defined characters and a commanding conflict." She has twice been nominated for a Romantic Times Reviewer's Choice Award, in 1996 for Reckless Conduct, and in 1997 for Mistress of the Groom.

== Bibliography ==
=== Single novels ===
- Sweet Vixen, 1984
- Sweet As My Revenge, 1985
- The Counterfeit Secretary, 1986
- The Lonely Season, 1986
- Reasons Of The Heart, 1988
- Another Time, 1989
- The Love Conspiracy, 1990
- Bewitching Compulsion, 1990
- Fortune's Mistress, 1991
- No Reprieve, 1991
- Deal Of A Lifetime, 1992
- Devil To Pay, 1992
- Tempt Me Not, 1993
- The Hawk And The Lamb, 1994
- The Cruellest Lie, 1994
- Phantom Lover, 1994
- Savage Courtship, 1995
- The Sister Swap, 1996
- Breaking/Making Up: Vendetta, 1997
- Mistress of the Groom, 1997
- In Bed With The Boss, 1999
- The Revenge Affair, 1999
- The Mistress Deception, 2000
- Secret Seduction, 2000
- A Passionate Proposition, 2001
- Mistress For A Weekend, 2006
- Accidental Mistress, 2007
- Price of Passion (alternate title Just Once), 2008
- Public Scandal, Private Mistress, 2008

=== The Marlows Series ===
1. Love In The Valley, 1985
2. True Enchanter, 1988
3. Winter of Dreams, 1993
4. A Lesson In Seduction, 1997

=== Year Down Under Series Multi-Author ===
- Secret Admirer, 1993

=== 9 to 5 Series Multi-Author ===
- Reckless Conduct, 1996

=== Do Not Disturb Series Multi-Author ===
- Honeymoon Baby, 1998

== See also ==
- List of romantic novelists
