= Julia James =

Actress

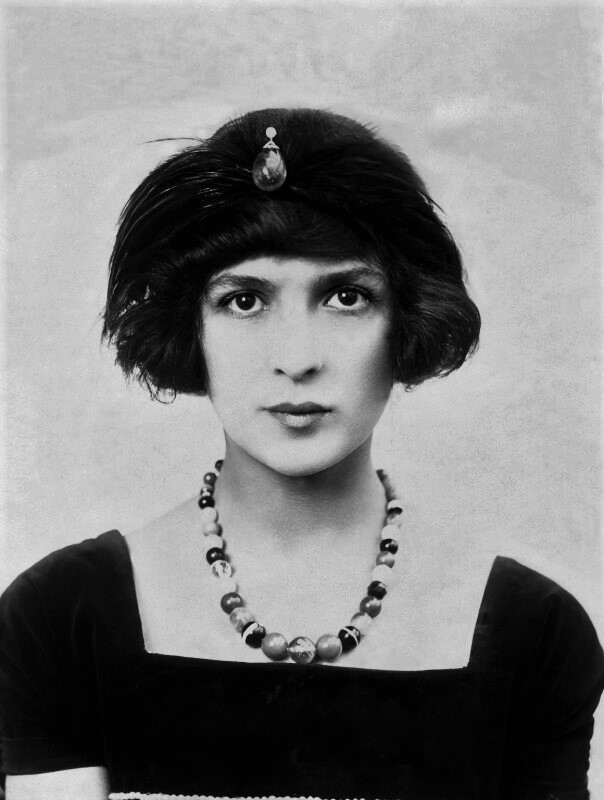
Julia James (1914)

Julia James (1890–1964) was an English actress of the 1900s Edwardian era, the leading lady at the Gaiety Theatre.

== Biography ==
Julia James was born in London in 1890.

In 1905, she began her career in Supper Belle in Blue Bell at the Aldwych Theatre under Seymour Hicks. She was the leading lady at the Gaiety Theatre, appearing in The Girls of Gottenburg, Havana, and Our Miss Gibbs.

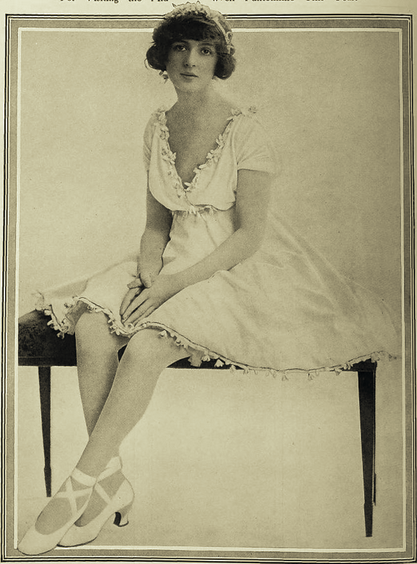
(1914)

In 1913, she had the role of Sombra in The Arcadians at L'Olympia, Paris.

In 1916, she performed at the London Opera House in Christmas in the Trenches.

In 1919, she played as Mabel Mannering in Yes, Uncle!.

She died in 1964, age 74.
