= Penny Jordan =

English novelist (1946–2011)

Penelope "Penny" Halsall
- Born: Penelope Jones; 24 November 1946; Preston, Lancashire, England
- Died: 31 December 2011 (aged 65); Cheshire, England, UK
- Occupation: Novelist
- Spouse: Steve Halsall (died)
- Writing career
- Pen name: Caroline Courtney; Melinda Wright; Lydia Hitchcock; Penny Jordan; Annie Groves
- Period: 1979–2011
- Genres: Contemporary romance, historical romance
- Website: www.penny-jordan.co.uk

Penelope Halsall (née Jones; 24 November 1946 – 31 December 2011) was a prolific English writer of over 200 romance novels. She started writing regency romances as Caroline Courtney, and wrote contemporary romances as Penny Jordan and historical romances as Annie Groves (her mother's maiden name). She also wrote novels as Melinda Wright and Lydia Hitchcock. Her books have sold over 70 million copies worldwide and have been translated into many languages.

== Biography ==
Penelope Jones was born on 24 November 1946 in Preston, Lancashire, the eldest of three children born to Anthony Winn Jones and his wife, Margaret Louise (née Groves), She had a brother, Anthony, and a sister, Prudence. A keen reader from childhood, her mother would leave her in the children's section of the local library while she changed her father's library books. Her story-telling career began at the age of eight when she began telling original bedtime stories to her younger sister. Her favourite books were those of Jane Austen, Dorothy Dunnett, Catherine Cookson, Georgette Heyer, Charles Dickens, William Shakespeare's plays and poetry and the Bible. After reading a serialised Mills & Boon book in a woman's magazine, she fell in love with the hero. Jones was eleven and she quickly became an avid fan. Jones left grammar school in Rochdale with O-Levels in English Language, English Literature and Geography. In her early days, she spent fourteen years working as a shorthand typist in Manchester.

Jones married Steve Halsall, an accountant, who died of cancer, predeceasing her. They did not have children, but she had nieces, nephews and godchildren.

Jordan died of cancer on 31 December 2011, aged 65, in Cheshire, England.

== Writing career ==
By her early twenties, Jordan was writing for herself, but her writing career began in earnest when she was 30, encouraged and supported by her husband. He bought her, at a time when he could ill afford it, the small electric typewriter on which she typed her first books. She entered a competition run by the Romantic Novelists' Association. Although she did not win, an agent looking for a new-style Georgette Heyer, contacted the R.N.A.

In March 1979, she published her first novel under the pseudonym Caroline Courtney, Duchess in Disguise, the same year she published other 4 books. Under this pen-name she published 25 regency romances until 1986. From 1981 to 1983, she signed 3 air-hostess romps as Melinda Wright and 2 thrillers as Lydia Hitchcock, published by Columbine House. In 1981, Mills & Boon accepted her first novel for them, Falcon's Prey, signed as Penny Jordan. Since then, almost 70 million copies of her 167 Mills & Boon (or Harlequin) novels have been sold worldwide.

From 2003, she returned to writing historical novels as Annie Groves (she adopted her mother's maiden-name). Jordan gained much of her inspiration from human interest stories in the news as well as her own family history. She adapted a story told by her grandmother Elsie Jones in Ellie Pride. Across the Mersey by Annie Groves with the subtitle "Two families must face the dangers of war", is dedicated "For all those whose hearts are in Liverpool, no matter where their lives may have taken them".

== Series Works as Annie Groves ==
Pride family

- Ellie Pride (2003)
- Connie's Courage (2004)
- Hettie of Hope Street (2005)

World War II

- A Mother's Blessing (2006) aka Goodnight Sweetheart
- Some Sunny Day (2006)
- The Grafton Girls (2007)
- As Time Goes By (2007)

Campion Family

- Across the Mersey (2008)
- Daughters of Liverpool (2008)
- The Heart of the Family (2009)
- Where the Heart Is (2009)
- When the Lights Go on Again (2010)

Article Row

- London Belles (2010)
- Home for Christmas (2011)
- My Sweet Valentine (2012)
- Only a Mother Knows (2013)
- A Christmas Promise (2013)

Empire Street

- Child of the Mersey (2014)
- Christmas on the Mersey (2014)
- The Mersey Daughter (2017)
- Winter on the Mersey (2017)

District Nurses

- The District Nurses of Victory Walk (2018)
- Wartime for the District Nurses (2019)
- Christmas for the District Nurses (2019)
- A Gift for the District Nurses (2020)
- The District Nurses Make a Wish (2021)

Three sisters

- The Three Sisters of Victory Walk (2022)
- Secrets for the Three Sisters (2024)
