= List of Harlequin Romance novels released in 2002 =

This is a list of Harlequin Romance novels released in 2002. (Main index: List of Harlequin Romance novels)

== Releases ==
Number	Title	Author	Date	Citations
# 3683	The Millionaire's Daughter	Sophie Weston	January 2002	
# 3684	Bride By Choice	Lucy Gordon	January 2002	
# 3685	An Independent Woman	Betty Neels	January 2002	
# 3686	The Substitute Wife	Barbara McMahon	January 2002	
# 3687	The Bridesmaid's Secret	Sophie Weston	February 2002	
# 3688	Assignment: Baby	Jessica Hart	February 2002	
# 3689	The Engagement Effect: An Ordinary Girl	Betty Neels	February 2002	
# 3689	The Engagement Effect: A Perfect Proposal	Liz Fielding	February 2002	
# 3690	Outback Baby	Barbara Hannay	February 2002	
# 3691	Backwards Honeymoon	Leigh Michaels	March 2002	
# 3692	His Personal Agenda	Liz Fielding	March 2002	
# 3693	The Bridegroom's Vow	Rebecca Winters	March 2002	
# 3694	Adopted: Twins!	Marion Lennox	March 2002	
# 3695	His Pretend Mistress	Jessica Steele	April 2002	
# 3696	Marriage On Demand	Susan Fox	April 2002	
# 3697	The Baby Question	Caroline Anderson	April 2002	
# 3698	His Secretary's Secret	Barbara McMahon	April 2002	
# 3699	Emma's Wedding	Betty Neels	May 2002	
# 3700	The Corporate Bridegroom	Liz Fielding	May 2002	
# 3701	Inherited: Twins!	Jessica Hart	May 2002	
# 3702	The Doctors' Baby	Marion Lennox	May 2002	
# 3703	His Majesty's Marriage: The King's Bride	Lucy Gordon	June 2002	
# 3703	His Majesty's Marriage: The Prince's Choice	Rebecca Winters	June 2002	
# 3704	The Marriage Merger	Liz Fielding	June 2002	
# 3705	The Tycoon's Temptation	Renee Roszel	June 2002	
# 3706	The Nanny's Secret	Grace Green	June 2002	
# 3707	Strategy For Marriage	Margaret Way	July 2002	
# 3708	The Tycoon's Takeover	Liz Fielding	July 2002	
# 3709	The Prince's Proposal	Sophie Weston	July 2002	
# 3710	The Baby Dilemma	Rebecca Winters	July 2002	
# 3711	The Boss's Daughter	Leigh Michaels	August 2002	
# 3712	A Convenient Wedding	Lucy Gordon	August 2002	
# 3713	The Honeymoon Prize	Jessica Hart	August 2002	
# 3714	The Pregnancy Plan	Grace Green	August 2002	
# 3715	Mistaken Mistress	Margaret Way	September 2002	
# 3716	The Whirlwind Wedding	Day Leclaire	September 2002	
# 3717	Her Forbidden Bridegroom	Susan Fox	September 2002	
# 3718	Their Doorstep Baby	Barbara Hannay	September 2002	
# 3719	The Fiancé Fix	Carole Mortimer	October 2002	
# 3720	Bride By Design	Leigh Michaels	October 2002	
# 3721	A Professional Marriage	Jessica Steele	October 2002	
# 3722	Baby On Loan	Liz Fielding	October 2002	
# 3723	The Baby Bombshell	Day Leclaire	November 2002	
# 3724	The Bedroom Assignment	Sophie Weston	November 2002	
# 3725	Bridegroom on Her Doorstep	Renee Roszel	November 2002	
# 3726	A Royal Proposition	Marion Lennox	November 2002	
# 3727	Outback Angel	Margaret Way	December 2002	
# 3728	Assignment: Single Man	Caroline Anderson	December 2002	
# 3729	The Tycoon's Proposition	Rebecca Winters	December 2002	
# 3730	The Fortunes Of Francesca	Betty Neels	December 2002	
