= List of Harlequin Romance novels released in 2014 =

This is a list of Harlequin Romance novels released in 2014. (Main index: List of Harlequin Romance novels)

== Releases ==
Number	Title	Author	Date	Identifier	Ref.
#4403	Second Chance with Her Soldier	Barbara Hannay	January, 2014	ISBN 978-1460322857; OCLC 864317685	
#4404	Snowed In with the Billionaire	Caroline Anderson	January, 2014	ISBN 978-1460322864; OCLC 864317686	
#4405	Christmas at the Castle	Marion Lennox	January, 2014	ISBN 978-1460322871; OCLC 864317631	
#4406	Snowflakes and Silver Linings	Cara Colter	January, 2014	ISBN 978-1460322888; OCLC 864317716	
#4407	The Greek's Tiny Miracle	Rebecca Winters	February, 2014	ISBN 978-1460324141; OCLC 901038774	
#4408	The Man Behind the Mask	Barbara Wallace	February, 2014	ISBN 978-0373742738; OCLC 852833237	
#4409	English Girl in New York	Scarlet Wilson	February, 2014	ISBN 978-1460324165; OCLC 864322642	
#4410	The Final Falcon Says I Do	Lucy Gordon	February, 2014	ISBN 978-1460324172; OCLC 864322643	
#4411	Daring to trust the boss	Susan Meier	March, 2014	ISBN 978-0373742769; OCLC 856973087	
#4412	Rescued by the Millionaire	Cara Colter	March, 2014	ISBN 978-1460325728; OCLC 870141107	
#4413	Heiress on the Run	Sophie Pembroke	March, 2014	ISBN 978-1460325735; OCLC 870141060	
#4414	The Summer They Never Forgot	Kandy Shepherd	March, 2014	ISBN 978-1460325742; OCLC 870141111	
#4415	The Returning Hero	Soraya Lane	April, 2014	ISBN 978-1460327449; OCLC 1460327446	
#4416	Road Trip with the Eligible Bachelor	Michelle Douglas	April, 2014	ISBN 978-1460327456; OCLC 865653373	
#4417	Safe in the Tycoon's Arms	Jennifer Faye	April, 2014	ISBN 978-1460327463; OCLC 905661236	
#4418	Awakened By His Touch	Nikki Logan	April, 2014	ISBN 978-1460327470; OCLC 865653569	
#4419	Behind the Film Star's Smile	Kate Hardy	May, 2014	ISBN 978-1460328965; OCLC 883254915	
#4420	Her Soldier Protector	Soraya Lane	May, 2014	ISBN 978-1460328972; OCLC 876040888	
#4421	Stolen Kiss From a Prince	Teresa Carpenter	May, 2014	ISBN 978-1460328989; OCLC 868969425	
#4422	The Return of Mrs. Jones	Jessica Gilmore	May, 2014	ISBN 978-1460328996; OCLC 876039628	
#4423	Expecting the Prince's Baby	Rebecca Winters	June, 2014	ISBN 978-1460331514; OCLC 879289504	
#4424	The Millionaire's Homecoming	Cara Colter	June, 2014	ISBN 978-1460331521; OCLC 879377518	
#4425	The Heir of the Castle	Scarlet Wilson	June, 2014	ISBN 978-1460331538; OCLC 879289509	
#4426	Swept Away by the Tycoon	Barbara Wallace	June, 2014	ISBN 978-1460331545; OCLC 879289537	
#4427	Becoming the Prince's Wife	Rebecca Winters	July, 2014	ISBN 978-1460333310; OCLC 881284442	
#4428	Nine Months to Change His Life	Marion Lennox	July, 2014	ISBN 978-1460333327; OCLC 881281620	
#4429	Taming Her Italian Boss	Fiona Harper	July, 2014	ISBN 978-1472048141; OCLC 1132403851	
#4430	Summer With the Millionaire	Jessica Gilmore	July, 2014	ISBN 978-1460333341; OCLC 881281791	
#4431	Her Irresistible Protector	Michelle Douglas	August, 2014	ISBN 978-1460334904; OCLC 883126672	
#4432	The Maverick Millionaire	Alison Roberts	August, 2014	ISBN 978-1460334911; OCLC 883126673	
#4433	The Return of the Rebel	Jennifer Faye	August, 2014	ISBN 978-1460334928; OCLC 883127008	
#4434	The Tycoon and the Wedding Planner	Kandy Shepherd	August, 2014	ISBN 978-1460334935; OCLC 1546731219	
#4435	The Rebel and the Heiress	Michelle Douglas	September, 2014	ISBN 978-1460336991; OCLC 883262630	
#4436	Not Just a Convenient Marriage	Lucy Gordon	September, 2014	ISBN 978-1460337004; OCLC 883262635	
#4437	A Groom Worth Waiting For	Sophie Pembroke	September, 2014	ISBN 978-1460337011; OCLC 883262636	
#4438	Crown Prince, Pregnant Bride	Kate Hardy	September, 2014	ISBN 978-1460337028; OCLC 883262598	
#4439	Interview with a Tycoon	Cara Colter	October, 2014	ISBN 978-1460338780; OCLC 1543253840	
#4440	Her Boss by Arrangement	Teresa Carpenter	October, 2014	ISBN 978-1460338797; OCLC 1544826762	
#4441	In Her Rival's Arms	Alison Roberts	October, 2014	ISBN 978-1460338803; OCLC 1546732061	
#4442	Frozen Heart, Melting Kiss	Ellie Darkins	October, 2014	ISBN 978-1460338810; OCLC 883313440	
#4443	The Billionaire in Disguise	Soraya Lane	November, 2014	ISBN 978-1460340707; OCLC 883340135	
#4444	The Unexpected Honeymoon	Barbara Wallace	November, 2014	ISBN 978-1460340714; OCLC 883367987	
#4445	A Princess by Christmas	Jennifer Faye	November, 2014	ISBN 978-1460340721; OCLC 883319782	
#4446	His Reluctant Cinderella	Jessica Gilmore	November, 2014	ISBN 978-1460340738; OCLC 883325744	
#4447	The Twelve Dates Of Christmas	Susan Meier	December, 2014	ISBN 978-1460341933; OCLC 883347686	
#4448	At the Chateau for Christmas	Rebecca Winters	December, 2014	ISBN 978-1460341940; OCLC 1544830933	
#4449	A Very Special Holiday Gift	Barbara Hannay	December, 2014	ISBN 978-1460341957; OCLC 883329456	
#4450	A New Year Marriage Proposal	Kate Hardy	December, 2014	ISBN 978-1460341964; OCLC 883330240	

== Sources ==
- "At the Chateau for Christmas". Harlequin Enterprises. December 2014.
- "Awakened By His Touch". Harlequin Enterprises. April 2014.
- "Becoming the Prince's Wife". Harlequin Enterprises. July 2014.
- "Behind the Film Star's Smile". Harlequin Enterprises. May 2014.
- "The Billionaire in Disguise". Harlequin Enterprises. November 2014.
- "Christmas at the Castle". Harlequin Enterprises. January 2014.
- "Crown Prince, Pregnant Bride". Harlequin Enterprises. September 2014.
- "English Girl in New York". Harlequin Enterprises. February 2014.
- "Expecting the Prince's Baby". Harlequin Enterprises. June 2014.
- "The Final Falcon Says I Do". Harlequin Enterprises. February 2014.
- "Frozen Heart, Melting Kiss". Harlequin Enterprises. October 2014.
- "The Greek's Tiny Miracle". Harlequin Enterprises. February 2014.
- "A Groom Worth Waiting For". Harlequin Enterprises. September 2014.
- "The Heir of the Castle". Harlequin Enterprises. June 2014.
- "Heiress on the Run". Harlequin Enterprises. March 2014.
- "Her Boss by Arrangement". Harlequin Enterprises. October 2014.
- "Her Irresistible Protector". Harlequin Enterprises. August 2014.
- "Her Soldier Protector". Harlequin Enterprises. May 2014.
- "In Her Rival's Arms". Harlequin Enterprises. October 2014.
- "His Reluctant Cinderella". Harlequin Enterprises. November 2014.
- "Interview with a Tycoon". Harlequin Enterprises. October 2014.
- "The Man Behind the Mask". Harlequin Enterprises. February 2014.
- "The Maverick Millionaire". Harlequin Enterprises. August 2014.
- "The Millionaire's Homecoming". Harlequin Enterprises. June 2014.
- "A New Year Marriage Proposal". Harlequin Enterprises. December 2014.
- "Nine Months to Change His Life". Harlequin Enterprises. July 2014.
- "Not Just a Convenient Marriage". Harlequin Enterprises. September 2014.
- "A Princess by Christmas". Harlequin Enterprises. November 2014.
- "The Rebel and the Heiress". Harlequin Enterprises. September 2014.
- "Rescued by the Millionaire". Harlequin Enterprises. March 2014.
- "The Return of Mrs. Jones". Harlequin Enterprises. May 2014.
- "The Return of the Rebel". Harlequin Enterprises. August 2014.
- "The Returning Hero". Harlequin Enterprises. April 2014.
- "Road Trip with the Eligible Bachelor". Harlequin Enterprises. April 2014.
- "Safe in the Tycoon's Arms". Harlequin Enterprises. April 2014.
- "Second Chance with Her Soldier". Harlequin Enterprises. January 2014.
- "Snowed In with the Billionaire". Harlequin Enterprises. January 2014.
- "Snowflakes and Silver Linings". Harlequin Enterprises. January 2014.
- "Stolen Kiss From a Prince". Harlequin Enterprises. May 2014.
- "The Summer They Never Forgot". Harlequin Enterprises. March 2014.
- "Swept Away by the Tycoon". Harlequin Enterprises. June 2014.
- "The Tycoon and the Wedding Planner". Harlequin Enterprises. August 2014.
- "The Unexpected Honeymoon". Harlequin Enterprises. November 2014.
- "A Very Special Holiday Gift". Harlequin Enterprises. December 2014.
