= List of Harlequin Romance novels released in 2013 =

This is a list of Harlequin Romance novels released in 2013. (Main index: List of Harlequin Romance novels)

== Releases ==
Number	Title	Author	Date	Identifier	Ref.
#4351	Single Dad's Holiday Wedding	Patricia Thayer	January, 2013	ISBN 9780373178476; OCLC 796757724	
#4352	The Secret That Changed Everything	Lucy Gordon	January, 2013	ISBN 9780373178483; OCLC 796757727	
#4353	Mistletoe Kisses with the Billionaire	Shirley Jump	January, 2013	ISBN 9781459249486; OCLC 823934463	
#4354	Her Outback Rescuer	Marion Lennox	January, 2013	ISBN 9781459249493; OCLC 824358967	
#4355	Baby under the Christmas tree	Teresa Carpenter	January, 2013	ISBN 9781459249509; OCLC 824358928	
#4356	The Nanny Who Saved Christmas	Michelle Douglas	January, 2013	ISBN 9780373178520; OCLC 796757737	
#4357	The Heir's Proposal	Raye Morgan	February, 2013	ISBN 9781460300732; OCLC 826861390	
#4358	The Soldier's Sweetheart	Soraya Lane	February, 2013	ISBN 9780373178544; OCLC 823651172	
#4359	The Billionaire's Fair Lady	Barbara Wallace	February, 2013	ISBN 9781460300756; OCLC 826333838	
#4360	A Bride For The Maverick Millionaire	Marion Lennox	February, 2013	ISBN 9780373178568; OCLC 823635212	
#4361	Shipwrecked with Mr. Wrong	Nikki Logan	February, 2013	ISBN 9781460300770; OCLC 826348923	
#4362	When Chocolate Is Not Enough...	Nina Harrington	February, 2013	ISBN 9781460300787; OCLC 826338677	
#4363	Her Rocky Mountain Protector	Patricia Thayer	March, 2013	ISBN 9781460303702; OCLC 829025806	
#4364	The Billionaire's Baby S.O.S.	Susan Meier	March, 2013	ISBN 9781460303719; OCLC 829027630	
#4365	Baby Out Of The Blue	Rebecca Winters	March, 2013	ISBN 9781460303726; OCLC 829027631	
#4366	Ballroom To Bride And Groom	Kate Hardy	March, 2013	ISBN 9781460303733; OCLC 829952601	
#4367	Guardian To The Heiress	Margaret Way	April, 2013	ISBN 9780373178636; OCLC 810117458	
#4368	Little Cowgirl On His Doorstep	Donna Alward	April, 2013	ISBN 9780373178643; OCLC 810116837	
#4369	Mission: Soldier To Daddy	Soraya Lane	April, 2013	ISBN 9780373178650; OCLC 810117398	
#4370	Winning Back His Wife	Melissa McClone	April, 2013	ISBN 9780373178667; OCLC 810117425	
#4371	Sparks Fly With The Billionaire	Marion Lennox	May, 2013	ISBN 9781460310151; OCLC 838638040	
#4372	A Daddy For Her Sons	Raye Morgan	May, 2013	ISBN 9780373742370; OCLC 816028280	
#4373	Along Came Twins...	Rebecca Winters	May, 2013	ISBN 9780373742387; OCLC 816028281	
#4374	An Accidental Family	Ami Weaver	May, 2013	ISBN 9781460310182; OCLC 839555298	
#4375	A Father For Her Triplets & Her Pregnancy Surprise	Susan Meier	June, 2013	ISBN 9780373742400; OCLC 843169549	
#4376	The Matchmaker's Happy Ending & Boardroom Bride and Groom	Shirley Jump	June, 2013	ISBN 9780373742417; OCLC 819376707	
#4377	Second Chance with the Rebel & Her Royal Wedding Wish	Cara Colter	June, 2013	ISBN 9780373742424; OCLC 843169570	
#4378	First Comes Baby... & The Loner's Guarded Heart	Michelle Douglas	June, 2013	ISBN 9781299394247; OCLC 842852549	
#4379	The Making Of A Princess	Teresa Carpenter	July, 2013	ISBN 9780373742448; OCLC 846854278	
#4380	Marriage For Her Baby	Raye Morgan	July, 2013	ISBN 9780373742455; OCLC 846855042	
#4381	The Man Behind The Pinstripes	Melissa McClone	July, 2013	ISBN 9780373742462; OCLC 1298293366	
#4382	Falling For The Rebel Falcon	Lucy Gordon	July, 2013	ISBN 9781299451056; OCLC 842893026	
#4383	A Cowboy To Come Home To	Donna Alward	August, 2013	ISBN 9780373742486; OCLC 825733713	
#4384	How To Melt A Frozen Heart	Cara Colter	August, 2013	ISBN 9781460315552; OCLC 853449407	
#4385	The Cattleman's Ready-Made Family	Michelle Douglas	August, 2013	ISBN 9780373742509; OCLC 825733725	
#4386	Rancher to the Rescue	Jennifer Faye	August, 2013	ISBN 9781460315576; OCLC 853449344	
#4387	The Cowboy She Couldn't Forget	Patricia Thayer	September, 2013	ISBN 9780373742523; OCLC 828488258	
#4388	A Marriage Made In Italy	Rebecca Winters	September, 2013	ISBN 9780373742530; OCLC 828488264	
#4389	Miracle In Bellaroo Creek	Barbara Hannay	September, 2013	ISBN 9780373742547; OCLC 894322149	
#4390	The Courage To Say Yes	Barbara Wallace	September, 2013	ISBN 9781460316870; OCLC 856525179	
#4391	Bound By A Baby	Kate Hardy	October, 2013	ISBN 9781460318478; OCLC 858876389	
#4392	In The Line Of Duty	Ami Weaver	October, 2013	ISBN 9781460318485; OCLC 858876418	
#4393	Patchwork Family in the Outback	Soraya Lane	October, 2013	ISBN 9781460318492; OCLC 858876361	
#4394	Stranded With The Tycoon	Sophie Pembroke	October, 2013	ISBN 9781460318508; OCLC 858876391	
#4395	Single Dad's Christmas Miracle	Susan Meier	November, 2013	ISBN 9781299759138; OCLC 1150010687	
#4396	Snowbound With The Soldier	Jennifer Faye	November, 2013	ISBN 9780373742615; OCLC 1151238111	
#4397	The Redemption of Rico D'Angelo	Michelle Douglas	November, 2013	ISBN 9781460320013; OCLC 859532035	
#4398	The Christmas Baby Surprise	Shirley Jump	November, 2013	ISBN 9781743645109; OCLC 1148192656	
#4399	Proposal at the Lazy S Ranch	Patricia Thayer	December, 2013	ISBN 9780373742646; OCLC 843856825	
#4400	A Little Bit of Holiday Magic	Melissa McClone	December, 2013	ISBN 9780373742653; OCLC 843856793	
#4401	A Cadence Creek Christmas	Donna Alward	December, 2013	ISBN 9780373742660; OCLC 1148204096	
#4402	Marry Me Under Mistletoe	Rebecca Winters	December, 2013	ISBN 9780373742677; OCLC 843856836	

== Sources ==
- "An Accidental Family". Harlequin Enterprises. May 2013.
- "Along Came Twins..." Harlequin Enterprises. May 2013.
- "Baby out of the Blue". Harlequin Enterprises. March 2013.
- "Baby Under the Christmas Tree". Harlequin Enterprises. January 2013.
- "Ballroom to Bride and Groom". Harlequin Enterprises. March 2013.
- "The Billionaire's Baby S.O.S." Harlequin Enterprises. March 2013.
- "The Billionaire's Fair Lady". Harlequin Enterprises. February 2013.
- "Bound by a Baby". Harlequin Enterprises. October 2013.
- "A Bride for the Maverick Millionaire". Harlequin Enterprises. February 2013.
- "The Cattleman's Ready-Made Family". Harlequin Enterprises. August 2013.
- "The Christmas Baby Surprise". Harlequin Enterprises. November 2013.
- "The Courage To Say Yes". Harlequin Enterprises. September 2013.
- "The Cowboy She Couldn't Forget". Harlequin Enterprises. September 2013.
- "A Daddy for Her Sons". Harlequin Enterprises. May 2013.
- "Falling For The Rebel Falcon". Harlequin Enterprises. July 2013.
- "First Comes Baby..." Harlequin Enterprises. June 2013.
- "Guardian to the Heiress". Harlequin Enterprises. April 2013.
- "The Heir's Proposal". Harlequin Enterprises. February 2013.
- "Her Outback Rescuer". Harlequin Enterprises. January 2013.
- "Her Rocky Mountain Protector". Harlequin Enterprises. March 2013.
- "How to Melt a Frozen Heart". Harlequin Enterprises. August 2013.
- "In the Line of Duty". Harlequin Enterprises. October 2013.
- "The Making of a Princess". Harlequin Enterprises. July 2013.
- "Marriage for Her Baby". Harlequin Enterprises. July 2013.
- "A Marriage Made in Italy". Harlequin Enterprises. September 2013.
- "Marry Me Under Mistletoe". Harlequin Enterprises. December 2013.
- "The Matchmaker's Happy Ending". Harlequin Enterprises. June 2013.
- "Miracle in Bellaroo Creek". Harlequin Enterprises. September 2013.
- "Mistletoe Kisses with the Billionaire". Harlequin Enterprises. January 2013.
- "The Nanny Who Saved Christmas". Harlequin Enterprises. January 2013.
- "Patchwork Family in the Outback". Harlequin Enterprises. October 2013.
- "Proposal at the Lazy S Ranch". Harlequin Enterprises. December 2013.
- "Rancher to the Rescue". Harlequin Enterprises. August 2013.
- "The Redemption of Rico D'Angelo". Harlequin Enterprises. November 2013.
- "Second Chance with the Rebel". Harlequin Enterprises. June 2013.
- "The Secret That Changed Everything". Harlequin Enterprises. January 2013.
- "Shipwrecked with Mr. Wrong". Harlequin Enterprises. February 2013.
- "Single Dad's Holiday Wedding". Harlequin Enterprises. January 2013.
- "Snowbound with the Soldier". Harlequin Enterprises. November 2013.
- "The Soldier's Sweetheart". Harlequin Enterprises. February 2013.
- "Sparks Fly with the Billionaire". Harlequin Enterprises. May 2013.
- "Stranded with the Tycoon". Harlequin Enterprises. October 2013.
- "When Chocolate Is Not Enough..." Harlequin Enterprises. February 2013.
