= Sandra Marton =

American novelist

- Born: US
- Occupation: Novelist
- Children: 1
- Writing career
- Pen name: Sandra Marton
- Period: 1985–present
- Genre: Romance
- Website: www.sandramarton.com

Sandra Marton is an American author of over 86 romance novels in Harlequin Enterprises Ltd since 1985. In 2012, she began writing self-published novels with six titles "The Prince of Pleasure," "Emily: Sex & Sensibility," "Jaimie: Fire & Ice," "Lissa: "Sugar & Spice," "The Gift," and "On the Wilde Side."

== Biography ==
Marton graduated from high school with honours in English and graduated from college in English.

She is married and has a son. She resides in southern New England, United States.

== Bibliography ==
=== Single Novels ===
- Rapture in the Sands (1985)
- From This Day Forward (1985)
- Game of Deceit (1986)
- Out of the Shadows (1986)
- Intimate Strangers (1987)
- Lovescenes (1987)
- Heart of the Hawk (1988)
- A Flood of Sweet Fire (1988)
- Deal with the Devil (1988)
- Cherish the Flame (1988)
- Fly Like an Eagle (1989)
- Eye of the Storm (1989)
- Consenting Adults (1990)
- Nightfires (1990)
- Garden of Eden (1990)
- The Corsican Gambit (1991)
- That Long-ago Summer (1991)
- Roarke's Kingdom (1991)
- A Bride for the Taking (1992)
- No Need for Love (1993)
- Hostage of the Hawk (1994)
- Master of El Corazon (1994)
- Emerald Fire (1995)
- Til Tomorrow (1996)
- The Second Mrs. Adams (1996)
- Until You (1997)
- Mediterranean Moments (2002)
- The Borghese Bride (2003)
- For Love or Money (2003)
- The Sicilian's Christmas Bride (2006)

=== Dreams Series ===
1. By Dreams Betrayed (1990)
2. Lost in a Dream (1991)

=== Landon's Legacy Series ===
1. An Indecent Proposal (1995)
2. Guardian Groom (1995)
3. Hollywood Wedding (1996)
4. Spring Bride (1996)

=== Wedding of the Year! Series ===
1. The Bride Said Never! (1997)
2. The Divorcee Said Yes! (1997)
3. The Groom Said Maybe! (1998)
- Wedding of the Year (Omnibus) (2002) (The Bride Said Never! / The Divorcee Said Yes! / The Groom Said Maybe!)

=== The Romano Series ===
1. The Sexiest Man Alive (1998)
2. Romano's Revenge (2000)

=== The Barons Series ===
1. Marriage on the Edge (1999)
2. More Than a Mistress (1999)
3. Slade Baron's Bride (1999)
4. The Taming of Tyler Kincaid (2000)
5. Mistress of the Sheik (2000)
6. The Alvares Bride (2001)
7. The Pregnant Mistress (2002)
8. Raising the Stakes (2002)

=== The O'Connells Series ===
1. Keir O'Connell's Mistress (2003)
2. The Sicilian Surrender (2003)
3. Claiming His Love-Child (2004)
4. The Sheikh's Convenient Bride (2004)
5. The One-Night Wife (2004)
6. The Sicilian Marriage (2005)

=== Knight Brothers Series ===
1. The Desert Virgin (2006)
2. Captive in His Bed (2006)
3. Naked in His Arms (2006)

=== Billionaires' Brides Series ===
1. The Italian Prince's Pregnant Bride (2007)
2. The Greek Prince's Chosen Wife (2007)
3. The Spanish Prince's Virgin Bride (2007)

=== The Sheikh Tycoons Series ===
1. The Sheikh's Defiant Bride (2008)
2. The Sheikh's Wayward Wife (2008)
3. The Sheikh's Rebellious Mistress (2008)

=== The Orsini Brothers / Orsini Brides Series ===
1. Raffaele: Taming His Tempestuous Virgin (2009)
2. Dante: Claiming His Secret Love-Child (2009)
3. Falco: The Dark Guardian (2010)
4. Nicolo: The powerful Sicilian (2010)
5. The Ice Prince (2011)
6. The Real Rio D'Aquila (2011)

=== A Walk Down the Aisle Series Multi-Author ===
- Yesterday and Forever (1992)

=== Secrets Series Multi-Author ===
- A Woman Accused (1993)

=== Postcards from Europe Multi-Author ===
- Roman Spring (1993)

=== From Here To Paternity Europe Multi-Author ===
- A Proper Wife (1996)

=== Do Not Disturb Series Multi-Author ===
- The Bridal Suite (1998)

=== Passion Series Multi-Author ===
- The Sexiest Man Alive (1998)

=== Valentin Series Multi-Author ===
- The Bedroom Business (2000)

=== Red-Hot Revenge Multi-Author ===
- Cole Cameron's Revenge (2001)

=== Cooper's Corner Series Multi-Author ===
- Dancing in the Dark (2002)

=== Forrester Square Series Multi-Author ===
4. Ring of Deception (2003)

=== The Ramirez Bride Series Multi-Author ===
3. The Disobedient Virgin (2005)

=== The Royal House of Karedes Series Multi-Author ===
- Billionaire Prince, Pregnant Mistress (2009)

=== Collections ===
- Desert Destiny: Sheikh's Revenge, Hostage of the Hawk (1994)
- High Society Grooms (2002)
- Raising the Stakes / The Runaway Mistress (2005)
- Bride Said Never! / Enticing Proposal (2008)

=== Omnibus In Collaboration ===
- Christmas Affairs (1998) (with Helen Bianchin and Sharon Kendrick)
- Desert Heat (1999) (with Emma Darcy and Lynne Graham)
- Amnesia (2000) (with Lee Wilkinson and Rebecca Winters)
- Father and Child (2000) (with Jacqueline Baird and Emma Darcy)
- Married in Spring (2001) (with Stella Cameron and Bobby Hutchinson)
- Nine to Five (2001) (with Kim Lawrence and Cathy Williams)
- Seduced by a Sultan (2004) (with Emma Darcy and Liz Fielding)
- His Boardroom Mistress (2005) (with Helen Bianchin and Cathy Williams)
- Outback Reunion / Disobedient Virgin (2005) (with Bronwyn Jameson)
- Seduced by Christmas (2007) (with Yvonne Lindsay)
- Mothers Wanted (2008) (with Jessica Hart and Marion Lennox)
- Hot City Nights (2008) (with Sarah Mayberry and Emilie Rose)
- His Contract Bride (2009) (with Sara Craven and Day Leclaire)
- Merry Christmas Love (2009) (with Diana Hamilton, Penny Jordan, Jane Porter and Margaret Way)

== References and Resources ==
- Sandra Marton's Official Website
- Sandra Marton's Webpage in Harlequin Enterprises Ltd
- Sandra Marton's Webpage in Fantastic Fiction's Website
