= Sara Craven =

British writer (1938–2017)

Anne Ashurst
- Born: Anne Bushell; October 2nd 1938; Devon, England, United Kingdom
- Died: 15 November 2017 (aged 79)
- Occupations: Journalist, Novelist
- Spouse(s): Mr. Thomas (divorced), Mr. Ashurst (divorced)
- Writing career
- Pen name: Sara Craven
- Period: 1975 – 2017
- Genre: Romantic novel

Anne Ashurst (née Bushell; October 1938 in Devon, England – 15 November 2017), who wrote using the pseudonym Sara Craven, was a British author of over 80 romance novels. Her novels were published by Mills & Boon from 1975. In 2010 she became chairman of the Southern Writers' Conference, and the next year was elected the 26th Chairman (2011–2013) of the Romantic Novelists' Association.

== Biography ==
Anne "Annie" Bushell was born in October 1938 in Devon, England. She worked as journalist at the Paignton Observer, but after her marriage, she moved to the north of England, where she worked as teacher. After she returned to journalism, she joined the Middlesbrough Writers' Group, where she met other romance writer Mildred Grieveson (Anne Mather). She started to write romance. In 1975, she sold her first romance novel to Mills & Boon, under the pseudonym of Sara Craven.

In 1997, she was the overall winner of the final series of the first run of the BBC Television quiz programme Mastermind. That same year, saw her participate as part of a team of Mastermind finalists in a special edition of University Challenge against that show's series champions, Magdalen College, Oxford. She also participated in a special edition of the BBC Radio 4 quiz Masterbrain against Brain of Britain champion Daphne Fowler, losing to Fowler by 20 points.

Divorced twice, she lived in the Midlands town of Rugby in England, but was a regular visitor to New York City, where her twin grandchildren live. Ashurst died on the morning of 15 November 2017.

== Bibliography ==
=== Novels ===
- The Garden of Dreams (1975)
- Gift for a Lion (1977)
- Strange Adventure (1977)
- Temple of the Moon (1977)
- Wild Melody (1977)
- Place of Storms (1977)
- Devil at Archangel (1978)
- Dragon's Lair (1978)
- Past All Forgetting (1978)
- High Tide at Midnight (1978)
- Moth to the Flame (1979)
- Solitaire (1979)
- Flame of Diablo (1979)
- Fugitive Wife (1980)
- Shadow of Desire (1980)
- Moon of Aphrodite (1980)
- Summer of the Raven (1981)
- Witching Hour (1981)
- Dark Summer Dawn (1981)
- Counterfeit Bride (1982)
- Unguarded Moment (1982)
- Pagan Adversary (1983)
- Sup with the Devil (1983)
- Bad Enemy (1983)
- Dark Paradise (1984)
- Act of Betrayal (1985)
- Alien Vengeance (1985)
- Promise of the Unicorn (1985)
- Escape Me Never (1985)
- A High Price to Pay (1986)
- The Marriage Deal (1986)
- Night of the Condor (1987)
- Outsider (1987)
- Witch's Harvest (1987)
- Devil and the Deep Sea (1988)
- Comparative Strangers (1988)
- King of Swords (1988)
- Island of the Heart (1989)
- Flawless (1989)
- Storm Force (1989)
- When the Devil Drives (1991)
- Desperate Measures (1991)
- Dark Ransom (1992)
- Dawn Song (1993)
- Tower of Shadows (1993)
- Dark Apollo (1994)
- Thunder on the Reef (1994)
- One Reckless Night (1997)
- Marriage at a Distance (1998)
- Marriage Under Suspicion (1998)
- Bartaldi's Bride (1999)
- Seduction Game (1999)
- Marriage by Deception (2000)
- Rome's Revenge (2001)
- Smokescreen Marriage (2001)
- In the Millionaire's Possession (2005)
- One Night with His Virgin Mistress (2008)
- Ruthless Awakening (2009)
- The Innocent's Surrender (2010)
- His Untamed Innocent (2010)
- The Highest Stakes of All (2011)
- Wife in the Shadows (2011)
- The End of Her Innocence (2012)
- The Price of Retribution (2012)
- Count Valieri's Prisoner (2013)
- Seduction Never Lies (2014)
- Inherited By Her Enemy (2015)
- The Innocent's Sinful Craving (2015)

=== Forbidden! multi-author series ===
- Deceived (1996)

=== Nanny Wanted! multi-author series ===
- Ultimate Temptation (1997)
- A Nanny for Christmas (1997)

=== Red-Hot Revenge multi-author series ===
1. Irresistible Temptation (1999)

=== Nothing Hill Grooms multi-author series ===
- Mistress on Loan (2000)

=== Greek Tycoons multi-author series ===
- The Tycoon's Mistress (2000)
- His Forbidden Bride (2003)

=== Wedlocked! multi-author series ===
- The Marriage Proposition (2002)
- His Convenient Marriage (2002)
- The Marriage Truce (2002)
- The Token Wife (2003)
- His Wedding Night Heir (2005)
- Wife Against Her Will (2006)
- Bride of Desire (2006)
- The Forced Bride (2007)

=== Italian Husbands multi-author series ===
- The Forced Marriage (2002)
- The Marchese's Love-Child (2004)
- The Count's Blackmail Bargain (2005)

=== Foreign Affairs multi-author series ===
- The Bedroom Barter (2003)

=== Mistress To A Millionaire multi-author series ===
- Mistress at a Price (2004)

=== Ruthless multi-author series ===
- Innocent On Her Wedding Night (2007)

=== Innocent Mistress, Virgin Bride multi-author series ===
- The Virgin's Wedding Night (2008)

=== Forced to Marry multi-author series ===
- The Santangeli Marriage (2008)

=== Collections ===
- The Sara Craven Duet (1993)

=== Omnibus in collaboration ===
- Marriage of Convenience: Marrying Game, Marriage Deal (1995) (with Lindsay Armstrong)
- Passion with a Vengeance (1998) (with Jacqueline Baird and Emma Darcy)
- Hot Latin Lovers (2003) (with Michelle Reid and Sophie Weston)
- Passion in Paradise (2004) (with Jacqueline Baird and Cathy Williams)
- Greek Millionaires (2004) (with Penny Jordan and Anne McAllister)
- A Christmas Engagement (2004) (with Jessica Matthews and Margaret Way)
- Dark Seductions (2005) (with Robyn Donald and Anne Mather)
- The Italian's Pleasure (2006) (with Diana Hamilton and Carol Marinelli)
- His Virgin Lover (2006) (with Sandra Field and Susan Napier)
- Escape to Greek Affairs (2006) (with Margaret Mayo)
- Sweet Revenge (2006) (with Emma Darcy and Kim Lawrence)
- Blind-Date Grooms (2007) (with Emma Darcy and Jessica Hart)
- His Bride on His Terms (2008) (with Jacqueline Baird and Carole Mortimer)
- Raw Silk / Dark Apollo / Dark Fire (2008) (with Robyn Donald and Anne Mather)
- Paper Marriages (2008) (with Jacqueline Baird and Sara Wood)
- To Claim His Mistress (2008) (with Alison Fraser and Kay Thorpe)
- Blackmailed by the Rich Man (2008) (with Julia James and Lucy Monroe)
- The Italian's Love-Child (2009) (with Emma Darcy and Diana Hamilton)
- His Contract Bride (2009) (with Day Leclaire and Sandra Marton)
- His Wife, His Revenge (2009) (with Lynne Graham and Lucy Monroe)
- His Independent Bride (2010) (with Maggie Cox and Catherine Spencer)
- The Right Bride? (2010) (with Sandra Field and Jessica Steele)
- After Hours: Boardroom Bargains (2010) (with Kelly Hunter and Carol Marinelli)
