= India Grey =

British writer

- Born: England, United Kingdom
- Occupation: Novelist
- Spouse: yes
- Children: 3
- Writing career
- Pen name: India Grey
- Language: English
- Period: 2006-Present
- Genre: Romantic novel
- Notable awards: RoNA Award
- Website: indiagrey.com

India Grey (b. England) is a British writer of romance novels since 2006. In 2009, her novel Mistress: Hired for the Billionaire's Pleasure won the Love Story of the Year by the Romantic Novelists' Association.

== Biography ==
India Grey was born in England, United Kingdom, she studied English and Literature at Manchester University. Married, she has three daughters. After meeting the bestselling novelist Penny Jordan, she returned to writing romance, and sold her first novel in September 2006.

== Bibliography ==
=== Single novels ===
- The Italian's Captive Virgin (2006) a.k.a. Angelo's Captive Virgin
- The Italian's Defiant Mistress (2007)
- Mistress: Hired for the Billionaire's Pleasure (2007)
- Taken for Revenge, Bedded for Pleasure (2008)
- At the Argentinean Billionaire's Bidding (2009)
- Spanish Aristocrat, Forced Bride (2009) a.k.a. The Society Wife
- Powerful Italian, Penniless Housekeeper (2009)
- Her Last Night of Innocence (2010) a.k.a. The Secret She Can't Hide

=== The Fitzroy Legacy Series ===
1. Craving the Forbidden (2011)
2. In Bed with a Stranger (2011)
- Wicked Secrets (Craving the Forbidden / In Bed with a Stranger) (2012)

=== The Balfour Legacy Series a.k.a. The Balfour Brides Series ===
3. Emily's Innocence (2010) a.k.a. Emily and the Notorious Prince

=== Omnibus ===
- Champagne Summer (At the Argentinean Billionaire's Bidding / Powerful Italian, Penniless Housekeeper) (2012)

=== Anthologies in collaboration ===
- One Night in... Milan (The Italian's Future Bride / The Italian's Chosen Wife / The Italian's Captive Virgin) (2011) (with Michelle Reid and Kate Hewitt)
- Latin Lovers: Italian Playboys (Bought For the Marriage Bed / The Italian GP's Bride / The Italian's Defiant Mistress) (2011) (with Melanie Milburne and Kate Hardy)
- Loving Our Heroes (Last-Minute Proposal / Mission: Mountain Rescue / Mistress: Hired for the Billionaire's Pleasure) (2011) (with Jessica Hart and Amy Andrews)
- Secrets (One Night In His Arms / Taken for Revenge, Bedded for Pleasure) (2012) (with Penny Jordan)
- Hot Nights With the Spaniard (Bedded for the Spaniard's Pleasure / Spanish Aristocrat Forced Bride / Spanish Magnate Red-Hot Revenge) (2012) (with Carole Mortimer and Lynn Raye Harris)
