= Catherine Spencer =

Catherine Spencer may refer to:

- Catherine Spencer (novelist)
- Catherine Spencer (rugby union)
