= Sara Wood (novelist) =

British writer

- Born: 1941 (age 84–85); England, UK
- Occupation: Novelist
- Spouse: 2
- Children: 2
- Writing career
- Pen name: Sara Wood
- Period: 1986–2004
- Genre: Romantic novel

Sara Wood (b. 1941 in England) was a popular British writer of 49 romance novels in Mills & Boon from 1986 to 2004.

== Biography ==
Sara Wood was born in 1941 in the south of England. Her family were poor. She trained as a secretary but married at 21. She and her husband had two sons. The marriage did not last, and after divorcing, she trained as a teacher. She married again. After seeing the romantic novelist Charlotte Lamb interviewed on television, she decided to become a novelist herself. "But she'd rarely read fiction before, so she bought 20 books, analyzed them carefully, then wrote one of her own. Amazingly, it was accepted and she began writing full time." Wood lives in Sussex.

== Bibliography ==
=== Single Novels ===
- Perfumes of Arabia (1986)
- Passion's Daughter (1986)
- Pure Temptation (1987)
- Wicked Invader (1987)
- The Count's Vendetta (1988)
- Savage Hunger (1988)
- No Gentle Loving (1988)
- Tender Persuasion (1988)
- Love Not Dishonour (1989)
- Master of Cashel (1989)
- Threat of Possession (1989)
- Desert Hostage (1990)
- Nights of Destiny (1990)
- Sicilian Vengeance (1990)
- Cloak of Darkness (1991)
- Dark Forces (1992)
- The Vengeful Groom (1994)
- The Seduction Trap (1997)
- Temporary Parents (1998)
- A Husband's Vendetta (1999)
- The Innocent Mistress (1999)
- A Spanish Revenge (2000)

=== Destiny Trilogy ===
1. Tangled Destinies (1994)
2. Unchained Destinies (1994)
3. Threads of Destiny (1994)

=== True Colours Trilogy ===
1. White Lies (1996)
2. Scarlet Lady (1996)
3. Amber's Wedding (1996)

=== Euromance Multi-Author Series ===
- Mask of Deception (1993)

=== Postcards from Europe Multi-Author Series ===
- Mask of Deception (1993)

=== Too Hot to Handle Multi-Author Series ===
- Southern Passions (1993)

=== Dangerous Liaisons Multi-Author Series ===
- Shades of Sin (1993)

=== Island Dreams Multi-Author Series ===
- The Dark Edge of Love (1994)

=== Mediterranean Passions Multi-Author Series ===
- In the Heat of Passion (1994)

=== Wedlocked! Multi-Author Series ===
- Second-Best Bride (1995)
- Husband by Arrangement (2003)

=== Family Secrets Multi-Author Series ===
- A Forbidden Seduction (1995)

=== Expecting! Multi-Author Series ===
- Expectant Mistress (1998)
- For the Babies' Sakes (2002)

=== Society Weddings Multi-Author Series ===
- The Impatient Groom (1999)

=== His Baby Multi-Author Series ===
- Morgan's Secret Son (2001)

=== Greek Tycoons Multi-Author Series ===
- The Kyriakis Baby (2001)
- The Greek Millionaire's Marriage (2004)

=== Mistress to a Millionaire Multi-Author Series ===
- The Unexpected Mistress (2001)
- In the Billionaire's Bed (2003)

=== Italian Husbands Multi-Author Series ===
- The Italian's Demand (2002)

=== Brides of Convenience Multi-Author Series ===
- A Convenient Wife (2003)

=== Red-Hot Revenge Multi-Author Series ===
- A Passionate Revenge (2004)

=== Blackmail Brides Multi-Author Series ===
- The Italian Count's Command (2004)

=== Anthologies in Collaboration ===
- Her Greek Millionaire (2005) (with Helen Bianchin and Helen Brooks)
- Billionaire Grooms (2006) (with Emma Darcy and Leigh Michaels)
- Twins Come Too! (2006) (with Jessica Hart and Marion Lennox)
- Escape to Italian Idylls (2006) (with Diana Hamilton)
- The Sweetest Revenge (2007) (with Anne Mather and Susan Stephens)
- Sinful Secrets (2007) (with Catherine George and Miranda Lee)
- Paper Marriages (2008) (with Jacqueline Baird and Sara Craven)
- In the Greek's Bed (2008) (with Margaret Barker and Kim Lawrence)
- At Her Latin Lover's Command (2009) (with Fiona Hood-Stewart and Susan Stephens)

== See also ==
- List of women writers
- Annalee Blysse
- Laurelin Paige
