= Anne Mather =

British novelist (born 1936)

Mildred Grieveson
- Born: 10 October 1936 (age 89); England, United Kingdom
- Occupation: Novelist
- Children: 2
- Writing career
- Pen name: Anne Mather, Caroline Fleming, Cardine Fleming
- Period: 1965–present
- Genre: Romance
- Notable work: Leopard in the Snow

Anne Mather is the pseudonym used by Mildred Grieveson (born 10 October 1936 in England, United Kingdom), a popular British author of over 160 romance novels. She also signed novels as Caroline Fleming and Cardine Fleming.

Mildred Grieveson began to write down stories in her childhood years. The first novel that she actually finished, Caroline (1965), was also her first book to be published. Her novel, Leopard in the Snow (1974), was developed into a 1978 film.

== Biography ==
=== Personal life ===
Mildred Grieveson was born on 10 October 1946 in England. She always wanted to write, and for years she wrote for her own pleasure. She had written all through her infant and junior years and on into her teens, the stories changing from children's adventures to torrid gypsy passions. Her mother used to gather these up from time to time, when her bedroom became too untidy, and disposed of these manuscripts.

Mildred married very young and became a housewife. Her husband suggested that she ought to send one of her stories to a publisher, but she had never finished one of her stories. Published at 19, she was newly married, and her daughter was just a baby, when she juggled her household chores and scribbled away in exercise books every chance she got. Now, she has two adult children, a son and a daughter, and two grandchildren, Abigail and Ben.

=== Writing career ===
With her husband's encouragement, she finally finished a manuscript, Caroline. When she was only 19, in 1965, Mills & Boon published Caroline, and this became her first published book, signed under the pseudonym Anne Mather.

"In fact her first five books were first published in hardback by Robert Hale Ltd, London although Mills & Boon later published these in paperback.

The first novel to be issued entirely through M&B was Dangerous Enchantment in May 1969. (ref. Fantastic Fiction website)."

In 1973, she became a launch author for the new Harlequin Presents line of category romance novels. Harlequin Presents books were more sensual than the previous line, Harlequin Romance, under which Anne Mather had been published. She was chosen to be a launch author because she, along with Violet Winspear and Anne Hampson were the most popular and prolific of Harlequin's authors.

Her novel, Leopard in the Snow (1974), was developed into a 1978 movie.

== Selected works ==
=== As Anne Mather ===
==== Single Novels ====
- Caroline (1965)
- Design for Loving (1966) = Seen by Candlelight (1971)
- Beloved Stranger (1966) = Legacy of the Past (1973)
- Masquerade (1966)
- Arrogance of Love (1968)
- Enchanted Island (1969) = The Innocent Invader (1974)
- Dangerous Enchantment (1969)
- Dangerous Rhapsody (1969)
- Legend of Lexandros (1969)
- Tangled Tapestry (1969)
- Who Rides the Tiger (1970)
- Lord of Zaracus (1970)
- Sweet Revenge (1970)
- Moon Witch (1970)
- Arrogant Duke (1970)
- Master of Falcon's Head (1970)
- Charlotte's Hurricane (1970)
- Pleasure and the Pain (1971)
- Reluctant Governess (1971)
- Storm in a Rain Barrel (1971)
- Sanchez Tradition (1971)
- High Valley (1971)
- Living with Adam (1972)
- Distant Sound of Thunder (1972)
- The Autumn of the Witch (1972)
- Dark Enemy (1972)
- Monkshood (1972)
- Prelude to Enchantment (1972)
- Night of the Bulls (1972)
- No Gentle Possession (1973)
- The Shrouded Web (1973)
- Jake Howard's Wife (1973)
- Mask of Scars (1973)
- White Rose of Winter (1973)
- Chase a Green Shadow (1973)
- Savage Beauty (1973)
- Waterfalls of the Moon (1973)
- Leopard in the Snow (1974)
- Silver Fruit Upon Silver Trees (1974)
- Rachel Trevellyan (1974)
- Dark Moonless Night (1974)
- Witchstone (1974)
- Japanese Screen (1974)
- Dark Venetian (1975)
- Pale Dawn, Dark Sunset (1975)
- Country of the Falcon (1975)
- Dark Castle (1975)
- Take What You Want (1975)
- Come the Vintage (1975)
- For the Love of Sara (1975)
- Forbidden (1976) = Forbidden Love (1981)
- Come Running (1976)
- Valley Deep, Mountain High (1976)
- Beware the Beast (1976)
- Devil's Mount (1976)
- The Smouldering Flame (1976)
- Wild Enchantress (1976)
- Alien Wife (1976)
- The Medici Lover (1977)
- A Trial Marriage (1977)
- Born Out of Love (1977)
- Charade in Winter (1977)
- The Devil in Velvet (1977)
- Loren's baby (1978)
- Rooted in Dishonour (1978)
- Scorpions' Dance (1978)
- Proud Harvest (1978)
- Follow Thy Desire (1978)
- Captive Destiny (1978)
- Fallen Angel (1978)
- Hell or High Water (1979)
- The Judas Trap (1979)
- Lure of Eagles (1979)
- Melting Fire (1979)
- Apollo's Seed (1979)
- Images of Love (1980)
- Sandstorm (1980)
- Spirit of Atlantis (1980)
- Whisper of Darkness (1980)
- Castles of Sand (1981)
- A Haunting Compulsion (1981)
- Innocent Obsession (1981)
- Duelling Fire (1981)
- Forbidden Flame (1981)
- Edge of Temptation (1982)
- Smokescreen (1982)
- Stormspell (1982)
- Season of Mists (1982)
- Passionate Affair (1982)
- Impetuous Masquerade (1982)
- Green Lightning (1983)
- Sirocco (1983)
- An Elusive Desire (1983)
- Cage of Shadows (1983)
- Wild Concerto (1983)
- Moondrift (1984)
- Act of Possession (1985)
- Hidden in the Flame (1985)
- Stolen Summer (1985)
- Pale Orchid (1985)
- An All Consuming Passion (1985)
- Longest Pleasure (1986)
- Night Heat (1987)
- Burning Inheritance (1987)
- Trial of Innocence (1988)
- Dark Mosaic (1989)
- A Fever in the Blood (1989)
- A Relative Betrayal (1990)
- Indiscretion (1990)
- Blind Passion (1991)
- Such Sweet Poison (1991)
- Betrayed (1991)
- Diamond Fire (1991)
- Dangerous Sanctuary (1992)
- Guilty (1992)
- Tidewater Seduction (1992)
- Rich as Sin (1992)
- A Secret Rebellion (1993)
- Snowfire (1993)
- Tender Assault (1993)
- Strange Intimacy (1994)
- Brittle Bondage (1994)
- Raw Silk (1994)
- Treacherous Longings (1995)
- A Woman of Passion (1995)
- Relative Sins (1996)
- Wicked Caprice (1996)
- Dangerous Temptation (1997)
- Dishonourable Intent (1997)
- Long Nights Loving (1997)
- Shattered Illusions (1997)
- Sinful Pleasures (1998)
- Pacific Heat (1998)
- Morgan's Child (1998)
- Her Guilty Secret (1999)
- The Baby Gambit (1999)
- A Trial of Marriage (1999)
- Innocent Sins (2000)
- Savage Innocence (2001)
- A Rich Man's Touch (2001)
- Hot Pursuit (2002)
- Innocence Betrayed (2006) This novel includes Her Guilty Secret (1999) & Innocent Sins (2000)
- Stay Through The Night (2006)
- The Pregnancy Affair (2007)
- The Greek Tycoon's Pregnant Wife (2007)
- Bedded for the Italian's Pleasure (2007)
- The Brazilian Millionaire's Love-Child (2009) aka The Brazilian's Love-Child
- His Forbidden Passion (2009)
- Innocent Virgin, Wild Surrender (2010)

==== Greek Tycoons Series Multi-Author ====
- The Millionaire's Virgin (2000)
- All the Fire (1971) = His Virgin Mistress (2002) These are not the same book, although the Male main character in both books have the same first & last name, and the female main character in both books have the same first name.

==== Passion Series Multi-Author ====
- All Night Long (2000)
- Sinful Truths (2003)
- The Forbidden Mistress (2004)
- Savage Awakening (2005)

==== Latin Lovers Series Multi-Author ====
- The Spaniard's Seduction (2002)
- Alejandro's Revenge (2003)
- Mendez's Mistress (2008)

==== Foreign Affairs Series Multi-Author ====
- Pacific Passions (2002) (with Robyn Donald)
- Foreign Affairs (2004) (with Helen Bianchin and Michelle Reid)
- In the Italian's Bed (2004)
- The Rodrigues Pregnancy (2004)
- Sleeping with a Stranger (2005)
- The Virgin's Seduction (2006)

==== Wedlocked! Series Multi-Author ====
- Jack Riordan's Baby (2006)

==== Collections ====
- Best of Anne Mather: Fallen Angel; Follow Thy Desire (1983)
- The Best of Anne Mather: Sandstorm; Images of Love (1984)
- Anne Mather Collection: Rich as Sin; Tidewater Seduction; Snowfire (1996)
- Rich as sin; Snowfire; Tidewater seduction (2002)
- Strange Intimacy / Treacherous Longings (2004)
- Relative Sins / Wicked Caprice (2005)
- Spaniard's Seduction / Rich Man's Touch (2008)

==== Omnibus in collaboration ====
- Masquerade by Anne Mather / Rata Flowers Are Red by Mary Moore (author) / Unknown Mr. Brown by Sara Seale (1977)
- A Match for Mom (1997) (Guilty by Anne Mather / A man for mon Linda Randall Wisdom / The fix-it man by Vicki Lewis Thompson)
- Seduction Guaranteed (2000) (with Michelle Reid and Miranda Lee)
- Wed Again! (2001) (They're Wed Again! by Penny Jordan / Anne Mather / The Man She'll Marry by Carole Mortimer)
- Exotic Heat (2002) (Anne Mather, Sandra Field and Sharon Kendrick)
- Mediterranean Playboys (2004) (Michelle Reid, Anne Mather and Jane Porter)
- The Tycoon's Love Child (2005) (Jacqueline Baird, Anne Mather and Robyn Donald)
- Dark Seductions (2005) (Raw Silk by Anne Mather / Dark Apollo by Sara Craven / Dark Fire by Robyn Donald)
- More Than a Mistress (2006) (Claiming His Mistress by Emma Darcy / His Virgin Mistress by Anne Mather / Mistress On His Terms by Catherine Spencer)
- Latin Lovers (2006) (Anne Mather, Kay Thorpe and Michelle Reid)
- The Sweetest Revenge (2007) (Anne Mather, Sara Wood and Susan Stephens)
- Raw Silk / Dark Apollo / Dark Fire (2008) (with Sara Craven and Robyn Donald)
- Pacific Heat / Surrender to Seduction (2008) (with Robyn Donald)

=== As Caroline Fleming ===
(Books reedited as Anne Mather)

==== Single Novels ====
- Dark Venetian (1969/11)
