= Flora Kidd =

British-Canadian writer

Flora Mildred Cartwright Kidd
- Born: Flora Mildred Cartwright; 1926; Liverpool, England, UK
- Died: 19 March 2008 (aged 81–82); Saint John, New Brunswick, Canada
- Occupation: Novelist
- Spouse: Robert Kidd
- Children: 4
- Writing career
- Pen name: Flora Kidd
- Language: English
- Period: 1966–2000
- Genre: Romance novel

Flora Kidd, née Cartwright (1926 in Liverpool, England – 19 March 2008 in Saint John, New Brunswick, Canada) was a British-Canadian popular writer of over 70 romance novels in Mills & Boon from 1966 to 2000.

== Biography ==
Born Flora Mildred Cartwright in 1926 in Liverpool, England, UK. In 1949, she graduated at the Liverpool University, where she met Robert Kidd, her husband, with whom she had four children: Richard, Patricia, Peter and David.

The Kidds moved to Scotland, where Flora began teaching. There, she wrote her first novel, which was published in 1966. She continued to write while their children grew.

In 1977, the Kidd family moved to Saint John, New Brunswick, Canada.

== Book Notes ==
Flora Kidd's debut novel Visit to Rowanbank (1966) is set in a first person narrative, and is indicative of the historical development of this genre by the Mills & Boon publishing house since all subsequent romance novels published by the series have been written in third person narratives. A critical year for switch from first to third person can be traced to the year 1968 through an example of a collection of Isobel Chace novels, harlequin omnibus 7, where The Saffron Sky (1967) and A Handful of Silver (1968) were both written in first person narratives, while the last novel The Damask Rose (1968) switched to a third person narrative.

Scotland and its surroundings are a mainstay of Flora Kidd's stories in the beginning of her writing career.

She realistically exploits her time spent in Scotland in stories that are full of local color describing customs, manners and re-creating dialects. For example, Whistle and I'll Come (1967), My Heart Remembers (1971) and Stranger in the Glen (1974).

Whistle and I'll Come (1967) is an homage to Scotland's national poet Robert Burns. 'Whistle my Love and I'll Come Down' is a Scottish love ballad that predated Robert Burns and was refined by the latter into a wistful song. Flora Kidd adapts this popular song into a romantic novel. The following stanza from Robert Burns' song is introduced in the beginning of her story.

'O whistle, an' I'll come to ye, my lad;

O whistle, an' I'll come to ye, my lad:

Though father and mither should baith gae mad,

O whistle, an' I'll come to ye, my lad. ^{Robert Burns}

Like her 1967 release Whistle and I'll Come, she sets up the hero and the heroine of When Birds Do Sing (1970) against the theme of John Keats' poem "La Belle Dame sans Merci" ("The Beautiful Lady without Pity"). Although "La Belle Dame sans Merci" opens with a description of the knight in a barren landscape, "haggard" and "woe-begone", it is the heroine Lindsay in When Birds Do Sing (1970) who shares such sentiment. Unlike the conclusion of the first stanza of Keats' poem, Flora Kidd's story has a happy ending where birds do sing.

O what can ail thee, knight at arms,

Alone and palely loitering?

The sedge has wither'd from the lake,

And no birds sing. ^{John Keats}

My Heart Remembers (1971) is a title borrowed from Robert Louis Stevenson's poem To S.R. Crockett written in Valimia, which is also mentioned in the story. Sally from little seaside town of Portbride, Scotland finds her sib, a local expression best defined as soul-mate, in Ross since both share in the communion with surrounding moorland:

Blows the wind to-day, and the sun and the rain are flying,

Blows the wind on the moors to-day and now,

Where about the graves of the martyrs the whaups are crying,

My heart remembers how! ^{Robert Louis Stevenson}

The Legend of the Swans (1973) is based on one of many Highland folklores, where a pair of swans return to the loch. The swans have come back after being away for three hundred years. Then the chief of the Macneal clan was the master of the glen where the loch belonged. Like the current master Captain Will Fox, he was a soldier, too. He brought a young bride with him from the South. But she was often lonely. One day she disappeared. She went south when the swans flew south. The glen has been cursed ever since. However, the curse is lifted when history repeats itself once more as Gina arrives in the glen with Will.

Her love for the Scottish highlands is evident in the warmth of the characters depicted in Stranger in the Glen (1974). Here the arrival of Duncan coincides in Jan's imagination of the long-awaited return of a local hero whose last descendant, a young man, emigrated to Australia.

Flora Kidd inevitably uses various other locations for her stories. However, Scotland remains a sentimental favorite. For example, her 1979 novel Stay Through the Night set on the other side of Atlantic in the Caribbean, contains an episode in which the main protagonists are back in Scotland.

The plots for Gallant's Fancy (1974) and Enchantment in Blue (1976) also take off in the Caribbean Islands, indicating a period of writing that took Flora Kidd to the location of her novels. "Gallant's Fancy" (1974) presents an interesting anecdote to the 'typing pool' where all aspiring working girls were relegated at one time or another. A job offer in far away Caribbean seemed to the heroine a chance to break from the routine.

The Canadian Affair (1979) shows Flora Kidd in her transition mode from Scotland to Canada.

== Bibliography ==
=== Single Novels ===
- Visit to Rowanbank (1966) also known as Nurse at Rowanbank (1967)
- Jinx Ranch (1966)
- Love Alters Not (1967)
- Whistle and I'll come (1967)
- Strange as a Dream (1968)
- Wind So Gay (1968)
- When Birds Do Sing (1970)
- The Dazzle on the Sea (1971)
- My Heart Remembers (1971)
- Love Is Fire (1971)
- Remedy for Love (1972)
- Cave of the White Rose (1972)
- Taming of Lisa (1972)
- Beyond the Sunset (1973)
- Night on the Mountain (1973)
- If Love Be Love (1973)
- The Legend of the Swans (1973)
- If Love Be Blind (1973)
- Gallant's Fancy (1974)
- Paper Marriage (1974)
- Enchantment in blue (1975)
- Stranger in the Glen (1975)
- The Bargain Bride (1976)
- The Dance of Courtship (1976)
- The Summer Wife (1976)
- The Black Knight (1976)
- Jungle of Desire (1977)
- Night of the Yellow Moon (1977)
- Dangerous Pretence (1977)
- To Play With Fire (1977)
- Sweet Torment (1978)
- Castle of Temptation (1978)
- Marriage in Mexico (1978)
- Canadian Affair (1979)
- Passionate Encounter (1979)
- Tangled Shadows (1979)
- Together Again (1979)
- Stay Through the Night (1979)
- Arranged Marriage (1980)
- Silken Bond (1980)
- Wife by Contract (1980)
- Passionate Stranger (1981)
- Beyond Control (1981)
- Personal Affair (1981)
- Bride for a Captain (1981)
- Meeting at Midnight (1981)
- Between Pride and Passion (1982)
- Make Believe Marriage (1982)
- Tempted to Love (1982)
- Serenade Pour Anne (1983)
- Dark Seduction (1983)
- Tropical Tempest (1983)
- Dangerous Encounter (1983)
- Passionate Pursuit (1984)
- Desperate Desire (1984)
- Open Marriage (1984)
- Flight to Passion (1984)
- Secret Pleasure (1985)
- Arrogant Lover (1985)
- Passionate Choice (1986)
- The Married Lovers (1986)
- Masquerade Marriage (1987)
- Beloved Deceiver (1987)
- When Lovers Meet (1987)
- The Loving Gamble (1988)
- A Risky Affair (1989)
- The Twenty-Third Man (1997)

=== Marco Polo Series ===
1. To Hell or Melbourne (1994)
2. Until We Meet Again (1998)
3. Restless Spirits (2000)

=== Collections ===
- Love Is Fire / Remedy for Love / The Legend of the Swans (1983)

=== Omnibus in Collaboration ===
- Make Way For Tomorrow / My Heart Remembers / The Blue Mountains of Kabuta (1975) (with Gloria Bevan and Hilary Wilde)
- Spirit Sun / Shadow of the Past / Beyond the Sunset (1977) (with Dorothy Cork and Monica Douglas)
- Stranger in the Glen / The Man at Kambala / Lord of the Sierras (1978) (with Kay Thorpe and Anne Weale)

== References and Resources ==
- Harlequin Enterprises Ltd's Website
