= Cathy Williams =

British writer (born 1957)

- Born: 1953 (age 72–73); Trinidad and Tobago, West Indies
- Occupation: Novelist
- Writing career
- Pen name: Cathy Williams
- Period: 1990–present
- Genre: Romantic novel

Cathy Williams (born 1957 in Trinidad and Tobago) is a British writer of romance novels in Mills & Boon since 1990.

== Biography ==
Cathy Williams was born in 1957 in Trinidad and Tobago in the West Indies. She lives in Chiswick, London, England, with her three daughters; Charlotte, Olivia and the youngest, Emma, who studied Engineering at Cambridge University while working as a freelance photographer.

== Bibliography ==
=== Single novels ===
- A Powerful Attraction (1990)
- Caribbean Desire (1991)
- Shadow Heart (1991)
- Charade of the Heart (1992)
- A French Encounter (1992)
- Naive Awakening (1992)
- Too Scared to Love (1993)
- Bittersweet Love (1993)
- Shadows of Yesterday (1994)
- A Thorn in Paradise (1994)
- Unwilling Surrender (1994)
- A Burning Passion (1994)
- Beyond All Reason (1995)
- Vengeful Seduction (1995)
- The Price of Deceit (1995)
- To Tame a Proud Heart (1996)
- A Suitable Mistress (1996)
- A Natural Mother (1997)
- Accidental Mistress (1997)
- Willing to Wed (1997)
- The Unmarried Husband (1998)
- Sleeping with the Boss (1998)
- A Daughter for Christmas (1998)
- Wife for Hire (1999)
- The Baby Verdict (1999)
- A Scandalous Engagement (2000)
- The Baby Scandal (2000)
- The Boss's Proposal (2001)
- Merger by Matrimony (2001)
- Secretary on Demand (2001)
- The Rich Man's Mistress (2002)
- Riccardo's Secret Child (2002)
- The Millionaire's Revenge (2002)
- Constantinou's Mistress (2002)
- His Convenient Mistress (2003)
- The Greek Tycoon's Secret Child (2003)
- His Virgin Secretary (2004)
- The Italian Tycoon's Mistress (2004)
- The Billionaire Boss's Bride (2004)
- In the Banker's Bed (2005)
- The Greek's Forbidden Bride (2005)
- At the Italian's Command (2005)
- The Italian's Pregnant Mistress (2005)
- At the Greek Tycoon's Bidding (2006)
- At The Greek Tycoon's Pleasure (2006)
- The Italian Boss's Secretary Mistress (2006)
- Kept by the Spanish Billionaire (2007)
- The Italian Billionaire's Secret Love-Child (2007)
- Rafael's Suitable Bride (2008)
- Ruthless Tycoon, Inexperienced Mistress (2009)
- The Italian's One-Night Love-Child (2009)
- Powerful Boss, Prim Miss Jones (2010)
- The Secretary's Scandalous Secret (2010)
- Her Impossible Boss (2011)
- One Night in Rome (2011)
- The Truth Behind his Touch (2012)
- The Girl He'd Overlooked (2012)
- A Tempestuous Temptation (2012)
- The Secret Casella Baby (2013)
- A Deal with Di Capua (2013)
- His Temporary Mistress (2013)
- Secrets of a Ruthless Tycoon (2014)
- The Argentinian's Demand (2014)
- The Uncompromising Italian (2014)
- The Real Romero (2015)
- At Her Boss's Pleasure (2015)
- A Pawn in the Playboy's Game (2015)
- The Wedding Night Debt (2015)
- Seduced into Her Boss's Service (2016)
- A Virgin For Vasquez (2016)
- Snowbound With His Innocent Temptation (2016)
- Bought to Wear the Billionaire's Ring (2017)
- The Secret Sanchez Heir (2017)
- Cipriani's Innocent Captive (2017)
- Legacy Of His Revenge (2017)
- A Deal For Her Innocence (2018)
- A Diamond Deal With Her Boss (2018)
- The Tycoon's Ultimate Conquest (2018)
- Contracted for the Spaniard's Heir (2019)
- Marriage Bargain With His Innocent (2019)
- The Italian's Christmas Proposition (2019)
- His Secretary's Nine-Month Notice (2020)
- The Forbidden Cabrera Brother (2020)

=== Italian Titans ===
1. Wearing The De Angelis Ring (2015)
2. The Surprise De Angelis Baby (2016)

=== Bachelor Tycoons series ===
- A Reluctant Wife (1998)

=== Omnibus in collaboration ===
- His Secretary Bride (2000) (with Kim Lawrence)
- Marriages by Arrangement (2000) (with Diana Hamilton and Anne Weale)
- Nine to Five (2001) (with Kim Lawrence and Sandra Marton)
- Caribbean Caress (2002) (with Catherine Spencer)
- Passion in Paradise (2004) (with Jacqueline Baird and Sara Craven)
- Secrets and Sins... Revealed! / From Lust to Love (2005) (with Miranda Lee)
- Falling for the Boss (2005) (with Helen Brooks and Barbara McMahon)
- His Boardroom Mistress (2005) (with Helen Bianchin and Sandra Marton)
- Love in the City (2005) (with Miranda Lee and Anne McAllister)
- Her Nine Month Miracle (2005) (with Barbara Hannay and Marion Lennox)
- Their Secret Child (2006) (with Kim Lawrence and Jane Porter)
- Red-Hot Revenge (2006) (with Jacqueline Baird and Lee Wilkinson)
- Millionaire's Mistress (2006) (with Jacqueline Baird and Lynne Graham)
- The Tycoon's Virgin (2007) (with Daphne Clair and Sandra Field)
- His Convenient Woman (2007) (with Diana Hamilton and Barbara McMahon)
