= Kay Thorpe =

British writer (born 1935)

- Born: 1935 (age 90–91); England, United Kingdom
- Occupation: Novelist
- Spouse: Tony
- Writing career
- Period: 1968–2006
- Genre: Romantic novel

Kay Thorpe (born 1935) is a British author of 77 romance novels, now totalling over 21 million copies sold. She published her novels in Mills & Boon in 1968. All her novels have also been published under Harlequin Enterprises Limited. Over a period of four decades, she has produced a body of sensuous work that investigates heritage, family, class and love. Her forte is to encode the opposing reading within the classic Harlequin plot. A synopsis of the author that accompanies her publications notes that she researched the market for romance fiction before electing to write in this category. Her first book published in North America established her reputation as a gifted storyteller. She has a strong vital writing style.

As her career graph began in the late 1960s, Kay Thorpe, along with Charlotte Lamb and others, was one of the first writers to explore the boundaries of sexual desire, her novels often reflecting the forefront of the "sexual revolution" of the 1970s. As such she was also one of the first to create a modern romantic heroine: independent, imperfect, and perfectly capable of initiating a sexual or romantic relationship. However, under Kay Thorpe's expert analysis, the modern romantic heroine had to re-evaluate her age-old perceptions of what constituted love and marriage: she had to accept love unconditionally without looking for security in marriage.

== Biography ==
Kay Thorpe was born in 1935 in England. After leaving school, she tried a variety of jobs, including dental nursing and a spell in the Women's Royal Air Force.

In 1960, Kay was married to Tony, and five years later they had a son John. Now, she and her husband live on the outskirts of Chesterfield in Derbyshire.

Her very first completed manuscript accepted, The Last of the Mallorys, was published in 1968. Since then she has written another 76 books.

== A word about the author ==
Sometimes Kay Thorpe finds she has become two different people: the writer at her happiest when involved in the world of books and authors; and the housewife, turning her hands to the everyday needs of husband and son. Once in a while, she finds it difficult to step from one role to the other. She likes cooking, for instance, but she finds that it can be an irritating interruption when she's preoccupied with work on a novel, so the quality of her efforts in the kitchen tend to be a little erratic. She says, "As my husband once remarked, my writing gives life a fascinating element of uncertainty: one day a perfect coq au vin, the next day a couple of burned chops!"

Luckily Kay has daily professional help with her housework, and that leaves her time to indulge in her hobbies. Like many other Harlequin authors, she admits to being a voracious consumer of books, a quality she shares with her readers. She likes music and horseback riding, which she does in the countryside near her home. But her favorite hobby is travel - especially to places that will make good settings for her books.

== Book notes I ==
=== Places and people ===
Kay Thorpe's stories are rich in details covering a diverse background.

Unlike Flora Kidd and Robyn Donald, who showcase Scotland and New Zealand in their stories, Kay Thorpe gives her readers a taste for a myriad of locations. By and large, her stories are based on three locations, namely England, Canada and Africa. There are also stories based in Spain, Italy, South America, Greek Islands, Caribbean Islands, South Pacific Islands and Australia.

Her main characters always stand by their British heritage. As a result, stories set outside England have an underlying subplot that explore how a newcomer from Britain can come to accept making a home for herself with one of the long-time British descendants settled in Canada or South Africa. For example, Safari South (1976), Timber Boss (1978) and Copper Lake (1981).

In Storm Passage (1977) and Time out of Mind (1987), there is mention of how islands in the South Pacific and in the Caribbean came to be under private ownership by a British descendant.

In Timber Boss (1978), there are references as to how Scottish settlers made the Canadian region of Nova Scotia their new home.

Keith in Safari South (1976) appreciates the expansiveness of South Africa and the promising future the country offers him. While Keir in Temporary Marriage (1981) founds his fortunes as an engineering whiz in Sydney, Australia halfway around the world from his native English village.

British engineers working in remote locations of hot and steamy Sierra Leone, the deserts of Libya, or the outback of Tanzania make up the scenery for The Iron Man (1974), The Man from Tripoli (1979), and No Passing Fancy (1980).

In The Man at Kambala (1973) readers experience Masai Mara Reserve in Kenya. In Safari South (1976), they are taken to the Kruger National Park.

The class division in British society provides the conflict for the love affair in Temporary Marriage (1981). Mention of public vs private schools, manner born, Irish vs English blood, cockney vs upper-class accents that indicate subtleties in class background make their way into her stories from the very first The Last of the Mallorys (1968) to other stories down the years such as No Passing Fancy (1980), A Man of Means (1983), and Win or Lose (1986).

After man-woman relation, father-daughter and brother-sister relations take second place in many of her stories. While The Man at Kambala (1973) and No Passing Fancy (1980) have affectionate fathers indulging their daughters, the fathers in A Man of Means (1983) and The Land of the Incas (1983) prove self-serving.

In Safari South (1976), Keith and Karen rekindle their sibling affections after years of being apart. While in Opportune Marriage (1969), the young woman realizes with a pang that her even younger brother is coming into his own and doesn't need her as before.

As Lisa looks ahead to her stay in the family home as Kyle's wife in Time Out of Mind (1987), she considers the difficult personality of Kyle's mother as well as his brother. Kyle reassures Lisa that both mother and son can find alternative residences to stay. But Kyle's sentiment shifts in favor of his sister, which prompts him to mock Lisa, "Will Madalyn be a problem?".

Kay Thorpe also takes a stab at the role of the mother, especially when mothers are relatively young compared to their daughters. In Never Trust a Stranger (1983) a forty-something lead actress Emily worries that casting her daughter Gemma in the same Broadway production with herself may bring out the advances in her age. The mother-daughter relationship becomes more poignant when Gemma accuses Logan of being a past lover of her mother. Although Logan denies the charge, there is no denying that the mother in Floodtide (1981) solicits sex from her son-in-law, which he declines albeit politely giving her the benefit of the doubt as needing for herself a full-blooded affair. Somewhere in her books Kay Thorpe throws in that British men think nothing much of their middle-aged wives, who still yearn for the love and romance of their not so far away youth.

In The Iron Man (1974), Dave says that all wives are kept women. Dave's statement notwithstanding, Kay brings to life predatory women who elect to live off men. In This Side of Paradise (1979), Marie travels to a Caribbean resort with the purpose of securing for herself a moneyed man. In Bitter Alliance (1978) and in Never Trust a Stranger (1983), there are women who marry for money. Nonetheless, these women, promiscuous as their case is, are strong individuals who play by their own rules. A charismatic Ailsa in Full Circle (1978), knowing that her looks will not support her in the long run, has a Swiss bank account to fall back on for her olden days.

Neil Davids, in This Side of Paradise (1979), says that there are women and there are women, some you use and some you cherish. If Kay showcases two types of women, one who is trading in security for love, and the other who is trading in love for money, she also brings about two competing urges in men, one who is looking for a life partner, and the other who is ready to walk away from a woman without a backward glance. As Liam in Bitter Alliance (1978), and Cal in Wilderness Trail (1978) grapple with movements in their own lives that test them with these two faces of women, Logan in Never Trust a Stranger (1983) must decide if marriage is meant for him. Although the romance series is designed to win the hearts of women, it is up to Kay's heroines to convince and to win over the hearts of these men so to propel them to make a choice in their favor.

Theater is a backdrop Kay Thorpe takes up in several of her novels over ensuing decades. For example, Devon Interlude (1968), Curtain Call (1971), Never Trust a Stranger (1983) and The Land of Illusion (1988). In Never Trust a Stranger (1983), it is Logan's use of the word role that clues in would-be actress Gemma to who he is, a theater producer.

In Full Circle (1978), Sara, in an unsteady galley kitchen, dishes out a savory coq au vin albeit with too much wine, which still draws Steve's complement. This story along with others such as Not Wanted on Voyage (1972), and Storm Passage (1977) opens a window to life aboard oceangoing watercraft, be it in a ketch powered by sails or in an ice-breaking whaling ship.

She also uses the sport of horse show jumping in Rising Star (1969), the circus world in Sawdust Season (1972), Corporate takeover in Dividing Line (1979), the international game of snooker in Win or Lose (1986), professional writing in This Side of Paradise (1979) and Skin Deep (1989), professional sculpting in Floodtide (1981), restoration of historical homes in Opportune Marriage (1969).

Interwoven in the love stories, there are these varied interests shared by the main protagonists that lend a richness to the quality of the plots and educate the readers no less.

=== Love and marriage ===
Kay Thorpe explores many factors contributing to successful male-female intimate relationship, love and finally marriage and her writer's voice comes across strongly in each of her novels.

Her narratives give the hero many advantages over the heroine, a trait found in stories of other renowned series novelists such as Flora Kidd, Charlotte Lamb, Robyn Donald just to name a few. However, the harlequin readers anticipate resistance from their heroine until the man confesses his undying love for her. An emotionally secured heroine can, in turn, confess her love for the man.

Kay Thorpe's women, on the other hand, confess their love to men without first securing for themselves any safety net, emotional or otherwise. In such one-sided confessions, the women commit to staying with these men, willing to pay any price and to go with them just anywhere. For example, The Iron Man (1974), Bitter Alliance (1978), and Temporary Marriage (1981).

In Olive Island (1972) Nikos Alexandros explains to Nickey that she will never be happy if the man does not dominate her. Nickey comes back smartly saying that British women are not as accommodating as Greek women. Jaime in Bitter Alliance (1978), on the other hand, admits to the dominant streak in Liam. But in the wake of her first admission comes a second one that Liam would love her like no other man can. This admission does not readily surface in Kay's other heroines. Therefore, the primary struggle is to fight against it. Ramon observes in Apple in Eden (1973) that a woman constantly baits the man, riling him on purpose; this is all but an attempt to meet up with her match in a man, who then wins her submission.

In Safari South (1976), Brad is let down by Karen's answer to the question of compatibility between a man and a woman. Karen believes that she has to like what he likes and he has to like what she does. Brad counters that by saying what about personal likings and individual freedom? In This Side of Paradise (1979), Ryan responds to the same query by saying if two people are of the same mind, then one becomes superfluous, Gina's tentative answer to which is that one can agree to disagree.

Men, as sexual drivers, are the quickest to recognize the significance of sexual compatibility so to use it like a mantra over and over in Kay Thorpe's stories that as long as the couple is sexually compatible it is a foundation from which they can build on. For example, in The Man From Tripoli (1979), Bryn expresses this sentiment to bolster up a simple marriage of convenience.

Hence, the consensus that Kay establishes across her stories is that without sexual compatibility, there is no man-woman association to begin with. However, Steve in Full Circle (1978) tells Sara that a man can have sex with a woman with no strings attached. Therefore, for such an association to mature into any kind of relationship, women have to realize their own sexual potential to the fullest. Cynicism notwithstanding, Nick in Storm Passage (1977) tells Tara that it is not enough that she makes herself available but that she needs to be all woman in order to let their sexual chemistry work for the benefit of their marriage.

As in the matching libido found between Jaime and Liam in Bitter Alliance (1978), when men find their own libido matching with that of the women, only then the relationship promises to be a lasting one. An older Annette in Sawdust Season (1972) tells young Toni that men are not the marrying type; that they only choose to do so when they find a woman whom they can't get out of their skin.

Towards this end, Ross in Dividing Line (1979) tells Kerry that what she perceives as love is mostly made up of sexual attraction. Ross would not be appealing to Kerry if he couldn't arouse her sexually. While Dave in Win or Lose (1986) tells Sara that she is there with him to get laid, Dave in Iron Man (1974) accuses Kim of not confusing that kind of feeling with love. This reciprocal exchange of sexual needs places both men and women on an equal plane.

However, Steve in Full Circle (1978) also tells Sara that a vast majority of women cannot have sex with men without being emotionally attached. This perception is not always forthcoming in all of Kay's male protagonists. And so, Kim in Iron Man (1974) rebuts Dave's accusation with her reply that wanting is part of loving for her kind of women.

A drawback to women as emotional drivers is when they focus on security so that love becomes just another mean to this basic end. That men take an exception to this is clear from Ross in Dividing Line (1979), who confirms to Kerry that the latter wants to hold off sex until she has a ring on her finger and their signature on a paper.

Since men can compartmentalize sexual love and respond to women who most match their libido and women hedge their sexual response to men over emotional attachment and security, the two sexes arrive at cross purposes with each other. In Storm Passage (1977), Nick voices just such a frustration to Tara who he says doesn't even recognize this difference.

A lack of understanding of the divergent currents driving men and women easily transpire into mistrust so much so that in The Man from Tripoli (1979), despite the security blanket provided by her marriage, Lisa elects to leave Bryn because, without marital fidelity, she finds sexual love unconvincing. Sexual jealousy, albeit of her own sister, sows mistrust in Lyn's relationship with Andreas in Dangerous Moonlight (1985).

In Curtain Call (1971), Ryan tells Kerry that for men a career would suffice whereas women want a home and a family. Therefore, Kay's men don't see the point in marriage unless it lasts. While proposing marriage to Gemma in Never Trust a Stranger (1983), Logan wants to convince himself that he can stay in it indefinitely and as such can't help but talk only about himself: Gemma doesn't bore him, she doesn't fill the place with clutter, to which Gemma secretly smiles thinking to herself that just give her time.

The married men in Kay's stories show steadfastness in their commitment and no amount of ambivalence from their wives can shake them out of the will to make the marriage work. For example, in Remember This Stranger (1973), the wife, suffering from amnesia, refuses to accept the man as her husband despite all evidence pointing to this fact. The man, suffering from rejection, refuses to give up on her.

However, keeping with the assertion made in Full Circle (1978) that a man's spontaneous attraction to a woman does not come with strings attached, Bryn, in The Man from Tripoli (1979), doesn't apologise to Lisa for flirting with other women. And Dave, in The Iron Man (1974), answers Kim's question of marital infidelity with a question of his own that if another woman takes undue interest in him, then what is she doing about it? Kay weaves this complexity into the couple's relationship to counter the paranoia she finds in women of jumping to suspect their partners of infidelity.

In an opposite situation when Brad in Opportune Marriage (1969) suspects Lisa of infidelity, he confronts her directly but his emotions go flat when he asks whether she is in love. This is in keeping with another assertion made in Full Circle (1978) that vast majority of women cannot commit to a sexual relationship without some emotional attachment. In Full Circle (1978), the couple's marriage falls apart when Steve is unable to tolerate Sara's infidelity on the basis that sex aside, she must have been emotionally attached to the other man.

Lisa in Opportune Marriage (1969) acknowledges that she was emotionally unfaithful to her husband if not sexually. She went to this other man for friendship that meant gentleness, tenderness and kindness, which for her construed an emotional cocoon. As Brad in Opportune Marriage (1969) says for everything that he was not. While Brad realizes what was lacking in him, Sara convinces Steve in Full Circle (1978) that her past indiscretion was an attempt at stark revenge for which she had no emotional attachment and that she reserved her deep love for him only.

Having established a marital relationship on the basis of sexual compatibility and fidelity, the couple's personal knowledge of each other's virtues and vices come only with time. Soon after their marriage In Dangerous Moonlight (1985), Andreas asks Lyn that she doesn't really know him, does she? Although she is mortified by this discovery, he is unperturbed. Lyn finally realizes that she has all the years ahead of her to find out the answer to his query.

To Sara's assertion in Full Circle (1978) that men are at their most vulnerable in the aftermath of sexual intercourse, a more experienced Ailsa tells her that men even then know what make them tick. It is In No Passing Fancy (1980) that a father advises his daughter, who demands more alone-time with her husband, saying that a man's career is his pride, and so not to get him away from it. A failure in career constitutes actual vulnerability in men.

In Full Circle (1978), we learn that when a man is sick, depressed, or faces a setback in his career, is also when the woman can penetrate into his ego. And more than anyone else, a woman in the role of his wife, who knows the man from the inside, has the upper hand to witness him at his most vulnerable and then use the knowledge to her advantage.

Kay charts the progress of desire, from curiosity to intimacy, and then writes about how sexual chemistry can blossom into tenderness, which she reveals in Floodtide (1981) is love.

Although Kay makes her heroines accept love for its own sake as an unconditional emotion, the result is not humiliation but empowerment as the men reciprocate with sensitivity and depth. Here, Kay appreciates the fact that emotive words don't come easily to most men. Therefore, in Timber Boss (1978), and in Bitter Alliance (1978) after women have made their confessions of love, men contribute to it with cryptic but pregnant remarks such as there is no going back and don't say any more to seal their relationship.

As strong-willed women submit to even stronger willed men, happiness follows.

== Book Notes II ==
=== Temporary marriage (1981) ===
Temporary Marriage (1981) is a Kay Thorpe classic. Regan and Keir are such meaningful names where the name Regan, stands out with pride like its namesake and Keir, an outlandish name suits someone who does something outlandish, coveting a girl beyond his social periphery and then turning hurt pride into zeal and determination.

Regan and Keir's story does not finish with the first curtain close. They come together in a second act. But the ghost of the first one lies between them. To exorcise this ghost, they both act on impulses reaching impromptu decisions that voice deeply held sentiments, which they push out at the time from any detailed analysis.

The pretext of marriage gives them the form needed to communicate at a level other than the one using clinical words. This is sexual love where unalloyed emotions bring out the affirmatives which are intellectually negated. And so this form of love opens up a window to their Will.

And what comes by way of a rescue: a sudden crystallization of emotions. The pent up emotions wandering in the recesses and henceforth stamped out by reasonable means find a sudden release. In an outburst of emotions, the accompanying words flow in a torrent. However, the delivery is still negative in charge. But the negativity is so shrill and brittle in texture, that this time a true listener could hear the affirmation even when the words deny it.

And so, it is for the listener to validate the affirmative sentiment behind the negative words. A true listener, then, is one who shares in the deep sentiment. This is a test for the listener as well, since if he/she didn't share, then the words would ring out empty and full of negative discord, and not resonate with affirming emotions.

For both the speaker and the listener, there is selfishness in this emotion.

The Man at Kambala (1973), The Iron Man (1974) and Sugar Cane Harvest (1975) also use this motif as the story's climax point.

== Bibliography ==
=== Single novels ===
- The Last of the Mallorys (1968)
- Devon Interlude (1968)
- Opportune Marriage (1969)
- Rising Star (1969)
- Curtain Call (1971)
- Not Wanted on Voyage (1972)
- Sawdust Season (1972)
- Man in a Box (1972)
- Olive Island (1972)
- Remember This Stranger (1973)
- Apple in Eden (1973)
- Man at Kambala (1973)
- Iron Man (1974)
- The Shifting Sands (1975)
- Sugar Cane Harvest (1975)
- Royal Affair (1976)
- Caribbean Encounter (1976)
- Safari South (1976)
- River Lord (1977)
- Storm Passage (1977)
- Lord of La Pampa (1977)
- Timber Boss (1978)
- Wilderness Trail (1978)
- Full Circle (1978)
- Bitter Alliance (1978)
- Man from Tripoli (1979)
- This Side of Paradise (1979)
- Dividing Line (1979)
- Chance Meeting (1980)
- No Passing Fancy (1980)
- Copper Lake (1981)
- Floodtide (1981)
- Temporary Marriage (1981)
- New Owner (1982)
- Man of Means (1982)
- The Land of the Incas (1983)
- Never Trust a Stranger (1983)
- Master of Morley (1983)
- The Inheritance (1984)
- No Gentle Persuasion (1985)
- Double Deception (1985)
- No Gentleman Persuasion (1985)
- South Seas Affair (1985)
- Dangerous Moonlight (1985)
- Win or Lose (1986)
- Jungle Island (1986)
- Time Out of Mind (1987)
- Land of Illusion (1988)
- Tokyo Tryst (1988)
- Skin Deep (1989)
- Steel Tiger (1989)
- Intimate Deception (1990)
- Against All Odds (1990)
- Night of Error (1990)
- Trouble on Tour (1991)
- Wild Streak (1991)
- Lasting Legacy (1991)
- The Alpha Man (1992)
- Past All Reason (1992)
- Left in Trust (1992)
- The Spanish Connection (1993)
- Worlds Apart (1994)
- Trial in the Sun (1994)
- The Wedding Deception (1995)
- The Rancher's Mistress (1997)
- All Male (1997)
- Contract Wife (1998)
- The Thirty-Day Seduction (1998)
- Virgin Mistress (1999)
- A Mistress Worth Marrying (2000)
- Bride on Demand (2000)
- The Italian Match (2001)
- A Reckless Attraction (2002)
- Mother and Mistress (2003)
- The Billion-Dollar Bride (2004)
- Bought by a Billionaire (2005)

=== Engagement of Convenience Series ===
- Mistress to a Bachelor (2002)

=== Latin Lovers Series Multi-Author ===
- The South American's Wife (2004)

=== Omnibus in collaboration ===
- Wayaway / The Way Through the Valley / Not Wanted on Voyage (1977) (with Dorothy Cork and Jean S. MacLeod)
- Stranger in the Glen / The Man At Kambala / Lord of the Sierras (1978) (with Flora Kidd and Anne Weale)
- Dolphin Bay / Festival Summer / Safari South (1981) (with Gloria Bevan and Charlotte Lamb)
- The Shifting Sands / Portrait of Jaime / Touched by Fire (1982) (with Jane Donnelly and Margaret Way)
- Villa Faustino / Girl At Dane's Dyke / Sugar Cane Harvest (1982) (with Katrina Britt and Margaret Rome)
- Rising River / Tree of Promise / The River Lord (1985) (with Linden Grierson and Juliet Shore)
- Latin Lovers (2006) (with Anne Mather and Michelle Reid)
- The Innocence Collection (2007) (with Penny Jordan and Carole Mortimer)

== References and resources ==
- Curtain Call by Kay Thorpe
- Kay Thorpe Collection in French
- Harlequin Enterprises Ltd
