= Jenny Haddon =

British writer

- Born: 1933 (age 92–93); London, England
- Occupation: Novelist
- Writing career
- Pen name: Sophie Weston, Sophie Page
- Period: 1975–present
- Genre: Romantic novel
- Website: jennyhaddon.com

Jenny Haddon (born 1933 in London, England) is a British writer of over 45 romance novels for Mills & Boon, who writes as Sophie Weston and Sophie Page. She is also a member of the Committee of the U.K.'s Romantic Novelists' Association (R.N.A.), and was elected its twenty-third Chair (2005–2007).

== Biography ==
Haddon was born in 1933 at London, England. She studied English Language and Literature at university. She worked as consultant at the Bank of England.

Haddon published romantic novels since under the pseudonym Sophie Weston. She is an active member of the Romantic Novelists' Association's Committee, and was elected its twenty-third Chair from 2005 to 2007.

Haddon lives in her house with one cat and innumerous books..

== Bibliography ==
=== As Sophie Weston ===
==== Single novels ====
- Beware the Huntsman (1975)
- Goblin Court (1976)
- Wife to Charles (1977)
- Unexpected Hazard (1978)
- An Undefended City (1979)
- Tomorrow Starts at Midnight (1980)
- Loving Persuader (1982)
- No Man's Possession (1985)
- Executive Lady (1985)
- A Stranger's Touch (1985)
- Like Enemies (1986)
- Shadow Princess (1986)
- Yesterday's Mirror (1986)
- Beyond Ransom (1986)
- Challenge (1987)
- A Matter of Feeling (1989)
- Gypsy in the Night (1991)
- No Provocation (1992)
- Habit of Command (1992)
- Dance with Me (1992)
- Deceptive Passion (1993)
- Triumph of the Dawn (1994)
- Ice at Heart (1994)
- Saving the Devil (1994)
- The Wedding Effect (1995)
- Deception (1996)
- Avoiding Mr.Right (1996)
- The Innocent and the Playboy (1997)
- Catching Katie (1998)
- The Latin Affair (1999)
- The Sheikh's Bride (2000)
- More Than a Millionaire (2001)
- The Englishman's Bride (2001)
- The Prince's Proposal (2002)
- The Bedroom Assignment (2002)
- In the Arms of the Sheikh (2005)
- The Cinderella Factor (2006)
- Red Hot Lover (2016)

==== The Notting Hill Grooms Trilogy Multi-Author ====
3. The Millionaire Affair (1999)

==== Bride Doll Series Multi-Author ====
- Midnight Wedding (2000)

==== The Carew Stepsisters Series ====
1. The Millionaire's Daughter (2001)
2. The Bridesmaid's Secret (2001)

==== The Wedding Challenge Trilogy ====
1. The Independent Bride (2003)
2. The Accidental Mistress (2003)
3. The Duke's Proposal (2004)

==== Omnibus in Collaboration ====
- Sycamore Song / Autumn Concerto / Beware the Huntsman (1980) (with Elizabeth Hunter and Rebecca Stratton)
- Once Bitten, Twice Shy / Love's Sting / The Wedding Effect (1996) (with Catherine Spencer)
- Desert Desires (2002) (with Barbara McMahon)
- Hot Latin Lovers (2003) (with Sara Craven and Michelle Reid)

=== As Sophie Page ===
==== Single novels ====
- To Marry a Prince (2011)
