= Barbara McMahon =

American novelist

- Education: University of California, Berkeley
- Occupation: Novelist
- Writing career
- Pen name: Barbara McMahon
- Period: 1984–present
- Genre: Romantic novel
- Website: www.barbaramcmahon.com

Barbara McMahon is an American writer of over 100 romance novels published by Harlequin Enterprises Ltd and Indie Published since 1984.

== Biography ==
Barbara McMahon grew up in northern Virginia. Later her family moved to California, where she transferred to the University of California, Berkeley. She worked in the computer industry for years before writing full time.

== Bibliography ==
=== Single Novels ===
- Come into the Sun (1984)
- Bluebells on the Hill (1986)
- Winter Stranger, Summer Lover (1987)
- Island Paradise (1992)
- One Love Forever (1992)
- Love's Fantasy (1993)
- Love's Unexpected Turn (1993)
- Miss Prim and Proper (1993)
- A Bride to Love (1993)
- Living for Love (1994)
- Cowboy's Bride (1995)
- Shining Through (1995)
- Triumph of Love (1995)
- Wanted, Wife and Mother (1995)
- One Stubborn Cowboy (1995)
- Bride of a Thousand Days (1996)
- Boss Lady and the Hired Hand (1997)
- Santa Cowboy (1997)
- Rent-A-Cowboy (1997)
- Trial Engagement (1998)
- Wanted, Perfect Wife (1998)
- Daddy and Daughters (1998)
- Temporary Father (1998)
- Yours for Ninety Days (1999)
- Banished (1999)
- The Cowboy and the Virgin (1999)
- The Husband Campaign (1999)
- Bachelor's Baby Promise (2000)
- The Substitute Wife (2001)
- The Marriage Test (2001)
- Starting with a Kiss (2001)
- His Secretary's Secret' (2002)
- The Sheikh's Proposal (2002)
- The Tycoon Prince (2003)
- His Convenient Fiancee(2003)
- The Boss's Convenient Proposal (2003)
- She's Expecting (2003)
- The Rancher's Bride (2004)
- Marriage in Name Only (2004)
- Her Spanish Boss (2004)
- The First Day (2004)
- Her Desert Family (2004)
- Crazy About You (2004)
- Winning Back His Wife (2005)
- Snowbound Reunion (2006)
- The Nanny and the Sheikh (2006)
- His Inherited Wife (2006)
- The Sheikh's Secret (2006)
- The Last Cowboy Hero (2007)
- Forbidden Brother (2007)
- Firefighter's Doorstep Baby (2010)
- I'll Take Forever (2011)

=== Western Weddings Series ===
1. Wyoming Wedding (1996)
2. Angel Bride (1996)
3. Bride on the Ranch (1997)

=== Sheik Series ===
1. Sheik Daddy (1996)
2. The Sheik's Solution (2000)

=== Identical Twins Series ===
1. Cinderella Twin (1998)
2. The Older Man (1998)

=== Beaufort Brides Series ===
1. Marrying Margot (1999)
2. A Mother for Mollie (2000)
3. Georgia's Groom (2000)

=== Babies on the Way Series ===
1. Their Pregnancy Bombshell (2005)
2. Pregnant: Father Needed (2005)

=== The House of Poppin Hill Series ===
1. The Girl Who Came Back (2005)
2. Lies That Bind (2006)
3. Truth Be Told (2006)

=== Omnibus in Collaboration ===
- Desert Desires (2002) (with Sophie Weston)
- Crazy About You / Deal for Love (2004) (with Gywnn Morgan)
- Single with Kids / The First Day (2004) (with Lynnette Kent)
- Plain Jane Makeover (2005) (with Penny Jordan and Miranda Lee)
- Falling for the Boss (2005) (with Helen Brooks and Cathy Williams)
- Royal Proposals (2006) (with Robyn Donald and Marion Lennox)
- His Convenient Woman (2007) (with Diana Hamilton and Cathy Williams)

=== Graphic novels ===
- A Prince Needs A Princess (2006) art by Reiko Kishida, the original story The Tycoon Prince

=== Non-fiction ===
- The Complete Guide to Buying Property in Italy: Buying, Restoring, Renting, Letting and Selling (2004)
