= Pamela Brooks =

British writer

- Born: 11 February 1966 (age 60); Essex, England
- Occupation: Novelist
- Spouse: Gerard
- Children: 2
- Writing career
- Pen name: Kate Hardy
- Language: English
- Period: 1995–present
- Genres: non-fiction, romance, crime novel
- Notable awards: RoNA Award
- Website: katehardy.com

Pamela Brooks (born 11 February 1966) is a British writer of non-fiction books. She also writes romance novels and crime novels under the pseudonym of Kate Hardy. Her romance novels have won three Love Story of the Year awards by the Romantic Novelists' Association: in 2008, Breakfast at Giovanni's; in 2014, Bound by a Baby; in 2021, A Will, a Wish and A Wedding.

== Biography ==
Brooks was born in Essex, England, and grew up in Norfolk. At university, she specialized in Old English and Thomas Hardy. After graduation, she moved to Norwich, Norfolk, married Gerard, and sold her first novel. They have two children, Chris and Chloë.

== Bibliography ==
=== As Pamela Brooks ===
- Easy Step by Step Guide to Writing Advertising (2002)
- Norwich: Stories of a City (2003)
- How to Research Local History: Find Out All About Your House, Village or Town (2006)
- Norwich Street by Street (2006)
- Easy Step by Step Guide to Writing Newsletters and Articles (2006)
- How to Research Your House: Every Home Tells a Story… (2007)
- Norfolk Poisoners (2007)
- The Norfolk Almanac of Disasters (2007)
- Heroes, Villains & Victims of Norwich (2008)
- Norfolk Ghosts & Legends: Scandals, Sieges and Spooks (2008)
- The Norfolk Miscellany (2009)
- Suffolk Ghosts & Legends: Scandals, Sieges and Spooks (2009)
- Essex Ghosts & Legends: Scandals, Sieges and Spooks (2010)

=== As Kate Hardy ===
==== Cosy crime novels ====
- The Body at Rookery Barn (2023)
- The Body in the Ice House (2024)
- The Body Under the Stage (2024)
- The Body in the Lighthouse (2024)
- The Body at the Roman Baths (2025)
- The Body at the Vineyard (2025)
- The Body at the Windmill (2026)
- The Body at St Edmund's (2026)
- The Body at the Airfield (2026)

==== Romance novels ====
- A Baby of Her Own (2002)
- His Emergency Fiancee (2003)
- Her Special Child (2003)
- The Italian Doctor's Proposal (2003)
- Taking His Pulse (2003)
- The Spanish Consultant's Baby (2004)
- The Doctor's Rescue (2004)
- The Heart Consultant's Lover (2004)
- The Spanish Consultant's Baby (2004)
- The Registrar's Convenient Wife (2004)
- Where the Heart Is (2005)
- The Doctor's Tender Secret (2005)
- The Baby Doctor's Desire (2005)
- The Doctor's Pregnancy Surprise (2005)
- The Consultant's Christmas Proposal (2005)
- Their Very Special Marriage (2005)
- Seeing Stars (2006)
- Strictly Legal (2006)
- Their Christmas Dream Come True (2006)
- Her Celebrity Surgeon (2006)
- Her Honourable Playboy (2006)
- His Honourable Surgeon (2006)
- The Cinderella Project (2006)
- The Firefighter's Fiance (2006)
- The Pregnancy Ultimatum (2007)
- Mistress on Trial (2007)
- One Night, One Baby (2007)
- Breakfast at Giovanni's (2007)
- The Consultant's New-Found Family (2007)
- The Doctor's Very Special Christmas (2007)
- In the Gardener's Bed (2007)
- The Italian GP's Bride (2007)
- Hotly Bedded, Conveniently Wedded (2008)
- The Doctor's Royal Love-Child (2008)
- The Spanish Doctor's Love-Child (2008)
- In Bed With Her Italian Boss (2008)
- Sold to the Highest Bidder! (2008)
- The Millionaire Boss's Reluctant Mistress (2009)
- Temporary Boss, Permanent Mistress (2009)
- Falling for the Playboy Millionaire (2009)
- Playboy Boss, Pregnancy of Passion (2009)
- Surrender to the Playboy Sheikh (2009)
- The Children's Doctor's Special Proposal (2009)
- The Greek Doctor's New Year Baby (2009)
- Good Girl Or Gold-Digger? (2010)
- Red Wine and Her Sexy Ex (2010)
- The Doctor's Lost-and-Found Bride (2010)
- Neurosurgeon... and Mum! (2010)
- Champagne With a Celebrity (2010)
- A Christmas Knight (2010)
- The Fireman and Nurse Loveday (2011)
- A Moment on the Lips (2011)
- Italian Doctor, No Strings Attached (2011)
- The Ex Who Hired Her (2012)
- Dr Cinderella's Midnight Fling (2012)
- The Hidden Heart of Rico Rossi (2012)
- Once a Playboy... (2012)
- Ballroom to Bride and Groom (2013)
- The Brooding Doc's Redemption (2013)
- Bound by a Baby (2013)
- A Date with the Ice Princess (2013)
- Behind the Film Star’s Smile (2014)
- Bound by a Baby (2014)
- Crown Prince, Pregnant Bride (2014)
- 200 Harley Street: The Soldier Prince (2014)
- It Started With No Strings (2014)
- A New Year Marriage Proposal (2014)
- A Baby to Heal Their Hearts (2015)
- It Started at a Wedding (2015)
- A Promise. . . to a Proposal? (2015)
- Falling for Mr December (2015)
- Bachelor at Her Bidding (2015)
- Her Playboy's Proposal (2016)
- Billionaire, Boss... Bridegroom? (2016)
- Holiday with the Best Man (2016)
- Capturing the Single Dad’s Heart (2016)
- Falling for the Secret Millionaire (2016)
- The Midwife’s Pregnancy Miracle (2016)
- Her Festive Doorstep Baby (2016)
- A Spoonful of Sugar (2017)
- Flirting With Fire (2017)
- Mummy, Nurse, Duchess? (2017)
- His Shy Cinderella (2017)
- The Runaway Bride and the Billionaire (2017)
- Their Pregnancy Gift (2017)
- Christmas with her Daredevil Doc (2017)
- Christmas Bride for the Boss (2017)
- Unlocking the Italian Doc’s Heart (2018)
- Reunited at the Altar (2018)
- Carrying the Single Dad’s Baby (2018)
- A Diamond in the Snow (2018)
- Heart Surgeon, Prince… Husband! (2019)
- Finding Mr Right in Florence (2019)
- Nurse and a Pup to Heal Him (2019)
- The Soldier Prince's Secret Baby Gift (2019)
- Mistletoe Proposal on the Children’s Ward (2019)
- One Night to Remember (2020)
- Fling with her Hotshot Consultant (2020)
- A Will, a Wish and a Wedding (2020)
- Forever Family for the Midwife (2020)
- Surprise Heir for the Princess (2021)
- Second Chance with her Guarded GP (2021)
- Baby Miracle for the ER Doc (2021)
- Snowbound with the Brooding Billionaire (2021)
- One Week in Venice with the CEO (2022)
- Surgeon’s Second Chance in Florence (2022)
- Crowning His Secret Princess (2022)
- Saving Christmas for the ER Doc (2022)
- Tempted by her Fake Fiance (2023)
- An English Vet in Paris (2023)
- Wedding Deal with her Rival (2023)
- Sparks Fly with the Single Dad (2024)
- A Fake Bride's Guide to Forever (2024)
- Paediatrician's Unexpected Second Chance (2024)
- His Strictly Off Limits Ballerina (2025)
- The Surgeon's Tropical Temptation (2025)
- Forbidden Kiss with the Prince (2025)
- Second Chance with the CEO (2026)
- Their Blind Date Emergency (2026)
- How to Resist Mr Right (2026)

==== London City General ====
1. The Doctor's Tender Secret (2004)
2. The Baby Doctor's Desire (2004)
3. The Doctor's Pregnancy Surprise (2005)

==== Posh Docs ====
1. Her Celebrity Surgeon (2005)
2. Her Honorable Playboy (2006)

==== The London Victoria ====
1. The Greek Doctor's New-Year Baby (2008)
2. The Children's Doctor's Special Proposal (2009)

==== To Tame a Playboy ====
1. Surrender to the Playboy Sheikh (2009)
2. Playboy Boss, Pregnancy of Passion (2009)

200 Harley Street

1. The Soldier Prince (2014)

Billionaires of London

1. Billionaire, Boss. . . Bridegroom? (2016)
2. Holiday with the Best Man (2016)

Bachelor Bake-off

1. A Spoonful of Sugar (2017)

Men of Marietta

1. Flirting with Fire (2017)

Summer at Villa Rosa

1. The Runaway Bride and the Billionaire (2017)

Miracles at Muswell Hill

1. Christmas with her Daredevil Doc (2017)
2. Their Pregnancy Gift (2017)

A Crown for Christmas

1. The Soldier Prince’s Secret Baby Gift (2019)

Changing Shifts

1. Fling with Her Hot-Shot Consultant (2020)

==== Anthologies in collaboration ====
- Precious Gifts (2005) (with Marion Lennox and Josie Metcalfe)
- Italian Proposals (2007) (with Sarah Morgan and Lee Wilkinson)
- Brides of Penhally Bay Volume 2 (omnibus) (2009) (with Margaret McDonagh, Melanie Milburne and Gill Sanderson)
- Doctor's Lost-and Found Bride / Miracle: Marriage Reunited (2010) (with Anne Fraser)
- Bought for His Bed (2010) (with Robyn Donald and Melanie Milburne)
- Christmas Knight / Nurse Who Saved Christmas (2010) (with Janice Lynn)
- Hot-Shot Heroes (2011) (with Olivia Gates and Carol Marinelli)
- Latin Lovers: Italian Playboys (2011) (with India Grey and Melanie Milburne)
- Secrets in the Village (2012) (with Margaret McDonagh, Melanie Milburne and Gill Sanderson)
- Falling for the Sheikh She Shouldn't / Dr Cinderella's Midnight Fling (2012) (with Fiona McArthur)
- Once a Playboy / Challenging the Nurse's Rules (2012) (with Janice Lynn)
