= Catherine Spencer (novelist) =

- Born: 1937 (age 88–89) Source: one of her granddaughters
- Occupation: Novelist
- Writing career
- Pen name: Catherine Spencer; Kathy Orr
- Period: 1986–2009
- Genre: Romance
- Website: www.catherinespencer.com

Catherine Spencer (born 1950) is a popular Canadian writer of over 40 romance novels in Harlequin Enterprises Ltd from 1986 to 2009. She also signed her books as Kathy Orr.

== Biography ==
Catherine Spencer was born in 1950, and went to a Catholic school. She worked as a High School English teacher. She married and had four children and five dogs.

When the menopause approached, Catherine began to write. She published her first novel in 1986. With friend and fellow writer Judith Bowen, she is a co-sponsor of the biennial Singletree Workshop, a weekend retreat for romance writers.

Now, Spencer lives with her husband in White Rock, in south of Vancouver, British Columbia. Their four children are adults, and they have eight grandchildren.

== Bibliography ==
=== As Catherine Spencer ===
==== Single Novels ====
- A Lasting Kind of Love (1986)
- Fires of Summer (1989)
- The Loving Touch (1990)
- Winter Roses (1990)
- Dear Miss Jones (1991)
- Elegant Barbarian (1992)
- Naturally Loving (1992)
- Lady Be Mine (1993)
- Love's Sting (1994)
- A Little Corner of Paradise (1995)
- Three Times a Bride (1995)
- That Man Callahan! (1996)
- Dominic's Child (1996)
- Tempting Lucas (1997)
- Christmas With a Stranger (1997)
- A Nanny in the Family (1997)
- The Secret Daughter (1998)
- Zachary's Virgin (1999)
- The Unexpected Wedding Gift (2000)
- Passion's Baby (2000)
- Mistress on His Terms (2001)
- The Millionaire's Marriage (2001)
- D'Alessandro's Child (2001)
- The Doctor's Secret Child (2002)
- MacKenzie's Promise (2002)
- Passion in Secret (2003)
- In the Best Man's Bed (2003)
- Constantino's Pregnant Bride (2003)
- The Brabanti Baby (2004)
- The Moretti Marriage (2004)
- The Italian's Secret Child (2004)
- Bertoluzzi's Heiress Bride (2006)
- The Greek Millionaire's Mistress (2007)
- The Greek Millionaire's Secret Child (2009)

==== Family Ties ====
- Simply the Best (1995)

==== Expecting! Series Multi-Author ====
- Dante's Twins (1998)
- The Pregnant Bride (2000)
- The French Count's Pregnant Bride (2006)
- The Italian Billionaire's Christmas Miracle(2016)

==== Secret Passions Series Multi-Author ====
- The Marriage Experiment (1999)

==== Internacional Doctors Series Multi-Author ====
- The Italian Doctor's Mistress (2005)

==== Italian Husbands Series Multi-Author ====
- The Italian's Convenient Wife (2005)

==== Brides of Convenience Series Multi-Author ====
- The Mediterranean Husband (2007)

==== Omnibus in Collaboration ====
- Once Bitten, Twice Shy / Love's Sting / The Wedding Effect (1996) (with Sophie Weston)
- A Christmas Seduction (2001) (with Helen Brooks and Emma Darcy)
- Caribbean Caress (2002) (with Cathy Williams)
- Christmas Secrets (2002) (with Diana Hamilton and Carole Mortimer)
- A Marriage on Paper (2005) (with Miranda Lee and Jane Porter)
- More Than a Mistress (2006) (with Emma Darcy and Anne Mather)
- Wedding Vows (2007) (with Barbara Hannay and Jessica Hart)
- Secret Passions (2007) (with Amanda Browning and Sharon Kendrick)
- Bound by a Baby (2007) (with Kate Walker and Rebecca Winters)

=== As Kathy Orr ===
==== Single Novels ====
- Seductive Deceiver (1986)
- The Drifter's Revenge (1987)
- An Invitation to Love (1987)
