= Laurelin Paige =

Laurelin Paige (born November 18, 1974), is an American writer and romance novelist. She has written Novels about romance and most of her novels have hit New York Times, Wall Street Journal and USA Today best selling list. Paige's book Fixed Trilogy was listed in People Magazine as a Reader's Choice 2014 Top Ten book of the year and was the only self published book in the ten top selling books on Amazon.

== Biography ==
Paige was born on November 18, 1974, in Logan, Utah. She grew up in North Logan, Utah, where she attended Sky View High School. She graduated from the University of Northern Colorado with a major in Musical Theater, Acting Emphasis in 1998. She also attended Berklee College of Music for a while on a scholarship for songwriting and voice. Later, she received her Masters of Business Administration with a Marketing Emphasis from Regis University.

Paige had gotten an agent and was on submission to sell her first novel when her husband lost his job as a store manager for Blockbuster due to the business closing. Her family was forced to file for bankruptcy and she decided to try to self-publish for extra income. The bankruptcy was discharged the same month she released her first novel, Fixed on You, in June 2013. Over 20,000 copies were sold within a month. By 2015, she had completed ten novels and her books had sold over one million copies worldwide.

== Bibliography ==
=== Novels ===
- The Fixed Trilogy. Paige Press LLC. 2014. ISBN 0991379659.
- Free Me. Paige Press LLC. 2014. ISBN 0991379675.
- Find Me. Paige Press LLC. 2015. ASIN B00UVXEY76.
- Fixed on You. Paige Press. 2013. ISBN 0991379632.
- Found in You. Mandevilla Press. 2013. ISBN 1627040218.
- Forever With You. Paige Press LLC. 2014. ISBN 0991379616.
- Hudson. Paige Press LLC. 2014. ISBN 0991379667.
- Falling Under You: A Fixed Trilogy Novella. Evil Eye Concepts, Incorporate. 2016. ISBN 1940887968.
- First Touch: A Novel. St. Martin's Press. 2015. ISBN 1466888326.
- Take Two. Samhain Publishing. 2014. ISBN 1619223511.
- Star Struck. Samhain Publishing. 2014. ISBN 1619225611.
- Laurelin McGee Sampler. Paige Press LLC. 2015. ASIN B00VQVB9B6.
- Last Kiss. St. Martin's Press. 2016. ISBN 9781250075208.
