= Yvonne Lindsay =

New Zealand novelist

Yvonne Lindsay is a romance novelist from New Zealand.

She was born in New Zealand to Dutch immigrant parents. She has released 36 romance novels.

== Awards ==
In 1999, her first romance novel won the Romance Writers of Australia Emma Darcy Award. Lindsay has been nominated five times for the Romance Writers of Australia RUBY award, and nominated three times for the Romance Writers of New Zealand Koru Award of Excellence. In 2004 she won the Romance Writers of New Zealand Clendon Award. In 2015 she won the Romance Writers of New Zealand Koru Award of Excellence.
