= Diana Hamilton (writer) =

British writer (died 2009)

- Born: Unknown; England
- Died: 3 May 2009; Shropshire, England
- Occupation: Novelist
- Writing career
- Pen name: Diana Hamilton
- Period: 1986–2009
- Genre: Romantic novel

Diana Hamilton (b. England – d. 3 May 2009 in Shropshire) was a popular British writer of over 50 romance novels in Mills & Boon from 1986 to 2009.

== Biography ==
At 18, she studied to art college, where she met Peter. She obtained a degree in Advertising Copywriting and she worked as a copywriter.

She married with Peter, they had a daughter, Rebecca, and a son Paul, when they moved to Wales. They returned to Shropshire, England, where they had other child Andrew.

She started writing in the 1970s, but she published her first novel in 1986.

Hamilton died on 3 May 2009, at her home in Shropshire.

== Bibliography ==
=== Single Novels ===
- Song in a Strange Land (1986)
- Dark Charade (1987)
- Impulsive Attraction (1987)
- Painted Lady (1988)
- The Wild Side (1988)
- A Secure Marriage (1989)
- Betrayal of Love (1989)
- Passionate Awakening (1990)
- An Inconvenient Marriage (1990)
- The Devil His Due (1991)
- Games for Sophisticates (1991)
- A Honeyed Seduction (1992)
- Troubleshooter (1992)
- Savage Obsession (1992)
- Threat from the Past (1993)
- Legacy of Shame (1993)
- In Name Only (1994)
- Separate Rooms (1994)
- The Last Illusion (1994)
- Waiting Game (1994)
- Sweet Sinner (1995)
- Never a Bride (1995)
- Hostage of Passion (1995)
- A Guilty Affair (1996)
- Scandalous Bride (1997)
- Wedding Daze (1997)
- A Husband's Price (1998)
- The Faithful Wife (1998)
- The Bride Wore Scarlet (1998)
- Mistress for a Night (1999)
- Bought, One Husband (1999)
- The Christmas Child (2000)
- Claiming His Wife (2001)
- The Billionaire Affair (2001)
- The Italian's Bride (2001)
- The Italian's Trophy Mistress (2002)
- His Convenient Wife (2002)
- The Spaniard's Woman (2003)
- A Spanish Vengeance (2003)
- A Spanish Marriage (2004)
- The Italian's Marriage Demand (2005)
- The Italian Millionaire's Virgin Wife (2005)
- The Italian's Price (2006)
- The Kouvaris Marriage (2006)
- The Mediterranean Billionaire's Secret Baby (2007)
- Kyriakis's Innocent Mistress (2010)

=== Nanny Wanted Series Multi-Author ===
- The Millionaire's Baby (1998)

=== Expecting! Series Multi-Author ===
- Unexpected Baby (1999)

=== Omnibus in Collaboration ===
- Solution, Marriage: Secure Marriage And Promise to Repay (1996) (with Amanda Browning)
- Husbands and Wives (2000) (with Miranda Lee and Michelle Reid)
- Marriages by Arrangement (2000) (with Anne Weale and Cathy Williams)
- Christmas Secrets (2002) (with Carole Mortimer and Catherine Spencer)
- Maybe Baby! (2002) (with Lucy Gordon and Susan Napier)
- Marriage at His Convenience (2003) (with Susan Fox and Miranda Lee)
- The Italian's Pleasure (2006) (with Sara Craven and Carol Marinelli)
- Escape to Italian Idylls (2006) (with Sara Wood)
- Christmas, Kids and Kisses (2006) (with Renee Roszel and Kate Walker)
- His Convenient Woman (2007) (with Barbara McMahon and Cathy Williams)
- The Italian's Summer Seduction (2010) (with Madeleine Ker and Karen Van Der Zee)
