= Susan Meier =

American novelist (born 1956)

- Born: April 22, 1956 (age 70); Johnstown, Pennsylvania, U.S.
- Occupation: Novelist
- Writing career
- Period: 1990–present
- Genre: Romance
- Website: www.susanmeier.com

Susan Meier (born April 22, 1956) is an American novelist, known for her popular romance novels.

== Biography ==
Susan Meier was born on April 22, 1956, in Johnstown, Pennsylvania, United States. The third of 11 children, she was raised in a big family. During high school, she wrote and directed plays complete with commercial breaks and wrote poetry.

She has worked as a major defense contractor, a columnist for a small newspaper, and a division manager for a charitable organization, as well as a legal secretary, office manager, receptionist, waitress, bingo worker, and ice cream salesperson. She decided to pursue fiction in earnest one month before her 30th birthday and published her first romance novel in 1990. She ended her tenure after 25 years when she resigned her position in the human resources department for a major defense contractor to write full-time.

She has been an active member of the Pennsylvania writers organization, Pennwriters, previously serving as President, Vice-President, Treasurer, Area Representative, Bylaws Committee Chair, and Elections Chair. She is Pennwriters' 1999 Meritorious Service Award winner. She is also a member of RWA and is a moderator on the cataromance.com Kiss and Tell bulletin board. She is a frequent workshop speaker.

Susan continues to live in Pennsylvania with her husband Michael, their three children, Michael Jr., Sarah and Allen, and two cats.

== Bibliography ==
=== Single novels ===
- Take the Risk (1990)
- Stand-In Mom (1994)
- Merry Christmas, Daddy (1996)
- Wife in Training (1996)
- Guess What? We're Married! (1998)
- Hunter's Vow (2000)
- Cinderella and the Ceo (2001)
- Marrying Money (2001)
- Married Right Away (2002)
- Married in the Morning (2002)
- The Rancher and the Mistress (2003)
- Twice a Princess (2005)
- Wishing and Hoping (2006)
- One Man and a Baby (2006)
- Her Pregnancy Surprise (2007)

=== Bundles of Joy Series Multi-Author ===
- Temporarily Hers (1995)

=== Texas Family Ties Series ===
- In Care of the Sheriff (1998)
- The Rancher and the Heiress (1999)
- Guess What? We're Married (1998)

=== Loving the Boss Series Multi-Author ===
- Husband from 9 to 5 (1999)

=== Storkville, USA Series Multi-Author ===
- His Expectant Neighbor (2000)

=== Brewster Baby Boom Series ===
- The Baby Bequest (2000)
- Bringing Up Babies (2000)
- Oh, Babies! (2000)

=== Older Man Series Multi-Author ===
- The Boss's Urgent Proposal (2002)

=== Marrying the Boss's Daughter Series Multi-Author ===
- Love, Your Secret Admirer (2003)

=== Daycare Dads Series ===
- Baby on Board (2003)
- The Nanny Solution (2003)
- The Tycoon's Double Trouble (2003)

=== Bryant Baby Bonanza Series ===
- Baby Before Business (2005)
- Prince Baby (2005)
- Snowbound Baby (2005)

=== Cupid Campaign Series ===
- With This Kiss (2006)
