= Robyn Donald =

New Zealand romance novelist

- Born: Robyn Elaine Donald; 14 August 1940 (age 86); Warkworth, New Zealand
- Occupation: Novelist
- Spouse: Donald James Kingston
- Children: 2
- Writing career
- Pen name: Robyn Donald
- Period: 1977–present
- Genre: Romantic novel

Robyn Donald (born 14 August 1940) is a prolific New Zealand writer of romance novels since 1977. Her books have print runs of up to 500,000 copies at a time.

== Biography ==
Donald was born in Warkworth where her father owned a dairy farm. She trained and worked as a teacher. In 1960, she married Donald James Kingston. She now lives at Kerikeri in Northland.

At a time when her husband was suffering from a heart attack, he encouraged her to finish the manuscript she was writing at the time, and send it off. She was not convinced, but since his doctor had asked her to humor her husband, she finished the manuscript, and sent it to the editors. Three months later, she was surprised to receive a letter from the editor saying that if she made a few revisions they would buy her novel Bride at Whangatapu. Donald has written over 85 published novels for Mills & Boon that have been translated into 25 languages.

Her first romance titled Bride at Whangatapu was published under the exegesis of Mills & Boon in 1977, and her fiftieth novel The Mirror Bride was published in 1996. She writes for the English Mills and Boon romance series, and all her books have also been re-edited under Harlequin Enterprises Limited series. They are largely urban Auckland-based romances set in the elite of corporate executives, property investors and lawyers with feisty independent career-oriented heroines and apparently callous and dominating heroes; compared to the earlier South Island-oriented Anglophile romances of Essie Summers.

== Bibliography ==
=== Single novels ===
- Bride at Whangatapu (1977)
- Dilemma in Paradise (1978)
- Summer at Awakopu (1978)
- Shadow of the Past (1979)
- Wife in Exchange (1979)
- Iceberg (1980)
- Bay of Stars (1980)
- Interloper (1981)
- Dark Abyss (1981)
- Old Passion (1982)
- Mansion for My Love (1982)
- Gates of Rangitatau (1983)
- Return to Yesterday (1983)
- Guarded Heart (1983)
- Durable Line (1984) aka Durable Fire
- An Unbreakable Bond (1986)
- Willing Surrender (1986)
- Country of the Heart (1987)
- Late Loving (1987)
- Smoke in the Wind (1987)
- The Sweetest Trap (1988)
- A Matter of Will (1989)
- A Summer Storm (1990)
- No Guarantees (1990)
- The Darker Side of Paradise (1990)
- No Place Too Far (1990)
- Some Kind of Madness (1991)
- Storm Over Paradise (1991)
- Once Bitten, Twice Shy (1992)
- Island Enchantment (1993)
- Element of Risk (1994)
- Tiger, Tiger (1997)
- A Forbidden Desire (1997)
- Forbidden Pleasure (1998)
- The Paternity Affair (1999)
- A Reluctant Mistress (1999)
- Sanchia's Secret (2000)
- The Devil's Bargain (2001)
- Wolfe's Temptress (2002)
- One Night at Parenga (2002)
- A Spanish Vengeance (2003)
- By Royal Command (2004)
- Virgin Bought and Paid for (2007)
- The Rich Man's Blackmailed Mistress (2009)
- Rich, Ruthless and Secretly Royal (2009)
- The Virgin and His Majesty (2009)

=== Hollingworth Series ===
1. Long Journey Back (1986)
2. Captives of the Past (1986)

=== Love's Reward Series ===
1. Love's Reward (1989)
2. A Bitter Homecoming (1989)
3. Some Kind of Madness (1991)

=== Pagan Surrender ===
1. Pagan Surrender (1993)
2. Paradise Lost (1993)

=== Dacre Series ===
1. Tiger Eyes (1994)
2. Surrender to Seduction (1998)

=== The Marriage Maker Series ===
1. The Mirror Bride (1996)
2. Meant to Marry (1996)
3. The Final Proposal (1996)

=== Royal Weddings Series ===
1. The Prince's Pleasure (2002)
2. His Pregnant Princess (2004)
3. By Royal Demand (2006)

=== The Royal House of Illyria ===
1. By Royal Demand (2006)
2. The Rich Man's Royal Mistress (2006)
3. The Prince's Convenient Bride (2007)

=== The Mediterranean Princes ===
1. His Majesty's Mistress (2008)
2. The Mediterranean Prince's captive virgin (2008)

=== A Year Down Under Series Multi-Author ===
- The Stone Princess (1991)
- The Golden Mask (1992)
- Such Dark Magic (1993)

=== Too Hot to Handle Series Multi-Author ===
- Dark Fire (1994)

=== Secrets Series Multi-Author ===
- The Colour of Midnight (1994)

=== Dangerous Liaisons Series Multi-Author ===
- Prince of Lies (1995)

=== Bride's Bay Resort Series Multi-Author ===
2. Indiscretions (1995)

=== Nanny Wanted! Series Multi-Author ===
- The Nanny Affair (1998)

=== Passion Series Multi-Author ===
- Forgotten Sins (2001)
- A Ruthless Passion (2001)

=== Foreign Affairs Multi-Author ===
- Pacific Passions (omnibus) (2002) (with Anne Mather)
- The Temptress of Tarika Bay (2003)

=== By Royal Command Multi-Author ===
- The Prince's Pleasure (2002)
- The Royal Baby Bargain (2005)

=== Mistresses Who Marry Series Multi-Author ===
- The Millionaire's Virgin Mistress (2003)

=== His Virgin Mistress Series Multi-Author ===
- The Billionaire's Passion (2004) aka Ruthless Billionaire, Inexperienced Mistress

=== Bedded By Blackmail Series Multi-Author ===
- The Blackmail Bargain (2005)

=== The Royal House of Niroli Series Multi-Author ===
- The Prince's Forbidden Virgin (2007)

=== Royal and Ruthless Series Multi-Author ===
- Innocent Mistress, Royal Wife (2008)

=== Collections ===
- Best of Robyn Donald: Summer at Awakopu, Wife in Exchange (1984)
- Daddy's Home (1997)
- Mirror Bride / Meant to Marry (2005)

=== Omnibus in collaboration ===
- Captive Hearts (1998) (with Lynne Graham and Charlotte Lamb)
- His Secret Baby (2004) (with Miranda Lee and Kate Walker)
- The Tycoon's Love Child (2005) (with Jacqueline Baird and Anne Mather)
- Dark Seductions (2005) (with Sara Craven and Anne Mather)
- Royal Proposals (2006) (with Marion Lennox and Barbara McMahon)

=== Non fiction ===
- "Mean, Moody, and Magnificent: The Hero in Romance Literature" essay in Dangerous Men and Adventurous Women: Romance Writers on the Appeal of the Romance (1992, ISBN 0-8122-3192-9, 0-8122-1411-0)
- Writing Romantic Fiction (1999)
