= Barbara Hannay =

Australian novelist (born 1950)

- Born: 1950 (age 75–76); Kogarah, New South Wales, Australia
- Occupation: Novelist
- Writing career
- Genre: Romance
- Notable work: Claiming His Family
- Notable awards: RITA award – Traditional Romance; 2007 Claiming His Family
- Website: www.barbarahannay.com

Barbara Hannay is an Australian author of contemporary romance novels who was born in Kogarah, New South Wales, in 1950.

== Biography ==
Hannay has long been interested in writing. When she joined the Brownies as a child, she earned her first proficiency badge in writing. Throughout her school years, Hannay continued to write, especially short stories and poetry, but never attempted to publish any of her work. As an adult, she taught English on the high school level. One year she was assigned to teach English for Year 11 students, with a required focus on popular fiction. She intended to use romance novels as an example of popular fiction that focuses on stereotypical characters and plots. After reading several Mills and Boon romances, however, she "recognised ... that today's romances have the same ingredients I enjoyed in the classic girls book I read when I was young. ... all these stories had spirited heroines and gorgeous guys who were perfect for them". She enjoyed the short length of the novels and the fact that they focused on women and left hope of a happy ending.

For over four years, Hannay wrote contemporary romance novels and attempted to find a publisher. She was rejected four times before her work was accepted by the Harlequin Romance line of "sweet" category romances. The first book she sold was set in the Australian outback, and many of her others have also used that setting. Her novels have been translated into 20 languages, including Arabic, Russian, and Japanese, and are especially popular in the United States, France, and Italy.

== Bibliography ==
Books published by Penguin Australia

- Zoe's Muster (2012)
- Home Before Sundown (2013)
- Moonlight Plains (2014)
- The Secret Years (2015)
- The Grazier's Wife (2016)
- The Country Wedding (2017)
- The Summer of Secrets (2018)
- Meet Me in Venice (2019)
- The Sister's Gift (2020)

=== Southern Cross Ranch series ===
- The Cattleman's English Rose (2004)
- The Blind Date Surprise (2005)
- The Mirrabrook Marriage (2005)

=== Novels ===
- Outback Wife and Mother (1999)
- The Wedding Countdown (1999)
- Borrowed Bachelor (1999)
- Outback Baby (2000)
- Outback With the Boss (2000)
- The Pregnancy Discovery (2001)
- The Wedding Dare (2001)
- Their Doorstep Baby (2002)
- A Bride at Birralee (2002)
- A Wedding at Windaroo (2003)
- A Parisian Proposition (2003)
- Her Playboy Challenge (2003)
- Princess in the Outback (2004)
- Her Secret, His Son (2004)
- Having the Boss's Babies (2005)
- Christmas Gift: A Family (2005)
- Claiming The Cattleman's Heart (2006)
- Claiming His Family (2006)
- In the Heart of the Outback... (2007)
- Needed: Her Mr Right (2007)
- The Bridesmaid's Best Man (2008)
- Adopted: Outback Baby (2008)
- Blind Date with the Boss (2008)
- Her Cattleman Boss (2009)
- Expecting Miracle Twins (2009)
- The Bridesmaid's Baby 2009
- The Cattleman's Adopted Family (2010)
- Executive, Expecting Twins (2010)
- A Miracle for His Secret Son (2010)
- Molly Cooper's Dream Date (2011)
- Rancher's Twins, Mom Needed (2011)
- Bridesmaid Says: I do (2011)
- Runaway Bride (2011)
- Falling For Mr Mysterious (2012)
- The Cattleman's Special Delivery (2012)
- Miracle at Bellaroo Creek (2013)
- Second Chance with Her Soldier (2013)
- A Very Special Holiday Gift (2014)
- The Husband She'd Never Met (2016)
- The Prince's Convenient Proposal (2017)
- Reunited by a Baby Bombshell (2017)

=== Omnibus ===
- Outback Weddings (2003) (with Margaret Way)
- Bride at Birralee / Stormbound Surgeon (2004) (with Marion Lennox)
- Her Playboy Challenge / The Outback Bridal Rescue (2005) (with Emma Darcy)
- Her Nine Month Miracle (2005) (with Marion Lennox and Cathy Williams)
- Outback Proposals (2006) (with Lindsay Armstrong and Jessica Hart)
- Wedding Vows (2007) (with Jessica Hart and Catherine Spencer)
- Seduced by the Playboy (2007) (with Amanda Browning and Kim Lawrence)

== Awards and reception ==
In 2007, Hannay won the Romance Writers of America RITA Award for Best Traditional Romance for her novel Claiming His Family. She has also been twice nominated for a Romantic Times Reviewers' Choice Award, winning in 2001 for Outback with the Boss.
