= Rebecca Winters =

American novelist

Rebecca Brown Burton
- Born: February 14, 1940; Salt Lake City, Utah, U.S.
- Died: February 15, 2023 (aged 83)
- Occupation: Novelist
- Writing career
- Pen name: Rebecca Burton, Rebecca Brown Burton, Rebecca Winters
- Period: 1978–present
- Genre: Romance

Rebecca Brown Burton (February 14, 1940 – February 15, 2023) was a popular United States writer of over 175 romance novels under her married name Rebecca Burton, under her complete name Rebecca Brown Burton, and as Rebecca Winters for Harlequin Enterprises Ltd.

== Biography ==
Born on February 14, 1940, in Salt Lake City, Utah, U.S. Burton was the daughter of Dr. John Zimmerman Brown, Jr. and Kathryn Ormsby Hyde. She studied in Lausanne, Switzerland. She studied French at the University of Utah and worked as a high school French teacher.

Her more than 175 novels, written over a 35-year career, have sold almost thirty million copies worldwide.

She had four children, Wilford, John, Dominique, and Maxim, and lived in Salt Lake City, Utah.

== Bibliography ==
=== As Rebecca Burton ===
==== Single novels ====
- By Love Divided (1978)
- The Loving Season (1979)

=== As Rebecca Brown Burton ===
==== Single novels ====
- To Love Again (1987)

=== As Rebecca Winters ===
==== Single novels ====
- Fully Involved (1990)
- The Story Princess (1990)
- Rites of Love (1991)
- Blackie's Woman (1991)
- Rescued Heart (1991)
- The Marriage Bracelet (1992)
- Both of Them (1992)
- Meant for Each Other (1992)
- Hero on the Loose (1993)
- The Nutcracker Prince (1994)
- The Baby Business (1995)
- A Man for All Time (1995)
- Return to Sender (1995)
- The Wrong Twin (1995)
- The Badlands Bride (1996)
- Not Without My Child (1996)
- Second – Best Wife (1996)
- Three Little Miracles (1996)
- Kit and the Cowboy (1996)
- Undercover Husband (1997)
- No Wife Required! (1997)
- Bride by Day (1997)
- Baby in a Million (1998)
- If He Could See Me Now (1999)
- Husband Potential (1999)
- The Faithful Bride (2000)
- The Unknown Sister (2000)
- Brides and Grooms (2000)
- Husband for a Year (2001) translate on Russian as "Жена для президента" ("Wife for president") famous Russian writer Valery Terekhin in 2003 and published in "Raduga"
- The Toddler's Tale (2001)
- Claiming His Baby (2001)
- The Forbidden Marriage (2001)
- The Bridegroom's Vow (2001)
- Italian Weddings (2001)
- The Baby Dilemma (2002)
- The Tycoon's Proposition (2002)
- Manhattan Merger (2003)
- The Frenchman's Bride (2003)
- Rafael's Convenient Proposal (2004)
- The Baby Proposal (2004)
- Husband by Request (2005)
- Their New-Found Family (2005)
- Father by Choice (2005)
- Having the Frenchman's Baby (2006)
- Meant-to-Be Marriage (2006)
- The Bride of Montefalco (2006)
- Matrimony with His Majesty (2007)
- The Lazaridis Marriage (2007)
- The Duke's Baby (2007)

==== The Nevada Men series ====
1. The Rancher and the Redhead (1993)
2. The Mermaid Wife (1994)
3. Bride of My Heart (1994)

==== The Mediterranean Dads series ====
1. The Italian Tycoon and the Nanny (2008)
2. The Italian Playboy's Secret Son (2008)

==== Strangers series ====
1. Strangers When We Meet (1997)
2. Laura's Baby (1997)

==== Taylor Family series ====
1. Until There Was You (1998)
2. Deborah's Son (1998)

==== Undercover Love series ====
1. Undercover Baby (1999)
2. Undercover Bachelor (1999)
3. Undercover Fiancee (1999)

==== Bachelor Dads & Babies ====
1. The Billionaire and the Baby (2000)
2. His Very Own Baby (2000)
3. The Baby Discovery (2000)

==== Count on a Cop series ====
1. Accidentally Yours (2001)
2. My Private Detective (2001)
3. Beneath a Texas Sky (2002)
4. She's My Mom (2002)

==== Twin Brides series ====
1. Bride Fit for a Prince (2002)
2. Rush to the Altar (2003)

==== Hawkins series ====
1. Another Man's Wife (2003)
2. Home to Copper Mountain (2003)

==== Single Father series ====
1. Woman in Hiding (2004)
2. To Be a Mother (2004)

==== The Husband Fund Series ====
1. To Catch a Groom (2004)
2. To Win His Heart (2004)
3. To Marry for Duty (2004)

==== Lost & Found Daughter series ====
1. The Daughter's Return (2005)
2. Somebody's Daughter (2006)

==== Omnibus in collaboration ====
- Blind to Love (1988) (with Connie Bennett and Emma Goldrick)
- Just Married (1993) (with Sandra Canfield, Muriel Jensen and Elise Title)
- Marry Me Again (1994) (with Michelle Reid) (Lost in Love / Fully Involved)
- Christmas Miracles (1996) (with Carole Mortimer and Betty Neels)
- Daddy For Christmas (1998) (with Pamela Browning and Jule McBride)
- Mistletoe Magic (1999) (with Betty Neels and Margaret Way)
- Amnesia (2000) (with Sandra Marton and Lee Wilkinson)
- Switched at the Altar (2001) (with Miranda Lee, Leigh Michaels and Susan Napier)
- Family Matters (2001) (with Sherry Lewis)
- His Majesty's Marriage (2002) (with Lucy Gordon) (The Prince's Choice / The King's Bride)
- A Child for Christmas (2003) (with Carole Mortimer and Jennifer Taylor)
- Coming Home for Christmas (2003) (with Helen Bianchin and Lucy Gordon)
- Coming Home (2004) (with Helen Bianchin and Lucy Gordon)
- Chocolate Fantasy / Frenchman's Bride (2004) (with Meryl Sawyer)
- All in a Day (2005) (with Jessica Hart and Carole Mortimer)
- Here Comes the Bride (2005) (with Jessica Hart)
- After the Midnight Hour / Truth or Consequences / Bachelor at Risk (2005) (with Diana Duncan and Linda Randall Wisdom)
- Christmas Proposals (2006) (with Marion Lennox and Carole Mortimer)
- To Mum, with Love (2006) (with Margaret Way)
- City Heat (2007) (with Helen Brooks and Catherine George)
- Bound by a Baby (2007) (with Catherine Spencer and Kate Walker)
