= Pamela Hartshorne =

British writer

- Born: Accra, Ghana
- Occupation: Novelist
- Partner: John
- Writing career
- Pen name: Jessica Hart, Pamela Hartshorne, Pamela Bell, Flora Harding
- Language: English
- Period: 1991 – present
- Genre: Romantic novel
- Notable work: Christmas Eve Marriage
- Notable awards: RITA award – Traditional Romance; 2005 Christmas Eve Marriage
- Website: www.pamelahartshorne.com

Pamela Hartshorne (b. Accra, Ghana) is a British writer of over 55 romance novels in Mills & Boon as Jessica Hart, she also wrote as Pamela Hartshorne, Pamela Bell and Flora Harding. She is winner of the British RoNA Award and the Romance Writers of America RITA Award.

== Biography ==
Pamela Hartshorne was born in Accra, Ghana, and grew up around Africa. She obtained a degree in French from the University of Edinburgh, Scotland, where her mother continues living. She has traveled by Tanganyika, South Africa, Papua New Guinea, Oman, Australian Outback, Kathmandu, India, Pakistan, Afghanistan, Iran, Turkey, Cameroon, Algeria, United States, Egypt, Kenya, France, Belize, Turkey, Sri Lanka, Spain, Italy, Greece... many of these countries have featured as settings in her books in one way or another.

She published her first book in 1991, and in 2004, she completed a Ph.D. on York's later medieval and early modern streets.

Jessica generally lives in York, England dividing her time between Yorkshire and Wiltshire, where her partner, John, lives.

== Bibliography ==
=== Single novels ===
- The Trouble with Love (1991)
- A Sweeter Prejudice (1991)
- No Mistaking Love (1992)
- Poseidon's Daughter (1992)
- Defiant Love (1993)
- Woman at Willagong Creek (1992)
- A Sensible Wife (1993)
- The Beckoning Flame (1993)
- Oasis of the Heart (1993)
- The Right Kind of Man (1994)
- Love's Labyrinth (1994)
- Moonshadow Man (1994)
- Partner for Love (1995)
- Legally Binding (1995)
- Wife to Be (1995)
- Working Girl (1996)
- Part-time Wife (1996)
- Kissing Santa (1996)
- Bride for Hire (1997)
- Birthday Bride (1998)
- Married for a Month (1999)
- The Convenient Fiancee (1999)
- The Honeymoon Prize (2002)
- Her Boss's Baby Plan (2003)
- Christmas Eve Marriage (2004)
- Mistletoe Marriage (2005)
- Her Ready-Made Family (2006)
- Marriage Reunited (2006)
- Barefoot Bride (2007)
- Outback Boss, City Bride (2007)
- Last-Minute Proposal (2008)
- Promoted: To Wife And Mother (2008)
- Newlyweds of Convenience (2008)
- Honeymoon with the Boss (2009)
- Under the Boss's Mistletoe (2009)
- We'll Always Have Paris (2012)
- Hitched! (2012)

=== Outback Brides ===
1. Outback Bride (1997)
2. Outback Husband (1998)
3. Baby at Bushman's Creek (2000)
4. Wedding at Waverley Creek (2000)
5. A Bride for Barra Creek (2001)

=== City Brides Series ===
1. Fiance Wanted Fast! (2003)
2. The Blind-Date Proposal (2003)
3. A Whirlwind Engagemant (2003)

=== Bridegroom Boss ===
1. Outback Boss, City Bride (2007)
2. Appointment at the Altar (2007)

=== Princess Swap ===
1. Ordinary Girl in a Tiara (2011)
2. The Secret Princess (2011)

=== Marrying the Boss Series Multi-Author ===
- Temporary Engagement (1998)

=== Australians Series Multi-Author ===
- Inherited, Twins! (2001)
- The Wedding Challenge (2002)

=== Nine to Five Series Multi-Author ===
- Assignment, Baby (2001)
- Contracted: Corporate Wife (2005)
- Business Arrangement Bride (2006)

=== Bridegroom Boss Series ===
- Appointment at the Altar (2007)

=== Omnibus in collaboration ===
- Weddings Down Under (2001) (with Helen Bianchin and Margaret Way)
- City Girls (2002) (with Liz Fielding and Penny Jordan)
- All in a Day (2005) (with Carole Mortimer and Rebecca Winters)
- Here Comes the Bride (2005) (with Rebecca Winters)
- Twins Come Too! (2006) (with Marion Lennox and Sara Wood)
- Outback Proposals (2006) (with Lindsay Armstrong and Barbara Hannay)
- Wedding Vows (2007) (with Barbara Hannay and Catherine Spencer)
- Whose Baby? (2007) (with Caroline Anderson and Lucy Gordon)
- Blind-Date Grooms (2007) (with Sara Craven and Emma Darcy)

== Awards ==
- 2005 - Romance Writers of America RITA Award, Traditional Romance – Christmas Eve Marriage
- Contracted: Corporate Wife: 2006 – Love Story of the Year Award by the Romantic Novelists' Association.
