= Marion Lennox =

Australian novelist (born 1953)

- Born: 1953 (age 72–73); Australia
- Occupation: Novelist
- Writing career
- Pen name: Marion Lennox, Trisha David
- Period: 1990–present
- Genre: Romantic novel
- Notable works: Her Royal Baby, Princess of Convenience
- Notable awards: RITA award – Traditional Romance; 2004 Her Royal Baby; RITA award – Traditional Romance; 2006 Princess of Convenience
- Website: www.marionlennox.com

Marion Lennox (born 1953) is a writer of over 110 romance novels. She began publishing in 1990, and has also written romantic novels under another pseudonym, Trisha David.

== Biography ==
Marion Lennox was born in Australia in 1953. She was raised in a farming community. She has taught statistics, been a medical receptionist, and been employed in computing at university. She is married and has two children and lives in Queenscliff, Victoria.

In search of an occupation she could pursue from home, Lennox decided to attempt novel writing. In 1988, she wrote a medical romance, Dare to Love Again, which was to be her first published novel. It was released in 1990, and since then, she has been a prolific producer of romances.

Lennox has won two Romance Writers of America RITA Awards in 2004 and 2006 for the year's Best Traditional Romance.

== Awards ==
- McTavish and Twins by Trisha David: 1999 RWAustralia's Romantic Book of the Year Finalist
- Marrying William by Trisha David: 2000 RWAustralia's Romantic Book of the Year Finalist
- Falling for Jack by Trisha David: 2000 RWAustralia's Romantic Book of the Year Finalist
- The Baby Affair by Marion Lennox: 2000 RWAustralia's Romantic Book of the Year Finalist
- Marriage for Maggie by Trisha David: 2001 RWAustralia's Romantic Book of the Year Finalist
- Bachelor Cure by Marion Lennox: 2001 RWAustralia's Romantic Book of the Year Finalist
- Tom Bradley’s Babies by Marion Lennox: 2001 RWAmerica's RITA Finalist in Traditional Romance
- 2004 - Romance Writers of America RITA Award, Traditional Romance – Her Royal Baby
- 2006 - Romance Writers of America RITA Award, Traditional Romance – Princess of Convenience

== Bibliography ==
=== As Marion Lennox ===
==== Single Novels ====
- Dare to Love Again (1990)
- Cruel Country (1990)
- Doctor Transformed (1991)
- A Bitter Judgement (1991)
- Wings of Healing (1992)
- The Healing Heart (1992)
- The Last Eden (1993)
- A Loving Legacy (1993)
- Legacy of Shadows (1993)
- One Caring Heart (1994)
- Storm Haven (1994)
- Practice Makes Marriage (1995)
- Doctor's Honour (1995)
- Dangerous Physician (1995)
- Enchanting Surgeon (1995)
- A Christmas Blessing (1995)
- Bush Doctor's Bride (1996)
- Bridal Remedy (1996)
- Promise of a Miracle (1997)
- Dr. McIver's Baby (1998)
- Hijacked Honeymoon (1998)
- Bachelor Cure (1999)
- Bushfire Bride (2000)
- Tom Bradley's Babies (2000)
- A Forever Family (2000)
- Doctor on Loan (2001)
- Emergency Wedding (2001)
- Dr. Blake's Angel (2002)
- A Royal Proposition (2002)
- Tell No One (2003)
- Stormbound Surgeon (2003)
- To the Doctor, a Daughter (2003)
- Her Royal Baby (2003)
- In Dr Darling's Care (2004)
- The Last-Minute Marriage (2004)
- The Doctor's Special Touch (2005)
- Rescued by a Millionaire (2005)
- Bride by Accident (2005)
- Rescue at Cradle Lake (2006)
- The Surgeon's Family Miracle (2006)
- His Secret Love-Child (2006)
- The Prince's Outback Bride (2007)
- His Miracle Bride (2007)
- Their Lost & Found Family (2007)
- Dynamite Doc or Christmas Dad? (2011)

==== Harlequin Prescription: Romance Series ====
1. Prescription-One Bride (1996)
2. Prescription-One Husband (1996)
3. Bachelor Cure (1999)
4. The Baby Affair (1999)

==== Parents Wanted Series ====
1. A Child in Need (2000)
2. Their Baby Bargain (2001)
3. Adopted, Twins! (2001)
4. The Doctor's Baby (2002)

==== Australians Series Multi-Author ====
- A Millionaire for Molly (2002)

==== Maitland Maternity Series Multi-Author ====
23. Adopt a Dad (2003)

==== Air Rescue Series Multi-Author ====
- The Doctor's Rescue Mission (2005)

==== Police Surgeons Series Multi-Author ====
- The Police Doctor's Secret (2004)

==== Heart to Heart Series Multi-Author ====
- Princess of Convenience (2005)

==== Castle at Dolphin Bay Series ====
- The Doctor's Proposal (2006)
- The Heir's Chosen Bride (2006)
- HIs Miracle Bride (2007)

==== Collections ====
- Dr Blake's Angel / To the Doctor – A Daughter (2004)

==== Omnibus In Collaboration ====
- Comfort and Joy (1997) (with Lynne Collins, Sharon Kendrick and Laura MacDonald)
- Mistletoe Miracles (2000) (with Catherine George and Betty Neels) (Dearest Eulalia / The Extra-special Gift/ The Doorstep Baby)
- Prescription Pregnancy (2001) (with Caroline Anderson and Josie Metcalfe)
- Outback Husbands (2002) (with Margaret Way)
- Doctors Down Under (2002) (with Alison Roberts and Meredith Webber)
- Australian Playboys (2003) (with Helen Bianchin and Margaret Way)
- Australian Tycoons (2004) (with Emma Darcy and Margaret Way)
- Bride at Birralee / Stormbound Surgeon (2004) (with Barbara Hannay)
- Shadowing Shahna / Millionaire for Molly (2004) (with Laurey Bright)
- Christmas Deliveries (2004) (with Caroline Anderson and Sarah Morgan)
- Red Thunder Reckoning / The Last-Minute Marriage (2005) (with Sylvie Kurtz)
- Her Royal Baby / Passion Price (2005) (with Miranda Lee)
- Her Nine Month Miracle (2005) (with Barbara Hannay and Cathy Williams)
- Precious Gifts (2005) (with Kate Hardy and Josie Metcalfe)
- Twins Come Too! (2006) (with Jessica Hart and Sara Wood)
- Christmas Proposals (2006) (with Carole Mortimer and Rebecca Winters) (Her Christmas Romeo / Tycoon's Christmas Engagement / Bride For Christmas)
- Royal Proposals (2006) (with Robyn Donald and Barbara McMahon)
- Australian Heroes (2007) (with Fiona McArthur and Margaret Way)

=== As Trisha David ===
==== Single Novels ====
- McTavish And Twins (1997)
- Mcallister's Baby (1997)
- Bride by Friday (1998)
- Borrowed – One Bride (1998)
- Falling For Jack (1999)
- Marrying William (1999)
- Marriage for Maggie (1999)
- Bride 2000 (1999)
