= List of Harlequin Romance novels released in 1981 =

This is a list of Harlequin Romance novels released in 1981. (Main index: List of Harlequin Romance novels)

== Releases ==
No.	Title	Author	Released	Citations
2377	Half A World Away	Gloria Bevan	January 1981	
2378	Master Of Uluru	Helen Bianchin	January 1981	
2379	Yours With Love	Mary Burchell	January 1981	
2380	Man In The Shadows	Rosemary Carter	January 1981	
2381	Lord Of Creation	Rosalind Cowdray	January 1981	
2382	Prisoner In Paradise	Marjorie Lewty	January 1981	
2383	Fool's Paradise	Ann Cooper	February 1981	
2384	Island Fiesta	Jane Corrie	February 1981	
2385	Burning Desire	Margaret Mayo	February 1981	
2386	The Silver Thaw	Betty Neels	February 1981	
2387	Lord of the High Valley	Margaret Way	February 1981	
2388	Man of Power	Mary Wibberley	February 1981	
2389	The Challenge	Kerry Allyne	March 1981	
2390	Barefoot Bride	Dorothy Cork	March 1981	
2391	Bay Of Stars	Robyn Donald	March 1981	
2392	The Girl Between	Sheila Douglas	March 1981	
2393	Caroline's Waterloo	Betty Neels	March 1981	
2394	The Magic Of His Kiss	Jessica Steele	March 1981	
2395	Borrowed Plumes	Elizabeth Ashton	April 1981	
2396	Where The Wolf Leads	Jane Arbor	April 1981	
2397	The Wrong Man	Katrina Britt	April 1981	
2398	The Winds Of Winter	Sandra Field	April 1981	
2399	The Inherited Bride	Rebecca Stratton	April 1981	
2400	Flamingo Park	Margaret Way	April 1981	
2401	Sicilian Summer	Elizabeth Ashton	May 1981	
2402	Come Back To Love	Joyce Dingwell	May 1981	
2403	Hannah	Betty Neels	May 1981	
2404	Promise At Midnight	Lilian Peake	May 1981	
2405	The Leo Man	Rebecca Stratton	May 1981	
2406	Love Beyond Reason	Karen Van der Zee	May 1981	
2407	Reunion At Pitereeka	Kerry Allyne	June 1981	
2408	When Lightning Strikes	Jane Donnelly	June 1981	
2409	Dark Surrender	Margaret Pargeter	June 1981	
2410	Marriage In Haste	Sue Peters	June 1981	
2411	The Last Night At Paradise	Anne Weale	June 1981	
2412	Summer Of The Weeping Rain	Yvonne Whittal	June 1981	
2413	Pirate's Lair	Jane Corrie	July 1981	
2414	Black Sand, White Sand	Jean S. MacLeod	July 1981	
2415	When Follows	Betty Neels	July 1981	
2416	Deception	Margaret Pargeter	July 1981	
2417	Zulu Moon	Gwen Westwood	July 1981	
2418	Fire And Steel	Mary Wibberley	July 1981	
2419	One Brief Sweet Hour	Jane Arbor	August 1981	
2420	Never Count Tomorrow	Daphne Clair	August 1981	
2421	Love Is A Dangerous Game	Marjorie Lewty	August 1981	
2422	Captivity	Margaret Pargeter	August 1981	
2423	Tug Of War	Sue Peters	August 1981	
2424	Devil In Disguise	Jessica Steele	August 1981	
2425	Silver Arrow	Elizabeth Ashton	September 1981	
2426	Master Of Mahia	Gloria Bevan	September 1981	
2427	The Sugar Dragon	Victoria Gordon	September 1981	
2428	The Wild Man	Margaret Rome	September 1981	
2429	Temple Of Fire	Margaret Way	September 1981	
2430	Season Of Shadows	Yvonne Whittal	September 1981	
2431	Bride For Sale	Jane Corrie	October 1981	
2432	The All-The-Way Man	Joyce Dingwell	October 1981	
2433	Wolf At The Door	Victoria Gordon	October 1981	
2434	The Silken Cage	Rebecca Stratton	October 1981	
2435	Shadow Dance	Margaret Way	October 1981	
2436	Rain Of Diamonds	Anne Weale	October 1981	
2437	Iceberg	Robyn Donald	November 1981	
2438	The Everywhere Man	Victoria Gordon	November 1981	
2439	A Taste Of Paradise	Margaret Mayo	November 1981	
2440	Not Once But Twice	Betty Neels	November 1981	
2441	The Light Within	Yvonne Whittal	November 1981	
2442	Lord Of The Isles	Henrietta Reid	November 1981	
2443	Spitfire	Lindsay Armstrong	December 1981	
2444	Rebel Against Love	Elizabeth Ashton	December 1981	
2445	Miss High and Mighty	Margaret Rome	December 1981	
2446	Innocent Abroad	Jessica Steele	December 1981	
2447	On The Edge Of Love	Sheila Strutt	December 1981	
2448	A Season For Change	Margaret Way	December 1981	
