= List of Harlequin Romance novels released in 1975 =

This is a list of Harlequin Romance novels released in 1975. (Main index: List of Harlequin Romance novels)

== Releases ==
Number	Title	Author	Date	Citations
# 1841	The Magic Of Living	Betty Neels	January 1975	
# 1842	Call To The Castle	Norrey Ford	January 1975	
# 1843	Sweet Roots and Honey	Gwen Westwood	January 1975	
# 1844	The Beads Of Nemesis	Elizabeth Hunter	January 1975	
# 1845	Time Suspended	Jean S. MacLeod	January 1975	
# 1846	Lake Of Silver	Belinda Dell	January 1975	
# 1847	The Changing Years	Lucy Gillen	January 1975	
# 1848	Lord Of The Sierras	Anne Weale	January 1975	
# 1849	The Hospital Of Fatima	Isobel Chace	February 1975	
# 1850	The Storm Within	Sue Peters	February 1975	
# 1851	Dragon Island	Henrietta Reid	February 1975	
# 1852	Star Light, Star Bright	Janice Gray	February 1975	
# 1853	The Road To The Border	Elizabeth Ashton	February 1975	
# 1854	Through All The Years	Essie Summers	February 1975	
# 1855	The Impossible Marriage	Lilian Peake	February 1975	
# 1856	The Cattleman	Joyce Dingwell	February 1975	
# 1857	Cruise To A Wedding	Betty Neels	March 1975	
# 1858	Island Of Darkness	Rebecca Stratton	March 1975	
# 1859	The Man Outside	Jane Donnelly	March 1975	
# 1860	High-Country Wife	Gloria Bevan	March 1975	
# 1861	The Stairway to Enchantment	Lucy Gillen	March 1975	
# 1862	Chateau In Provence	Rozella Lake	March 1975	
# 1863	McCabe's Kingdom	Margaret Way	March 1975	
# 1864	Dear Tyrant	Margaret Malcolm	March 1975	
# 1865	Stranger In The Glen	Flora Kidd	April 1975	
# 1866	The Greater Happiness	Katrina Britt	April 1975	
# 1867	Flamingo Flying South	Joyce Dingwell	April 1975	
# 1868	The Dream On The Hill	Lilian Peake	April 1975	
# 1869	The House Of The Eagles	Elizabeth Ashton	April 1975	
# 1870	To Trust My Love	Sandra Field	April 1975	
# 1871	The Brave In Heart	Mary Burchell	April 1975	
# 1872	Cinnamon Hill	Jan Andersen	April 1975	
# 1873	A Pavement Of Pearl	Iris Danbury	May 1975	
# 1874	Design For Destiny	Sue Peters	May 1975	
# 1875	A Plume Of Dust	Wynne May	May 1975	
# 1876	Gate Of The Golden Gazelle	Dorothy Cork	May 1975	
# 1877	Means To An End	Lucy Gillen	May 1975	
# 1878	Isle Of Dreams	Elizabeth Dawson	May 1975	
# 1879	Dark Viking	Mary Wibberley	May 1975	
# 1880	Sweet Sundown	Margaret Way	May 1975	
# 1881	The End Of The Rainbow	Betty Neels	June 1975	
# 1882	Ride Out The Storm	Jane Donnelly	June 1975	
# 1883	Autumn Concerto	Rebecca Stratton	June 1975	
# 1884	The Gold Of Noon	Essie Summers	June 1975	
# 1885	Proud Citadel	Elizabeth Hoy	June 1975	
# 1886	Take All My Loves	Janice Gray	June 1975	
# 1887	Love And Lucy Brown	Joyce Dingwell	June 1975	
# 1888	The Bonds Of Matrimony	Elizabeth Hunter	June 1975	
# 1889	Reeds Of Honey	Margaret Way	July 1975	
# 1890	Tell Me My Fortune	Mary Burchell	July 1975	
# 1891	Scorched Wings	Elizabeth Ashton	July 1975	
# 1892	The House Called Sakura	Katrina Britt	July 1975	
# 1893	If Dreams Came TRUE	Rozella Lake	July 1975	
# 1894	Quicksilver Summer	Dorothy Cork	July 1975	
# 1895	Glen Of Sighs	Lucy Gillen	July 1975	
# 1896	The Wide Fields Of Home	Jane Arbor	July 1975	
# 1897	Westhampton Royal	Sheila Douglas	August 1975	
# 1898	Firebird	Rebecca Stratton	August 1975	
# 1899	Winds From The Sea	Margaret Pargeter	August 1975	
# 1900	Moonrise Over The Mountains	Lilian Peake	August 1975	
# 1901	The Blue Jacaranda	Elizabeth Hoy	August 1975	
# 1902	The Man At The Helm	Henrietta Reid	August 1975	
# 1903	Country Of The Vine	Mary Wibberley	August 1975	
# 1904	The Cornish Hearth	Isobel Chace	August 1975	
# 1905	Tabitha In Moonlight	Betty Neels	September 1975	
# 1906	Take Back Your Love	Katrina Britt	September 1975	
# 1907	Enchantment In Blue	Flora Kidd	September 1975	
# 1908	A Touch Of Honey	Lucy Gillen	September 1975	
# 1909	The Shifting Sands	Kay Thorpe	September 1975	
# 1910	Cane Music	Joyce Dingwell	September 1975	
# 1911	Stormy Harvest	Janice Gray	September 1975	
# 1912	The Spanish Inheritance	Elizabeth Hunter	September 1975	
# 1913	The Flight Of The Hawk	Rebecca Stratton	October 1975	
# 1914	Flowers In Stony Places	Marjorie Lewty	October 1975	
# 1915	East To Barryvale	Yvonne Whittal	October 1975	
# 1916	Wheels Of Conflict	Sue Peters	October 1975	
# 1917	Anna Of Strathallan	Essie Summers	October 1975	
# 1918	The Player King	Elizabeth Ashton	October 1975	
# 1919	Just A Nice Girl	Mary Burchell	October 1975	
# 1920	Harbour Of Deceit	Roumelia Lane	October 1975	
# 1921	Heaven Is Gentle	Betty Neels	November 1975	
# 1922	Cotswold Honey	Doris E. Smith	November 1975	
# 1923	Always A Rainbow	Gloria Bevan	November 1975	
# 1924	The Dark Isle	Mary Wibberley	November 1975	
# 1925	Beware The Huntsman	Sophie Weston	November 1975	
# 1926	The Voice In The Thunder	Elizabeth Hunter	November 1975	
# 1927	Wandalilli Princess	Dorothy Cork	November 1975	
# 1928	Gentle Tyrant	Lucy Gillen	November 1975	
# 1929	Collision Course	Jane Donnelly	December 1975	
# 1930	Web Of Silver	Lucy Gillen	December 1975	
# 1931	Lullaby Of Leaves	Janice Gray	December 1975	
# 1932	The Kissing Gate	Joyce Dingwell	December 1975	
# 1933	Miss Nobody From Nowhere	Elizabeth Ashton	December 1975	
# 1934	A Stranger Is My Love	Margaret Malcolm	December 1975	
# 1935	That Man Bryce	Mary Wibberley	December 1975	
# 1936	Remembered Serenade	Mary Burchell	December 1975	
