= List of Harlequin Romance novels released in 1971 =

This is a list of Harlequin Romance novels released in 1971. (Main index: List of Harlequin Romance novels)

== Releases ==
Number	Title	Author	Date	Citations
# 1457	Nurse Kelsey Abroad	Marjorie Norrell	January 1971	
# 1458	The Enchanted Island	Eleanor Farnes	January 1971	
# 1459	Beyond The Ranges	Gloria Bevan	January 1971	
# 1460	The Black Delaney	Henrietta Reid	January 1971	
# 1461	Island Of Mermaids	Iris Danbury	January 1971	
# 1462	The Man In The Next Room	Jane Donnelly	January 1971	
# 1463	The Emerald Cuckoo	Gwen Westwood	January 1971	
# 1464	The Unlived Year	Catherine Airlie	January 1971	
# 1465	Damsel In Green	Betty Neels	February 1971	
# 1466	Return To Spring	Jean S. MacLeod	February 1971	
# 1467	Beyond The Sweet Waters	Anne Hampson	February 1971	
# 1468	Yesterday, Today and Tomorrow	Jean Dunbar	February 1971	
# 1469	To The Highest Bidder	Hilda Pressley	February 1971	
# 1470	King Country	Margaret Way	February 1971	
# 1471	When Birds Do Sing	Flora Kidd	February 1971	
# 1472	Beloved Castaway	Violet Winspear	February 1971	
# 1473	Silent Heart	Louise Ellis	March 1971	
# 1474	My Sister Celia	Mary Burchell	March 1971	
# 1475	The Vermilion Gateway	Belinda Dell	March 1971	
# 1476	Believe In Tomorrow	Nan Asquith	March 1971	
# 1477	The Land Of The Lotus-Eaters	Isobel Chace	March 1971	
# 1478	Eve's Own Eden	Karen Mutch	March 1971	
# 1479	The Scented Hills	Roumelia Lane	March 1971	
# 1480	The Linden Leaf	Jane Arbor	March 1971	
# 1481	Nurse Helen	Lucy Gillen	April 1971	
# 1482	The Monkey Puzzle	Mary Cummins	April 1971	
# 1483	Never Turn Back	Jane Donnelly	April 1971	
# 1484	On A Morning	Hilda Nickson	April 1971	
# 1485	Chateau Of Pines	Iris Danbury	April 1971	
# 1486	The Post At Gundooee	Amanda Doyle	April 1971	
# 1487	Charlotte's Hurricane	Anne Mather	April 1971	
# 1488	The Head Of The House	Margaret Malcolm	April 1971	
# 1489	Town Nurse - Country Nurse	Marjorie Lewty	May 1971	
# 1490	The Fabulous Island	Katrina Britt	May 1971	
# 1491	When The Bough Breaks	Anne Hampson	May 1971	
# 1492	The Drummer And The Song	Joyce Dingwell	May 1971	
# 1493	Orange Blossom Island	Juliet Armstrong	May 1971	
# 1494	The Valley Of Illusion	Ivy Ferrari	May 1971	
# 1495	Rival Sisters	Henrietta Reid	May 1971	
# 1496	The Blue Mountains Of Kabuta	Hilary Wilde	May 1971	
# 1497	The Doctor's Circle	Eleanor Farnes	June 1971	
# 1498	Fate Is Remarkable	Betty Neels	June 1971	
# 1499	The Silent Moon	Jan Andersen	June 1971	
# 1500	Blaze Of Silk	Margaret Way	June 1971	
# 1501	The Whispering Grove	Margery Hilton	June 1971	
# 1502	Return To Dragonshill	Essie Summers	June 1971	
# 1503	My Heart Remembers	Flora Kidd	June 1971	
# 1504	Curtain Call	Kay Thorpe	June 1971	
# 1505	Paper Halo	Kate Norway	July 1971	
# 1506	The Flowering Cactus	Isobel Chace	July 1971	
# 1507	Marriage By Request	Lucy Gillen	July 1971	
# 1508	Child Of Music	Mary Burchell	July 1971	
# 1509	A Summer To Remember	Hilda Pressley	July 1971	
# 1510	Make Way For Tomorrow	Gloria Bevan	July 1971	
# 1511	Where Black Swans Fly	Dorothy Cork	July 1971	
# 1512	That Man Simon	Anne Weale	July 1971	
# 1513	Change Of Duty	Marjorie Norrell	August 1971	
# 1514	The Castle Of The Seven Lilacs	Violet Winspear	August 1971	
# 1515	O Kiss Me, Kate	Valerie Thian	August 1971	
# 1516	Those Endearing Young Charms	Margaret Malcolm	August 1971	
# 1517	Crown Of Flowers	Joyce Dingwell	August 1971	
# 1518	The Light In The Tower	Jean S. MacLeod	August 1971	
# 1519	Summer Comes To Albarosa	Iris Danbury	August 1971	
# 1520	Into A Golden Land	Elizabeth Hoy	August 1971	
# 1521	My Sisters And Me	Barbara Perkins	September 1971	
# 1522	Love Hath An Island	Anne Hampson	September 1971	
# 1523	House Of Clouds	Ivy Ferrari	September 1971	
# 1524	Dear Professor	Sara Seale	September 1971	
# 1525	The Unknown Quest	Katrina Britt	September 1971	
# 1526	Bride In Waiting	Susan Barrie	September 1971	
# 1527	Dilemma At Dulloora	Amanda Doyle	September 1971	
# 1528	The Made Marriage	Henrietta Reid	September 1971	
# 1529	Tulips For A	Betty Neels	October 1971	
# 1530	The Man From Bahl Bahla	Margaret Way	October 1971	
# 1531	Castle Of The Unicorn	Gwen Westwood	October 1971	
# 1532	The Man In The Shadow	Jan Andersen	October 1971	
# 1533	The Girl At Smuggler's Rest	Lucy Gillen	October 1971	
# 1534	Cousin Mark	Elizabeth Ashton	October 1971	
# 1535	The House On Gregor's Brae	Essie Summers	October 1971	
# 1536	Trust In Tomorrow	Margery Hilton	October 1971	
# 1537	The Summer Nights	Jean Dunbar	November 1971	
# 1538	It Happened In Paris	Elizabeth Hoy	November 1971	
# 1539	Next Door To Romance	Margaret Malcolm	November 1971	
# 1540	The Dazzle On The Sea	Flora Kidd	November 1971	
# 1541	Clove Orange	Joyce Dingwell	November 1971	
# 1542	The Mountains Of Spring	Rosemary Pollock	November 1971	
# 1543	But Not For Me	Mary Burchell	November 1971	
# 1544	The Other Miss Donne	Jane Arbor	November 1971	
# 1545	Pride's Banner	Marjorie Norrell	December 1971	
# 1546	Master Of Barracuda Isle	Hilary Wilde	December 1971	
# 1547	Cafe Mimosa	Roumelia Lane	December 1971	
# 1548	Halfway To The Stars	Jane Donnelly	December 1971	
# 1549	A Night For Possums	Dorothy Cork	December 1971	
# 1550	Pathway Of Roses	Mary Whistler	December 1971	
# 1551	Stars Of Spring	Anne Hampson	December 1971	
# 1552	The Way Through The Valley	Jean S. MacLeod	December 1971	
