= List of Harlequin Romance novels released in 1968 =

This is a list of Harlequin Romance novels released in 1968. (Main index: List of Harlequin Romance novels)

== Releases ==
| Number | Title | Author | Date | Citations |
|---|---|---|---|---|
| # 1169 | The Doctor's Delusion | Marion Collin | January 1968 | |
| # 1170 | Red Lotus | Catherine Airlie | January 1968 | |
| # 1171 | The Wings Of Memory | Eleanor Farnes | January 1968 | |
| # 1172 | Let Love Abide | Norrey Ford | January 1968 | |
| # 1173 | Red As A Rose | Hilary Wilde | January 1968 | |
| # 1174 | The English Tutor | Sara Seale | January 1968 | |
| # 1175 | Moon Over Madrid | Fiona Finlay | January 1968 | |
| # 1176 | Winds Of Enchantment | Rosalind Brett | January 1968 | |
| # 1177 | The Marriage Of Doctor Royle | Marjorie Norrell | February 1968 | |
| # 1178 | Rendezvous In Lisbon | Iris Danbury | February 1968 | |
| # 1179 | Will You Surrender | Joyce Dingwell | February 1968 | |
| # 1180 | Rose Of The Desert | Roumelia Lane | February 1968 | |
| # 1181 | Dangerous Love | Jane Beaufort | February 1968 | |
| # 1182 | Golden Apple Island | Jane Arbor | February 1968 | |
| # 1183 | Never Call It Loving | Marjorie Lewty | February 1968 | |
| # 1184 | The House Of Oliver | Jean S. MacLeod | February 1968 | |
| # 1185 | When Doctors Meet | Juliet Shore | March 1968 | |
| # 1186 | Someone Else's Heart | Barbara Allen | March 1968 | |
| # 1187 | Sweet Adventure | Mary Burchell | March 1968 | |
| # 1188 | The Grotto Of Jade | Margery Hilton | March 1968 | |
| # 1189 | Accidental Bride | Susan Barrie | March 1968 | |
| # 1190 | The Shadow And The Sun | Amanda Doyle | March 1968 | |
| # 1191 | Love Alters Not | Flora Kidd | March 1968 | |
| # 1192 | The Certain Spring | Nan Asquith | March 1968 | |
| # 1193 | Hospital In Kashmir | Belinda Dell | April 1968 | |
| # 1194 | Sunshine Yellow | Mary Whistler | April 1968 | |
| # 1195 | Spread Your Wings | Ruth Clemence | April 1968 | |
| # 1196 | Dark Inheritance | Roberta Leigh | April 1968 | |
| # 1197 | Penny Plain | Sara Seale | April 1968 | |
| # 1198 | Happy Ever After | Dorothy Rivers | April 1968 | |
| # 1199 | Johnny Next Door | Margaret Malcolm | April 1968 | |
| # 1200 | Satin For The Bride | Kate Starr | April 1968 | |
| # 1201 | The Romantic Doctor Rydon | Anne Durham | May 1968 | |
| # 1202 | Land Of Heart's Desire | Catherine Airlie | May 1968 | |
| # 1203 | The Lucky One | Marjorie Lewty | May 1968 | |
| # 1204 | This Was Love | Jean Curtis | May 1968 | |
| # 1205 | The Sun And The Sea | Marguerite Lees | May 1968 | |
| # 1206 | Substitute For Love | Henrietta Reid | May 1968 | |
| # 1207 | The Young Intruder | Eleanor Farnes | May 1968 | |
| # 1208 | Tender Is The Tyrant | Violet Winspear | May 1968 | |
| # 1209 | The Stubborn Dr. Stephen | Elizabeth Houghton | June 1968 | |
| # 1210 | A Friend Of The Family | Hilda Nickson | June 1968 | |
| # 1211 | Bride Of Kylsaig | Iris Danbury | June 1968 | |
| # 1212 | Hideaway Heart | Roumelia Lane | June 1968 | |
| # 1213 | The Moonflower | Jean S. MacLeod | June 1968 | |
| # 1214 | The Marshall Family ' | Mary Burchell | June 1968 | |
| # 1215 | Soft Is The Music | Jane Beech | June 1968 | |
| # 1216 | Oranges And Lemons | Isobel Chace | June 1968 | |
| # 1217 | A Promise Is For Keeping | Felicity Hayle | July 1968 | |
| # 1218 | Beggars Sing | Sara Seale | July 1968 | |
| # 1219 | No Place Apart | Margaret Malcolm | July 1968 | |
| # 1220 | Isle Of The Hummingbird | Juliet Armstrong | July 1968 | |
| # 1221 | Master Of Melincourt | Susan Barrie | July 1968 | |
| # 1222 | Dark Confessor | Elinor Davis | July 1968 | |
| # 1223 | The Garden Of Persephone | Nan Asquith | July 1968 | |
| # 1224 | South From Sounion | Anne Weale | July 1968 | |
| # 1225 | Nurse Camden's Cavalier | Louise Ellis | August 1968 | |
| # 1226 | Honeymoon Holiday | Elizabeth Hoy | August 1968 | |
| # 1227 | A Man Apart | Jane Donnelly | August 1968 | |
| # 1228 | The Young Nightingales | Mary Whistler | August 1968 | |
| # 1229 | A Taste For Love | Joyce Dingwell | August 1968 | |
| # 1230 | Crown Of Content | Janice Gray | August 1968 | |
| # 1231 | Imitation Marriage | Phyllis Matthewman | August 1968 | |
| # 1232 | A Day Like Spring | Jane Fraser | August 1968 | |
| # 1233 | A Love Of Her Own | Hilda Pressley | September 1968 | |
| # 1234 | Desert Gold | Pamela Kent | September 1968 | |
| # 1235 | Love As It Flies | Marguerite Lees | September 1968 | |
| # 1236 | Jemima | Leonora Starr | September 1968 | |
| # 1237 | The Last Of The Mallorys | Kay Thorpe | September 1968 | |
| # 1238 | White Rose Of Love | Anita Charles | September 1968 | |
| # 1239 | This Wish I Have | Amanda Doyle | September 1968 | |
| # 1240 | The Green Rushes | Catherine Airlie | September 1968 | |
| # 1241 | Nurse Barlow's Jinx | Marjorie Norrell | October 1968 | |
| # 1242 | New Doctor At Northmoor | Anne Durham | October 1968 | |
| # 1243 | The Isle Of Song | Hilary Wilde | October 1968 | |
| # 1244 | When Love Is Blind | Mary Burchell | October 1968 | |
| # 1245 | The Bay Of Moonlight | Rose Burghley | October 1968 | |
| # 1246 | The Constant Heart | Eleanor Farnes | October 1968 | |
| # 1247 | Laird Of Storr | Henrietta Reid | October 1968 | |
| # 1248 | Where Is Love | Norrey Ford | October 1968 | |
| # 1249 | Doctor Arnold's Ambition | Pauline Ash | November 1968 | |
| # 1250 | The Saffron Sky | Isobel Chace | November 1968 | |
| # 1251 | Venice Affair | Joyce Dingwell | November 1968 | |
| # 1252 | The Last Rose Of Summer | Jeanette Welsh | November 1968 | |
| # 1253 | Dream Come True | Patricia Fenwick | November 1968 | |
| # 1254 | The Master Of Keills | Jean S. MacLeod | November 1968 | |
| # 1255 | Little Savage | Margaret Malcolm | November 1968 | |
| # 1256 | The Pink Jacaranda | Juliet Shore | November 1968 | |
| # 1257 | Doctor At Villa Ronda | Iris Danbury | December 1968 | |
| # 1258 | Nobody's Child | Catherine Airlie | December 1968 | |
| # 1259 | Wild Sonata | Susan Barrie | December 1968 | |
| # 1260 | We Live In Secret | Dorothy Rivers | December 1968 | |
| # 1261 | With All My Heart | Nan Asquith | December 1968 | |
| # 1262 | House Of The Winds | Roumelia Lane | December 1968 | |
| # 1263 | The Lordly One | Sara Seale | December 1968 | |
| # 1264 | Secret Star | Marguerite Lees | December 1968 | |
