= List of Harlequin Romance novels released in 1967 =

This is a list of Harlequin Romance novels released in 1967. (Main index: List of Harlequin Romance novels)

== Releases ==
Number	Title	Author	Date	Citations
# 1073	The Torpington Annexe	Marjorie Norrell	January 1967	
# 1074	New Surgeon At St. Lucian's	Elizabeth Houghton	January 1967	
# 1075	Cinderella After Midnight	Mary Burchell	January 1967	
# 1076	Bells In The Wind	Kate Starr	January 1967	
# 1077	The Golden Valley	Hilary Wilde	January 1967	
# 1078	Royal Purple	Susan Barrie	January 1967	
# 1079	Highland Mist	Rose Burghley	January 1967	
# 1080	The Viking Stranger	Violet Winspear	January 1967	
# 1081	Nurse Jane In Tenerife	Catherine Airlie	February 1967	
# 1082	Army Nurse In Cyprus	Gladys Fullbrook	February 1967	
# 1083	Dearest Enemy	Kathryn Blair	February 1967	
# 1084	Galleon House	Margaret Malcolm	February 1967	
# 1085	A Change For Clancy	Amanda Doyle	February 1967	
# 1086	Gay Cavalier	Alex Stuart	February 1967	
# 1087	A Home For Jocelyn	Eleanor Farnes	February 1967	
# 1088	Spanish Moonlight	Dorothy Rivers	February 1967	
# 1089	Hospital By The Lake	Anne Durham	March 1967	
# 1090	Nurse Kate At Fallowfield	Ivy Ferrari	March 1967	
# 1091	Cuckoo In The Night	Pamela Kent	March 1967	
# 1092	The Sound Of Guitars	Jill Tahourdin	March 1967	
# 1093	His Serene Miss Smith	Essie Summers	March 1967	
# 1094	My Dark Rapparee	Henrietta Reid	March 1967	
# 1095	Mist Across the Hills	Jean S. MacLeod	March 1967	
# 1096	Cloud Castle	Sara Seale	March 1967	
# 1097	Thank You, Nurse Conway	Marjorie Norrell	April 1967	
# 1098	The Uncharted Ocean	Margaret Malcolm	April 1967	
# 1099	Carpet Of Dreams	Susan Barrie	April 1967	
# 1100	The Broken Wing	Mary Burchell	April 1967	
# 1101	The Girl At White Drift	Rosalind Brett	April 1967	
# 1102	A Quality Of Magic	Rose Burghley	April 1967	
# 1103	Heart Of Gold	Marjorie Moore	April 1967	
# 1104	The Faithless One	Elizabeth Hoy	April 1967	
# 1105	Wrong Doctor John	Kate Starr	May 1967	
# 1106	Welcome To Paradise	Jill Tahourdin	May 1967	
# 1107	They Met In Zanzibar	Kathryn Blair	May 1967	
# 1108	Summer Every Day	Jane Arbor	May 1967	
# 1109	The Fortunes of Springfield	Eleanor Farnes	May 1967	
# 1110	Labour Of Love	Dorothy Rivers	May 1967	
# 1111	The Tower Of The Captive	Violet Winspear	May 1967	
# 1112	Castle In The Mist	Alex Stuart	May 1967	
# 1113	Bequest For Nurse Barbara	Pauline Ash	June 1967	
# 1114	Trevallion	Sara Seale	June 1967	
# 1115	The Romantic Heart	Norrey Ford	June 1967	
# 1116	Play The Tune Softly	Amanda Doyle	June 1967	
# 1117	Dearly Beloved	Mary Burchell	June 1967	
# 1118	Lament For Love	Jean S. MacLeod	June 1967	
# 1119	Postscript To Yesterday	Essie Summers	June 1967	
# 1120	Heart In Hand	Margaret Malcolm	June 1967	
# 1121	Team Doctor	Ann Gilmour	July 1967	
# 1122	Whistle And I'll Come	Flora Kidd	July 1967	
# 1123	The Sea Waif	Anne Weale	July 1967	
# 1124	The New Zealander	Joyce Dingwell	July 1967	
# 1125	Darling Rhadamanthus	Margery Hilton	July 1967	
# 1126	Man Of The Islands	Henrietta Reid	July 1967	
# 1127	The Blue Rose	Esther Wyndham	July 1967	
# 1128	The Quiet Heart	Susan Barrie	July 1967	
# 1129	My Friend, Doctor John	Marjorie Norrell	August 1967	
# 1130	Dalton's Daughter	Kate Starr	August 1967	
# 1131	The Bolambo Affair	Rosalind Brett	August 1967	
# 1132	Dark Horse, Dark Rider	Elizabeth Hoy	August 1967	
# 1133	Wish On A Star	Patricia Fenwick	August 1967	
# 1134	The Man Who Came Back	Pamela Kent	August 1967	
# 1135	There Will Come a Stranger	Dorothy Rivers	August 1967	
# 1136	The Pride You Trampled	Juliet Armstrong	August 1967	
# 1137	Doctor At Drumlochan	Iris Danbury	September 1967	
# 1138	Loving Is Giving	Mary Burchell	September 1967	
# 1139	The House Of My Enemy	Norrey Ford	September 1967	
# 1140	The Man In Homespun	Margaret Malcolm	September 1967	
# 1141	The Valley Of Desire	Catherine Airlie	September 1967	
# 1142	Secret Heiress	Eleanor Farnes	September 1967	
# 1143	Journey To An Island	Hilary Wilde	September 1967	
# 1144	The Truant Bride	Sara Seale	September 1967	
# 1145	Young Doctor Yerdley	Anne Durham	October 1967	
# 1146	The Imperfect Secretary	Marjorie Lewty	October 1967	
# 1147	Fantails	Leonora Starr	October 1967	
# 1148	Flowering Wilderness	Kathryn Blair	October 1967	
# 1149	A Nightingale In The Sycamore	Jane Beaufort	October 1967	
# 1150	The Bride Of Mingalay	Jean S. MacLeod	October 1967	
# 1151	Enchanted Autumn	Mary Whistler	October 1967	
# 1152	A Garland Of Marigolds	Isobel Chace	October 1967	
# 1153	The Return Of Sister Barnett	Elizabeth Houghton	November 1967	
# 1154	You Can't Stay Here	Barbara Gilmour	November 1967	
# 1155	Miss Miranda's Walk	Betty Beaty	November 1967	
# 1156	A Place Called Paradise	Essie Summers	November 1967	
# 1157	Yesterday's Magic	Jane Arbor	November 1967	
# 1158	The Valley Of Aloes	Wynne May	November 1967	
# 1159	The Gay Gordons	Barbara Allen	November 1967	
# 1160	The Boomerang Girl	Joyce Dingwell	November 1967	
# 1161	Doctor Napier's Nurse	Pauline Ash	December 1967	
# 1162	Island Of Love	Belinda Dell	December 1967	
# 1163	Love In The Wilderness	Dorothy Rivers	December 1967	
# 1164	Meadowsweet	Margaret Malcolm	December 1967	
# 1165	Ward Of Lucifer	Mary Burchell	December 1967	
# 1166	Dolan Of Sugar Hills	Kate Starr	December 1967	
# 1167	Dear Barbarian	Janice Gray	December 1967	
# 1168	Rose In The Bud	Susan Barrie	December 1967	
