= List of Harlequin Romance novels released in 1987 =

This is a list of Harlequin Romance novels released in 1987. (Main index: List of Harlequin Romance novels)

== Releases ==
Number	Title	Author	Date	Citations
# 2809	The Tullagindi Rodeo	Kerry Allyne	January 1987	
# 2810	Ride A Wild Horse	Jane Donnelly	January 1987	
# 2811	Sweet Pretender	Virginia Hart	January 1987	
# 2812	Never Touch A Tiger	Sue Peters	January 1987	
# 2813	Unlikely Lovers	Emily Spenser	January 1987	
# 2814	Perfumes Of Arabia	Sara Wood	January 1987	
# 2815	Sea Promises	Bethany Campbell	February 1987	
# 2816	Walk Into Tomorrow	Rosemary Carter	February 1987	
# 2817	Plain Jane	Rosemary Hammond	February 1987	
# 2818	The Glass Madonna	Lisa Manning	February 1987	
# 2819	Wild For To Hold	Annabel Murray	February 1987	
# 2820	Innocent In Eden	Margaret Way	February 1987	
# 2821	Road To Love	Katherine Arthur	March 1987	
# 2822	The Folly Of Loving	Catherine George	March 1987	
# 2823	Winter At Whitecliffs	Miriam MacGregor	March 1987	
# 2824	The Secret Pool	Betty Neels	March 1987	
# 2825	Rude Awakening	Elizabeth Power	March 1987	
# 2826	Rough Diamond	Kate Walker	March 1987	
# 2827	Time To Trust	Rosemary Badger	April 1987	
# 2828	Earthly Treasures	Sarah Keene	April 1987	
# 2829	Contrasts	Rowan Kirby	April 1987	
# 2830	O'Hara's Legacy	Leigh Michaels	April 1987	
# 2831	A Talent For Loving	Celia Scott	April 1987	
# 2832	Diamond Valley	Margaret Way	April 1987	
# 2833	Softly Flits A Shadow	Elizabeth Duke	May 1987	
# 2834	Tempest In The Tropics	Roumelia Lane	May 1987	
# 2835	Love By Degree	Debbie Macomber	May 1987	
# 2836	The Night Is Dark	Joanna Mansell	May 1987	
# 2837	The Apollo Man	Jean S. MacLeod	May 1987	
# 2838	The Harlequin Hero	Dixie McKeone	May 1987	
# 2839	Odd Man Out	Sharron Cohen	June 1987	
# 2840	For Karin's Sake	Samantha Day	June 1987	
# 2841	The Marati Legacy	Dana James	June 1987	
# 2842	Immune To Love	Claudia Jameson	June 1987	
# 2843	Ring Of Claddagh	Annabel Murray	June 1987	
# 2844	Moroccan Madness	Angela Wells	June 1987	
# 2845	When Love Flies By	Jeanne Allan	July 1987	
# 2846	Tempered By Fire	Emma Goldrick	July 1987	
# 2847	Fusion	Rowan Kirby	July 1987	
# 2848	In Love With The Man	Marjorie Lewty	July 1987	
# 2849	Stairway To Destiny	Miriam MacGregor	July 1987	
# 2850	Beyond Her Control	Jessica Steele	July 1987	
# 2851	Golden Bay	Gloria Bevan	August 1987	
# 2852	The Long Way Home	Bethany Campbell	August 1987	
# 2853	Gathering Of Eagles	Angela Carson	August 1987	
# 2854	Forest Fever	Victoria Gordon	August 1987	
# 2855	Stormy Springtime	Betty Neels	August 1987	
# 2856	Bride Of Diaz	Patricia Wilson	August 1987	
# 2857	A Man Of Contrasts	Claudia Jameson	September 1987	
# 2858	King Of The Hill	Emma Goldrick	September 1987	
# 2859	Voyage Of Discovery	Hilda Nickson	September 1987	
# 2860	The Love Artist	Valerie Parv	September 1987	
# 2861	Relative Strangers	Jessica Steele	September 1987	
# 2862	Love Upon The Wind	Sally Stewart	September 1987	
# 2863	Bride On Approval	Elizabeth Ashton	October 1987	
# 2864	The Good-Time Guy	Rosemary Badger	October 1987	
# 2865	Impulsive Attraction	Diana Hamilton	October 1987	
# 2866	Sleeping Tiger	Joanna Mansell	October 1987	
# 2867	Exclusive Contract	Dixie McKeone	October 1987	
# 2868	An Old Affair	Alexandra Scott	October 1987	
# 2869	Carpentaria Moon	Kerry Allyne	November 1987	
# 2870	Winner Take All	Kate Denton	November 1987	
# 2871	Force Field	Jane Donnelly	November 1987	
# 2872	The Eagle and the Sun	Dana James	November 1987	
# 2873	Shadow Fall	Rowan Kirby	November 1987	
# 2874	Off With The Old Love	Betty Neels	November 1987	
# 2875	The Waiting Heart	Jeanne Allan	December 1987	
# 2876	The Heart Of The Matter	Lindsay Armstrong	December 1987	
# 2877	Heartland	Bethany Campbell	December 1987	
# 2878	An Engagement Is Announced	Claudia Jameson	December 1987	
# 2879	Sell Me A Dream	Leigh Michaels	December 1987	
# 2880	No Sad Song	Alison York	December 1987	
