= Lewty =

Lewty is a surname. Notable people with the surname include:

- Marjorie Lewty (1906–2002), English writer
- Simon Lewty (1941-2021), English artist
