= Sally Wentworth =

British writer

Doreen Hornsblow
- Born: 1936 or 1937; Watford, England
- Died: 30 August 2001 (aged 64)
- Occupation: Novelist
- Spouse: Donald Alfred Hornsblow
- Children: 1
- Writing career
- Pen name: Sally Wentworth
- Language: Hertfordshire, England
- Period: 1977-1999
- Genre: Romantic novel

Sally Wentworth was the pseudonym used by Doreen Hornsblow (1936 or 1937, Watford - 2001, Hertfordshire), a British romance writer of 70 romance novels in Mills & Boon's from 1977 to 1999.

== Personal life ==
Doreen was born on 1936 or 1937 in Watford, England. She and her husband, Donald Alfred Hornsblow had a son, Keith (born 1968). The family lived in Braughing, England.

She collected knife rests and she was member of The Knife Rest Collectors Club.

== Career ==
She sold her first novel to Mills & Boon's in 1977, she published her novels under the pseudonym Sally Wentworth. Her novels were principally set in Great Britain or in exotic places like the Canary Islands or Greece. Her first works are stand-alone novels, but in the 1990s, she decided to create her first series. In 1991, she wrote a book in two parts about the Barclay twins and their same great love, and in 1995, she wrote the Ties of Passion trilogy about the Brodey family.

== Death ==
Doreen Hornsblow died from cancer in 2001, aged 64.

== Bibliography ==
=== Harlequin Romance Single Novels ===
- Island Masquerade (April 1977)
- King of the Castle (Aug 1978)
- Conflict in Paradise (Oct 1978)
- Rightful Possession (April 1979)
- Liberated Lady (May 1979)
- The Ice Maiden (Jan 1980)
- Garden of Thorns (Oct 1980)

=== Harlequin Presents Single Novels ===
- Candle in the Wind (July 1980)
- Set the Stars on Fire (Oct 1980)
- Betrayal in Bali (Nov 1980)
- Race Against Love (Feb 1981)
- Say Hello to Yesterday (April 1981)
- Summer Fire (Sept 1981)
- King of Culla (Oct 1981)
- The Judas Kiss (Jan 1982)
- The Sea Master (July 1982)
- Semi-detached Marriage (Oct 1982)
- Man for Hire (Dec 1982)
- Flying High (March 1983)
- Jilted (July 1983)
- Shattered Dreams (Sept 1983)
- The Lion Rock (Jan 1984)
- Backfire (April 1984)
- Dark Awakening (Oct 1984)
- Viking Invader (Dec 1984)
- The Wings of Love (Aug 1985)
- Fatal Deception (Nov 1985)
- The Hawk of Venice (Feb 1986)
- The Kissing Game (Oct 1986)
- Cage of Ice (April 1987)
- Tiger in His Lair (July 1987)
- Passionate Revenge (Jan 1988)
- Dishonourable Intentions (July 1988)
- Ultimatum (Sept 1988)
- Mistaken Wedding (Jan 1989)
- Satan's Island (April 1989)
- Driving Force (Aug 1989)
- The Devil's Shadow (Nov 1989)
- Strange Encounter (Jan 1990)
- Wish on the Moon (June 1990)
- Echoes of the Past (Oct 1990)
- Fire Island (Jan 1991)
- Lord of Misrule (April 1991)
- Taken on Trust (Aug 1991)
- Illusions of Love (April 1992)
- Broken Destiny (Sept 1992)
- The Devil's Kiss (Dec 1992)
- The Golden Greek (April 1993)
- Stormy Voyage (July 1993)
- The Wayward Wife (Nov 1993)
- Mirrors of the Sea (March 1994)
- Practice to Deceive (Nov 1994)
- Sicilian Spring (Feb 1995)
- One Night of Love (May 1996)
- Christmas Nights (Dec 1996)
- Marriage by Arrangement (May 1997)
- The Guilty Wife (Aug 1997)
- Mission to Seduce (March 1999)

=== Barclay Twins Duology ===
1. Twin Torment (Oct 1991)
2. Ghost of the Past (Nov 1991)

=== Ties of Passion Saga ===
1. Chris (Aug 1996)
2. Francesca (Sept 1995)
3. Calum (Oct 1996)

=== Euromance Series Multi-Author ===
- Yesterday's Affair (July 1994)

=== Postcards from Europe Series Multi-Author ===
- Yesterday's Affair (July 1994)

=== Pages & Privileges Series Multi-Author ===
- Shadow Play (May 1995)
- Duel in the Sun (Sept 1995)

=== Wedlocked! Series Multi-Author ===
- To Have and to Hold (Jan 1996)

=== Scandals! Multi-Author ===
- A Very Public Affair (Oct 1997)

=== The Big Event Series Multi-Author ===
- Runaway Fiancée (Nov 1998)

=== Bachelor Tycoons Multi-Author ===
- A Typical Male! (Oct 2001)

=== Collections ===
- The Best of Sally Wentworth: Liberated Lady, Shattered Dreams (Nov 1984)

=== Omnibus in collaboration ===
- Reluctant Neighbor / Never Go Back / Island Masquerade (1983) (with Sheila Douglas, Margaret Pargeter)
- Sea Lightning / White Hibiscus / Liberated Lady (1987) (with Linda Harrel, Rosemary Pollock)
- The Master Fiddler / Forest of the Night / Rightful Possession (1988) (with Janet Dailey and Jane Donnelly)
- Mistletoe Magic (Nov 1996) (with Jeanne Allan, Jessica Hart and Penny Jordan)
- For the Baby's Sake (Sept 1997) (with Alison Fraser)
- Wedding Games (May 1998) (with Lucy Gordon and Miranda Lee)
- Christmas Presents (Dec 1999) (with Penny Jordan and Anne McAllister)
- Swept Away: 3-in-1 Lucifer s Angel / Desert Barbarian / Summer Fire (March 2009) (with Violet Winspear and Charlotte Lamb)
