= Sparring Partner =

Sparring Partner(s) may refer to:

- Sparring partner, a participant in sparring

== Film and television ==
- The Sparring Partner, a 2022 Hong Kong film
- Sparring Partners, a 1949 U.S. gameshow; see List of American game shows
- "Sparring Partners" (The Detectives), a 1994 TV episode
- "Sparring Partners" (WITS Academy), a 2015 TV episode
- "Sparring Partners", a 1988 episode of A Country Practice

== Literature ==
- Sparring Partners, a 2022 story collection, or the title story, by John Grisham
- Sparring Partners, a 1989 novel by Elizabeth Oldfield
