= Foxfire Light =

- Film poster
- Directed by: Allen Baron
- Written by: Janet Dailey
- Produced by: Jerry Adler; Bill Dailey; William Green; Robert S. Mendelsohn
- Starring: Leslie Nielsen; Tippi Hedren; Faye Grant; Barry Van Dyke; Lara Parker; John Steadman; Burton Gilliam
- Cinematography: Thomas E. Ackerman
- Edited by: Michael Pozen
- Music by: Les Hooper
- Distributed by: Ramblin' Film
- Release date: 1982
- Running time: 102 minutes
- Country: United States
- Language: English

Foxfire Light is a 1982 American romance drama film written by Janet Dailey and directed by Allen Baron. Starring Leslie Nielsen, Tippi Hedren, Faye Grant, Barry Van Dyke, and Lara Parker, it is based on a romantic novel by Janet Dailey, featuring the story of a young woman who starts a romance with a cowboy in the Ozarks.

== Plot ==
Joanna, a recent college graduate, decides to leave her manipulating mother and stay within the Ozarks in order to find herself. What she finds is a small town filled with romance and the promise of love.

== Cast ==
- Leslie Nielsen as Reece Morgan
- Tippi Hedren as Elizabeth Morgan
- Faye Grant as Joanna Morgan
- Barry Van Dyke as Linc Wilder
- Lara Parker as Rachel Parmelee
- John Steadman as Jesse
- Burton Gilliam as Deke
- Mike Coffett as Ezekiah
- Irene Coger as Old Biddy
- Stephen E. Grant as Ted
- Lonnie Hoppers as Banjo Player
- Newell Looney as Fiddle Player
- Ed Marshall as Ned
- Hal Meadows as Airport Cop
- Joe MacFerron as Boy in Car
- Erin McGuire as Waitress
- Nelia Sanders as Tanya
- A.J. Simmons as Ozark Ticket Agent
- Kevin Thomas as Chef
- Michael T. Webb as Ezzard
