= The Hidden Agenda of Sigrid Sugden =

2013 book by Jill MacLean

- Author: Jill MacLean
- Cover artist: Daniel Choi
- Language: English
- Genre: Realistic fiction
- Set in: Fiddlers Cove, Newfoundland
- Publisher: Fitzhenry & Whiteside
- Publication date: 15 October 2013
- Publication place: Canada
- Media type: Paperback, ebook
- Pages: 240
- ISBN: 978-1-55455-279-5
- Preceded by: The Nine Lives of Travis Keating, The Present Tense of Prinny Murphy

The Hidden Agenda of Sigrid Sugden is a 2013 children's realistic fiction novel by Jill MacLean. This book is a Library and Archives Canada Cataloguing in Publication. The cover images are courtesy to Chris Mills and Shutterstock. This novel is recommended for intermediate elementary to junior high school students.

== Characters ==
- Sigrid Sugden: An ordinary-looking, tidy girl with a straight nose, even teeth, right-sized mouth, and brown hair, eyebrows, and eyes. Parents divorced; former best friend moved to Calgary; lives in Fiddlers Cove.
- Mel Corkum: An unintelligent, obese, pig-ugly girl with a pug nose, no cheekbones, a double chin, straight, greasy hair, a zit near the corner of her mouth, and pale, pink-rimmed eyes set too close. Appears confident but secretly has low self-esteem; cheerful mom died in a snowstorm; does the heavy-duty jobs in the Shrikes; lives in Long Bight.
- Tate Cody: A mean, impolite, short, and wiry girl with shiny, shoulder-length black hair. Ringleader of the Shrikes; usually has empty eyes and a fake, cold smile; likes to wear chain earrings, mascara, and lipstick; does not own a bicycle; has parents who belong in the Congregation of the Sacred Brotherhood; mother works at religious bookstore; father has cold, pale blue eyes and sells life insurance; lives two doors up from Sigrid.
- Seal: Sigrid's caring stepdad; has blue eyes; moved in when Sigrid was seven; works at the liquor store; owns a truck.
- Hud Quinn: A lanky bully who never bullies girls; has hair greased into little spikes; favorite victim is Travis Keating; has a dad who likes to unreasonably beat him up; has an undersized bicycle; has a favorite rock by the cliff's edge at Gulley Cove.
- Prinny Murphy: The Shrikes' favorite victim; wears a ponytail; has two cats; best friend is Laice Hadden; father is a slow-moving fisherman with an easy smile; lives in Ratchet.
- Lorne Sugden: Sigrid's nineteen-year-old, attractive, happy-go-lucky brother; tall with broad shoulders; works out at the gym; girlfriend is Sally Parsons; is a mechanic at the garage in St. Fabien; is best buddies with Seal.
- Lessie Sugden: Sigrid's mother who is seldom home; owns a Chevy Camaro; an eBay seller with her best friend Ady Melanson; goes to thrift shops, yard sales, and auctions to search for bargains; very pretty, with blonde curls.
- Davina Murphy: An ordinary-looking woman who lives in Ratchet; husband died three years ago.
- Randy Sugden: Sigrid's father; moved to Fort McMurray; has a new wife named Barb and two blond kids aged four and five; never visits Sigrid, writes her a letter and sends fifty dollars every month.

== Plot ==
Sigrid Sugden is a member of the Shrikes, the toughest girl bullies. When one of her victims barely escapes fatal danger, Sigrid decides to quit the group—however, it is not that simple. Sigrid, by leaving the only "friends" she had, has left herself miserable from cold stares from her classmates. With problems at home and from the rest of the Shrikes, Sigrid becomes friends with Hud, determined to make everything right.

== Awards and achievements ==
- Shortlisted for the 2014/15 Red Cedar Fiction Award
- Listed on Resource Links' Best of 2013
- Nominated for the 2015 Silver Birch Award
- On the 2013 Ontario Library Association Best Bets List
- Shortlisted for The 2015 Manitoba Young Readers' Choice Award
- 7th place in the 2015 Rocky Mountain Book Award
- Nominated for The Hackmatack Children's Choice Award 2015

== Reception ==
The Hidden Agenda of Sigrid Sugden has received editorial reviews from School Library Journal and CM Magazine. School Library Journal described Sigrid's "motivation and growth" as "believable and heartbreaking". CM Magazine submitted a "highly recommended" review, wrote that "the reader proceeds with an unusual sense of disequilibrium", and described the characters as "complex and flawed" yet having "redeeming admirable qualities". CM also wrote that MacLean "places readers inside a whirlpool and shakes everything up", "helps readers to understand bullies and bullying", "pushes the story ahead, yet provides enough information about the characters", and "understands the minds of adolescents and the complexities of life for pre-teens and teenagers". The author was also described as "magnificent" with "faultless pacing".
