= Lee Wilkinson =

British writer

- Born: Nottingham, England
- Occupation: Novelist
- Writing career
- Pen name: Lee Wilkinson
- Period: 1987–present
- Genre: Romantic novel

Lee Wilkinson may also refer to the statistician Leland Wilkinson.

Lee Wilkinson (born Nottingham, England) is a popular British writer of over 30 romance novels in Mills & Boon since 1987, and is now publishing independently through the site "Lulu". Her latest romantic novel "Marley" is available through "Lulu".

== Biography ==
Lee Wilkinson born in Nottingham, England, is an only child. She was educated at an all-girls school.

Lee married Dennis at 22. They had two children, a son and a daughter, and became grandparents four times over. Following the death of Dennis she still lives in their 300-year-old stone cottage in a Derbyshire village. After publishing 39 books with Mills and Boon over many years she has now started publishing independently using the internet publisher "Lulu".

== Bibliography ==
=== Single novels ===
- Motive for Marriage (1987)
- Hong Kong Honeymoon (1991)
- My Only Love (1992)
- Joy Bringer (1992)
- Lost Lady (1993)
- Adam's Angel (1994)
- That Devil Love (1994)
- Blind Obsession (1995)
- A Husband's Revenge (1996)
- Ruthless! (1996)
- Wedding Fever (1996)
- The Secret Mother (1997)
- First-class Seduction (1997)
- The Right Fiancé? (1998)
- The Marriage Takeover (1999)
- Marriage on Trial (1999)
- Substitute Fiancée (2000)
- The Determined Husband (2000)
- A Vengeful Deception (2001)
- Wedding on Demand (2001)
- Marriage on the Agenda (2001)
- Stand-in Mistress (2002)
- Ryan's Revenge (2002)
- The Venetian's Proposal (2002)
- The Tycoon's Trophy Mistress (2003)
- At the Millionaire's Bidding (2003)
- One Night with the Tycoon (2004)
- His Mistress by Marriage (2005)
- The Carlotta Diamond (2005)
- Kept by the Tycoon (2006)
- The Bejewelled Bride (2006)
- Wife by Approval (2007)
- The Padova Pearls (2007)
- Marley (2013)

=== Omnibus in collaboration ===
- Amnesia (2000) (with Sandra Marton and Rebecca Winters)
- After Office Hours... (2006) (with Helen Brooks and Jessica Steele)
- Red-Hot Revenge (2006) (with Jacqueline Baird and Cathy Williams)
- Italian Proposals (2007) (with Kate Hardy and Sarah Morgan)
- Married to a Millionaire (2007) (with Sandra Field and Margaret Mayo)

== Sources ==
- Lee Wilkinson's webpage at Harlequin Enterprises Ltd's website
