= Mary Lyons =

British writer

Mary-Jo Wormell
- Born: 1947 (age 78–79)
- Occupations: Novelist, publisher, political
- Writing career
- Pen name: Mary Lyons
- Period: 1983–2001
- Genre: Romantic novel

Mary-Jo Wormell (born 1947), better known as Mary Lyons, was a popular British writer of 45 romance novels for Mills & Boon from 1983 to 2001.

Wormell, along with two other prolific Mills & Boon authors, launched Heartline Publishing on 14 February 2001. The publishing house was meant to fill the gap between Mills & Boon and mainstream fiction. The publishing house appears to have closed as the website is now defunct.

Wormell was a Conservative Party parliamentary candidate. She has been married three times.

== Bibliography ==
=== Single novels ===
- The Passionate Escape (1983)
- Caribbean Confusion (1983)
- Desire in the Desert (1984)
- Spanish Serenade (1984)
- Love's Tangled Web (1984)
- Dangerous Stunt (1985)
- No Other Love (1985)
- Eclipse of the Heart (1985)
- Mended Engagement (1985)
- Escape from the Harem (1986)
- Passionate Deception (1986)
- Hay Fever (1987)
- Stranger at Winterfloods (1988)
- Hurricane! (1988)
- Love in a Spin (1989)
- No Surrender (1989)
- Dark and Dangerous (1991)
- Silver Lady (1991)
- Double Fire (1992)
- Something Old, Something New, Something Borrowed, Something Blue (1992)
- Love Is the Key (1992)
- Love's Revenge (1993)
- It Started with a Kiss (1994)
- The Yuletide Bride (1995)
- Keeping Secrets (1995)
- Mr. Loverman (1996)
- Husband Not Included! (1997)
- The Valentine Affair! (1997)
- The Playboy's Baby (1999)
- The Italian Seduction (2000)
- Their Convenient Marriage (2000)

=== The Notting Hill Grooms trilogy multi-author ===
2. Reform of the Playboy (1997)

=== Big Event Series multi-author ===
- Baby Included! (1998)

=== Society Weddings Series multi-author ===
- The Society Groom (1999)

=== Omnibus in collaboration ===
- Desert Destinies (2001; with Helen Brooks and Emma Darcy)

== References and sources ==
- Harlequin Enterprises Ltd's Website
- BBC – Publishing for Love's Sake
