= Jill MacLean =

Canadian writer

- Born: 1941 (age 84–85); England
- Occupation: Novelist
- Writing career
- Pen name: Sandra Field; Jill MacLean; Jan MacLean (in collaboration); Jocelyn Haley
- Period: 1974-Present
- Genres: Romantic novel, children's fiction
- Website: jillmaclean.wordpress.com

Jill MacLean (born 1941 in England) is a Canadian writer of children's fiction books and, under the pseudonyms of Sandra Field, Jan MacLean and Jocelyn Haley, a popular author of over 70 romance novels for Harlequin Enterprises Ltd since 1974.

== Biography ==
Jill MacLean was born in 1941 in England. In 1950, her family moved to Nova Scotia, Canada.

She graduated in Science with honours from Dalhousie University. After her graduation, she married, and worked on metal-induced rancidity of cod fillets at the Fisheries Research Board, until her daughter was born. Following the birth of her son, she was employed by the pathology laboratory of Sydney City Hospital and the biology department of Mount Allison University.

When her husband joined the armed forces as a chaplain, the family moved 3 times in the first 18 months. Her children went to the school, and she did not consider to work. She read a dozen romance novels, and began to write. When she was published in 1974, she decided to use pseudonyms to avoid that her congregation knew, that the chaplain's wife wrote romances.

She published her romance novels as Sandra Field and Jocelyn Haley, and in collaboration with other Maritimer writer she wrote as Jan MacLean. She also wrote under her real name a historical biography, a collection of poetry and now to please her grandson, Stuart, she writes also children's books.

Jill is a member of The Writers' Union of Canada. She completed a Masters in Theological Studies at the Atlantic School of Theology.

Before she turned 40, her life was changed, she had lost three of the most important women in her life: her mother and sister to illness, and her seventeen-year-old daughter to a car accident. She separated from her husband in 1976

Jill now lives in Bedford, Nova Scotia, is grandmother of two grandchildren and two great-grandchildren.

== Awards ==
- Ann Connor Brimer Award for Children's Literature
- The Present Tense of Prinny Murphy: 2010 Atlantic Book Awards.

== Bibliography ==
=== As Sandra Field ===
==== Single Novels ====
- To Trust My Love (1974)
- Scent of Apples (1975)
- Winds of Winter (1980)
- Storms of Spring (1981)
- Sight of a Stranger (1981)
- Walk by My Side (1982)
- Attraction of Opposites (1983)
- A Mistake in Identity (1983)
- The Tides of Summer (1983)
- Mackenzie Country (1983)
- Change of Heart (1984)
- Out of Wedlock (1985)
- World of Difference (1985)
- One in a Million (1986)
- Ideal Match (1986)
- Single Combat (1987)
- Love in a Mist (1988)
- Chase a Rainbow (1988)
- The Right Man (1988)
- Goodbye Forever (1989)
- Ring of Gold (1989)
- The Land of Maybe (1990)
- Love at First Sight (1990)
- Happy Ending (1991)
- Safety in Numbers (1991)
- Taken by Storm (1992)
- One-Night Stand (1992)
- Travelling Light (1993)
- The Dating Game (1994)
- Wildfire (1994)
- The Sun at Midnight (1994)
- Untouched (1995)
- Honeymoon for Three (1996)
- Seducing Nell (1997)
- Up Close and Personal! (1997)
- Girl Trouble (1998)
- Remarried in Haste (1998)
- The Mother of His Child (1999)
- Jared's Love-Child (1999)
- Contract Bridegroom (2000)
- Expecting His Baby (2001)
- The Mistress Deal (2001)
- Pregnancy of Convenience (2002)
- On the Tycoon's Terms (2002)
- Surrender to Marriage (2004)
- The English Aristocrat's Bride (2005)
- His One-Night Mistress (2005)
- The Millionaire's Pregnant Wife (2006)
- The Jet-Set Seduction (2006)
- The Billionaire's Virgin Mistress (2008)

==== Significant Others Series ====
1. Beyond Reach (1995)
2. Second Honeymoon (1995)
3. After Hours (1996)

==== Millionaire Marriages Series ====
1. The Millionaire's Marriage Demand (2003)
2. The Tycoon's Virgin Bride (2003)

==== Wed Again Series ====
- Remarried in Haste (1998)

==== Man Talk Series Multi-Author ====
- Girl Trouble (1998)

==== Wedlocked! Series Multi-Author ====
- Jared's Love-Child (1999)

==== Expecting! Series Multi-Author ====
- Expecting His Baby (2001)
- Pregnancy of Convenience (2002)

==== For Love or Money Series Multi-Author ====
- His One-Night Mistress (2005)

==== Omnibus In Collaboration ====
- Blind to Love (1997) (with Catherine George)
- Bodyguards (1997) (with Elizabeth Oldfield)
- Boardroom Baby (2003) (with Emma Darcy and Kim Lawrence)
- Pregnant Brides (2004) (with Emma Darcy and Carol Marinelli)
- Hot Summer Loving (2004) (with Jacqueline Baird and Miranda Lee)
- His Virgin Lover (2006) (with Sara Craven and Susan Napier)
- The Tycoon's Virgin (2007) (with Daphne Clair and Cathy Williams)
- Married to a Millionaire (2007) (with Margaret Mayo and Lee Wilkinson)
- One Passionate Night (2008) (with Robyn Donald and Miranda Lee)
- Jet-Set Summer Affairs (2009) (with Penny Jordan and Sarah Morgan)
- To Claim His Secret Son (2009) (with Lucy Clark and Julia James)
- Her Lover Tycoon (2010) (with Amanda Browning and Lee Wilkinson)
- The Right Bride (2010) (with Sara Craven and Jessica Steele)

=== As Jill MacLean ===
==== Historical biography ====
- Jean Pierre Roma (1977)

==== Poetry ====
- The Brevity of Red (2003)

==== Children's Fiction ====
- The Nine Lives of Travis Keating (2008)
- The Present Tense of Prinny Murphy (2009)
- Home Truths (2010)
- The Hidden Agenda of Sigrid Sugden (2013)

=== As Jan MacLean ===
==== Single Novels ====
- To Begin Again (1978)
- Bitter Homecoming (1978)
- Early Summer (1979)
- White Fire (1979)
- Island Loving (1980)
- All Our Tomorrows (1982)

==== Omnibus In Collaboration ====
- The Enchanted Woods / To Begin Again / Handful of Stardust (1986) (with Katrina Britt and Yvonne Whittal)

=== As Jocelyn Haley ===
==== Single Novels ====
- Love Wild and Free (1981)
- Winds of Desire (1982)
- La Nymphe de Sioux Lake (1983)
- Romance D'Automne (1983)
- Serenade for a Lost Love (1983)
- Cry of the Falcon (1983)
- Shadows in the Sun (1984)
- Dream of Darkness (1985)
- Drive the Night Away (1988)
- A Time to Love (1989)
