= Janet Dailey =

American writer

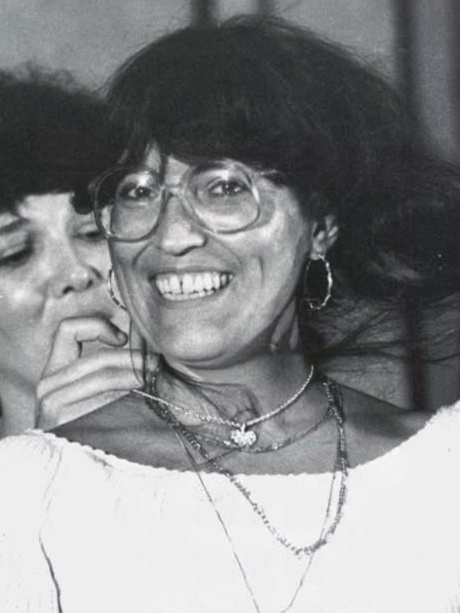
- Dailey in 1981
- Born: Janet Anne Haradon; May 21, 1944; Storm Lake, Iowa, U.S.
- Died: December 14, 2013 (aged 69); Branson, Missouri, U.S.
- Occupation: Novelist
- Writing career
- Pen name: Janet Dailey
- Period: 1974–2013
- Genre: Romance
- Website: www.janetdailey.com

Janet Anne Haradon Dailey (née Haradon; May 21, 1944 – December 14, 2013) was an American author of numerous romance novels. Her novels have been translated into nineteen languages and have sold more than 300 million copies worldwide.

== Early years ==
Janet Anne Haradon was born on May 21, 1944, in Storm Lake, Iowa, to Boyd Clayton Haradon and Lena Louise (née Zimmer) Haradon. She grew up in Iowa and graduated from high school in Independence, Iowa.

Dailey always wanted to be a writer and loved books. Her three elder sisters often read to her when she was good. By the age of four, she had her own library card. She graduated in 1962 from Jefferson High School in nearby Independence, Iowa and worked for a construction firm owned by her future husband, Bill Dailey, who was 15 years her senior. The two continued to work together, often spending 17 hours a day, seven days a week at work and married in 1964.

In 1974, after asserting that she could write a better romance novel than those she had read, Dailey's husband challenged her to prove it. Dailey spent eight months writing her first manuscript, No Quarter Asked, and then sent a query letter to Harlequin asking if they would like to read it. She was informed that because Harlequin only reprinted Mills & Boon novels at that point, so she would need to reach out to them in London. Mills & Boon acquired the book and released it in 1974. This made Dailey the first American woman to be published by Mills & Boon. In 1976, having already published multiple titles for Mills & Boon, No Quarter Asked was released by Harlequin as part of its Presents line. While many have claimed that Dailey was the first American author published by Harlequin, the Canadian publisher had in fact published many American authors prior to 1958, when it began exclusively reprinting Mills & Book titles. For the remainder of the 1970s, Harlequin reportedly used Dailey's presence on their roster as an excuse for rejecting other American authors, such as Nora Roberts, claiming they "already had their American writer."

== Category romance ==
Dailey "provide[d] ... [the] first look at heroines, heroes and courtships that take place in America, with American sensibilities, assumptions, history, and most of all, settings." She introduced the Western romance, romance novels set in the American West. The Western romance focused on the female, who was often marginalized in traditional Western novels. Because her novels were set in contemporary times, there is little frontier, but the novels recreate that feeling by introducing "physical confrontation of the elements" and focusing on the "primary nature of the pursuit" by a man and woman "unconstrained by any society's expectations of them." Many of the themes in her novels were groundbreaking for the genre. Her heroines, unlike most, lost their virginity. Others fell in love with poor or unattractive heroes.

She wrote a total of 57 novels for Harlequin. Among these novels were 50 in the "Janet Dailey Americana Series," in which every state in the United States was represented. The Guinness Book of World Records recognized her for this achievement of setting a novel in every state. By 1998, her Harlequin novels had sold a combined 80 million copies. Dailey was also one of the early writers for the Silhouette lines, for which she wrote 12 titles.

During her most prolific years, Dailey set herself the goal of writing 15 pages per day. Her day began at 4 a.m. On good days, she would meet her quota in 8 to 10 hours; other days would require 12 to 14 hours of work. When she met her goal, Dailey would often stop writing, even if she were in the middle of a sentence. The unfinished thoughts provided her an incentive to begin writing again the next day. Some of her early novels for Harlequin took only eight days to write.

== Single-title romance ==
In 1979, Dailey became the first romance author to transition from writing category romances to writing single-title romance novels. Her first mass market romance novel, Touch the Wind, reached the New York Times Best Seller List. Her subsequent books have also been New York Times Best Sellers. There are currently more than 325 million copies of her books in print, with translations in 19 languages for 98 countries.

In 1982, Dailey adapted her novel Foxfire Light into a film, starring Leslie Nielsen, Tippi Hedren, Faye Grant and Barry Van Dyke.

Dailey began offering The Janet Dailey Award in 1993. This $5,000 annual award was given to an author whose romance novel best addressed a social issue.

== Plagiarism ==
Dailey was sued in 1997 by fellow novelist Nora Roberts, who accused Dailey of copying her work over a period of more than seven years. The practice came to light after a reader read Roberts' Sweet Revenge and Dailey's Notorious back-to-back; she noticed several similarities and posted the comparable passages on the internet. Calling the plagiarism "mind rape", Roberts sued Dailey. Dailey acknowledged the theft and blamed it on a psychological disorder. She admitted that both Aspen Gold and Notorious lifted heavily from Roberts' work; both novels were subsequently pulled from print. In April 1998 Dailey settled the case. Although terms were not released, Roberts had previously indicated that any settlement funds should be donated to the Literacy Volunteers of America.

In 2001, Dailey returned to publishing with a four-book deal with Kensington Books. The contract called for two books in the Calder series Dailey has written about a ranching family in Montana, and two books with holiday themes. Kensington expanded their relationship with Dailey in 2002, when she contracted for three more hardcover novels about the Calder family and an additional mass market original novel. At the same time, they purchased the reprint rights to 50 of her previously published romances.

== Personal life ==
In 1978, Dailey and her husband Bill moved from Council Bluffs, Iowa to Branson, Missouri, where Bill promoted and produced shows at the Americana Theater. He died on August 5, 2005.

Dailey considered Branson "an ideal place to live. The weather is generally good, the country is beautiful, and the people are so friendly—and unobtrusive."

She died at her home in Branson on December 14, 2013, from complications of heart surgery.

== Bibliography ==
=== Cord and Stacy series ===
1. No Quarter Asked (1974)
2. Fiesta San Antonio (1977)
3. For Bitter or Worse (1978)

=== Single novels ===
- Something Extra (1975)
- Sweet Promise (1976)
- Master Fiddler (1977)
- Ivory Cane (1977)
- The Rogue (1979)
- Touch the Wind (1979)
- Ride the Thunder (1980)
- Hostage Bride (1981)
- The Lancaster Men (1981)
- Night Way (1981)
- For the Love of God (1982)
- Foxfire Light (1982)
- Terms of Surrender (1982)
- Wildcatter's Woman (1982)
- The Best Way to Lose (1983)
- Mistletoe and Holly (1983)
- The Second Time (1983)
- Separate Cabins (1983)
- Western Man (1983)
- Leftover Love (1984)
- Silver Wings Santiago Blue (1984)
- The Pride of Hannah Wade (1985)
- Glory Game (1985)
- The Great Alone (1986)
- Heiress (1987)
- Rivals (1988)
- Masquerade (1990)
- Tangled Vines (1992)
- Riding High (1994)
- The Proud and the Free (1994)
- Legacies (1995)
- The Healing Touch (1996)
- Notorious (1996)
- Castles in the Sand (1996)
- A Capital Holiday (2001)
- Scrooge Wore Spurs (2002)
- The Not Forgotten War (2003)
- Maybe This Christmas (2003)
- Because of You (2004)
- Can't Say Goodbye (2004)
- Dance with Me (2004)
- Everything (2004)
- Eve's Christmas (2006)
- Man of Mine (2007)
- Something More (2007)
- Wearing White (2007)
- With This Kiss (2007)

=== Calder series ===
1. This Calder Sky (1981)
2. This Calder Range (1982)
3. Stands a Calder Man (1983)
4. Calder Born, Calder Bred (1983)
5. Calder Pride (1999)
6. Green Calder Grass (2002)
7. Shifting Calder Wind (2003)
8. Calder Promise (2004)
9. Lone Calder Star (2005)
10. Calder Storm (2006)
11. Santa in Montana (2010)

=== Aspen series ===
1. Aspen Gold (1991)
2. Illusions (1997)

=== Americana series ===
1. AL-Dangerous Masquerade
2. AK-Northern Magic
3. AZ-Sonora Sundown
4. AR-Valley Of the Vapours
5. CA-Fire And Ice
6. CO-After the Storm
7. CT-Difficult Decision
8. DE-The Matchmakers
9. FL-Southern Nights
10. GA-Night Of The Cotillion
11. HI-Kona Winds
12. ID-The Travelling Kind
13. IL-A Lyon's Share
14. IN-The Indy Man
15. IA-The Homeplace
16. KS-The Mating Season
17. KY-Bluegrass King
18. LA-The Bride Of The Delta Queen
19. ME-Summer Mahogany
20. MD-Bed Of Grass
21. MA-That Boston Man
22. MI-Enemy In Camp
23. MN-Giant Of Mesabi
24. MS-A Tradition Of Pride
25. MO-Show Me
26. MT-Big Sky Country
27. NE-Boss Man From Ogallala
28. NV-Reilly's Woman
29. NH-Heart Of Stone
30. NJ-One Of The Boys
31. NM-Land Of Enchantment
32. NY-Beware Of The Stranger
33. NC-That Carolina Summer
34. ND-Lord Of the High Lonesome
35. OH-The Widow And The Wastrel
36. OK-Six White Horses
37. OR-To Tell The Truth
38. PA-The Thawing Of Mara
39. RI-Strange Bedfellow
40. SC-Low Country Liar
41. SD-Dakota Dreamin'
42. TN-Sentimental Journey
43. TX-Savage Land
44. UT-A Land Called Deseret
45. VT-Green Mountain Man
46. VA-Tidewater Lover
47. WA-For Mike's Sake
48. WV-Wild And Wonderful
49. WI-With A Little Luck
50. WY-Darling Jenny
- Americana (2001) (Omnibus)
- Americana 2 (2002) (Omnibus)
- Janet Dailey's Americana III (2002) (Omnibus)

=== New Americana Series ===
- Sunrise Canyon (2016) (Posthumous)
- Refuge Cove (2017) (Posthumous)
- Letters from Peaceful Lane (2019) (Posthumous)
- Hart's Hollow Farm (2019) (Posthumous)
- Paradise Peak (2020) (Posthumous)

=== Collections ===
- Boss Man From Ogallala / Darling Jenny (1982)
- Heart of Stone / Big Sky Country (1982)
- No Quarter Asked / The Indy Man (1982)
- Best of Janet Dailey: To Tell the Truth, That Boston Man (1983)
- Best of Janet Dailey: Bed of Grass, Heart of Stone (1984)
- Best of Janet Dailey: Wild and Wonderful, One of the Boys (1985)
- Rivals / Heiress (1991)
- Janet Dailey Collection (1994)
- Masquerade / Rivals / Heiress (1994)
- Janet Dailey Gift Set (1995)
- Summer Lovers: Strange Bedfellows; First Best And Only; Granite Man (1997)
- Always with Love (2002)
- Happy Holidays (2004)
- Western Man and Leftover Love (2004)
- Forever (2004)
- Going My Way (2005)
- Happily Ever After (2005)
- It Takes Two (2005)
- Let's Be Jolly (2005)
- Bring the Ring (2006)
- Ranch Dressing (2006)
- Try to Resist Me (2006)
- Foxfire Light / For the Love of God (2007)
- Separate Cabins / Second Time (2007)

=== Omnibus in collaboration ===
- The Jasmine Bride / Sweet Promise / Turbulent Covenant (1987) (with Daphne Clair and Jessica Steele)
- The Master Fiddler / Forest of the Night / Rightful Possession (1988) (with Jane Donnelly and Sally Wentworth)
- Mistletoe and Holly / Sweet Sea Spirit (1991) (with Emilie Richards)
- Marry Me Cowboy (1995) (with Susan Fox, Anne McAllister and Margaret Way)
- Santa's Little Helpers (1995) (with Patricia Gardner Evans and Jennifer Greene)
- Flower Girls (1996) (with Beverly Beaver, Margaret Brownley and Ruth Ann Dale)
- A Spring Bouquet (1996) (with Jo Beverley, Rebecca Brandewyne and Debbie Macomber)
- Homecoming (1997) (with Deborah Bedford, Dinah McCall and Fern Michaels)
- Unmasked (1997) (with Jennifer Blake and Elizabeth Gage)
- Wild Action (1997) (with Dawn Stewardson)
- The Only Thing Better Than Chocolate (2002) (with Kylie Adams and Sandra Steffen)

=== Non-fiction ===
- The Janet Dailey Companion: A Comprehensive Guide to Her Life and Her Novels (1996)
