= Rita Bradshaw =

British romance novelist (born 1949)

- Born: 1949 (age 76–77); Northampton, England, United Kingdom
- Occupation: Novelist
- Spouse: Clive
- Children: 3
- Writing career
- Pen name: Helen Brooks
- Period: 1992–present
- Genre: Romantic novel

Rita Bradshaw (born 1949) is a British romance novelist. She wrote historical romances under her real name and contemporary romances under the pseudonym Helen Brooks.

== Biography ==
Rita Bradshaw was born in 1949 in Northampton, England. She met her husband Clive when she was 16. They have three children.

A former secretary, she began writing in 1990 at the age of 40, and published her first novel in 1992 at Mills & Boon under the pseudonym Helen Brooks. Since 1998, she has also published historical romances under her actual name.

She lives in Northampton.

== Bibliography ==
=== As Helen Brooks ===
==== Single novels ====
- Stone Angel (1992)
- Deceitful Lover (1992)
- The Devil You Know (1992)
- Cruel Conspiracy (1992)
- Gentle Savage (1993)
- Cold Fire (1993)
- Sweet Betrayal (1993)
- And the Bride Wore Black (1993)
- A Heartless Marriage (1993)
- Bitter Honey (1993)
- Dark Oasis (1994)
- Knight in Black Velvet (1994)
- The Sultan's Favourite (1994)
- Web of Darkness (1994)
- Lovers Not Friends (1994)
- Angels Do Have Wings (1994)
- Lace and Satin (1995)
- The Twisted Cord (1995) (re-edited as Rita Bradshaw)
- Fire Beneath the Ice (1995)
- The Marriage Solution (1995)
- Dream Wedding (1996)
- Reckless Flirtation (1996)
- For a Mother's Love (1996)
- Satisfaction Guaranteed (1997)
- Treasure Hunt Vacation (1998)
- The Bride's Secret (1998)
- A Man Worth Waiting for (1998)
- Very Private Revenge (1998)
- Mistletoe Mistress (1998)
- The Marriage Quest (1999)
- A Boss in a Million (1999)
- Mistress to a Millionaire (1999)
- A Whirlwind Marriage (2000)
- Sleeping Partners (2001)
- The Greek Tycoon's Bride (2002)
- Christmas at His Command (2002)
- The Passionate Husband (2004)
- A Ruthless Agreement (2005)
- Italian Tycoon's Bride (2006)
- The Billionaire Boss's Secretary Bride (2008)
- The Boss's Inexperienced Secretary (2009)
- The Millionaire's Christmas Wife (2009)
- Sweet Surrender With the Millionaire (2010)

==== Contract Marriage Series ====
1. Husband by Contract (1997)
2. Second Marriage (1997)

==== A Proposal Series ====
1. A Convenient Proposal (2000)
2. A Suspicious Proposal (2000)

==== Stolen Moments Series Multi-Author ====
- Bitter Honey (1993)

==== From Here To Paternity Series Multi-Author ====
- The Price of a Wife (1997)

==== Expecting! Series Multi-Author ====
- The Baby Secret (1999)

==== Nine to Five Series Multi-Author ====
- The Irresistible Tycoon (2001)
- The Mistress Contract (2001)

==== Latin Lovers Series Multi-Author ====
- A Spanish Affair (2001)

==== In Love With Her Boss Series Multi-Author ====
- The Parisian Playboy (2002)
- Mistress by Agreement (2003)

==== Do Not Disturb Series Multi-Author ====
- The Christmas Marriage Mission (2003)

==== Dinner at 8 Series Multi-Author ====
- His Marriage Ultimatum (2004)
- The Millionaire's Prospective Wife (2005)
- The Billionaire's Marriage Mission (2006)
- His Christmas Bride (2007)

==== Tall, Dark and Sexy Series Multi-Author ====
- The Billionaire's Virgin Bride (2008)

==== Ruthless! Series Multi-Author ====
- Ruthless Tycoon, Innocent Wife (2008)

==== Omnibus collections ====
- Christmas Gift Pack (2000)
- Blind-date Brides (2002)
- The Devil You Know / Cruel Conspiracy (2004)
- Deceitful Lover / Gentle Savage (2004)
- Suspicious Proposal / Convenient Proposal (2005)
- Man Worth Waiting for / Marriage Quest (2006)

==== Collections In collaboration ====
- The Parent Trap (1997) (with Emma Goldrick)
- French Kiss (2001) (with Catherine George)
- Desert Destinies (2001) (with Emma Darcy and Mary Lyons)
- A Christmas Seduction (2001) (with Emma Darcy and Catherine Spencer)
- Sealed with a Kiss (2002) (with Judith Bowen and Debbie Macomber) (My Funny Valentine / Mom And Mr. Valentine / Her Secret Valentine)
- Business Affairs (2003) (with Lynne Graham and Kim Lawrence)
- Contract Husbands (2003) (with Catherine George and Jessica Steele)
- Marrying the Boss (2003) (with Alison Roberts and Jessica Steele)
- Falling for the Boss (2005) (with Barbara McMahon and Cathy Williams)
- Her Greek Millionaire (2005) (with Helen Bianchin and Sara Wood)
- After Office Hours... (2006) (with Jessica Steele and Lee Wilkinson)
- Christmas Treasures (2006) (with Caroline Anderson and Betty Neels)
- City Heat (2007) (with Catherine George and Rebecca Winters)
- It Happened At Christmas (2007) (with Penny Jordan and Carol Wood) (Bride At Bellfield Mill / Family For Hawthorn Farm / Tilly Of Tap House)
- Mistress by Consent (2007) (with Margaret Way and Sara Wood)
- The Joy of Christmas (2007) (with Betty Neels and Margaret Way)
- Winter Waifs (2007) (with Penny Jordan and Carol Wood)
- Reckless Flirtation / Luc's Revenge (2008) (with Catherine George)
- Bride at Bellfield Mill / Family for Hawthorn Farm / Tilly of Tap House (2008) (with Penny Jordan and Carol Wood)
- A Passionate Affair (2009) (with Elizabeth Power and Kathryn Ross)
- Her Mediterranean Boss (2009) (with Barbara McMahon and Trish Morey)
- Millionaire's Woman (2009) (with Catherine George and Angie Ray)

=== As Rita Bradshaw ===
==== Single novels ====
- Alone Beneath the Heaven (1998)
- Reach for Tomorrow (1999)
- Ragamuffin Angel (2000)
- The Stony Path (2001)
- The Urchin's Song (2002)
- Candles in the Storm (2003)
- The Most Precious Thing (2004)
- Always I'll Remember (2005)
- The Rainbow Years (2006)
- Skylarks at Sunset (2007)
- Eve and Her Sisters (2008)
- Above the Harvest Moon (2008)
- Gilding the Lily (2009)
- Born to Trouble (2009)
- Forever Yours (2010)
- Break of Dawn (2011)
- Dancing in the Moonlight (2013)
- Beyond the Veil of Tears (2014)
- The Colours of Love (2015)
- Snowflakes in the Wind (2016)
- A Winter Love Song (2017)
- Beneath a Frosty Moon (2018)
- One Snowy Night (2019)
- The Storm Child (2020)
