= Marius Gabriel =

British novelist

Marius Gabriel Cipolla
- Born: 13 November 1954 (age 71); Mafikeng, South Africa
- Citizenship: British
- Occupation: Novelist
- Writing career
- Pen name: Madeleine Ker, Marius Gabriel
- Period: 1983–present
- Genres: Romance, mystery, children's literature
- Website: www.mariusgabriel.info

Marius Gabriel (born 13 November 1954 in Mafikeng, South Africa) is a historical novelist. He is the author of The Redcliffe Sisters series, The Designer, The Ocean Liner, The Parisians and a number of other bestsellers.

In 2018, he and Kerry Wilkinson became the first men using their own names to win a RoNA Award in the organisation's 58-year history. Gabriel won for his historical novel, The Designer.

== Biography ==
Marius Gabriel Cipolla studied Shakespeare in the University of Newcastle in northern England. To finance his postgraduate research, he began writing romance fiction. He sold his first novel to Mills & Boon, published in 1983 under the female pseudonym Madeleine Ker. He left his academic pursuits to become a full-time writer.

He has homes in Cairo and Lincolnshire.

== Bibliography ==
=== As Marius Gabriel ===
==== Suspense novels ====
- The Mask of Time (1994)
- House of Many Rooms (1999)

==== Historical novels ====
- The Original Sin (1993)
- The Seventh Moon (2001)
- The Chronicle Of Marcellus (2009)
- Gabon (2011)
- Wish Me Luck as You Wave Me Goodbye (2015)
- Take Me to Your Heart Again (2016)
- The Designer (2017)
- The Ocean Liner (2018)
- The Parisians (2019)
- The Girls in the Attic (2021)
- Goodnight, Vienna (2023)
- The German Daughter (2024)
- The Lost Child of Warsaw (2026)

=== As Madeleine Ker ===
==== Single novels ====
- Aquamarine (1983)
- Virtuous lady (1983)
- Voyage of the Mistral (1983)
- Pacific Aphrodite (1983)
- The Street of the Fountain (1984)
- Winged Lion (1984)
- Pacific Aphrodite (1984)
- Working Relationship (1984)
- Fire of the Gods (1984)
- Out of This Darkness (1984)
- Hostage (1985)
- Comrade Wolf (1985)
- Ice Princess (1985)
- Danger Zone (1985)
- Impact (1986)
- The Wilder Shores of Love (1987)
- Judgement (1987)
- Frazer's Law (1987)
- Stormy Attraction (1988)
- Take-over (1988)
- Tuscan Encounter (1988)
- Troublemaker (1988)
- Special Arrangement (1989)
- Tiger's Eye (1989)
- Passion's Far Shore (1989)
- Duel of Passion (1990)
- Whirlpool (1992)
- The Alpha Male (2003)
- The Sicilian Duke's Demand (2005)

==== Postcards from Europe series (multi-author) ====
- The Bruges Engagement (1992)

==== Mistress to a Millionaire series (multi-author) ====
- The Millionaire Boss's Mistress (2004)

==== Omnibus in collaboration ====
- Trodden Paths / Voyage of the Mistral / Innocent Abroad (1989) (with Jacqueline Gilbert and Jessica Steele)

==== Graphic novels ====
- Never Kiss A Stranger (2006)

==== Omnibus in collaboration ====
- Anvil of Stars / The Original Sin / The Shee (1993) (with Joe Donnelly and Greg Bear)

==== Children's ====
- Smartypig (2002)

== References and sources ==
- Marius Gabriel on Fantastic Fiction
- Madeleine Ker on Fantastic Fiction
- The story of Smartypig
