= Margaret Mayo (novelist) =

British author of romance novels (born 1936)

- Born: 7 February 1936 (age 90); Staffordshire, England
- Occupation: Novelist
- Children: 2
- Writing career
- Pen name: Margaret Mayo
- Period: 1976–present
- Genre: Romantic novel
- Website: www.margaret-mayo.com

Margaret Mayo (born 7 February 1936 in Staffordshire, England) is a British writer of over 80 romance novels since 1976.

== Biography ==
Margaret Mayo was born on 7 February 1936 in Staffordshire, England. She left school at fifteen, and learned shorthand and typing, to work as a secretary for many years. At 22, she married and had two children, Adrian and Tina.

At 40, she began to publish romantic novels to Mills & Boon.

== Bibliography ==
=== Single novels ===
- Destiny Paradise (1976)
- Land of Ice and Fire (1976)
- Perilous Waters (1976)
- Shades of Autumn (1976)
- Rainbow Magic (1977)
- Sea Gypsy (1977)
- Tregenna Tyrant (1977)
- Autumn Deception (1978)
- Afraid to Love (1978)
- Unwilling Wife (1979)
- Mistaken Marriage (1979)
- Stormy Affair (1979)
- Valley of the Hawk (1979)
- Burning Desire (1980)
- Pirate Lover (1980)
- Innocent Bride (1980)
- Tormented Love (1980)
- Taste of Paradise (1981)
- Charming Enemy (1981)
- Divided Loyalties (1981)
- Diamond Stud (1981)
- Dangerous Journey (1982)
- Bitter Reunion (1982)
- Impossible Masquerade (1982)
- Emerald Coast (1982)
- Marriage Game (1983)
- Return a Stranger (1983)
- Branded (1984)
- Devil's fancy (1984)
- Personal Vendetta (1984)
- Compelling Force (1985)
- Second Encounter (1985)
- At Daggers Drawn (1986)
- Passionate Vengeance (1986)
- Impulsive Challenge (1986)
- Savage Affair (1987)
- Painful Loving (1987)
- Unexpected Inheritance (1988)
- Prisoner of the Mind (1988)
- Bittersweet Pursuit (1988)
- Conflict (1989)
- Mutual Attraction (1990)
- An Impossible Situation (1990)
- A Fiery Encounter (1991)
- Stormy Relationship (1991)
- Reluctant Hostage (1991)
- Intrigue (1991)
- Yesterday's Dreams (1992)
- Ruthless Stranger (1993)
- Determined Lady (1994)
- Wild Injustice (1994)
- A Vengeful Infatuation (1995)
- Powerful Persuasion (1996)
- Ungentlemanly Behaviour (1997)
- Dangerous Game (1999)
- Marriage by Contract (2000)
- The Wife Seduction (2000)
- Her Wealthy Husband (2001)
- Reclaiming His Bride (2004)
- The Italian's Ruthless Baby Bargain (2008)
- Baby mine (2008) e-book
- The Santorini Marriage Bargain (2009)
- The Twelve-Month Marriage Deal (2009)
- Married Again to the Millionaire (2010)
- A Night With Consequences (2011)
- A Secret Too Far (2012) e-book
- Abby's Unexpected Bodyguard (2013) e-book
- Rachel's Retribution (2014) e-book

=== First Class Series Multi-Author ===
- Trapped (1990)

=== Island Dreams Series Multi-Author ===
- Bitter Memories (1994)

=== Island Romances Series Multi-Author ===
- Stolen Feelings (1995)

=== Dark Secrets Series Multi-Author ===
- A Forbidden Marriage (1998)

=== An Engagement of Convenience Series Multi-Author ===
- Forgotten Engagement (1998)

=== Mediterranean Passions Series Multi-Author ===
- The Mediterranean Tycoon (2002)

=== Mistress Material Series Multi-Author ===
- Surrender to the Millionaire (2003)

=== Marriage and Mistletoe Series Multi-Author ===
- Her Husband's Christmas Bargain (2004)

=== Ruthless! Series Multi-Author ===
- At the Spaniard's Convenience (2006)
- Bedded at His Convenience (2007)

=== Forced to Marry Series Multi-Author ===
- Bought for Marriage (2006)

=== The Boss's Mistress Series Multi-Author ===
- The Rich Man's Reluctant Mistress (2007)

=== The Billionaire's Convenient Wife Series Multi-Author ===
- The Billionaire's Blackmail Bargain (2008)

=== Omnibus In Collaboration ===
- Island of Escape / Stormy Affair / Hostile Engagement (1987) (with Dorothy Cork and Jessica Steele)
- Kowhai Country / Not the Marrying Kind / A Taste of Paradise (1990) (with Gloria Bevan and Helen Dalzell)
- Escape to Greek Affairs (2006) (with Sara Craven)
- Married to a Millionaire (2007) (with Sandra Field and Lee Wilkinson)
- Mistresses: Bought with Emeralds (2010) (with Katherine Garbera and Sandra Marton)
- The Greeks' Bought Brides (2010) (with Julia James and Lucy Monroe)
- The Spaniard's Pleasure (2010) (with Kim Lawrence and Lucy Monroe)
