= Daphne Clair =

New Zealand writer and activist (1939–2026)

Daphne de Jong
- Born: Daphne Clair Williams; 1939; Dargaville, New Zealand
- Died: 17 November 2026 (aged 87); Whangaparāoa, New Zealand
- Occupation: Writer
- Writing career
- Pen name: Daphne Clair; Laurey Bright; Claire Lorel; Daphne de Jong; Clarissa Garland
- Period: 1977–2007
- Genres: Romance, poetry, non-fiction
- Website: daphneclair.com

Daphne Clair de Jong (née Williams; 1939 – 17 November 2026) was a New Zealand writer of romance novels as Daphne Clair and Daphne de Jong, and under the pseudonyms Laurey Bright, Claire Lorel, and Clarissa Garland. Beginning in 1977, she wrote over 75 romance novels, and also published poetry and articles. De Jong was a founding member and first president of Feminists for Life New Zealand, and wrote articles articulating its position in the 1970s. She subsequently resigned from the organisation, which had increasingly become associated with social conservatism and conservative Christianity and later became Women for Life, dropping its feminist focus. After subsequently becoming the Family Education Network in the late 1990s, the organisation ceased to exist altogether.

== Life and career ==
De Jong was born Daphne Clair Williams in Dargaville in 1939. She decided to be a writer when she was 8 years old. She published her first short story when she was 16. She wrote romantic novels, poetry and articles. She conducted a romance writing workshop for aspiring writers with Robyn Donald and offered her home as a writers' retreat. She won awards for both her romantic novels and other works.

Clair was married to Cornelius Johannes "Keith" de Jong, and the couple had five children. Daphne de Jong died at Whangaparāoa on 17 November 2026, having been predeceased by Keith de Jong in 2012.

== Bibliography ==
=== As Daphne Clair ===
==== Single novels ====
- Return to Love (1977)
- Streak of Gold (1978)
- My Darling Clementina (1978)
- Jade Girl (1978)
- Jasmine Bride (1979)
- The Sleeping Fire (1979)
- Something Less Than Love (1979)
- A Wilder Shore (1980)
- Darling Deceiver (1980)
- Frozen Heart (1980)
- Loving Trap (1980)
- Never Count Tomorrow (1980)
- Dark Remembrance (1981)
- Promise to Pay (1981)
- Pacific Pretence (1982)
- Marriage under fire (1983)
- A Ruling Passion (1983)
- Take Hold of Tomorrow (1984)
- Dark Dream (1985)
- No Escape (1987)
- No Winner (1987)
- The Wayward Bride (1989)
- Flame on the Horizon (1993)
- Dark Mirror (1994)
- Infamous Bargain (1994)
- Edge of Deception (1995)
- Wilde Man (1996)
- Grounds for Marriage (1996)
- Wilde Heart (1996)
- Lover's Lies (1997)
- Reckless Engagement (1997)
- Carpenter's Mermaid (1997)
- Summer Seduction (1998)
- Wife to a Stranger (1998)
- Makeshift Marriage (1999)
- His Trophy Mistress (2001)
- The Marriage Debt (2002)
- Claiming His Bride (2003)
- The Determined Virgin (2003)
- The Brunellesci Baby (2004)

==== Year Down Under series (multi-author) ====
- And Then Came Morning (1992)

==== Expecting! series (multi-author) ====
- The Riccioni Pregnancy (2003)

==== Omnibus in collaboration ====
- The Jasmine Bride / Sweet Promise / Turbulent Covenant (1987) (with Janet Dailey and Jessica Steele)
- The Tycoon's Virgin (2007) (with Sandra Field and Cathy Williams)

==== Nonfiction ====
- Writing Romantic Fiction (1999) (with Robyn Donald)

=== As Laurey Bright ===
==== Single novels ====
- Tears of Morning (1981)
- Sweet Vengeance (1982)
- Deep Waters (1983)
- When Morning Comes (1984)
- Fetters of the Past (1984)
- Long Way from Home (1985)
- Rainbow Way (1987)
- Jacinth (1988)
- Sudden Sunlight (1989)
- Games of Chance (1989)
- A Guilty Passion (1990)
- The Older Man (1992)
- The Kindness of Strangers (1993)
- An Interrupted Marriage (1994)
- A Perfect Marriage (1995)
- Summer's Past (1996)
- The Wedding Ultimatum (2001)
- Shadowing Shahna (2002)
- Life with Riley (2002)
- With His Kiss (2003)
- Dangerous Waters (2003)
- Her Passionate Protector (2004)
- Wed in White (2007)

==== Conveniently Wed series (multi-author) ====
- The Mother of His Child (1999)

==== Virgin Brides series (multi-author) ====
- Marrying Marcus (2001)
- The Heiress Bride (2002)

==== Omnibus in collaboration ====
- Her Passionate Protector / Wanted (2004) (with Ruth Langan)
- Shadowing Shahna / Millionaire for Molly (2004) (with Marion Lennox)

=== As Claire Lorel ===
==== Single novels ====
- Lord Brandsley's Bride (1981)
- Miss Miranda's Marriage (1982)
- Huntersford (1999)

=== As Daphne de Jong ===
- Crossing the Bar (1998)
- Gather the Wind (1999)

==== Omnibus in collaboration ====
- Venus, Vagabonds and Miscellanea (1993) (with Ann Macrae and Anna Granger)

=== As Clarissa Garland ===
==== Single novel ====
- Return to Opal Reach (1998)

=== Non-fiction ===
- "Sweet Subversions" essay in Dangerous Men and Adventurous Women: Romance Writers on the Appeal of the Romance (1992, ISBN 0-8122-3192-9, 0-8122-1411-0)

== Awards ==
- Dying Light: Katherine Mansfield Memorial Award and others
- 1985 Lilian Ida Smith Award (non-fiction)

== References and resources ==
- Daphne Clair de Jong's Official Website
- Daphne Clair at Mills & Boon
