= Elizabeth Oldfield =

British writer (??–2010)

Nadine Hoskinson
- Died: 30 May 2010
- Occupation: Novelist
- Writing career
- Pen name: Elizabeth Oldfield
- Period: 1982–1998
- Genre: Romantic novel

Nadine Hoskinson (died 30 May 2010), well known as Elizabeth Oldfield was a popular British writer of over 40 romance novels in Mills & Boon from 1982 to 1998, when she retired from romance. In her sixties, she decided to return to writing, and was published again in 2007.

== Biography ==
Nadine Hoskinson married and had one daughter and one son. In the 1980s her husband's job took them to live in Singapore. She had articles published in magazines and newspapers in the United Kingdom and Singapore. Later, she decided to write a book, but thought first she would try a short book. The only short books that she had were Mills & Boon romances. Her first book was accepted in 1982 as Elizabeth Oldfield, and she continued writing for 18 years and 40 novels. She retired from writing in 1998 to travel with her husband. She died on 30 May 2010.

== Bibliography ==
=== Single novels ===
- Submission (1982)
- Second Time Around (1982)
- Dream Hero (1983)
- Florida Fever (1983)
- Beloved Stranger (1983)
- Take It or Leave It (1983)
- Fighting Lady (1984)
- Too Far Too Fast (1984)
- Rough and ready (1984)
- Ego Trap (1984)
- Dragon Man (1985)
- Sunstroke (1985)
- Bodycheck (1986)
- Bachelor in Paradise (1986)
- Beware of Married Men (1986)
- Close Proximity (1987)
- Touch and Go (1987)
- Quicksands (1987)
- Living Dangerously (1987)
- The Price of Passion (1989)
- Sparring Partners (1989)
- Rendezvous in Rio (1989)
- Love Gamble (1990)
- Flawed Hero (1990)
- An Accidental Affair (1990)
- Backlash (1991)
- Stay Until Dawn (1991)
- The Final Surrender (1992)
- Designed to Annoy (1993)
- Love's Prisoner (1994)
- Dark Victory (1994)
- Imperfect Stranger (1995)
- His Sleeping Partner (1996)
- Fast and Loose (1996)
- Intimate Relations (1996)
- Looking After Dad (1997)
- Solution, Seduction! (1997)
- Reluctant Father! (1997)
- The Bedroom Incident (1998)
- Vintage Babes (2007)

=== Postcards from Europe series (multi-author) ===
- Sudden Fire (1993)

=== Omnibus in Collaboration ===
- Bodyguards (1997) (with Sandra Field)
