= Yvonne Whittal =

South African-British novelist

- Born: South Africa
- Occupation: Novelist
- Writing career
- Period: 1975–present
- Genre: Romantic novel

Yvonne Whittal (b. South Africa) is a popular writer of 45 romance novels in Mills & Boon since 1975.

== Bibliography ==
=== Single novels ===
- East to Barryvale (1975)
- The Slender Thread (1976)
- Devil's Gateway (1977)
- Price of Happiness (1977)
- Where Seagulls Cry (1977)
- Handful of Stardust (1977)
- Magic of the Baobab (1978)
- Scars of Yesterday (1978)
- Broken Link (1978)
- Beloved Benefactor (1978)
- Love Is Eternal (1978)
- Bitter Enchantment (1979)
- Summer of the Weeping Rain (1979)
- Man from Amazibu Bay (1980)
- Silver Falcon (1980)
- Season of Shadows (1980)
- Dance of the Snake (1981)
- Light Within (1981)
- Where Two Ways Meet (1981)
- Lion of La Roche (1981)
- The Spotted Plume (1981)
- Bitter Sweet Waters (1982)
- Late Harvest (1982)
- House of Mirrors (1982)
- Web of Silk (1982)
- Chains of Gold (1983)
- Ride the Wind (1983)
- Dark Heritage (1983)
- Indesirable Miss Logan (1983)
- Echo in the Valley (1984)
- Cape of Misfortune (1984)
- The Devil's Pawn (1984)
- Wild Jasmine (1985)
- Moment in Time (1985)
- The Darker Side of Loving (1986)
- This One Night (1986)
- Sunset at Izilwane (1986)
- ElDorado (1987)
- There Is No Tomorrow (1987)
- Bid for Independence (1987)
- Too Long a Sacrifice (1988)
- Bridge to Nowhere (1989)
- Shadow Across the Moon (1990)
- Valley of the Devil (1991)
- Far Horizons (1992)
- Dare To Dream (2012)
- Remembrance of Love (2017)

=== Omnibus in collaboration ===
- Romance Treasury (1975) (with Karin Mutch and Susan Barrie)
- Intruder / Love's Puppet / Devil's Gateway (1983) (with Jane Donnelly and Henrietta Reid)
- The Enchanted Woods / To Begin Again / Handful of Stardust (1986) (with Katrina Britt and Jan MacLean)

== References and sources ==
- Yvonne Whittal's Webpage in Fantastic Fiction's Website
- Harlequin Enterprises Ltd's Website
