= Rosemary Carter =

American novelist

- Occupation: Novelist
- Writing career
- Period: 1975–2000
- Genre: Romantic novel

Rosemary Carter was a popular writer of 37 romance novels in Mills & Boon from 1975 to 2000.

== Bibliography ==
=== Single novels ===
- Land of the Flamenco (1975)
- Man of the Wild (1976)
- Forests of the Dragon (1976)
- Adam's Bride (1978)
- Sweet Imposter (1978)
- Bush Doctor (1978)
- The Awakening (1979)
- Return to Devil's View (1979)
- My Darling Spitfire (1979)
- Man in the Shadows (1979)
- Desert Dream (1980)
- Face in the Portrait (1980)
- Kelly's Man (1980)
- Another Life (1981)
- Safari Encounter (1981)
- Daredevil (1982)
- Master of Tinarva (1982)
- Serpent in Paradise (1983)
- Lion's Domain (1983)
- Letter from Bronze Mountain (1984)
- Impetuous Marriage (1985)
- A Forever Affair (1985)
- Pillow Portraits (1985)
- Walk into Tomorrow (1986)
- No Greater Joy (1988)
- Partners in Passion (1989)
- Echoes in the Night (1990)
- Certain of Nothing (1991)
- Captive Bride (1993)
- Night of the Scorpion (1993)
- Games Lovers Play (1994)
- Tender Captive (1996)
- Family Man (1996)
- Cowboy to the Altar (1997)
- A Husband Made in Texas (1997)
- A Wife and Child (1999)
- A Wife Worth Keeping (2000)

=== Collections ===
- 4 Titles By Carter: Pillow Portraits; Daredevil; The Awakening; Another Life (1995)

=== Omnibus in collaboration ===
- Romance Treasury (1987) (with Mary Burchell and Victoria Gordon) (Yours with Love; Man in the Shadows; The Everywhere Man)

== References and sources ==
- Harlequin Enterprises Ltd's Website
