= Simon Lewty =

English artist (1941–2021)

Simon Lewty (1941-2021) was an English artist. Lewty used many different layers in his work and mixed text with picture. Some of his work was based on a map of Warwickshire - where he used to live - and he drew pictures symbolizing his memories of the place.

== Early life ==
He was born in Sutton Coldfield in 1941. He attended Mid-Warwickshire School of Art, now Warwickshire College (1957–1960), Hornsey College of Art (1961–1963). He worked as a lecturer at the Mid-Warwickshire College of Further Education, (Warwickshire College), (1964–1981), before living and working in Leamington Spa, Warwickshire and in Swanage, Dorset.

== Monograph ==
The Self as a Stranger (2010) is a monograph on the work of Simon Lewty, Black Dog Publishing, London.
