= Jessica Steele =

British romance novelist (1933–2020)

- Born: 9 May 1933; Royal Leamington Spa, Warwickshire, England
- Died: 23 November 2020 (aged 87)
- Occupation: Novelist
- Spouse: Peter
- Writing career
- Pen name: Jessica Steele
- Period: 1979–2009
- Genre: Romantic novel
- Notable work: The Icicle Heart

Jessica Steele (9 May 1933 – 23 November 2020) was a British author of 88 romance novels that spanned a career over four decades, Her novels have been published by Mills & Boon since 1979 starting with The Icicle Heart. Her last novel was The Girl From Honeysuckle Farm and it was published in 2009.

== Biography ==
Steele was born in Royal Leamington Spa, Warwickshire, England. She worked initially as a clerk and she married in 1967. She travelled to Hong Kong, China, Mexico, Japan, Peru, Russia, Egypt, Chile and Greece in order to establish a background for her novels. Steele died on 23 November 2020, at the age of 87.

== Bibliography ==
=== Single novels ===
- The Icicle Heart (1979)
- Hostage to Dishonour (1979)
- Hostile Engagement (1979)
- Spring Girl (1979)
- Pride's Master (1979)
- Intimate Friends (1979)
- The Other Woman (1980)
- Turbulent Covenant (1980)
- Magic of His Kiss (1980)
- Price to be Met (1980)
- Devil in Disguise (1980)
- Innocent Abroad (1981)
- Bachelor's Wife (1981)
- Gallant Antagonist (1981)
- Other Brother (1981)
- But Know Not Why (1982)
- Dishonest Woman (1982)
- Distrust Her Shadow (1982)
- No Quiet Refuge (1983)
- Reluctant Relative (1983)
- Tethered Liberty (1983)
- Intimate Enemies (1983)
- Tomorrow - Come Soon (1983)
- Bond of Vengeance (1984)
- Ruthless in all (1984)
- Imprudent Challenge (1984)
- Facade (1984)
- No Holds Barred (1984)
- No Honourable Compromise (1985)
- Promise to Dishonour (1985)
- So Near, So Far (1986)
- Misleading Encounter (1986)
- Beyond Her Control (1986)
- Relative Strangers (1987)
- Unfriendly Alliance (1987)
- Fortunes of Love (1988)
- Without Love (1988)
- When the Loving Stopped (1988)
- To Stay Forever (1989)
- Farewell to Love (1989)
- Frozen Enchantment (1989)
- Unfriendly Proposition (1989)
- Passport to Happiness (1990)
- Hidden Heart (1990)
- A First Time for Everything (1990)
- Bad Neighbours (1991)
- Without Knowing Why (1991)
- Flight of Discovery (1991)
- Runaway from Love (1991)
- His Woman (1991)
- Destined to Meet (1992)
- Hungarian Rhapsody (1992)
- Italian Invader (1993)
- Relative Values (1993)
- West of Bohemia (1993)
- Heartless Pursuit (1995)
- With His Ring (1996)
- A Business Engagement (1997)
- The Trouble with Trent! (1997)
- Temporary Girlfriend (1997)
- A Most Eligible Bachelor (1998)
- Nine-to-five Affair (1999)
- After Hours (1999)
- The Bachelor's Bargain (1999)
- A Suitable Husband (2001)
- His Pretend Mistress (2002)
- An Accidental Engagement (2003)
- A Pretend Engagement (2004)
- A Most Suitable Wife (2005)
- Promise Of A Family (2006)
- The Boss and His Secretary (2007)
- Engaged to Be Married? (2008)
- Her Hand In Marriage (2008)
- Falling for Her Convenient Husband (2009)
- The Girl from Honeysuckle Farm (2009)

=== Fereday Twins Series ===
1. The Sister Secret (1995)
2. A Wife in Waiting (1996)

=== The Marriage Pledge Series ===
1. The Feisty Fiance (2000)
2. Bachelor in Need (2000)
3. Marriage in Mind (2000)

=== Kids & Kisses Series Multi-Author ===
- Bachelor's Family (1995)

=== Today's Woman Series Multi-Author ===
- The Marriage Business (1995)

=== Family Ties Series Multi-Author ===
- The Sister Secret (1995)

=== Holding Out for a Hero Multi-Author ===
- Unexpected Engagement (1996)

=== Whirlwind Weddings Multi-Author ===
- Married in a Moment (1998)

=== Marrying The Boss Series Multi-Author ===
- Agenda, Attraction! (1998)

=== White Weddings Series Multi-Author ===
- A Wedding Worth Waiting for (1999)

=== To Have and To Hold Series Multi-Author ===
- Part-Time Marriage (2001)

=== Nine to Five Series Multi-Author ===
- A Professional Marriage (2002)
- Her Boss's Marriage Agenda (2004)

=== High Society Brides Multi-Author ===
- A Paper Marriage (2003)

=== Contract Brides Series Multi-Author ===
- Vacancy: Wife of Convenience (2005)

=== Collections ===
- 9 to 5 (1998)
- Misleading Encounter / Fortunes of Love (2004)
- Feisty Fiancee / Bachelor in Need (2005)

=== Omnibus In Collaboration ===
- The Jasmine Bride / Sweet Promise / Turbulent Covenant (1987) (with Daphne Clair and Janet Dailey)
- Island of Escape / Stormy Affair / Hostile Engagement (1987) (with Dorothy Cork and Margaret Mayo)
- Trodden Paths / Voyage of the Mistral / Innocent Abroad (1989) (with Jacqueline Gilbert and Madeleine Ker)
- Contract Husbands (2003) (with Helen Brooks and Catherine George)
- Marrying the Boss (2003) (with Helen Brooks and Alison Roberts)
- White Wedding (2004) (with Judy Christenberry and Margaret Way)
- A Christmas To Remember (2004) (with Debbie Macomber and Betty Neels)
- All I Want for Christmas... (2005) (with Betty Neels and Margaret Way)
- After Office Hours... (2006) (with Helen Brooks and Lee Wilkinson)
- Bedded by Her Boss (2007) (with Amanda Browning and Sharon Kendrick)
- Mistress by Persuasion (2008) (with Robyn Donald and Lee Wilkinson)
- The Boss's Proposal (2008) (with Patricia Thayer and Margaret Way)
