= Mary Wibberley =

English romantic fiction writer

- Born: c. 1934; Worsley, England, United Kingdom
- Died: 29 December 2013 (aged 79)
- Occupation: Novelist
- Writing career
- Period: 1973–2013
- Genre: Romance

Mary Wibberley (c. 1934 – 29 December 2013) was an English romantic fiction writer. Born in Worsley, she wrote 48 novels for Mills & Boon. Her first novel, Black Niall, was published in 1973. Wibberley died following a short illness on 29 December 2013, aged 79. Her funeral took place on 30 December.
