= Eleanor Farnes =

British writer

Grace Rutherford
- Born: Grace Tomlins; 1906
- Died: 1989 (aged 82–83)
- Occupation: Novelist
- Spouse: yes
- Children: 2
- Writing career
- Pen name: Eleanor Farnes
- Language: English
- Period: 1935–1979
- Genre: Romance

Eleanor Farnes was the pen name of Grace Rutherford, a British writer of over 60 romance novels at Mills & Boon from 1935 to 1979.

== Career ==
Eleanor Farnes lived in England, but her family had a home in Spain, where she also spend part of each year. She also traveled widely in Europe, South Africa, and North America. She started to write after marrying and having 2 children.

== Personal life ==
Her hobbies included the restoring of old houses and traveling, that had brought the charm and beauty of exotic locales to her novels, like Spain, Italy or Switzerland, that she knew personally. She also wrote doctor/nurse romances.

== Bibliography ==
=== Single novels ===
- Merry Goes the Time (1935)
- Tangled Harmonies (1936)
- Three Happy Pilgrims (1937)
- Romantic Medley (1938)
- The Crystal Spring (1938)
- I Walk the Mountain Tops (1940)
- Bloom on the Gorse (1941)
- Fruits of the Year (1942)
- Reckless Adventure (1942)
- Summer Motley (1943)
- The Doctor's Wife (1943)
- Brief Excursion (1944)
- The Quiet Valley (1944)
- Stormcloud and Sunrise (1945)
- Journey for Two Travellers (1946)
- Mistress of the House (1946)
- The Deep, Wide River (1947)
- The Opening Flower (1948)
- The Faithless Friend (1949)
- The Wayward Stream (1949)
- Captive Daughter (1950)
- The Dream and the Dancer (1951)
- The Golden Peaks (1951)
- The House by the Lake (1952)
- Magic Symphony (1952)
- A Home for Jocelyn (1953)
- The Wings of Memory (1953)
- The Young Intruder (1953)
- Sister of the Housemaster (1954)
- Song of Summer (1954) aka Doctor's Orders
- The Fortunes of Springfield (1955)
- Secret Heiress (1956)
- The Constant Heart (1956)
- The Happy Enterprise (1959)
- The Flight of the Swan (1959)
- The Painted Ceiling (1960)
- The Red Cliffs (1961)
- Lover's Meeting (1962)
- A Change of Heart (1963) aka Doctor Max
- The Tangled Web (1963)
- The Daring Deception (1965)
- The Stepsisters (1966)
- The Pursuit and the Capture (1967)
- The Rose and the Thorn (1968)
- Loving and Giving (1968)
- Rubies for My Love (1969)
- The Doctor's Circle (1970)
- Enchanted Island (1970)
- A Castle in Spain (1971)
- A Serpent in Eden (1971)
- The Valley of the Eagles (1972)
- Shadow of Suspicion (1972)
- The Runaway Visitors (1973)
- Splendid Legacy (1973)
- Homeward Bound (1975)
- The Gold and the Dross (1976)
- Mistaken Identity (1976)
- Amaranth Flower (1979)

=== Collections in collaboration ===
- The Surgeon's Marriage / The Only Charity / The Golden Peaks (1964) (with Kathryn Blair and Sara Seale)
- Doctor Max / Cameron of Gare / Dear Adversary (1970) (with Kathryn Blair and Jean S. MacLeod)
- Portrait of Susan / Doctor's Orders / Love Him or Leave Him (1971) (with Rosalind Brett and Mary Burchell)
- The Enchanted Island / The Kindled Fire / Rising Star (1975) (with Essie Summers and Kay Thorpe)
- Runaway Visitors / Tower of the Winds/ Rest is Magic (1977) (with Elizabeth Hunter and Marjorie Lewty)
