= Gloria Bevan =

Australian-born New Zealand writer

Gloria Isabel Bevan (20 July 1911 - 1998.) was an Australian-born New Zealand writer of romantic fiction.

== Early life ==
Bevan was born on 20 July 1911 in Kalgoorlie, Australia, where her father was a mining engineer. When she was three years old, the family moved to New Zealand, and lived in Auckland from 1926 to 1936. She attended Auckland Technical College.

== Career ==
After finishing her high school studies, Bevan worked as a typist while writing stories in her spare time. Her first published works were detective novels, written under the pseudonym Fiona Murray, in 1965. She later met fellow New Zealand romance writer Essie Summers, who introduced her to Allan Boon of Mills & Boon publishers. From 1969 to 1992 she wrote 25 contemporary romance novels for Mills & Boon, which were published under her own name. Her books were considered "wholesome", and focused almost exclusively on the hero-heroine relationship.

=== Personal life ===
Bevan married in 1937 and had three daughters.
