= Roumelia Lane =

British writer

Kay Green
- Born: 31 December 1927; Bradford, Yorkshire, England, UK
- Spouse: Gavin Frederick Green
- Children: 2
- Writing career
- Pen name: Roumelia Lane, Florissa May, Guy Granger, Katie Kent, Harley Davis
- Language: English
- Period: 1967–1997
- Genre: Romance

Roumelia Lane was the pseudonym of Kay Green (born 31 December 1927), under which she was a British writer of over 35 romance novels for Mills & Boon from 1967 to 1997. Other pseudonyms she used were Florissa May, Guy Granger, Katie Kent, and Harley Davis.

== Biography ==
Green was born on 31 December 1927 in Bradford, Yorkshire, England, UK. On 1 October 1949, she married Gavin Frederick Green, they had a son and a daughter.

== Bibliography ==
=== As Roumelia Lane ===
==== Single novels ====
- Rose of the Desert (1967)
- Hideaway Heart (1967)
- Summer to Love (1968)
- Sea of Zanj (1969)
- Terminus Tehran (1969)
- The Scented Hills (1970)
- Café Mimosa (1971)
- In the Shade of the Palms (1972)
- Nurse at Noongwalla (1973)
- Across the Lagoon (1974)
- Stormy Encounter (1974)
- Harbour of Deceit (1975)
- Where the Moonflower Weaves (1975)
- Tenant of San Mateo (1976)
- Hideaway Heath (1976)
- Bamboo Wedding (1977)
- Himalayan Moonlight (1977)
- The Brightest Star (1978)
- Hidden Rapture (1978)
- Second Spring (1980)
- Dream Island (1981)
- Desert Haven (1981)
- Lupin Valley (1982)
- Fires of Heaven (1983)
- Summer of Conflict (1984)
- Night of the Beguine (1985)
- Master of Her Fate (1986)
- Tempest in the Tropics (1986)
- Call of the Cobra (1993)
- Nawindi Flyer (1993)
- Heartbreak Island (1994)
- Stardust (1995)
- Danger in Paradise (1997)

==== Romance Around the World Series Multi-Author ====
- House of the Winds (1968)

==== Collections ====
- House of Winds / Summer to Love / Sea of Zanj (1979)

==== Omnibus in collaboration ====
- Sister of the Bride / Scented Hills / Feast of the Candles (1976) (with Iris Danbury and Henrietta Reid)

=== As Katie Kent ===
==== Single novels ====
- Adventures of Hugglemush (1991)

=== As Guy Granger ===
==== Single novels ====
- Tiddly Wink Man (1993)
- Diamond Machine (1994)
