= Jane Donnelly =

British novelist

- Occupation: Novelist
- Writing career
- Pen name: Jane Donnelly
- Period: 1965–2000
- Genre: Romantic novel

Jane Donnelly is a British writer. During period of 1965 to 2000, she wrote more than 60 romance novels from Mills & Boon. Her novels are characterized as "happy escapist reading".

== Bibliography ==
=== Single novels ===
- Don't Look Back (1965)
- A Man Apart (1968)
- Don't Walk Alone (1968)
- This Hell Called Love (1969)
- Shadows from the Sea (1969)
- Whispering Ones (1969)
- Stranger in the Dark (1969)
- Take the Far Dream (1970)
- Man in the Next Room (1970)
- Never Turn Back (1970)
- Half Way to the Stars (1971)
- Mill in the Meadow (1972)
- Stranger Came (1972)
- The Long Shadow (1973)
- Rocks Under Shining Water (1973)
- Man Called Mallory (1974)
- Collision Course (1975)
- The Man Outside (1975)
- Ride Out the Storm (1975)
- Dark Pursuer (1976)
- Silver Cage (1976)
- The Intruder (1976)
- Four Weeks in Winter (1977)
- Dear Caliban (1977)
- Touched by Fire (1977)
- Black Hunter (1978)
- Love for a Stranger (1978)
- Spell of the Seven Stones (1978)
- Forest of the Night (1978)
- Behind a Closed Door (1979)
- A Savage Sanctuary (1979)
- A Man to Watch (1979)
- No Way Out (1980)
- When Lightning Strikes (1980)
- So Long a Winter (1981)
- Flashpoint (1981)
- Frozen Jungle (1981)
- Diamond Cut Diamond (1982)
- Call Up the Storm (1983)
- Face the Tiger (1983)
- A Fierce Encounter (1983)
- Moon Lady (1984)
- Ring of Crystal (1985)
- To Cage a Whirlwind (1985)
- Ride a Wild Horse (1986)
- Force Field (1987)
- No Place to Run (1987)
- Fetters of Gold (1988)
- When We're Alone (1989)
- The Jewels of Helen (1990)
- Devil's Flower (1990)
- Once a Cheat (1991)
- The Trespasser (1992)
- Hold Back the Dark (1993)
- Shadow of a Tiger (1994)
- Cover Story (1994)
- Sleeping Beauty (1995)
- Living with Marc (1996)
- Max's Proposal (1998)
- A Very Private Man (1999)
- Fiance for Real (2000)

=== Collections ===
- The First Anthology of Three Harlequin Romances by Jane Donnelly (1982)

=== Omnibus in collaboration ===
- Dear Caliban / Heart of the Eagle / Swans' Reach (1978) (with Elizabeth Graham and Margaret Way)
- The Man Outside / Castles in Spain / McCabe's Kingdom (1979) (with Rebecca Stratton and Margaret Way)
- Parade of Peacocks / Never Turn Back / Pirate of the Sun (1979) (with Elizabeth Ashton and Gwen Westwood)
- Desert Castle / Collision Course / Ride A Black Horse (1980) (with Isobel Chace and Margaret Pargeter)
- The Shifting Sands / Portrait of Jaime / Touched by Fire (1982) (with Kay Thorpe and Margaret Way)
- Intruder / Love's Puppet / Devil's Gateway (1983) (with Henrietta Reid and Yvonne Whittal)
- The Master Fiddler / Forest of the Night / Rightful Possession (1988) (with Janet Dailey and Sally Wentworth)
