= Margaret Pargeter =

20th-century romance novelist (1925–2023)

- Born: Margaret Appleby; 10 October 1925; Longhorsley, Northumberland, England
- Died: 11 February 2023 (aged 97); Morpeth, Northumberland, England
- Occupation: Novelist
- Writing career
- Period: 1975–1986, 1997
- Genre: Romantic novels

Margaret Pargeter (née Appleby; 10 October 1925 – 11 February 2023) was a British romance novelist. Between 1975 and 1986, she published 49 romance novels with Harlequin and Mills & Boon, including titles such as Hold Me Captive and Boomerang Bride. As of 1986, she was one of the most widely read authors in Britain, according to the Public Lending Right scheme. Her first full-length novel, Misconception, was published in 1997 by Scarlet.

== Early life ==
Pargeter was born Margaret Appleby in Northumberland, England, on 10 October 1925. Her father was a farmer in the Northumbrian Valley. She started writing in her early teens, always carrying a notebook in her pocket so she could write stories and poems between chores on Smallburn Farm. During the Second World War, she was a volunteer in the fire-fighting section of the Air Raid Precautions.

== Career ==
In 1973, Pargeter had her first major break as a writer when her husband urged her to enter a writing competition advertised in the newspaper by a Scottish publishing firm. Although she did not win the romantic story competition, the editor liked her style and asked her to write serial stories. The publisher, Thompsons of Dundee, published a mystery story by Pargeter. The experience gave her the confidence to write her first 66,000-word novel, originally titled Music in the Wind, and submit it to Mills & Boon, who accepted it. The novel was set in the Hebrides where her family spent many holidays.

By the time her first romance novel, Winds from the Sea, was published in 1975, Pargeter had a contract to publish two more. Between 1975 and 1986, Pargeter published 49 romance novels with Mills & Boon in the United Kingdom, and with Harlequin in Canada. In 1997, her 50th book and first full-length novel, Misconception, was published by Scarlet.

== Personal life ==
Pargeter lived in Longhorsley near Morpeth. Her husband Leslie, a building engineer, died in 1976 as a result of industrial exposure to asbestos. They had two sons. She died at home, aged 97, on 11 February 2023.

== Analysis ==
In an analysis of the author's works, Arlene Moore argued that Pargeter had developed a distinctive style over the course of her career, "drawing on modern 'literary' techniques of writing". She highlighted Pargeter's use of "inner turmoil as a constant counter-point as the heroine reacts to events in the novel", with plots that were "generally complicated as are her characters" as she "maintains near melodramatic levels of stress" throughout.

Moore characterizes Pargeter's early novels such as Better to Forget (1977) and Ride a Black Horse (1975) as more "traditional" in their conflicts and reactions, while her later novels had the "heightened emotionalism" that became her trademark. In The Devil's Bride (1979), the heroine Sandra is forced to marry her cousin's fiancé who has been blinded in a skiing accident, after being coerced by her cousin into deceiving him. Her new husband, a well-known writer, forces her to return to Greece with him, and treats her vindictively as he takes out his anger and frustrations on her. Despite the constant conflict, she grows to love him.

In Boomerang Bride (1979), the male character Wade deeply resents his grandfather who desperately wants an heir to continue running their station in the outback. To spite him, Wade marries Vicki, a temporary home helper whom he considers "very ineligible", as a mutually agreed business arrangement. Although he is desperate not to have children, they succumb to passion. Vicki becomes pregnant and is sent away by her angry husband, only to return four years later with their son, Graham.

In an analysis of Harlequin romances, Tania Modleski quotes extensively from Hold Me Captive (1976). Modleski identifies common tropes within Harlequin romances that are evident in Pargeter's work, including the "more or less brutal" hero whose brutality must be explained by the novel, as well as the heroine's latent "anxiety about rape and longings for power and revenge", underlying an apparent "desire to be taken by force".

In an analysis of Western "desert romances" and their exotification of sheiks, Evelyn Bach examines Pargeter's The Jewelled Caftan (1978). Bach notes that the heroine is suspicious of a sheik she meets who is "clean and literate", which runs counter to her expectations; ironically, when the hero's part-French lineage is finally revealed, this somehow redeems him in the heroine's eyes.

== List of romance novels ==
Title	Mills & Boone	Harlequin	Scarlet
Winds from the Sea	1975		
The Killed Stranger	1975	1976	
Ride a Black Horse	1975	1976	
Stormy Rapture	1976		
Hold Me Captive	1976		
Blue Skies, Dark Waters	1976	1977	
Better to Forget	1977	1978	
Never Go Back	1977		
Flamingo Moon	1977	1978	
Wild Inheritance	1977	1978	
The Jewelled Caftan	1978		
A Man Called Cameron	1978		
Marriage Impossible	1978		
Midnight Magic	1978		
The Wild Rowan	1978	1979	
Autumn Song	1979		
Boomerang Bride	1979	1981	
The Devil's Bride	1979		
Only You	1979		
Savage Possession	1979	1980	
Kiss of a Tyrant	1980		
Deception	1980	1981	
Dark Surrender	1980	1981	
The Dark Oasis	1980	1981	
The Loving Slave	1981	1982	
Captivity	1981		
Collision	1981		
At First Glance	1981		
Substitute Bride	1981	1983	
Man from the Kimberleys	1982	1983	
Not Far Enough	1982		
Prelude to a Song	1982	1983	
Storm Cycle	1982		
Storm in the Night	1983	1984	
Clouded Rapture	1983		
Chains of Regret	1983		
Caribbean Gold	1983		
The Demetrious Line	1983		
The Silver Flame	1983		
Born of the Wind	1984		
The Odds Against	1984		
Captive of Fate	1985		
Impasse	1985		
Total Surrender	1985		
Lost Enchantment	1985		
Model of Deception	1985		
The Other Side of Paradise	1985		
Beyond Reach	1986		
A Scarlet Woman	1986		
Misconception			1997

Sources: Twentieth Century Romance and Historical Writers (1994); Misconception (1997)
