= Margaret Malcolm =

British writer

Margaret Lilian Malcolm
- Born: Margaret Lilian Graham; 17 January 1900; Barnet, Middlesex, England
- Died: 11 December 1980 (aged 80); Croydon, London, England
- Occupation: Novelist
- Writing career
- Pen name: Margaret Malcolm
- Language: English
- Period: 1940–1981
- Genre: Romance novel

Margaret Lilian Malcolm (née Graham, 17 January 1900 – 11 December 1980) was a British writer of over 100 romance novels published by Mills & Boon from 1940 to 1981.

== Bibliography ==
- Love Without Wings (1940) a.k.a. Surgeon's Wife
- Loving Heart (1940)
- One Stopped at Home (1941)
- Where Fairy Tales End (1941)
- The Healing Touch (1942) a.k.a. Village Hospital
- Spring of Love (1942)
- The Enchanted Years (1943)
- Kind and Gentle is She (1944) a.k.a. Dr. Gregory Misunderstands
- The Master of Normanhurst (1944)
- April's Doubting Day (1945)
- Heart's Desire (1945)
- The Steadfast Flame (1945)
- A Heart to Pity (1946)
- No Cure For Love (1946)
- The Thorny Rose (1946)
- Folly Hall (1947)
- Love is a Gift (1947)
- First in my Heart (1948)
- Melody in Tune (1948)
- Without Any Amazement (1948)
- A Stranger is My Love (1949)
- Listen To Me! (1949)
- The Proud House (1949)
- The Stars Still Shine (1949)
- Can This Be Love? (1950)
- My Tender Fury (1950)
- That Eagle's Fate (1951)
- The Faithful Rebel (1951)
- The Tempered Wind (1951)
- The Uncharted Ocean (1951)
- Tomorrow's Flower (1951)
- Until You Came (1952) a.k.a. Hope for the Doctor
- Darkness Surrounds Me (1952)
- Heart in Hand (1952)
- Beloved Tyrant (1953) a.k.a. Dear Tyrant
- All That Is Mine (1953)
- Cherish This Wayward Heart (1953)
- More Than All the World (1953)
- Precious Vagabond (1954)
- The Man in Homespun (1954)
- The Walled Garden (1954)
- Sweeter than my Dreams (1955) a.k.a. A Doctor for Diana
- The Enemy in His House (1957) a.k.a. Nurse in the House
- Fortune Goes Begging (1958) a.k.a. Nurse Langridge, Heiress
- Marriage by Agreement (1958)
- Broken Harmony (1960)
- Jan Marlowe, Hospital Librarian (1960)
- Meadowsweet (1960)
- The Willing Prisoner (1960)
- Fragrant Harvest (1961)
- Galleon House (1961)
- Marriage Compromise (1961)
- Brief Summer (1962)
- Little Savage (1962)
- Desolate Paradise (1963)
- Leave Me No More (1963)
- Scatterbrains – Student Nurse (1963)
- Send for Nurse Vincent (1963)
- My Valiant Fledgling (1964)
- The Poor Relation (1964)
- All Our Tomorrows (1965)
- Crosswinds (1965)
- Dear Distraction (1965)
- Doctor Sandy (1965)
- Kit Cavendish – Private Nurse (1965)
- The Lonely Road (1965)
- Mistress of Greylairs (1966)
- New Town Neighbours (1966)
- Yours Sincerely, Caroline (1966)
- Johnny Next Door (1967)
- No Place Apart (1967)
- The Joyous Invader (1967)
- Yours for the Finding (1967)
- The House of Yesterday (1968)
- Star Dust (1968/10)
- The Head of the House (1969/03)
- So Enchanting an Enemy (1969/06)
- The Turning Tide (1969/11)
- Next Door to Romance (1970/05)
- Those Endearing Young Charms (1970/10)
- This Tangled Web (1971/07)
- Hunter from the Hills (1971/10)
- Not Less Than All (1972/03)
- No More a'Roving (1972/07)
- Sunshine on the Mountains (1972/10)
- The House on the Cliffs (1973/05)
- Unpredictable Tremaynes (1973/07)
- None to Dispute (1973/10)
- Return to Blytheburn (1974/01)
- A Bright Particular Star (1974/07)
- The Hearthfire Glows (1975/11)
- Flight to Fantasy (1976/08)
- Dangerous Haven (1977/03)
- Hive for the Honey Bee (1977/06)
- Each Song Twice Over (1978/08)
- Summer's Lease (1978/11)
- Valley of Delight (1979/01)
- Bowman's Acre (1980/04)
- So Deep is the Ocean (1980/08)
- Eagles Fly Alone (1981/01)
