= Marjorie Lewty =

British writer

Marjorie Lobb Lewty
- Born: Marjorie Lobb; 8 April 1906; Wallasey, Cheshire, England, United Kingdom
- Died: 21 January 2002 (aged 95)
- Occupation: Novelist
- Spouse: Richard Arthur Lewty (1933–1978)
- Children: 2
- Writing career
- Pen name: Marjorie Lewty
- Period: 1988-2003
- Genre: Romantic novel

Marjorie Lewty, née Lobb (8 April 1906 in Wallasey, Cheshire, England, United Kingdom – 21 January 2002) was a British writer of short stories and over 45 romance novels from 1958 to 1999 for Mills & Boon.

== Biography ==
Marjorie Lobb was born on 8 April 1906 in Wallasey, Cheshire, England, United Kingdom, the daughter of James, a sailor in the Merchant Navy, and Mabel, the manager of the Queen's Cinema in Liverpool. She studied at Queen Mary High School in Liverpool, but her plans to study sciences at university were thwarted when her father died. She was forced to take a hated job as secretary of the District Bank Ltd. from 1923 to 1933, when she married Richard Arthur Lewty, a dental surgeon of Liverpool. They had one son Simon Lewty, and one daughter, Deborah (Bornoff). After her marriage, she began to write short stories that were published in magazines. In 1958, she sold her first romance novel to Mills & Boon, and her last novel in 1999. Her husband died in 1978, and she died on 21 January 2002.

== Bibliography ==
=== Single novels ===
- Never Call It Loving (1958)
- The Million Stars (1959)
- Imperfect Secretary (1959)
- The Lucky One (1961)
- This Must Be for Ever (1962)
- Alex Rayner, Dental Nurse (1965)
- Dental Nurse at Denley's (1968)
- Town Nurse – Country Nurse (1970)
- The Extraordinary Engagement (1972)
- Rest Is Magic (1973)
- All Made of Wishes (1974)
- Flowers in Stony Places (1975)
- Fire in the Diamond (1976)
- To Catch a Butterfly (1977)
- Time and the Loving (1977)
- The Short Engagement (1978)
- A Very Special Man (1979)
- A Certain Smile (1979)
- Prisoner in Paradise (1980)
- Love Is a Dangerous Game (1980)
- Beyond the Lagoon (2016)
- Girl Betwitched (1981)
- Makeshift Marriage (1982)
- Dangerous Male (1983)
- One Who Kisses (1983)
- Lover's Knot (1984)
- Riviera Romance (1984)
- Acapulco Moonlight (1985)
- Lake in Kyoto (1985)
- Villa in the sun (1986)
- In Love with the Man (1986)
- Honeymoon Island (1987)
- Bittersweet Honeymoon (1988)
- Falling in Love Again (1988)
- Kiss Is Still a Kiss (1989)
- Lightning Strike (1990)
- Man-trap (1990)
- Deep Water (1991)
- The Beginning of the Affair (1992)
- Little White Lies (1993)
- Step in the Dark (1994)
- An Ambitious Heart (1995)
- Misleading Engagement (1996)
- A Real Engagement (1999)

=== Omnibus in collaboration ===
- Runaway Visitors / Tower of the Winds / Rest is Magic (1977) (with Eleanor Farnes and Elizabeth Hunter)
- Shadows on the Sand / All Made of Wishes / Sweet Roots and Honey (1979) (with Elizabeth Hoy and Gwen Westwood)
- Velvet Spur / The Habit of Love / Extraordinary Engagement (1979) (with Jane Arbor and Joyce Dingwell)
- Flowers in Stony Places / The Flight of the Hawk / Ross of Silver Ridge (1981) (with Rebecca Stratton and Gwen Westwood)
- The Beach of Sweet Returns / To Catch a Butterfly / Heart in the Sunlight (1982) (with Margery Hilton)
- The House in the Foothills / The Short Engagement / Henrietta's Own Castle (1986) (with Mons Daveson and Betty Neels)

== References and sources ==
- Harlequin Enterprises Ltd
