= Shiloh Walker =

American writer

Shiloh Walker (born 1976) is an American author of contemporary and erotic romance novels and novellas. She has written under the pen name J.C. Daniels.

== Biography ==
Walker was born in 1976 in Louisville, Kentucky. Early in her career, Walker worked as a nurse. She began her writing career with her first works published as e-books. In 2003, her first book—a romance titled Her Best Friend's Lover—was digitally published by Ellora's Cave. Walker has self-published works under the pseudonym J.C. Daniels. Her works have been published by Berkley Publishing and Samhain.

Inspired by Bunnicula to write about vampires, Walker often writes in the paranormal romance sub-genre.

She lives with her family in the Midwest.

== Bibliography ==
=== As Shiloh Walker ===
==== Novels ====
- Her Best Friend's Lover (2003)
- Once Upon A Midnight Blue (2004) – Also in More Than Magick
- Touch Of Gypsy Fire (2004)
- For the Love of Jazz (2004)
- Coming in Last (2004)
- Every Last Fantasy (2004) – Also in Christmas Wishes
- His Christmas Cara (2004) – Also in Christmas Wishes and All She Wants
- The Redeeming (2004)
- No Longer Mine (2005) – Loosely connected to Her Best Friend's Lover
- Telling Tales (2005)
- His Every Desire (2007)
- One of the Guys (2007) – Also in Whispered Secrets
- Always Yours (2007)
- Love, Lies and Murder (2007)
- Drastic Measures (2008)
- Beautiful Girl (2008)
- Vicious Vixen (2008)
- Guilty Needs (2009)
- One Night With You (2009)
- Playing for Keeps (2009) – Also in Lost in Love
- Chains (2009)
- My Lady (2009)
- Djinn's Wish (2009) – Also in A Wish, a Kiss, a Dream
- Never As It Seems (2010)
- Beg Me (2010) – Also in Bound Temptations (2-in-1)
- A Present for Christmas (2010)
- Under Your Spell (2010)
- Guilty Obsessions (2010)
- Tempt Me (2011) – Also in Bound Temptations (2-in-1)
- A Forever Kind of Love (2011) – Also in Lost in Love
- Stolen (2012)
- Beautiful Scars (2013)
- You Own Me (2014) – Also in Branded and Deceptions: A Collection
- Lacey's Game (2014)
- The Virgin's Night Out (2015) – Also in Branded
- Avalon (2016)
- Pieces of Me (2017)
- Sexy Little Secrets (2018)
- Spectre (2019)
- Don't Walk Away (??)

==== Non-fiction ====
- The Untamed – Not a Parody, More like a Manual. Or a Statement: An Essay on What is and isn't Taboo in Romance (2017)

==== The Hunters ====
| # | Title | Date Published | Also In | Comments |
|---|---|---|---|---|
| 0.5 | The Huntress | 2006 | Legends: Hunters and Heroes | |
| 0.6 | Malachi | 2006 | Legends: Hunters and Heroes | |
| 1 | Declan and Tori | 2003 | Hunters: The Beginning The Hunters Series: Boxed Set Books 1-5 | |
| 2 | Eli and Sarel | 2003 | Hunters: The Beginning The Hunters Series: Boxed Set Books 1-5 | |
| 3 | Byron and Kit | 2004 | Hunters: Interlude The Hunters Series: Boxed Set Books 1-5 | |
| 4 | Jonathan and Lori | 2004 | Hunters: Interlude The Hunters Series: Boxed Set Books 1-5 | |
| 5 | Ben and Shadoe | 2005 | The Hunters Series: Boxed Set Books 1-5 | |
| 6 | Rafe and Sheila | 2005 | | |
| 7 | I'll Be Hunting You | 2005 | | |
| 8 | Hunting the Hunter | 2006 | | |
| 9 | Malachi & Kelsey | 2007 | Heart and Soul | |
| 10 | Mike & Leandra | 2007 | Heart and Soul | |
| 11 | Hunter's Salvation | 2007 | | |
| 12 | Hunter's Need | 2009 | | |
| 13 | Hunter's Fall | 2011 | | |
| 14 | Hunter's Rise | 2012 | | |
| | Hunter's Choice | 2010 | Mammoth Book of Vampire Romance | short story |
| | Hunter's Edge | 2008 | | short story |
| | Hunter's Pride | 2006 | | short story |
| | Belonging | 2009 | | short story |
| | Hunt Me | 2011 | Deceptions: A Collection | short story |

==== The FBI Psychics ====
| # | Title | Date Published | Also In |
|---|---|---|---|
| 0.5 | Talking with the Dead | 2006 | Second Chances |
| 1 | The Missing | 2008 | |
| 2 | The Departed | 2012 | |
| 3 | The Reunited | 2013 | |
| 3.25 | Il gioco dei sensi | 2012 | |
| 3.5 | The Unwanted | 2013 | The Forsaken |
| 4 | The Protected | 2013 | |
| 4.5 | The Innocent | 2014 | The Forsaken |
| 5 | The Doubted | 2018 | |
| | The Unwilling | 2012 | Hot in Handcuffs |

==== The Ash Trilogy ====
1. If You Hear Her (2011)
2. If You See Her (2012)
3. If You Know Her (2012)

==== Rafferty ====
1. Fragile (2009)
2. Broken (2010)

==== Grimm's Circle ====
| # | Title | Date Published | Also In |
|---|---|---|---|
| 0.5 | All the Time in the World | 2011 | |
| 1 | Candy Houses | 2009 | The First Book of Grimm Grimm's Circle: Books 1-3 |
| 2 | No Prince Charming | 2009 | The First Book of Grimm Grimm's Circle: Books 1-3 |
| 2.5 | I Thought It Was You | 2010 | |
| 3 | Crazed Hearts | 2010 | The Second Book of Grimm Grimm's Circle: Books 1-3 |
| 4 | Tarnished Knight | 2010 | The Second Book of Grimm |
| 5 | Locked in Silence | 2011 | |
| 6 | Grimm Tidings | 2012 | The Third Book of Grimm |
| 7 | Blind Destiny | 2012 | The Third Book of Grimm |
| 8 | Furious Fire | 2014 | |
| 9 | Grimm's End | 2015 | |

==== Barnes Brothers ====
1. Wrecked (2013)
2. Razed (2014)
3. Busted (2015)
4. Ruined (2016)

==== Secrets and Shadows ====
| # | Title | Date Published | Also In |
|---|---|---|---|
| 0.5 | Burn For Me | 2014 | Hot Alphas The Secrets and Shadows Story Collection |
| 0.6 | Break For Me | 2014 | The Secrets and Shadows Story Collection |
| 0.7 | Long For Me | 2014 | The Secrets and Shadows Story Collection |
| 1 | Deeper Than Need | 2014 | |
| 2 | Sweeter Than Sin | 2014 | |
| 3 | Darker Than Desire | 2015 | |

==== The McKays ====
| # | Title | Date Published | Also In |
|---|---|---|---|
| 1 | Headed for Trouble | 2015 | |
| 2 | The Trouble with Temptation | 2016 | |
| 3 | The Right Kind of Trouble | 2016 | |

==== Veil ====
1. Through the Veil (2008)
2. Veil of Shadows (2010)

==== Connected ====
| # | Title | Date Published | Also In |
|---|---|---|---|
| 1 | Good Girls Don’t | 2006 | The Hottie Next Door A Hot Man Is the Best Revenge |
| 2 | Her Wildest Dreams | 2004 | |

==== Thirty Nights with a Dirty Boy ====
| # | Title | Date Published | Also In |
|---|---|---|---|
| 1 | Book 1 | 2016 | Thirty Nights with a Dirty Boy - The Complete Serial Novel |
| 2 | Book 2 | 2016 | Thirty Nights with a Dirty Boy - The Complete Serial Novel |
| 3 | Book 3 | 2016 | Thirty Nights with a Dirty Boy - The Complete Serial Novel |

==== Fated Trilogy ====
| # | Title | Date Published | Also In |
|---|---|---|---|
| 1 | Voyeur | 2003 | Lover from Another World |
| 2 | The Dragon's Warrior | 2004 | |
| 3 | The Dragon’s Woman | 2009 | |

==== Whipped Cream and Handcuffs ====
| # | Title | Date Published | Also In |
|---|---|---|---|
| 1 | Whipped Cream and Handcuffs | 2003 | Whispered Secrets |
| 2 | Silk Scarves and Seduction | 2004 | Whispered Secrets |

==== F*ck Club ====
| # | Title | Date Published | Also In |
|---|---|---|---|
| 1 | Riley | 2017 | F*ck Club: Riley / Con / Shame |
| 2 | Con | 2017 | F*ck Club: Riley / Con / Shame |
| 3 | Shame | 2018 | F*ck Club: Riley / Con / Shame |

==== Mythe ====
1. Mythe & Magick (2004)
2. Vampire (2004)

==== Cochrans of Cocker County ====
1. Cocksure (2018)

==== Make Me Believe ====
1. Make Me Believe (2003)
2. Hearts and Wishes (2009)

==== Firewalkers ====
1. Dreamer (2004)
2. Sage (2006)

==== Night Stalkers ====
| # | Title | Date Published | Also In |
|---|---|---|---|
| 1 | Back from Hell | 2005 | |
| 2 | Nebulous | 2010 | Myth-Behavin' |

=== Works in Collaboration With ===
- The Twelve Quickies of Christmas (12 Books)
  - 3. Make Me Believe ()
    - Also in The Twelve Quickies of Christmas (1-6)
- Ex-Con
  - co-authored by M.S. Parker
- Vegas Knights (5 Books)
  - 0.5. Ruin Me (2017)
  - 1.Unbreak Me (2017)
  - 1.5 Unbind Me (2017)
  - 2. Risk Me (2017)
  - 3. Rule You (2017)
    - co-authored by Bella Love-Wins
- SEALionaire (3 Books)
- 1. SEALionaire (2016)
- 2. SEALionaire 2 (2016)
- 3. SEALionaire 3 (2016)
  - co-authored by M.S. Parker
- Colbana Files (11 Books)
  - 0.5. A Stroke of Dumb Luck (2011)
  - 7. Haunted Magic (2020)
  - co-author by J.C. Daniels

=== As J C Daniels ===
(Note: Retrieved from the printable book list at the author's pen name J C Daniels website)

- A Stroke of Dumb Luck (free story, on TOR)

==== Colbana Files ====
| # | Title | Date Published | Also In |
|---|---|---|---|
| 0.5 | A Stroke of Dumb Luck | 2011 | |
| 0.6 | Bladed Magic | 2014 | |
| 0.7 | Damon | 2017 | |
| 1 | Blade Song | 2012 | |
| 2 | Night Blade | 2012 | |
| 3 | Broken Blade | 2014 | |
| 4 | Edged Blade | 2015 | |
| 4.5 | Misery's Way: A Kit Colbana World Story | | |
| 5 | Shadowed Blade | | |
| 6 | Haunted Blade | | |
| 7 | Haunted Magic | | |

=== Anthologies and collections ===
| Anthology or Collection | Contents | Publication Date | Editor | Comments |
|---|---|---|---|---|
| Hunters: The Beginning | Declan and Tori Eli and Sarel | 2004 | | The Hunters |
| The Twelve Quickies of Christmas (1-6) | Make Me Believe | 2004 | Ashleigh Raine Lora Leigh Kate Douglas Rachel Bo R. Casteel | Book 3 of 12 |
| Ellora's Cavemen: Tales from the Temple IV | Ghost of a Chance | 2004 | Jaid Black Tawny Taylor Annie Windsor Denise A. Agnew Mlyn Hurn | |
| Hot Spell | Under Your Spell | 2004 | Jennifer Dunne Camille Anthony | |
| Hunters: Interlude | Byron and Kit Jonathan and Lori | 2005 | | The Hunters |
| A Wish, a Kiss, a Dream | Djinn's Wish | 2005 | Mary Wine Lora Leigh | |
| More Than Magick | Once Upon A Midnight Blue | 2005 | Rhyannon Byrd Titania Ladley | |
| Seasons of Magick | Under Your Spell | 2005 | Jennifer Dunne | |
| Christmas Wishes | Every Last Fantasy His Christmas Cara | 2005 | | |
| Myth-Behavin' | Nebulous | 2005 | Bonnie Hamre Rachel Bo | |
| Cops and Cowboys | Her Wildest Dreams | 2005 | Lora Leigh | |
| Ellora's Cavemen: Legendary Tails II | Freak of Nature | 2005 | Jaci Burton Jan Springer Charlene Teglia Margaret L. Carter Tielle St. Clare | |
| Legends: Hunters and Heroes | The Huntress Hunter's Pride | 2006 | | The Hunters |
| Second Chances | Redemption Talking With the Dead | 2006 | | |
| Hot Spell | | 2006 | Emma Holly Lora Leigh Meljean Brook | |
| All She Wants | His Christmas Cara | 2006 | Jaid Black Dominique Adair | |
| Heart and Soul | Heart Soul | 2007 | | The Hunters |
| Lover from Another World | Voyeur | 2007 | Rachel Carrington Elizabeth Jewell | Fated Trilogy |
| The Mammoth Book of Vampire Romance | Hunter's Choice | 2008 | Trisha Telep Karen Chance Lilith Saintcrow Colleen Gleason C.T. Adams Savannah Russe Caitlín R. Kiernan Vicki Pettersson Jenna Black Shiloh Walker Rachel Vincent Rebecca York Jenna Maclaine Raven Hart Delilah Devlin Nancy Holder Alexis Morgan Cathy Clamp Keri Arthur Susan Sizemore Amanda Ashley Dina James Barbara Emrys Sherri Browning Erwin | The Hunters |
| Private Places | Hunter’s Mercy | 2008 | Robin Schone Claudia Dain Allyson James | The Hunters |
| A Hot Man Is the Best Revenge | Good Girls Don’t | 2008 | Beverly Havlir Delilah Devlin | |
| The Hottie Next Door | Good Girls Don’t | 2009 | | Connected |
| Whispered Secrets | Whipped Cream and Handcuffs Silk Scarves and Seduction One of the Guys | 2009 | | Whipped Cream and Handcuffs |
| Doing It the Hard Way | One Night with You | 2009 | T.J. Michaels Madison Hayes | |
| Good Things Come in Threes | | 2009 | Anya Bast Jan Springer | |
| Red Hot Holidays | His Christmas Cara | 2009 | Shelby Reed Lacey Alexander | |
| The First Book of Grimm | Candy Houses No Prince Charming | 2010 | | Grimm's Circle |
| The Mammoth Book of Special Ops Romance | | 2010 | Trisha Telep Shannon K. Butcher Sydney Croft Laura Griffin Cheyenne McCray Marliss Melton Charlene Teglia Michele Albert Gina Robinson Jordan Summers Caitlyn Nicholas Liz MuirNicola March Gennita Low Debra Webb Penny McCall Rinda Elliott Charlotte Mede Rachel Caine E.C. Sheedy | |
| Wicked Reads | | 2011 | Shayla Black Sylvia Day Karin Tabke Beth Williamson Cathryn Fox Nikki Duncan Mackenzie McKade | The Hunters |
| The Mammoth Book of Hot Romance | | 2011 | Sonia Florens Susan Sizemore Victoria Janssen Anna Windsor Cathy Clamp N.J. Walters Jackie Kessler Louisa Burton Madelynne Ellis Bonnie Edwards Charlene Teglia Rosemary Laurey Portia Da Costa Sèphera Girón Delilah Devlin Michelle M. Pillow Adrianne Brennan Selah March Justine Elyot Saskia Walker Rebecca York Charlotte Stein Sasha White K.D. Grace Lilith Saintcrow | |
| Author Moments | | 2011 | Shayla Black Karin Harlow Ava Riley Corinne Davies Mahalia Levey Melissa Schroeder Virna DePaul Heather Long Elizabeth Silver Melissa Ecker Sophie Oak Karin Tabke Cathryn Fox Heather Rainier Eliza Gayle Edie Ramer Beth Williamson Kris Cook | |
| The Second Book of Grimm | Crazed Hearts Tarnished Knight | 2012 | | Grimm's Circle |
| Hot in Handcuffs | The Unwilling | 2012 | Sylvia Day Shayla Black | The FBI Psychics |
| Bound Temptations (2-in-1) | Beg Me Tempt Me | 2012 | | |
| Lost in Love | Playing for Keeps A Forever Kind of Love | 2013 | | |
| Deadly Desires | Don't Walk Away | 2013 | Sydney Croft | |
| The Third Book of Grimm | Grimm Tidings Blind Destiny | 2014 | | Grimm's Circle |
| The Hunters Series: Boxed Set Books 1-5 | Declan and Tori Eli and Sarel Byron and Kit Jonathan and Lori Ben and Shadoe | 2015 | | The Hunters |
| Hot Alphas | Burn for Me | 2015 | Lora Leigh Laurelin McGee Kate Douglas | Secrets and Shadows |
| The Forsaken | The Unwanted The Innocent | 2015 | | The FBI Psychics |
| Deceptions: A Collection | You Own Me Hunt Me Blade Song | 2015 | | |
| Branded | You Own Me The Virgin's Night Out | 2015 | | |
| The Colbana Files Boxed Set | Bladed Magic Blade Song Night Blade Broken Blade | 2015 | using alias J.C. Daniels | |
| The Secrets and Shadows Story Collection | Burn for Me Break for Me Long for Me | 2016 | | Secrets and Shadows |
| SEALionaire Complete Series Box Set | SEALionaire SEALionaire 2 SEALionaire 3 | 2016 | M.S. Parker | |
| Grimm's Circle: Books 1-3 | The Unwanted The Innocent Candy Houses Tarnished Knight | 2017 | | Grimm's Circle |
| Thirty Nights with a Dirty Boy - The Complete Serial Novel | Books 1-3 | 2017 | | Thirty Nights with a Dirty Boy |
| Proceed with Caution | A Stroke of Dumb Luck | 2017 | using alias J.C. Daniels | |
| Valentine's Billionaire Bad Boys | His Every Desire SEALionaire: Complete Series Ex-Con Lacey’s Game | 2017 | M.S. Parker | |
| F*ck Club: Riley / Con / Shame | Riley Con Shame | 2018 | | F*ck Club |
| The Cocky Cockers: A Romance Anthology | | 2018 | Jackie Barbosa Sela Carsen Tom Eden Anne Gaston Missy Jane Sadie Jay Tara Kennedy Taryn Kincaid Lucy Kinsley Susan Burdorf Leah Carr Mia Koutras Elise Logan L.J. LaBarthe, Carrie Lomax Mara Malins Heather Massey Siobhan Muir Marie Piper Joanne Renaud Dominique Rothford Selene Grace Silver Naomi Tajedler Emily Veinglory Jules Voigt Jody Wallace Mary Winter Julia Wolf Tara Song Kinsey Holley John Jacobson | |
| Vegas Knights Box Set | Ruin Me Risk Me Rule You | 2018 | Bella Love-Wins | |
