= Lilith Saintcrow =

American author

- Born: December 31, 1976 (age 49); New Mexico
- Occupation: Novelist
- Children: 2
- Writing career
- Pen name: Anna Beguine, S.C. Emmett, Lili St. Crow
- Genres: Paranormal romance, urban fantasy, young adult
- Website: lilithsaintcrow.com

Lilith Saintcrow (born December 31, 1976) is an American author of urban fantasy, historical fantasy, paranormal romance and steampunk novels. She uses the nom de plume Lili St. Crow when writing for the teenage market.

Saintcrow was praised by Publishers Weekly for her "multigenre talent". The newspaper The Columbian, describes her novels as "atmospheric and stylish".

Saintcrow was born in New Mexico. She currently resides in Vancouver, Washington.

== Bibliography ==
=== As Lilith Saintcrow ===
==== Stand-alone novels ====
- Selene (2008)
- The Demon's Librarian (2009)
- Taken (2011)
- Unfallen (2011)
- Squirrel Terror (2013)
- Pack (2014)
- Blood Call (2015)
- Rose & Thunder (2015)
- The Marked (2016)
- She Wolf and Cub (2017)
- Cormorant Run (2017)
- Desires, Known (2017)
- Fish (2017)
- Afterwar (2018) – Afterwar is described in a Los Angeles Times review as "incredibly timely, well written and important."
- Beast of Wonder (2018)
- Jozzie & Sugar Belle (2018)
- Rattlesnake Wind (2018)
- Incorruptible (2019)
- Harmony (2019)
- Moon's Knight (2021)

==== The Dead God's Heart Duology ====
- Spring's Arcana (2023)
- The Salt-Black Tree (2023)

==== Non-fiction ====
- The Quill and The Crow: Volume 1 (2013)

==== Dante Valentine ====
Dante Valentine series. One reviewer describes the series as depicting "a world controlled by magic rather than psychic powers." Set 600 years in the future, Working for the Devil, was described by one reviewer as a book that "mixes cyberpunk and schlock science, involving a missing map of the devil's DNA, with endless set-piece fights, all-round mayhem and vivid sex, and does it well enough to be forgiven."

#	Title	Date published	Also In
1	Working for the Devil	2004	Dante Valentine: The Complete Series
2	Dead Man Rising	2005	Dante Valentine: The Complete Series
3	The Devil's Right Hand	2006	Dante Valentine: The Complete Series
4	Saint City Sinners	2006	Dante Valentine: The Complete Series
5	To Hell and Back	2008	Dante Valentine: The Complete Series
5.1	Brother's Keeper	2008	Hotter Than Hell
5.5	Coming Home	2008	The Mammoth Book of Vampire Romance

==== Jill Kismet ====
#	Title	Date Published	Also In
1	Night Shift	2008	
2	Hunter's Prayer	2008	
3	Redemption Alley	2009	
4	Flesh Circus	2009	
5	Heaven's Spite	2010	
5.5	Holding the Line	2011	Those Who Fight Monsters: Tales of Occult Detectives
6	Angel Town	2011	
6.5	Kiss	2017	Urban Enemies

==== Bannon & Clare ====
#	Title	Date Published	Also In
1	The Iron Wyrm Affair	2012	Bannon & Clare: The Complete Series
1.5	The Damnation Affair	2012	Bannon & Clare: The Complete Series
2	The Red Plague Affair	2013	Bannon & Clare: The Complete Series
3	The Ripper Affair	2014	Bannon & Clare: The Complete Series

==== The Watcher ====
#	Title	Date Published	Also In
1	Dark Watcher	2004	
2	Storm Watcher	2005	
3	Fire Watcher	2006	
4	Cloud Watcher	2006	
5	Mindhealer	2008	
6	Finder	2020	

==== Romance of the Arquitaine ====
1. The Hedgewitch Queen (2011)
2. The Bandit King (2012)

==== Gallow and Ragged ====
1. Trailer Park Fae (2015)
2. Roadside Magic (2016)
3. Wasteland King (2016)

==== Steelflower Chronicles ====
1. Steelflower (2007)
2. Steelflower at Sea (2017)
3. Steelflower in Snow (2018)

==== The Society Series ====
1. The Society (2005)
2. Hunter, Healer (2005)

==== Roadtrip Z ====
#	Title	Date Published	Also In
1	Cotton Crossing	2017	The Complete Roadtrip Z
2	In the Ruins	2017	The Complete Roadtrip Z
3	Pocalypse Road	2018	The Complete Roadtrip Z
4	Atlanta Bound	2019	The Complete Roadtrip Z

==== Super Agents ====
#	Title	Date Published	Also In
1	Agent Zero	2015	Harlequin Romantic Suspense September 2015 Box Set The Secret King / Agent Zero
2	Agent Gemini	2015	Harlequin Romantic Suspense September 2015 Box Set Harlequin Romantic Suspense December 2015 Box Set

==== Hood ====
1. Season One (2019)
2. Season Two (2020)
3. Season Three (2021)

==== Ghost Squad ====
1. Damage (2021)

=== As Lili St. Crow ===
==== Tales of Beauty & Madness ====
1. Nameless (2013)
2. Wayfarer (2014)
3. Kin (2015)

==== Strange Angels ====
#	Title	Date Published	Also In
1	Strange Angels	2009	Strange Angels and Betrayals Strange Angels Novels Collection 1-3 Strange Angels Novels Collection 1-4
2	Betrayals	2009	Strange Angels and Betrayals Strange Angels Novels Collection 1-3 Strange Angels Novels Collection 1-4
3	Jealousy	2010	Strange Angels Novels Collection 1-3
4	Defiance	2011	Strange Angels Novels Collection 1-4
5	Reckoning	2011	

=== As Anna Beguine ===
==== Stand-alone novels ====
- Shane (2017)

==== Angelov Wolves ====
1. Love, Bite (2017)

==== The Keepers ====
1. Smoke (2007)
2. Mirror (2007)

=== As S.C. Emmett ===
==== Hostage of Empire ====
1. The Throne of the Five Winds (2019)
2. The Poison Prince (2020)
3. The Bloody Throne (2022)

=== Anthologies and collections ===
She has also published several short stories and the free online serial Selene (with characters from her Dante Valentine series).

Anthology or Collection	Contents	Publication Date	In Collaboration With
My Big Fat Supernatural Honeymoon	Rookwood & Mrs King	2007	P.N. Elrod Marjorie M. Liu Katie MacAlister Ronda Thompson Kelley Armstrong Jim Butcher Rachel Caine Carrie Vaughn
Hotter Than Hell	Brother's Keeper	2008	Kim Harrison Martin H. Greenberg Tanya Huff Marjorie M. Liu Cheyenne McCray L.A. Banks Susan Krinard Keri Arthur Heidi Betts Denise Little Susan Sizemore Carrie Vaughn Linda Winstead Jones
The Mammoth Book of Vampire Romance	Coming Home A Stand-up Dame	2008	Trisha Telep Karen Chance Kimberly Raye Colleen Gleason C.T. Adams and Cathy Clamp Savannah Russe Caitlín R. Kiernan Vicki Pettersson Jenna Black Shiloh Walker Rachel Vincent Rebecca York Jenna Maclaine Raven Hart Delilah Devlin Nancy Holder Alexis Morgan Cathy Clamp Keri Arthur Susan Sizemore Amanda Ashley Dina James Barbara Emrys Sherri Browning Erwin
The Eternal Kiss 13 Vampire Tales of Blood and Desire	Ambition	2008	Trisha Telep Rachel Caine Cecil Castellucci Cassandra Clare Melissa de la Cruz Karen Mahoney Maria V. Snyder Holly Black
By Blood We Live		2008	John Joseph Adams Sergei Lukyanenko Harry Turtledove Anne Rice Joe Hill Tanith Lee Stephen King Kelley Armstrong
Nothing But Red: The Anthology Inspired by the Death of Du'a Khalil		2008	Skyla Dawn Cameron Joss Whedon Leigh Dragoon Kevin Craig Laure Lackey Alex Remy Sasha Elliott Bobbi Lurie Ellen McCord Kerry Budd Gila Tal Green Melinda Blount Ann Aguirre Anne Barringer Guy Lancaster Catherine Egan Dale Jacobson Angela Todd Barbara E. Hunt Lee Kendall Reina Hardy Virginia Lore Gill O'Halloran Stacy Hill M. Jules Virginia McRae Andrena Zawinski Tom Hulley Clare Roach M.G. David Baker Maggie Dougherty Abha Iyengar C.L. Bledsoe Jasmine Santos Elizabeth Bales Frank W.J. Ray Nora Landry Lise Whidden Valentina Gnup Dana Evans Kimberly Bea Elain Corvidae Julie Klumb Ellen R. Sheeley Janna Hastings Jessica Tudor Judy Bragshaw J.E. Remy Ruth E. Walker
A Girl's Guide to Guns and Monsters		2009	Martin H. Greenberg Kerrie L. Hughes Jane Lindskold Nancy Holder Jeanne C. Stein Tanya Huff Anton Strout Kristine Kathryn Rusch Jim C. Hines Elizabeth A. Vaughn P.R. Frost Mickey Zucker Reichert Alexander B. Potter Nina Kiriki Hoffman
Dark and Stormy Knights	Rockwood & Mrs. King	2010	P.N. Elrod Ilona Andrews Jim Butcher Shannon K. Butcher Rachel Caine Deidre Knight Vicki Pettersson Carrie Vaughn
Death's Excellent Vacation	The Heart Is Always Right	2010	Charlaine Harris Toni L.P. Kelner Katie MacAlister Jeaniene Frost Jeff Abbott L.A. Banks Christopher Golden
Ardeur: 14 Writers on the Anita Blake, Vampire Hunter Series		2010	Laurell K. Hamilton Leah Wilson Nick Mamatas Heather Swain L. Jagi Lamplighter Marella Sands Cathy Clamp Alasdair Stuart Natasha Fondren Devon Ellington Melissa L. Tatum Mikhail Lyubansky Sharon Ashwood Vera Nazarian Jacob Clifton
Vampires in Love		2010	Rosalind M. Greenberg C.T. Adams Charles L. Grant Nancy Holder Larissa Ione Tanya Huff Garry Killworth Norman Partridge Anne Rice Kristine Kathryn Rusch Bradley H. Sinor Kelley Armstrong Susan Sizemore Dean Wesley Smith Elaine Viets L.A. Banks Rachel Caine Cathy Clamp Russell Davis Charles de Lint Neil Gaiman Ed Gorman
Dante Valentine: The Complete Series	Working for the Devil Dead Man Rising The Devil's Right Hand Saint City Sinners To Hell and Back	2011	
Those Who Fight Monsters: Tales of Occult Detectives	Holding the Line	2011	Justin Gustainis C.T. Adams Jackie Kessler Caitlin Kittredge Tim Pratt Carrie Vaughn Cathy Clamp Rachel Caine Laura Anne Gilman Chris Marie Green Simon R. Green C.J. Henderson Tanya Huff Julie Kenner
Chicks Kick Butt	Monsters	2011	Rachel Caine Kerrie L. Hughes Karen Chance Rachel Vincent P.N. Elrod Jenna Black Cheyenne McCray Elizabeth Vaughan Jeanne C. Stein Carole Nelson Douglas L.A. Banks Susan Krinard Nancy Holder
Strange Angels and Betrayals	Strange Angels Betrayals	2011	As Lili St. Crow
Strange Angels Novels Collection 1-3	Strange Angels Betrayals Jealousy	2011	As Lili St. Crow
Strange Angels Novels Collection 1-4	Strange Angels Betrayals Jealousy Defiance	2011	As Lili St. Crow
The Mammoth Book of Hot Romance		2011	Sonia Florens Susan Sizemore Victoria Janssen Anna Windsor Cathy Clamp N.J. Walters Jackie Kessler Louisa Burton Madelynne Ellis Bonnie Edwards Charlene Teglia Rosemary Laurey Shiloh Walker Portia Da Costa Sèphera Girón Delilah Devlin Michelle M. Pillow Adrianne Brennan Selah March Justine Elyot Saskia Walker Rebecca York Charlotte Stein Sasha White K.D. Grace
Courts of the Fey		2011	Martin H. Greenberg Russell Davis J.A. Pitts Amber Benson Michelle Sagara West Sarah A. Hoyt Mary Robinette Kowal Paul Crilley Rob Thurman Jenifer Ruth Kerrie L. Hughes Dean Wesley Smith Jane Lindskold
Heroes, Zombies, and Sausages (A Sampler): Orbit January–March 2011		2011	Joe Abercrombie K.J. Parker Kate Griffin Tom Holt Jon Courtenay Grimwood Gail Z. Martin Trent Jamieson Sabina Kane Jaye Wells Jesse Petersen
Vampires, Thieves, and Griffins		2011	Joe Abercrombie Philip Palmer Kristen Painter Greg Bear Rachel Neumeier Michael J. Sullivan
The Mammoth Book of Ghost Stories by Women		2012	Marie O'Regan Nina Allan Kelley Armstrong Marion Arnott Lady Cynthia Asquith Alex Bell Mary Elizabeth Braddon Mary Cholmondeley Amelia B. Edwards Elizabeth Gaskell Muriel Gray Nancy Holder Caitlín R. Kiernan Nancy Kilpatrick Kim Lakin-Smith Sarah Langan Alison Littlewood Gail Z. Martin Elizabeth Massie Yvonne Navarro Sarah Pinborough Gaie Sebold Lise Tuttle Edith Wharton Mary E. Wilkins Freeman
Jill Kismet: The Complete Series	Night Shift Hunter's Prayer Redemption Alley Flesh Circus Heaven's Spite Angel Town	2013	
Harlequin Romantic Suspense September 2015 Box Set	Agent Zero Agent Gemini	2015	Elle James Jennifer Morey C.J. Miller
The Secret King / Agent Zero	Agent Zero	2015	C.J. Miller
Harlequin Romantic Suspense December 2015 Box Set	Agent Gemini	2015	Rachel Lee Lisa Childs Anna Perrin
Urban Enemies	Kiss	2017	Joseph Nassise Jim Butcher Kevin Hearne Seanan McGuire Kelley Armstrong Jonathan Maberry Jeff Somers Steven Savile Caitlin Kittredge Sam Witt Craig Schaefer Jon F. Merz Faith Hunter Diana Pharaoh Francis Carrie Vaughn Domino Finn
Bannon & Clare: The Complete Series	The Iron Wyrm Affair The Damnation Affair The Red Plague Affair The Ripper Affair	2018	
The Complete Roadtrip Z	Cotton Crossing In the Ruins Pocalypse Road Atlanta Bound	2019	
Wonderland: An Anthology		2019	Marie O'Regan Paul Kane Angela Slatter James Lovegrove Alison Littlewood Cavan Scott Laura Mauro Genevieve Cogman Jonathan Green Jane Yolen L.L. McKinney George Mann M.R. Carey Rio Youers Catriona Ward Robert Shearman Juliet Marillier Cat Rambo Mark Chadbourn
Cursed: An Anthology of Dark Fairy Tales		2020	Marie O'Regan Paul Kane Angela Slatter Neil Gaiman Alison Littlewood James Brogden Tim Lebbon Charlie Jane Anders
