= Cat Adams =

Pen name of C.T. Adams and Cathy Clamp

"Cat Adams" is the joint pen name of American authors C.T. Adams and Cathy Clamp, a concept that came to fruition in 1997, when they began writing as a team. As "Cat Adams" they are the authors of the contemporary fantasy series, Blood Singer. They have also published fantasy and paranormal romance books under their own names. The "Cat Adams" book, Touch of Madness, was given the 2007 Contemporary Paranormal Romance Award by the magazine, Romantic Times.

Clamp lives in the Texas Hill Country and Adams lives in metropolitan Denver.

== Bibliography ==
=== As Cat Adams ===
==== Stand Alone Novels ====
- Abiding Lilac (2011)
- Magic's Design, Tor Paranormal Romance, 2009

==== The Blood Singer ====
#	Title	Date Published	Also In	Publisher
1	Blood Song	2010	The Blood Singer Novels 1-6 The Blood Singer Novels 1-7	Tor Books
2	Siren Song	2010	The Blood Singer Novels 1-6 The Blood Singer Novels 1-7	Tor Books
3	Demon Song	2011	The Blood Singer Novels 1-6 The Blood Singer Novels 1-7	Tor Books
4	The Isis Collar	2012	The Blood Singer Novels 1-6 The Blood Singer Novels 1-7	Tor Books
5	The Eldritch Conspiracy	2013	The Blood Singer Novels 1-6 The Blood Singer Novels 1-7	Tor Books
6	To Dance with the Devil	2013	The Blood Singer Novels 1-6 The Blood Singer Novels 1-7	Tor Books
7	All Your Wishes	2016	The Blood Singer Novels 1-7	Tor Books

=== As C.T. Adams and Cathy Clamp ===
==== Stand Alone Novels ====
- Roads to Riches: The Great Railroad Race to Aspen, Western Reflections, (2003)
- Ease the Rage (2008) – Also in The Mammoth Book of Vampire Romance
- Daniel (2009) – Also in Mammoth Book of Paranormal Romance

==== Tales of the Sazi ====
#	Title	Date Published	Also In	Publisher
1	Hunter's Moon	2004		Tor Books
2	Moon's Web	2005		Tor Books
3	Captive Moon	2006		Tor Books
4	Howling Moon	2007		Tor Books
5	Moon's Fury	2007		Tor Books
6	Timeless Moon	2008		Tor Books
7	Cold Moon Rising	2009		Tor Books
8	Serpent Moon	2010		Tor Books
8.5	An Ace in the Hole	2011	Those Who Fight Monsters: Tales of Occult Detectives	Tor Books

==== Thrall ====
1. Touch of Evil, Tor Paranormal Romance, 2006
2. Touch of Madness, Tor Paranormal Romance, 2007
3. Touch of Darkness, Tor Paranormal Romance, 2008

=== As C.T. Adams ===
==== Stand Alone Novels ====
- Olga (2011)

==== Non-fiction ====
- Ad Astra: The 50th Anniversary SFWA Cookbook (2015) – Cat Rambo et al.

==== The Fae ====
1. The Exile (2015) – Tor-Forge
2. The Rescue (2020)

==== In Collaboration With A.S. James ====
- Black & Blue (2017)
- Family Trouble (2017)
- A Nasty Little Murder (2017)
- Brutal Cold (2020)

=== As Cathy Clamp ===
==== Stand Alone Novels ====
- Fare Thee Well (2010)
- Error 404: Page Found (2010)

==== Luna Lake ====
1. Forbidden: A Novel of the Sazi (2015)
2. Illicit: A Novel of the Sazi (2016)
3. Denied (2018)

=== Anthologies and collections ===
Anthology or Collection	Contents	Publication Date	In Collaboration With
Weirdly: A Collection of Strange Stories		2007	Stacia Helpman James Cheetham M.E. Ellis Rosa Orrore Bernita Harris Rae Lindley Faith Bicknell Amanda Tieman Lion Irons Marva Dasef Faith Bicknell-Brown
Dreams & Desires 2: A Collection of Romance Tales		2008	Jenna Bayley-Burke Amanda Brice Shannon Canard Sela Carsen Rachelle Chase M.E. Ellis
The Mammoth Book of Vampire Romance	Ease the Rage	2008	Trisha Telep Karen Chance Kimberly Raye Colleen Gleason C.T. Adams and Cathy Clamp Savannah Russe Caitlín R. Kiernan Vicki Pettersson Jenna Black Shiloh Walker Rachel Vincent Rebecca York Jenna Maclaine Raven Hart Delilah Devlin Nancy Holder Alexis Morgan Cathy Clamp Keri Arthur Susan Sizemore Amanda Ashley Dina James Barbara Emrys Sherri Browning Erwin Lilith Saintcrow
Weirdly Vol 2: Eldritch		2008	Jaye Wells
The Thrall Series 1-3	Touch of Evil Touch of Madness Touch of Darkness	2009?	Anna Genoese (Editor)
The Mammoth Book of Paranormal Romance	Daniel	2009	Trisha Telep Ilona Andrews Kelley Armstrong Anya Bast Meljean Brook Rachel Caine Alyssa Day Lori Devoti Jeaniene Frost Lynda Hilburn Allyson James Jean Johnson Sherrilyn Kenyon Holly Lisle Cheyenne McCray Sara Mackenzie Catherine Mulvany Mary Jo Putney Michelle Rowen Eve Silver Maria V. Snyder Carrie Vaughn Anna Windsor
Vampires in Love		2010	Rosalind M. Greenberg Charles L. Grant Nancy Holder Larissa Ione Tanya Huff Garry Killworth Norman Partridge Anne Rice Kristine Kathryn Rusch Bradley H. Sinor Kelley Armstrong Susan Sizemore Dean Wesley Smith Elaine Viets L.A. Banks Rachel Caine Russell Davis Charles de Lint Neil Gaiman Ed Gorman Lilith Saintcrow
The Mammoth Book of Irish Romance	The Trials of Bryan Murphy	2010	Trisha Telep Shirley Kennedy Claire Delacroix Margot Maguire Cindy Miles Patricia Rice Jennifer Ashley Kathleen Givens Jenna Maclaine Cindy Holby Helen Scott Taylor Roberta Gillis Ciar Cullen Susan Krinard Nadia Williams Penelope Neri Sandra Newgent Sue-Ellen Welfonder Pat McDermott Dara England
Chicks in Capes		2010	Lori Gentile Karen O'Brien Maggie Thompson Trina Robbins Nancy Holder Gillian Horvath Barbara Randall Kesel Elaine Lee Kathe Catto Valerie D'Orozio K.G. McAbee Jennifer Fallon Debbie Viguié Elizabeth Massie
Tales Of The Sazi 1-8	Hunter's Moon Moon's Web Captive Moon Howling Moon Moon's Fury Timeless Moon Cold Moon Rising Serpent Moon	2010?	
Those Who Fight Monsters: Tales of Occult Detectives	An Ace in the Hole	2011	Justin Gustainis Jackie Kessler Caitlin Kittredge Tim Pratt Carrie Vaughn Rachel Caine Laura Anne Gilman Chris Marie Green Simon R. Green C.J. Henderson Tanya Huff Julie Kenner Lilith Saintcrow
The Mammoth Book of Hot Romance		2011	Sonia Florens Susan Sizemore Victoria Janssen Anna Windsor N.J. Walters Jackie Kessler Louisa Burton Madelynne Ellis Bonnie Edwards Charlene Teglia Rosemary Laurey Shiloh Walker Portia Da Costa Sèphera Girón Delilah Devlin Michelle M. Pillow Adrianne Brennan Selah March Justine Elyot Saskia Walker Rebecca York Charlotte Stein Sasha White K.D. Grace Lilith Saintcrow
The Mammoth Book of Ghost Romance	Yours in Eternity	2012	Trisha Telep Gwyn Cready Julia London Liz Maverick Annette Blair Caridad Piñeiro Jeannie Holmes Cindy Miles Dru Pagliassotti Christie Ridgway Sara Reinke Sharon Shinn Linda Wisdom Holly Lisle Anna Campbell Carolyn Crane Jennifer Estep Donna Fletcher
The Stories: Five Years of Original Fiction on Tor.com	Fare Thee Well	2013	Gregory Benford Beth Bernobich Jedediah Berry Michael Bishop Terry Bisson Alex Bledsoe Jennifer Bosworth Damien Broderick Jessica Brody Steven Brust Daniel Abraham Cecil Castellucci Adam-Troy Castro John Chu Jacob Clifton Deborah Coates Paul Cornell Matthew Costello Kathryn Cramer Sean Craven S.J. Day A.M. Dellamonica Cory Doctorow Andy Duncan G.D. Falksen Elizabeth Fama Michael Flynn James Alan Gardner Felix Gilman Steven Gould Ann Aguirre Eileen Gunn Cat Hellisen Thomas Olde Heuvelt Gennifer Albin Charlie Jane Anders Anna Banks Leigh Bardugo Elizabeth Bear Nina Kiriki Hoffman Peter Orullian Garth Nix Catherynne M. Valente Cherie Priest
The Mammoth Book of Futuristic Romance		2013	Trisha Telep Linnea Sinclair C.L. Wilson Jess Granger Bianca D'Arc Marcella Burnard Susan Sizemore Charlene Teglia Jeannie Holmes Jamie Leigh Hansen Patrice Sarath Michele Lang Mandy M. Roth Delilah Devlin Kiersten Fay Regan Black Donna Kauffman Leanna Renee Hieber
Hunks, Hammers, and Happily Ever Afters	Hot Summer Nights	2015	Cari Quinn Jodi Redford Anna J. Stewart Amie Stuart Leah Braemel Chudney Thomas
The Blood Singer Novels 1-6	Blood Song Siren Song Demon Song The Isis Collar The Eldritch Conspiracy To Dance with the Devil	2015	
Kolchak The Night Stalker: Passages Of The Macabre		2016	Dave Ulanski C.J. Henderson Ed Gorman Nancy Kilpatrick Nancy Holder M.M. Romatka Matthew Baugh Mark Graham James Chambers Ricky Sprague Rick Lai Cathy Clamp Tracey J. Hll Bryon Winton Joe Gentile
The Blood Singer Novels 1-7	Blood Song Siren Song Demon Song The Isis Collar The Eldritch Conspiracy To Dance with the Devil All Your Wishes	2017?	
