= Lori Handeland =

American author of romance novels (born 1961)

- Born: 1961 (age 64–65)
- Occupation: Author
- Writing career
- Genre: Romance
- Notable works: Blue Moon, The Mommy Quest
- Notable awards: RITA award – Paranormal Romance; 2005 Blue Moon; RITA award – Long Contemporary Romance; 2007 The Mommy Quest
- Website: www.lorihandeland.com

Lori Handeland (born 1961) is an American author of romance novels. She has twice won the Romance Writers of America RITA Award.

== Biography ==
Handeland has wanted to be a writer since she was 10 years old. As an adult, she wrote her first book in a two-year span. It was chosen for publication.

Handeland has written over 30 novels. For St. Martin's Press, Handeland writes single-title paranormal suspense romance novels, some of which are written in first person narrative. She has also had several contemporary romance novels published in the Harlequin Superromance category line.

Handeland is married and has two sons.

== Bibliography ==
=== Stand-Alone Novels ===
- Second Chance (1994)
- Charlie and the Angel (1995)
- Shadow Lover (1995)
- D.J.'s Angel (1995)
- Full Moon Dreams (1996)
- By Any Other Name (1998)
- Dreams of an Eagle (1998)
- When You Wish (2000)
- An Outlaw for Christmas (2001)
- Red Moon Rising (2015), a novella previously published in the anthology Stroke of Midnight

=== Series ===
==== Precious Gems Historical Romance line ====
Lori Handeland is but one of multiple authors that wrote mostly non-related romance stories for this now defunct line of books

- 35 Just After Midnight (1999)
- 67 Loving a Legend (2000)

==== Harlequin Superromance line ====
Lori Handeland is but one of many authors that write or have written mostly non-related romance stories for this line of books

- 922 Mother of the Year (2000)
- 969 Doctor, Doctor (2001)
- 1004 Leave It to Max (2001)
- 1063 A Sheriff in Tennessee (2002)
- 1099 The Farmer's Wife (2002)

===== Luchetti Brothers series =====
Part of the Harlequin Superromance line, but with connected characters

- 1151 The Daddy Quest (2003)
- 1193 The Brother Quest (2004)
- 1226 The Husband Quest (2004)
- 1293 A Soldier's Quest (2005)
- 1334 The Mommy Quest (2006)

==== Rock Creek Six series ====
Books 2, 4, and 6 of this series were written by Linda Devlin

- 1 Reese (2001)
- 3 Rico (2001)
- 5 Nate (2002)

==== Night Creature series ====
- 1 Blue Moon (2004)
- 2 Hunter's Moon (2005)
- 3 Dark Moon (2005)
- 4 Crescent Moon (2006)
- 5 Midnight Moon (2006)
- 6 Rising Moon (2007)
- 7 Hidden Moon (2007)
- 8 Thunder Moon (2008)
- 9 Marked by the Moon (2010)
- 10 Moon Cursed (2011)
- 11 Crave the Moon (2011)

==== The Phoenix Chronicles ====
- 1 Any Given Doomsday (2008)
- 2 Doomsday Can Wait (2009)
- 3 Apocalypse Happens (2009)
- 4 Chaos Bites (2010)

==== Shakespeare Undead ====
1. Shakespeare Undead (2010)
2. Zombie Island (2012)

==== Sisters of the Craft ====
1. In The Air Tonight (June 2015)
2. Heat of the Moment (June 2015)
3. Smoke on the Water (August 2015)

=== Collections ===
- Trick or Treat (1997) (with Lark Eden, Stobie Piel and Lynda Trent)
- The Farmer's Wife / Dreamless (2002)
- Then He Kissed Her (2003) (with Kate Donovan and Julie Moffett)
- Stroke of Midnight (2004) (with Amanda Ashley, L A Banks and Sherrilyn Kenyon)
- Wrong Man / Daddy Quest (2004) (with Laura Abbot)
- Family of Her Own / Brother Quest (2004) (with Brenda Novak)
- Husband Quest / Operation - Texas (2004) (with Roxanne Rustand)
- Dates from Hell (2006) (with Kelley Armstrong, Kim Harrison and Lynsay Sands)
- My Big Fat Supernatural Wedding (2006) (with L A Banks, Jim Butcher, Rachel Caine, P N Elrod, Esther Friesner, Charlaine Harris, Sherrilyn Kenyon and Susan Krinard)
- Moon Fever (2007) (with Caridad Piñeiro, Maggie Shayne and Susan Sizemore)
- No Rest for the Witches (2007) (with MaryJanice Davidson, Cheyenne McCray and Christine Warren)
- Hex Sympols (TBA)

== Awards and reception ==
- 2005 - Romance Writers of America RITA Award, Paranormal Romance – Blue Moon
- 2007 - Romance Writers of America RITA Award, Long Contemporary Romance – The Mommy Quest

Handeland has also been nominated seven times for Romantic Times Reviewers' Choice Awards, winning in 2005 for A Soldier's Quest.
