= Christine Warren =

American novelist

- Occupation: Author
- Writing career
- Period: 2003–2019
- Genre: Paranormal Romance

Christine Warren is a USA Today and The New York Times recognized American author of romance novels. She is the author of the series The Others. Her books are published by St. Martin’s Press. She has not released a novel since 2019.

== Biography ==
Christine Warren was born and raised in coastal New England. She currently lives in the Pacific Northwest where she enjoys horseback riding, playing with her pets, identifying dogs from photos of their underbellies, and reading things someone else had written, when she herself is not working on a novel.

== Bibliography ==
=== The Others ===
==== Novel ====
1. Wolf At The Door (2006) (ISBN 0312939620)
2. She's No Faerie Princess (2006) (ISBN 0312347766)
3. The Demon You Know (2007) (ISBN 0312347774)
4. Howl at the Moon (2007) (ISBN 0312947909)
5. Walk on the Wild Side (2008) (ISBN 0312947917)
6. One Bite With A Stranger (2008) (ISBN 0312947933)
7. Big Bad Wolf (2009) (ISBN 031294795X)
8. You're So Vein (2009) (ISBN 0312947925)
9. Born To Be Wild (2010) (ISBN 0312357192)
10. Prince Charming Doesn't Live Here (2010)
11. Black Magic Woman (2011)
12. Not Your Ordinary Faerie Tale (2011)
13. On the Prowl (2012)
14. Drive Me Wild (2012)
15. Hungry Like A Wolf (2013)

==== Short stories ====
- Fantasy Fix (2003) (expanded and retitled One Bite With A Stranger)
- Fur Factor (2003) (expanded and retitled Big Bad Wolf)
- Faer Fetched (2003) (expanded and retitled Prince Charming Doesn't Live Here)
- Fighting Faer (2003) (expanded and retitled Not Your Ordinary Faerie Tale)
- Fur For All (2003) (expanded and retitled Drive Me Wild)
- Fur Play (2004) (expanded and retitled Hungry Like A Wolf)

=== Gargoyles Series ===
1. Heart of Stone (2013)
2. Stone Cold Lover (2014)
3. Hard as a Rock (2015)
4. Rocked by Love (2016)
5. Hard to Handle (2017)
6. Hard Breaker (2017)

=== Online Short Stories ===
- The Bargaining (2005) at Amazon
- Heart of the Sea (2009) at Macmillan Part of the Others series

=== Anthologies ===
- Any Witch Way She Can in No Rest for the Witches (2007) with MaryJanice Davidson, Lori Handeland, and Cheyenne McCray. Part of the Others series
- Devil’s Bargain in Huntress (2009) with Marjorie M. Liu, Caitlin Kittredge, and Jenna Maclaine.
