= The Wrong Man (disambiguation) =

The Wrong Man is a 1956 film directed by Alfred Hitchcock.

The Wrong Man may also refer to:

- The Wrong Man, a musical (2014), album (2019), and film (2019) by Ross Golan

== Film ==
- The Wrong Man (1917 film), a 1917 film starring Harry Carey
- The Wrong Man (1993 film), a 1993 film starring Rosanna Arquette
- Lucky Number Slevin, a 2006 film, released in Australia as The Wrong Man

== Literature ==
- The Wrong Man (1896), a novel by Dorothea Gerard
- The Wrong Man (1946), a novel by H. C. Bailey
- The Wrong Man (1984), a novel by Ann Major
- The Wrong Man (2004), a novel by Laura Abbot
- The Wrong Man (2007), a novel by John Katzenbach
- The Wrong Man (2015), a novel by Kate White

== Music ==
- "Wrong Man", a song by Paul Gilbert from his 1998 album Flying Dog
- "Wrong Man", a song by Deep Purple from their 2005 album Rapture of the Deep

== Television ==
=== Episodes ===
- "Wrong Man", Gunsmoke season 2, episode 29 (1957)
- "Wrong Man", Outlier episode 2 (2020)
- "The Wrong Man", A Crime to Remember season 3, episode 6 (2015)
- "The Wrong Man", Altered Carbon season 1, episode 5 (2018)
- "The Wrong Man", Becker season 3, episode 6 (2000)
- "The Wrong Man", Death in Paradise series 2, episode 2 (2014)
- "The Wrong Man", Early Edition season 1, episode 10 (1996)
- "The Wrong Man", Furuhata Ninzaburō season 2, episode 9 (1996)
- "The Wrong Man", Gunsmoke season 12, episode 7 (1966)
- "The Wrong Man", Hancock's Half Hour series 4, episode 10 (1959)
- "The Wrong Man", Judging Amy season 5, episode 5 (2003)
- "The Wrong Man", Paul Merton in Galton and Simpson's... series 2, episode 2 (1997)
- "The Wrong Man", Pony Express episode 13 (1959)
- "The Wrong Man", Shades of LA episode 2 (1990)
- "The Wrong Man", The Adventures of Kit Carson season 4, episode 4 (1954)
- "The Wrong Man", The Bill series 22, episode 74 (2006)
- "The Wrong Man", The First 48 season 4, episode 10a (2006)
- "The Wrong Man", The Manhunter episode 19 (1975)
- "The Wrong Man", The Rifleman season 1, episode 27 (1959)

=== Shows ===
- Wrong Man, a 2018 six-part docuseries by Joe Berlinger

== See also ==
- The Wrong Mans, a 2013 comedy thriller series starring James Corden and Mathew Baynton
- The Wrong Guy, a 1997 comedy film starring David Foley
