= Catherine Adams =

Catherine Adams (or similar) may refer to:

== Actors ==
- Kathryn Adams (actress, born 1893) (1893–1959), American silent-film actress
- Kathryn Adams (actress, born 1920) (1920–2016), American actress; later name Kathryn Adams Doty
- Katie Adams, American voice actress for 1990s and 2000s (Weiß Kreuz#Civilians)

== Political figures ==
- Irene Adams (Katherine Patricia Irene Adams, born 1947), Scottish peer and MP
- Cathie Adams (born 1950), American conservative political activist from Texas

== Sportspeople ==
- Kathryn Adams, American figure skater; gold medalist at 1984 St. Ivel International#Ladies
- Kate Adams, Scottish international indoor and lawn bowler
- Katrina Adams (born 1968), American tennis player

== Others ==
- Katherine Langhorne Adams (1885–1977), American painter and printmaker
- Katherine L. Adams (born 1964), American attorney at Apple Inc
- Cathy Adams, British legal counselor (List of witnesses of the Iraq Inquiry#June 2010)
- Cat Adams, pen name, since 1997, of American fantasy authors C.T. Adams and Cathy Clamp
- Katharine Adams (1862–1952), English bookbinder
- Kate Lee Harris Adams (1919–2002), American pilot with the Women Airforce Service Pilots

== Characters ==
- Kay Adams Corleone, née Katherine Adams, portrayed by Diane Keaton in 1972 film The Godfather

== See also ==
- Adams (surname)
- Kathleen Adams (disambiguation)
