= Cassandra Palmer series =

Novel series

The Cassandra Palmer series
- Touch the Dark - Cassandra Palmer #1; Claimed by Shadow - Cassandra Palmer#2; Embrace the Night - Cassandra Palmer#3; Curse the Dawn - Cassandra Palmer#4; Hunt the Moon - Cassandra Palmer#5; Tempt the Stars - Cassandra Palmer#6; Reap the Wind - Cassandra Palmer#7
- Author: Karen Chance
- Country: United States
- Language: English
- Genre: Fantasy, urban fantasy (Vampires, Supernatural)
- Publisher: Penguin Books
- Published: June 2006 - Present
- Media type: Print (paperback)

The Cassandra Palmer series is a set of fantasy novels written by Karen Chance. The series tells the story of a young woman named Cassie Palmer, a powerful clairvoyant who has the ability to communicate with the spirit realm.

The series has appeared on the New York Times and USA Today bestseller lists, with Embrace the Night reaching #6 on the New York Times Bestseller list.

== Characters ==
=== Cassandra Palmer ===
Cassandra "Cassie" Palmer is the protagonist of the series. A powerful seer, she was brought up by a vampire who wanted to monopolize her gift. She escaped him, but soon her past caught up with her, although not in the way she'd feared. The Pythia, the supernatural community's chief seer, was dying and she tapped Cassie to replace her.

Cassie must navigate new abilities and enemies, while trying to survive a war. Cassie is trying to stay alive long enough to figure out how to use the power of her office, and to determine what to do with it when she does.

=== Mircea Basarab ===
Mircea Basarab is a secondary character. He appears in a spin off, Masks, detailing his history as a five-hundred-year-old master vampire and a member of the Vampire Senate.

=== John Pritkin ===
John Pritkin is a war mage and a member of the supernatural community's police force. War mages specialize in demon killing. Sent on a new mission, he is tasked with killing the upstart pretender to the Pythia's throne, Cassie Palmer. Later in the series, Pritkin retires from the war mages and becomes the Pythia's new bodyguard.

=== Francoise ===
Francoise, a poor village girl from seventeenth-century France, was transported to the 21st century following a series of unexpected events. She possesses outdated magic, but no longer faces threat from the Inquisition. Her current boyfriend appears ideal, despite being possessed by an ancient demon. Drawing on her past experiences, Francoise focuses on adapting to her new circumstances and securing whatever resources she can.

=== Tomas ===
Tomas was born the bastard son of a Spanish conquistador who left before giving Tomas a surname. Tomas could have taken on his master's name, once a Spanish nobleman took a liking to him. But after being forcibly changed into a vampire and treated as a slave for four hundred years, Tomas resented this name. Now, all he wants is his hated master dead.

=== Kit Marlowe ===
Kit Marlowe is a crossover character, appearing in both the Cassandra Palmer and Dorina Basarab series. A spy since Elizabethan times, he currently employs his abilities on behalf of the vampire senate. Of course, Marlowe isn't just any old spy; these days, he runs the senate's spy network and he does it very well. He's best known for his charisma, knowledge, and ruthlessness.

=== Billy-Joe ===
A 17-year-old Cassie bought an "ugly old necklace" from a pawn shop and discovered that it was haunted by a ghost named Billy Joe. Billy had cheated playing cards and was subsequently shoved into a sack and tossed into the Mississippi River at the age of 29. Cassie and Billy are friends and Billy often works as a spy because practically none of the supernatural community can see him. His work keeps Cassie safe throughout the novels.

=== Louis-César ===
Louis-César is a master-level vampire and dueling champion of the European Senate.

== Novels ==
- Touch the Dark, June 2006, ISBN 978-0-451-46093-6
- Claimed by Shadow, April 2007, ISBN 978-0-451-46152-0
- Embrace the Night, April 2008, ISBN 978-0-451-46199-5
- Curse the Dawn, April 2009, ISBN 978-0-451-41270-6
- Hunt the Moon, June 2011, ISBN 978-0-451-41307-9
- Tempt the Stars, October 2013, ISBN 978-0-451-41905-7
- Masks, March 2014, ASIN B00J0H0NQK
- Reap the Wind, November 2015, ISBN 978-0-451-41907-1
- Ride the Storm, August 2017, ISBN 978-1-101-98998-2
- Brave the Tempest, 2019
- Shatter the earth, February 2020
- Ignite The Fire: Incendiary, September 2021
- Ignite The Fire: Inferno, January 2022
- Hijack The Seas: Seismic, August 2024
- Hijack The Seas: Tsunami (not yet released)

== Short stories ==
- The Day of the Dead - currently available on Karen Chances website and also in anthology The Mammoth Book of Vampire Romance.
- The Gauntlet - a Kit Marlowe short, currently available on Karen Chance's website.
- The Queens Witch - a Kit Marlowe short, currently available on Karen Chance's website.
- A Family Affair - a John Pritkin novella, currently available on Karen Chance's website.
- Shadowland - a John Pritkin short, currently available on Karen Chance's website.

== Critical reception ==
In 2011, the fifth entry in the series Hunt the Moon received 4.5 stars out of 5 from Romantic Times Book Reviews.

"... There is never a dull moment in a Chance novel, as the action speeds from high-stakes action to death-defying exploits guaranteed to keep readers breathless. The evolution reluctant heroine Cassie undertakes as she begins to embrace her powers has been a roller-coaster ride."
