= Tilly Greene =

American romantic fiction author

- Born: Southern California, U.S.
- Occupation: Novelist
- Writing career
- Genre: Romance
- Website: www.tillygreene.com

Tilly Greene is an American romantic fiction author.

== Biography ==
Born in Southern California, Greene eventually moved to North Yorkshire in England to further her education, and now resides in the New Jersey.

== Bibliography ==
=== Paperback ===
- Extreme Speed, Total Control, Whiskey Creek Press Torrid - 2006
- Zandia, Samhain Publishing - 2007
- Highland Heat, Ellora's Cave - 2009

=== eBook ===
- Come, Sweet Creature, Whiskey Creek Press Torrid - 2006
- Extreme Speed, Total Control, Whiskey Creek Press Torrid - 2006
- New Beginnings: Carpe Diem, Samhain Publishing - 2006
- An Invitation to the World: Russia and New Zealand, Whiskey Creek Press Torrid - 2006
- An Invitation to the World 2: China and India, Whiskey Creek Press Torrid - 2007
- Zandia, Samhain Publishing - 2007
- Ride 'em, Ellora's Cave - 2008
- Highland Heat, Ellora's Cave - 2009
- An Invitation to the World: Russia, New Zealand, China and India, Best of Torrid Teasers Vol 2, Whiskey Creek Press Torrid - 2010
- Call Me Lucifer, Whiskey Creek Press Torrid – 2010
- My Angel, Whiskey Creek Press Torrid – 2010
- Missing in Paradise, Ellora's Cave - 2011
- Konnichiwa Cowboy, Tilly Greene - 2011
- Good, Bad and Kinky, Whiskey Creek Press Torrid – 2011
- The Keeper, Tilly Greene - 2012
- Special Delivery, Tilly Greene - 2012
- Leather Bride, Ellora's Cave - 2012
- Taste for Blood, Tilly Greene - 2012
- Pleasured in New York City, Tilly Greene - 2012
- Hephaestus Lays Down the Law, Tilly Greene - 2013
- Together Again, Tilly Greene - 2013

=== For the benefit of others ===
- Poor Man Taco Recipe, The Write Ingredients, Samhain Publishing – 2007 – raises funds for the continued support of America's Troops.
- Drive-In, Coming Together: Under Fire, Coming Together - 2007 - all proceeds to benefit 2007 San Diego wildfire victims
- And She Scores!, All Romance - 2010 - all proceeds to the American Heart Association
- Coming Together: Against H8, keepsake book, Coming Together - 2010 - all proceeds to the NOH8 Campaign

== Professional associations ==
- Romance Writers of America
- Erotic Authors Association
