= De Guitenstreken van Jopie Slim en Dickie Bigmans =

- Directed by: Jan van Dommelen
- Based on: Billy Bimbo and Peter Porker by Harry Folkard
- Produced by: Neerlandia Smalfilmorganisatie
- Starring: George Ligtvoet; Mevrouw Roza; Meneer Roza; Jan Springer
- Release date: 5 February 1939
- Running time: 75 minutes.
- Country: Netherlands
- Language: Dutch

De Guitenstreken van Jopie Slim en Dickie Bigmans (The Jolly Pranks of Jopie Slim and Dickie Bigmans) is a 1939 Dutch children's film based a popular British comic strip, Billy Bimbo and Peter Porker by Harry Folkard, which ran in The London Evening News but became far more popular in the Netherlands under its translation Jopie Slim en Dickie Bigmans. The picture was an amateur movie made for youth halls and children's matinées.

== Plot ==
The film follows Jopie and Dickie as they play pranks on their environment and are punished for it.

== Cast ==
- George Ligtvoet: Dickie Bigmans
- Jan van Dommelen, jr.: Jopie Slim
- Jan Springer: Friend of Jopie and Dickie
- Henk Teune: Policeman
- Pedro Beukman: Father miller
- Tine Beukman: Amalia Kippig
