= Stacia Kane =

American novelist

- Occupation: Novelist
- Writing career
- Genre: Urban Fantasy
- Website: www.staciakane.net

Stacia Kane is an American writer of romantic erotica, urban fantasy, and horror. Kane lives outside of Atlanta, Georgia with her British husband and their daughters.

In the past, she worked as a phone psychic, a customer service representative, a bartender, and a movie theatre usher. She has also worked for over four years in professional publishing.

== Bibliography ==
The Megan Chase series (the Demons books):

- "Personal Demons" (Simon & Schuster Adult Publishing, May 2008)
- "Demon Inside" (Simon & Schuster Adult Publishing Group, August 2009)
- "Demon Possessed" (Simon & Schuster Adult Publishing Group, February 2010)

The Chess Putnam series (the Downside books):

- "Unholy Ghosts" (Random House Publishing Group, May 2010)
- "Unholy Magic" (Publishing Group, July 2010)
- "City of Ghosts" (Random House Publishing Group, July 2010)
- "Sacrificial Magic" (Random House Publishing Group, March 2012)
- "Chasing Magic" (Random House Publishing Group, June 2012)
- "Untitled" (Random House Publishing Group, June 2013)

Writing as December Quinn:

- "Prince of Death" (Whiskey Creek Press, January 2007)
- "Blood Will Tell" (Ellora's Cave Publishing Inc., July 2007)
- "Eighth Wand" (Ellora's Cave Publishing Inc., October 2007)
- "Day of the Dead" (Ellora's Cave Publishing Inc., March 2008)
- "Accustomed to His Fangs" (Ellora's Cave Publishing Inc., October 2008)

Non-fiction:

- "Be A Sex-Writing Strumpet" (Lulu Press, March 2010)
