= Brenda Novak =

American novelist

- Born: 1964 (age 61–62); Vernal, Utah, U.S.
- Occupation: Novelist
- Writing career
- Pen name: Brenda Novak
- Period: 1998–present
- Genres: historical romance, contemporary romance, romantic suspense
- Website: www.brendanovak.com

Brenda Novak (born in 1964 in Vernal, Utah) is an American author of historical romance, contemporary romance, and romantic suspense. She has authored over 50 books.

== Bibliography ==
Whiskey Creek

- Discovering You, 5/2016—MIRA Books
- A Winter Wedding, 10/2015—MIRA Books
- This Heart of Mine, 3/2015—MIRA Books
- The Heart of Christmas, 10/2014—MIRA Books
- Come Home To Me, 3/2014—MIRA Books
- Take Me Home for Christmas, 10/2013—MIRA Books
- Home to Whiskey Creek, 7/2013—MIRA Books
- When Summer Comes, 1/2013, MIRA Books
- When Snow Falls, 10/2012—MIRA Books
- When Lightning Strikes, 8/2012—MIRA Books
- When We Touch (prequel novella), 8/2012

Fairham Island

- The Secrets She Kept, 7/2016—MIRA Books
- The Secret Sister, 7/2015—MIRA Books

The Evelyn Talbot Chronicles

- Hanover House (prequel novella), 9/2015—Brenda Novak, Inc.
- Her Darkest Nightmare, 8/2016—St. Martin's Press
- Hello Again, 10/2017—St. Martin's Press
- Face Off, 8/2018—St. Martin's Press
- Blind Spot, 8/2019—St. Martin's Press

Historical Romance

- A Matter of Grave Concern, 10/2014 - Montlake
- Through The Smoke, 10/2013 - Montlake
- Honor Bound (original title: The Bastard), 11/2011
- Of Noble Birth, 11/99 (HarperCollins), reprint 3/2011

Bulletproof Series

- Inside, 7/2011 - MIRA Books
- In Seconds, 9/2011 - MIRA Books
- In Close, 11/2011 - MIRA Books

Dept. 6 Hired Guns Series

- Killer Heat, 10/2010 – MIRA Books
- Body Heat, 9/2010 – MIRA Books
- White Heat, 8/2010 – MIRA Books

Last Stand Series

- The Perfect Murder, 10/2009 – MIRA Books
- The Perfect Liar, 9/2009 – MIRA Books
- The Perfect Couple, 8/2009 – MIRA Books
- Watch Me, 8/2008 – MIRA Books
- Stop Me, 7/2008 – MIRA Books
- Trust Me, 6/2008 – MIRA Books

Stillwater Series

- Dead Right, 8/2007 – MIRA Books
- Dead Giveaway, 2/2007 – MIRA Books
- Dead Silence, 8/2006 – MIRA Books

Single Title

- Every Waking Moment, 7/2005, Harlequin
- Cold Feet, 2/2005, Harlequin
- Taking the Heat, 2/2004, Harlequin

Harlequin Superromance (Dundee, Idaho Series)

- That One Night (original title: A Baby of Her Own), 9/2002
- A Husband of Her Own, 5/2003
- A Family of Her Own, 4/2004
- A Home of Her Own, 12/2004
- Stranger In Town, 6/2005
- Big Girls Don't Cry, 9/2005
- The Other Woman, 5/2006
- Coulda Been a Cowboy, 6/2007
- That Christmas Feeling, 11/2010

Harlequin Superromance (Silver Springs Series)

- Finding Our Forever, 4/2017
- No One But You, 6/2017
- Until You Loved Me, 8/2017
- Right Where We Belong, 11/2017
- Unforgettable You, 2/2019
- Christmas in Silver Springs, 10/2019
- A California Christmas, expected in 9/2020

Harlequin Superromance

- Sanctuary
- Shooting the Moon
- We Saw Mommy Kissing Santa Claus
- Dear Maggie
- Baby Business
- Snow Baby
- Expectations

== Anthologies in collaboration ==
- Love Is Murder, 2/2013 (With Allison Brennan, Sherrilyn Kenyon, Heather Graham, Lee Child and Edited by Sandra Brown)
- More Than Words, 2/2012 (with Debbie Macomber and Meryl Sawyer)
- Once Upon a Christmas, 10/2011 (with Melinda Curtis and Anna Adams)
- That Christmas Feeling, 11/2010 (with Kathleen O'Brien and Karina Bliss)
- The Night Before Christmas, 11/2009 (with Day LeClaire and Molly O'Keefe)
- Mother, Please! (2004) (with Alison Kent and Jill Shalvis)
- More Than Words (2004) (with Susan Mallery, Diana Palmer, Carla Neggers, and Emilie Richards)
- Family of Her Own / Brother Quest (2004) (with Lori Handeland)
- Omnibus : Snow Angels (2004) (with B. J. Daniels)
- Baby Jane / We Saw Mummy Kissing Santa Claus / Wide Open Spaces (2004) (with Roz Denny Fox and Judith Arnold)
- Sanctuary, 12/2003 (with Pamela Bauer, Judith Bowen, K.N. Casper, Laura Abbot and Caron Todd)

== Awards and reception ==
- 2009 - Romantic Times Reviewers' Choice Award finalist, Romantic Intrigue – The Perfect Murder
