= The Adventures of Kit Carson =

American TV Western series (1951–1955)

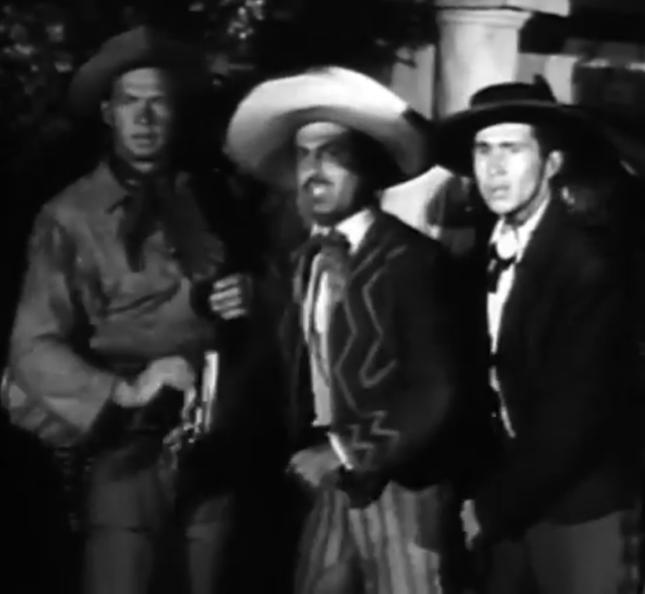
- Bill Williams, Don Diamond and Neyle Morrow in The Adventures of Kit Carson
- Genre: Western
- Inspired by: Kit Carson
- Directed by: John English; Lew Landers; Paul Landres; Philip Ford; Charles S. Gould; Derwin Abrahams; Will Sheldon; Norman Lloyd
- Starring: Bill Williams; Don Diamond
- Country of origin: United States
- Original language: English
- No. of seasons: 4
- No. of episodes: 104 (list of episodes)

Production
- Producers: Leon Fromkess; Richard Irving
- Cinematography: Clark Ramsey; Joe Novack; John Macburnie; Jack Greenhalgh; Jack MacKenzie
- Camera setup: Single-Camera
- Running time: 30 minutes
- Production company: Revue Productions

Original release
- Network: Syndication
- Release: August 11, 1951 – November 22, 1955

The Adventures of Kit Carson is an American Western television series that aired from 1951 to 1955 and consisted of 104 episodes. While airing, the show was shown in over 130 markets and was sold to the Coca-Cola Bottling Company by MCA-TV. After airing, MCA-TV acquired syndication rights to the show. In New York, the show aired on Tuesday evenings on WNBT (TV) and ran for thirty-minutes. The show starred Bill Williams in the title role as frontier scout Christopher "Kit" Carson, and Don Diamond co-starred as El Toro, Carson's Mexican companion.

Though the show may have been inspired by the historic Kit Carson, it is not historically accurate.

== Premise ==
The show is set in the Wild West in the late 19th century. Carson and El Toro, his Mexican partner, travel around the American West helping people.

== Cast ==
=== Main ===
- Bill Williams as Kit Carson (103 Episodes)
- Don Diamond as El Toro (103 Episodes)

=== Notable guests ===
- John Cason as Carl Rigby, Deputy, Drayson's Henchman, Henchman Ben, Henchman Carson, Henchman Trig, Lead Henchman, Marshal Trent, Morgan, Porter, Stage Driver, Trigger Dawson, Wagon driver Morris
- Peter Mamakos as El Broho, Benito Morales a.k.a. El Morosco, Henchman Spence, Hernandez, Marco Mesconti, Padre Diego, Ricardo
- Boyd Stockman as Henchman, Henchman Joe, Henchman Pete, Last Stage Driver, Murdock
- Carol Henry as Henchman, Deputy, Garth, Hadley Man, Hank, Ned, Outlaw
- Tristam Coffin as Col. Culver, Maj. John Phelps, Malee, Mark Stacey, Padre, Taggart, The Baron
- Richard Avonden as Don Felope, Barker, Captured Henchman, Henchman Wolf
- Terry Frost as Commandant, Henchman, Langley, Sheriff
- Jeanne Cooper as Joyce Hadley

== Episodes ==
Season	Episodes	Originally released	
Season	Episodes	First released	Last released
1	26	August 11, 1951	February 2, 1952
2	26	August 2, 1952	January 24, 1953
3	26	August 1, 1953	January 30, 1954
4	26	July 31, 1954	January 22, 1955

== Production ==
The show was produced by Revue Productions. Although Kit Carson was a real historical character, the show was far removed from historical fact. For example, the show is set in the 1880s, but the real Kit Carson died in 1868. Carson was a mountain man, guide, and trapper; not a cowboy or a lawman as portrayed in the series.

Eric Taylor, who had written numerous early horror scripts such as Son of Dracula and The Ghost of Frankenstein in the 1940s, was hired on a script writer for Kit Carson. As many as a total of 678 actors were used in filming for mounted posses, outlaw gangs, townsfolk, and other assorted characters. Production operations employed 245 different sets, with 135 interior sets and 110 exterior backgrounds. Roughly half of the working days were on location, many of which were the historical sites of the stories being filmed.

KETV held a pony drawing contest for children to promote The Adventures of Kit Carson. The promotion was targeted at children to determine who could draw the best horse. The winner of the competition received a real Shetland pony.

Trying to reach the youth market through the medium of television, Coca-Cola signed on as a sponsor for the show beginning in 1951.

== Reception ==
During its second season, The Adventures of Kit Carson became the most watched children's Western on television. According to Variety, in 1954, the show reached more children's homes than any other series, with an estimated 3.5 million households.

During The Adventures of Kit Carson's original run, the show was generally well-received. The show saw several good reviews in trade press publications at the time.

Variety said that the show "fit like a glove into the groove for which it's patterned; and should keep the juves (and Coca-Cola) happy." Variety also said that Bill Williams and Don Diamond were "just okay."

S.S. Picturegoer called the show "energetic and likeable" but also critiqued the direction of the show. Additionally, they stated the plot was "well-constructed" and applauded the acting of Bill Williams and Don Diamond.
