= Touch the Dark =

Novel

- Front cover of first edition
- Author: Karen Chance
- Language: English
- Series: Cassandra Palmer
- Subject: Vampires, Supernatural
- Genre: Urban fantasy
- Publisher: Roc Books
- Publication date: June 2006
- Publication place: United States
- Media type: Print (paperback)
- Pages: 307
- ISBN: 0-451-46093-6
- OCLC: 69662971
- Followed by: Claimed by Shadow

Touch the Dark is the first book in The Cassandra Palmer series, written by best-selling author Karen Chance. The book introduces the series heroine, Cassandra "Cassie" Palmer, as well as several other series regulars.

== Synopsis ==
Cassandra Palmer can see the future and communicate with spirits-talents that make her attractive to the dead and the undead. The ghosts of the dead aren't usually dangerous; they just like to talk...a lot. The undead are another matter.

Like any sensible girl, Cassie tries to avoid vampires. But when the bloodsucking Mafioso she escaped three years ago finds Cassie again with vengeance on his mind, she's forced to turn to the vampire Senate for protection. The undead senators won't help her for nothing, and Cassie finds herself working with one of their most powerful members, a dangerously seductive master vampire-and the price he demands may be more than Cassie is willing to pay...

== Characters ==
=== Cassandra "Cassie" Palmer ===
Cassandra Palmer is the lead character in seven novels: Touch the Dark, Claimed by Shadow, Embrace the Night, Curse the Dawn, Hunt the Moon, Tempt the Stars and Reap the Wind. A powerful seer, she was brought up by a vampire who wanted to monopolize her gift. She escaped him, but soon her past caught up with her, although not in the way she'd feared. The Pythia, the supernatural community's chief seer, was dying and she tapped Cassie to replace her.

That granted Cassie with power she doesn't know how to use and new foes. To make matters worse, a war has broken out in the supernatural community and everyone is choosing sides. Now, Cassie is trying to stay alive long enough to learn how to use the power of her office, and to determine what to do with it when she finally masters it.

=== John Pritkin ===
John Pritkin is a war mage—a member of the supernatural community's police force—with a specialization in demon killing.

=== Billy Joe ===
When she was seventeen, Cassie bought an "ugly necklace" from a pawn shop and discovered that it was haunted by a ghost named Billy Joe. Now Billy serves as a spy and ally for Cassie, because practically none of the supernatural community can see him.

=== Tomas ===
Tomas was born in Peru during the conquest, the bastard son of a priestess of Inti and a Spanish conquistador. His father didn't stay around long enough to impart his surname—or much of anything else—but Tomas could have taken his master's name once a life-challenged Spanish nobleman took a liking to him. But after being forcibly changed into a vampire and treated as a slave for four hundred years, he wasn't feeling too chummy. Now, all he wants is his hated master dead—permanently. He'll figure out the rest later.

=== Rafe ===
Raphael was a vampire under Tony's control, who acted somewhat as a father figure to Cassie.

=== Mircea Basarab ===
Mircea Basarab is a bridge character, playing an important role in both the Cassandra Palmer and Dorina Basarab novels. He also has his own book, Masks, describing some of his history. And he has a lot of it, being a five-hundred-year-old master vampire and a member of the powerful Vampire Senate.

The Senate is currently vying with the Silver Circle, the world's chief magical organization, for control of the new Pythia—and the power she commands. That puts Cassie in a bad position (as if she's ever in anything else). She's personally drawn to Mircea, but sometimes suspects that his interest might have more to do with her power than with her person.

Other times, she's not sure she cares.

=== Francoise ===
Francoise doesn't have a last name because she was born a poor village girl in seventeenth century France. She doesn't have much of anything else, either, after being transported to the twenty-first century through a series of alarming events. Well, that's not entirely true. She still has her magic—and while it's seriously outdated, at least the Inquisition isn't after her anymore. And she has a new boyfriend who would be perfect if he wasn't possessed by an ancient demon. But Francoise has learned the hard way—you have to take what you can get out of life. And she's busy taking everything she can.

=== Tony ===
A vampire mob boss and Cassie's former guardian.

=== The Consul ===
The Consul is featured in both the Cassie Palmer and Dorina Basarab series, something she would say is only her right as the leader of the dreaded North American Vampire Senate. And no one is likely to argue with her, since she is as powerful as she is beautiful, and as deadly as the snakes that serve as her emblem. And speaking of power, she wants Cassie's under the control of the senate and no one else.

It is needed because the consul is currently involved in a struggle with the leaders of the other five senates for control of the vampire world. That world is at war and must unite or perish. But unity implies a single ruler, something that has never happened in all of vampire history. And the other leaders also want the top spot. So whether Cassie likes it or not, she has just become the consul's ace in the hole.
