= Shoshanna Evers =

American writer (1980–2021)

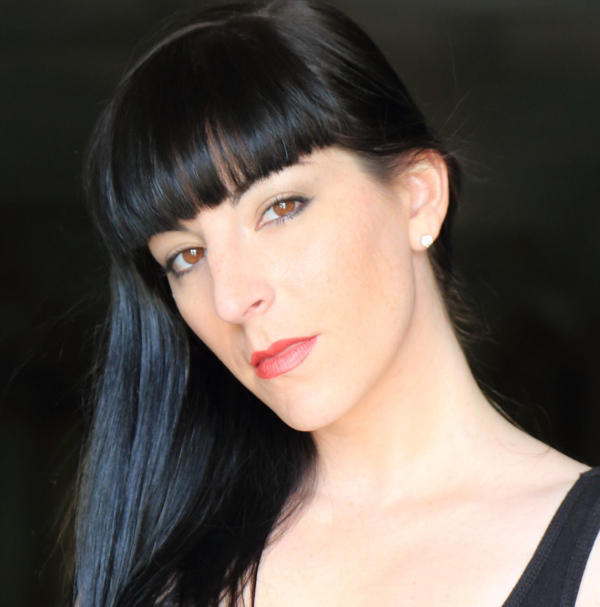
- Born: April 1980
- Died: September 11, 2021 (aged 41)
- Occupations: Novelist, romance

Shana Sturtz Brodsky (April 1980 – September 11, 2021), known by her pen names Shoshanna Evers and Shoshanna Gabriel, was an American author of contemporary and erotic romance novels and novellas, and the editor and publisher of non-fiction books on writing and publishing. She was the co-founder of SelfPubBookCovers.com, the first website where authors could customize original pre-made book covers and instantly download them. Shoshanna Evers was also listed as one of the “Most Popular Authors in Erotica” on Amazon.com in 2013, and one of the "Most Popular Authors in Contemporary Romance," and "Most Popular Authors in Romance" on Amazon.com in 2014.

In March 2014, Evers became a New York Times and USA Today bestselling author with her contribution of "The Man Who Holds the Whip" to the anthology MAKE ME: Twelve Tales of Dark Desire.

== Biography and career ==
Evers was first published in 2010 by Ellora's Cave Publishing. She wrote for Simon & Schuster in addition to self-publishing. Before becoming a full-time author, Evers worked as a registered nurse under her married name.

Her work has been critically acclaimed with reviewers calling her the “Queen of the erotic novellas”, who writes books that are “emotional and gripping”.

Shoshanna Evers wrote dozens of erotic romance stories including Overheated and Enslaved, Book One in the Enslaved Trilogy, both of which hit the Amazon Erotica Bestseller list.

The non-fiction anthology Shoshanna Evers edited and contributed to, How To Write Hot Sex: Tips from Multi-Published Erotic Romance Authors, became a #1 Authorship Bestseller, #1 Erotica Writing Reference Bestseller, #1 Romance Writing Bestseller, and a Writing Skills Bestseller. Her work has been featured in Best Bondage Erotica 2012 and Best Bondage Erotica 2013, the Penguin/Berkley Heat anthology Agony/Ecstasy, and numerous erotic BDSM novellas with Ellora's Cave Publishing including Chastity Belt and Punishing the Art Thief.

Her BDSM erotic romance series The Enslaved Trilogy released April 2013 from Simon & Schuster’s Pocket Star imprint, and will be followed in November 2013 by The Pulse Trilogy, a dystopian post-apocalyptic erotic romance series. Evers was a New York native who lived with her husband, their three children and two dogs on a remote farm in Northern Idaho at the time of her death.

== Bibliography ==
The Enslaved Trilogy (BDSM Billionaire Erotic Romance)

- ENSLAVED, Book One in The Enslaved Trilogy (Simon & Schuster/Pocket Star) April 2013
- ENAMORED, Book Two in The Enslaved Trilogy (Simon & Schuster/Pocket Star) May 2013
- ENRAPTURED, Book Three in The Enslaved Trilogy (Simon & Schuster/Pocket Star) June 2013

The Pulse Trilogy (Post-Apocalyptic Dystopian Erotic Romance)

- THE PULSE, Book One in The Pulse Trilogy (Simon & Schuster/Pocket Star) November 2013
- THE ESCAPE, Book Two in The Pulse Trilogy (Simon & Schuster/Pocket Star) January 2014
- THE THRUST, Book Three in The Pulse Trilogy (Simon & Schuster/Pocket Star) March 2014

Mainstream Contemporary Romance

- THE TYCOON’S CONVENIENT BRIDE…AND BABY (Entangled Publishing/Indulgence) (not yet released)

Anthologies

- MAKE ME: Twelve Tales of Dark Desire (The Man Who Holds the Whip) Skye Warren anthology, March 2014 (#16 New York Times ebook bestseller list March 23rd, 2014, #48 USA Today Bestseller List March 9th, 2014)
- SMOKIN’ HOT FIREMEN (Falling Ashes) Cleis Press anthology, July 2013
- BABY GOT BACK (Body Heat) Cleis Press anthology, August 2013
- THE BIG BOOK OF ORGASM (Forced Orgasms) Cleis Press anthology, September 2013
- CAN'T GET ENOUGH (Blake Eats Out) Cleis Press anthology, June 2014
- COWBOY HEAT (Drop Two Tears in a Bucket Cleis Press anthology, March 2014

2014

- BEAUTY AND THE BEAST: An Erotic Re-Imagining,(Shoshanna Evers) February 2014

2013

- BEST BONDAGE EROTICA 2013 (Plastic Wrap) (Cleis Press, 2013)
- HOW WE DO IT (AND HOW YOU CAN TOO), edited by Shoshanna Evers (non-fiction, self-published, 2013) Top 25 on Amazon Business Writing Bestseller List, Kobo Publishing Bestseller.

2012

- SKIN DEEP, (Ellora's Cave Publishing, 2012) a print anthology containing Bedhead as well as novellas by Desiree Holt and Lynne Connolly.
- HELD CAPTIVE BY THE CAVEMEN (self-published, 2012)
- THE MAN WHO HOLDS THE WHIP (self-published, 2012)
- BEST BONDAGE EROTICA 2012 (Melting Ice) (Cleis Press, 2012)
- AGONY/ECSTASY (The Wooden Pony) (Penguin/Berkley Heat, 2012)
- FELT TIPS (Tape) a charity anthology edited and published by Tiffany Reisz, 2012
- Dominatrix Fantasy Trilogy Set: SPANKED, DENIED, and COLLARED (Paperback was Amazon Erotica Bestseller) (self-published, 2012)
- SPANKED, Dominatrix Fantasy Novella 1 (self-published, 2012)
- DENIED, Dominatrix Fantasy Novella 2 (self-published, 2012)
- COLLARED, Dominatrix Fantasy Novella 3 (self-published, 2012)

2011

- OVERHEATED (self-published, 2011) A short story, over 20K copies sold, Amazon Erotica Bestseller.
- HOW TO WRITE HOT SEX: Tips from Multi-Published Erotic Romance Authors, edited by Shoshanna Evers (non-fiction, self-published, 2011) #1 Bestseller on the Amazon Authorship, Erotic Writing, and Romance Writing bestseller lists. Kobo Publishing Bestseller
- SNOWED IN WITH THE TYCOON (self-published, 2011)
- BEDHEAD (Ellora's Cave Publishing, 2011)
- CHASTITY BELT (Ellora's Cave Publishing, 2011)
- HOLLYWOOD SPANK (Ellora's Cave Publishing, 2011)
- TASTE OF CANDY (The Wild Rose Press, 2011)
- BOUND TO BE NAUGHTY (Ellora's Cave Publishing, 2011) trade paperback anthology featuring Punishing the Art Thief, Chastity Belt, and Hollywood Spank.

2010

- PUNISHING THE ART THIEF (Ellora's Cave Publishing, 2010)
- GINGER SNAP (Ellora's Cave Publishing, 2010)
