= List of The Adventures of Kit Carson episodes =

The Adventures of Kit Carson is an American Western that aired from 1951 to 1955 and consisted of 104 episodes. While airing, the show was shown in over 130 markets and was sold to the Coca-Cola Bottling Company by MCA-TV. After airing, MCA-TV acquired syndication rights to the show. In New York, the show aired on Tuesday evenings on WNBT (TV) and ran for thirty-minutes. The show starred Bill Williams in the title role as frontier scout Christopher "Kit" Carson, and Don Diamond co-starred as El Toro, Carson's Mexican companion. Though the show may have been inspired by the historic Kit Carson, it is not historically accurate.

== Series overview ==
Season	Episodes	Originally released	
Season	Episodes	First released	Last released
1	26	August 11, 1951	February 2, 1952
2	26	August 2, 1952	January 24, 1953
3	26	August 1, 1953	January 30, 1954
4	26	July 31, 1954	January 22, 1955

== Episodes ==
=== Season 1 (1951–52) ===
No. overall	No. in season	Title	Original release date
1	1	"California Outlaws"	August 11, 1951
2	2	"Prince of Padua Hills"	August 18, 1951
3	3	"Road to Monterey"	August 25, 1951
4	4	"Padres Treasure"	September 1, 1951
5	5	"The Murango Story"	September 8, 1951
6	6	"Rides of Capistrano"	September 15, 1951
7	7	"Enemies of the West"	September 22, 1951
8	8	"Law of Six Guns"	September 29, 1951
9	9	"The Devil Angel's Camp"	October 6, 1951
10	10	"Law of the Frontier"	October 13, 1951
11	11	"The Road to El Dorado"	October 20, 1951
12	12	"Fury at Red Gulch"	October 27, 1951
13	13	"Outlaws of Manzanita"	November 3, 1951
14	14	"The Desperate Sheriff"	November 10, 1951
15	15	"Hero of Hermosa"	November 17, 1951
16	16	"A Ticket to Mexico"	November 24, 1951
17	17	"The Return of Trigger Dawson"	December 1, 1951
18	18	"The Teton Tornado"	December 8, 1951
19	19	"Bad Man of Briscoe"	December 15, 1951
20	20	"Spoilers of California"	December 22, 1951
21	21	"Feud in San Felipe"	December 29, 1951
22	22	"The Trap"	January 5, 1952
23	23	"Border Corsairs"	January 12, 1952
24	24	"Curse of the Albas"	January 19, 1952
25	25	"Bandit's Blade"	January 26, 1952
26	26	"The Marauder of Madera"	February 2, 1952

=== Season 2 (1952–53) ===
No. overall	No. in season	Title	Original release date
27	1	"Snake River Trappers"	August 2, 1952
28	2	"Baron of Black Springs"	August 9, 1952
29	3	"Danger Hill"	August 16, 1952
30	4	"Wild Horses of Pala"	August 23, 1952
31	5	"Trail to Fort Hazard"	August 30, 1952
32	6	"Warwhoop"	September 6, 1952
33	7	"Outlaw Paradise"	September 13, 1952
34	8	"Powdersnake Trail"	September 20, 1952
35	9	"Trouble in Tuscarora"	September 27, 1952
36	10	"Trail to Old Sonora"	October 4, 1952
37	11	"Road to Destiny"	October 11, 1952
38	12	"Border Town"	October 18, 1952
39	13	"Roaring Challenge"	October 25, 1952
40	14	"Range Masters"	November 1, 1952
41	15	"Thunder Over Inyo"	November 8, 1952
42	16	"Pledge to Danger"	November 15, 1952
43	17	"Golden Snare"	November 22, 1952
44	18	"Singing Wires"	November 29, 1952
45	19	"Mojave Desperados"	December 6, 1952
46	20	"Highway to Doom"	December 13, 1952
47	21	"Hideout"	December 20, 1952
48	22	"Broken Spur"	December 27, 1952
49	23	"Ventura Feud"	January 3, 1953
50	24	"Bad Men of Marysville"	January 10, 1953
51	25	"Claim Jumpers of Juniper"	January 17, 1953
52	26	"Mask of the Vigilantes"	January 24, 1953

=== Season 3 (1953–54) ===
No. overall	No. in season	Title	Original release date
53	1	"Outlaw Trail"	August 1, 1953
54	2	"Savage Outpost"	August 8, 1953
55	3	"Hawk Raiders"	August 15, 1953
56	4	"Widow of Indian Wells"	August 22, 1953
57	5	"The Law of Boot Hill"	August 29, 1953
58	6	"Trouble at Fort Mojave"	September 5, 1953
59	7	"Powdersmoke Law"	September 12, 1953
60	8	"Secret Sheriff"	September 19, 1953
61	9	"Outlaw Army"	September 26, 1953
62	10	"Lost Treasure of Panamint"	October 3, 1953
63	11	"Frontier Mail"	October 10, 1953
64	12	"Open Season"	October 17, 1953
65	13	"Gunsmoke Justice"	October 24, 1953
66	14	"Challenge to Chance"	October 31, 1953
67	15	"Marshall of Gun Town"	November 7, 1953
68	16	"Uprising at Pawhuska"	November 14, 1953
69	17	"Army Renegades"	November 21, 1953
70	18	"Badman's Escape"	November 28, 1953
71	19	"Haunted Hacienda"	December 5, 1953
72	20	"Gunsmoke Valley"	December 12, 1953
73	21	"Renegade Wires"	December 19, 1953
74	22	"Ambush"	December 26, 1953
75	23	"Dry Creek Chase"	January 9, 1954
76	24	"Copper Town"	January 16, 1954
77	25	"Counterfeit County"	January 23, 1954
78	26	"Cache"	January 30, 1954

=== Season 4 (1954–55) ===
No. overall	No. in season	Title	Original release date
79	1	"Trails Westward"	July 31, 1954
80	2	"Stampede Fury"	August 7, 1954
81	3	"Bullets of Mystery"	August 14, 1954
82	4	"The Wrong Man"	August 21, 1954
83	5	"Gatling Gun"	August 28, 1954
84	6	"Powder Depot"	September 4, 1954
85	7	"Hermit of Indian Ridge"	September 11, 1954
86	8	"Riders of Hooded League"	September 18, 1954
87	9	"Frontier of Challenge"	September 25, 1954
88	10	"Trail to Bordertown"	October 2, 1954
89	11	"No Man's Law"	October 9, 1954
90	12	"Missing Hacienda"	October 16, 1954
91	13	"Renegades of Rejo"	October 23, 1954
92	14	"Ghost Town Garrison"	October 30, 1954
93	15	"Eyes of the Outlaw"	November 6, 1954
94	16	"The Valiant Outlaw"	November 13, 1954
95	17	"Judge of Black Mesa"	November 20, 1954
96	18	"Frontier Empire"	November 27, 1954
97	19	"Trouble at Sundown"	December 4, 1954
98	20	"Outlaw's Justice"	December 11, 1954
99	21	"Golden Ring of Cibola"	December 18, 1954
100	22	"The Overland Stage"	December 25, 1954
101	23	"Devil's Remuda"	January 1, 1955
102	24	"Phantom Uprising"	January 8, 1955
103	25	"Mission to Alkali"	January 15, 1955
104	26	"Incident at Wagontire"	January 22, 1955
