= Shayla Black =

American erotica novelist

- Born: Shelley Bradley; 1968 (age 57–58)
- Occupation: Writer
- Writing career
- Genres: Romance, erotica
- Website: shaylablack.com

Shelley Bradley (born 1968), who writes under the pen name Shayla Black, is an American author of erotic romance novels. She has written over 80 novels. Several of her novels include references to BDSM. She is most known for her Wicked Lovers series, which includes 12 novels and 7 novellas.

She lives with her family in North Texas.

== Works ==
- Misadventures of a Backup Bride

Wicked Lovers series

- Wicked Ties
- Decadent
- Delicious
- Surrender to Me
- Belong to Me
- Mine to Hold
- Wicked All the Way
- Ours to Love
- Theirs to Cherish
- His to Take
- Wicked for You
- Falling in Deeper
- Holding on Tighter

Masters of Ménage

- Their Virgin Captive
- Their Virgin's Secret
- Their Virgin Concubine
- Their Virgin Princess
- Their Virgin Hostage
- Their Virgin Secretary
- Their Virgin Mistress
