= Ellora's Cave =

American independent erotic fiction publisher

- Status: Defunct 2016
- Founded: 2000
- Founder: Tina Engler
- Country of origin: United States
- Headquarters location: Akron, Ohio
- Publication types: E-books, Books
- Fiction genres: Erotica, Romance
- Official website: www.ellorascave.com

Ellora's Cave was an independent erotic fiction publisher. It was launched in 2000, and initially published in e-book only format and later moved into print. Ellora's Cave published in several genres, which included but were not limited to adult romance, erotica, erotica for men, non-fiction, and traditional romance.

It closed in 2016.

== History ==
The publisher launched in 2000 and initially published erotic fiction, which they dubbed and trademarked "romantica", in e-book only format. Their business model was met with success, which Fayetteville State University professor Sarah S.G. Frantz credited to the publisher offering material that authors and readers would not be able to publish or purchase in many other places. Ellora's Cave later moved into print and in 2012 sold an estimated 200,000 books per month, with their best-selling subgenre stated as BDSM erotic romance.

In 2013 the publisher began experiencing a drop in revenue, which continued into the following year. Ellora's Cave's founder Tina Engler credited this drop to Amazon, particularly their Kindle Direct Publishing program. Citing a decline in sales, the publisher reduced their staff and eliminated several projects in 2014. That same year the book blog Dear Author published an article about the company's financial issues entitled "The Curious Case of Ellora's Cave", which made several claims, including one that authors were not receiving royalty checks. Ellora's Cave responded to the claims, calling them false and filed a defamation lawsuit against Dear Author, citing that the blog irreparably damaged the company. They also stated that the royalty checks were not sent out due to issues with new accounting software. Dear Author responded by filing a counter claim. The suit was settled in 2015, with the terms confidential. Ellora's Cave threatened the Romance Writers of America in May 2016 with a defamation suit over allegations made by the RWA claiming that Ellora's Cave was not paying their authors their full royalties.

In October 2016 author Stacia Kane posted on her website that Ellora's Cave had begun the process of closing and on December 31, 2016 Ellora's Cave shuttered their operations.

== Notable authors from Ellora's Cave ==
- Jaid Black
- Sylvia Day
- Shoshanna Evers
- Stacia Kane
- Angela Knight
- Lora Leigh
- December Quinn
- Shiloh Walker

== See also ==
- List of authors of erotic works
