= Katherine Langhorne Adams =

American painter and printmaker

Katherine Langhorne Adams (1885–1977) was an American painter and printmaker. Other sources give her birthdate as c. 1882 or 1890.

== Biography ==
Born in Plainfield, New Jersey, Adams studied at the Art Students League of New York, where her instructors included John Henry Twachtman and Frank Vincent DuMond. She is known to have exhibited work with artists from the Cos Cob colony in 1912 and 1913, but little else is known about her time in Old Lyme, Connecticut, save for an incident when her bedroom in the Griswold House was mistakenly entered one night by a misdirected male artist.

She traveled extensively in her youth, visiting many parts of Europe and Japan; in the 1930s she lived in Buenos Aires. Somewhere around 1916 she married Benjamin Pettengill Adams, with whom she moved to New York; she thereafter began exhibiting work under her married name. During the 1920s her work appeared in shows at three New York galleries. By the late 1920s, she and her husband had moved to Sneden's Landing in New York's Palisades. There she designed their house, which won first prize in a House Beautiful contest for "the best small house East of the Mississippi". She later moved to Washington, D.C.

During her career she exhibited work at the Art Institute of Chicago, the Cleveland Museum of Art, the Albright Art Gallery, the Philadelphia Museum of Art, and the Corcoran Gallery of Art; her art appeared in exhibits at the National Academy of Design, the Society of Independent Artists, and the National Association of Women Painters and Sculptors, receiving the Marcia Tucker Prize from the last-named organization in 1935 and an honorable mention in 1936. Two of her paintings were submitted to the Panama–Pacific International Exposition in 1915. Adams also lived for a time in Fairfield, Connecticut. She died in Alexandria, Virginia.

== Works ==
As a painter, Adams favored landscape subjects, which she tended to depict in a more abstract fashion described as reminiscent of her teacher Twachtman. Her 1934 oil on canvas Man and Beast is currently in the collection of the Pennsylvania Academy of the Fine Arts. She has been posited as the subject of a 1906 painting by Childe Hassam, The Victorian Chair.
