= Sydney Croft =

English cricketer

Sydney James Croft (14 January 1883 – 16 July 1965) was an English cricketer who played for Kent County Cricket Club.

Croft was born at Gravesend in Kent. He made his first appearance for Kent's Second XI in 1901, playing occasionally until 1907. During the 1902 season he played twice for the county's First XI, making his debut against Lancashire at Old Trafford in May before playing again against Yorkshire in Kent's following match at Bradford. These were Croft's only first-class cricket appearances.

After 1907 Croft had no known appearances for Kent or any other team until the 1920 season when he played one Minor Counties Championship match for Kent Second XI. He died at Dartford in 1965 aged 82.

== Bibliography ==
- Carlaw, Derek (2020). Kent County Cricketers, A to Z: Part One (1806–1914) (PDF). Cardiff: ACS.
