= Laura Abbot =

American novelist

- Born: Kansas City, Missouri, U.S.
- Occupation: Novelist
- Children: 5
- Writing career
- Genre: Romance

Laura Abbot is an American writer of over a dozen romance novels in the Harlequin Superromance and Love Inspired Historical series.

== Early life ==
Laura Abbot was born in Kansas City, Missouri, the eldest of three children. Abbot, a tomboy, spent a great deal of time with her grandmothers, who encouraged her love of reading and writing.

== Career ==
Abbot found college liberating and worked hard to graduate in only three years. She became a teacher, and, for over twenty-five years taught secondary English. After Abbot retired from teaching, she began to write. She sold her first romance novel to Harlequin Enterprises in 1994. Harlequin has since published well over a dozen of her novels, mainly in the SuperRomance and Love Inspired Historical categories. Her novel, My Name is Nell was nominated for a Romantic Times Magazine award for Best Harlequin SuperRomance in 2003. and "You're My Baby" was the winner of the Colorado Romance Writers Award of Excellence in Long Contemporary.

== Bibliography ==
=== Single Novels ===
- Mating for Life 1995/Mar ISBN 978-0373706396
- Trial Courtship 1999/May ISBN 978-0373708437
- A Summer Place 2002/Dec ISBN 978-0373711017
- Second Honeymoon 2005/Sep ISBN 978-0373713004
- A Letter for Annie 2009/Apr ISBN 978-0373783007
- Belleporte Summer (2011) ISBN 978-0373364176
- Change of Heart (2011) ISBN 978-0373364268
- Honeymoon at Home (2011) ISBN 978-0373364329
- A Family Found (2015) ISBN 9780373283132

=== Class Act Series ===
- Class Act 1998/08 ISBN 978-0373708031
- You're My Baby 2002/Apr ISBN 978-0373710591

=== Marriage of Inconvenience Series Multi-Author ===
- This Christmas 1996/Nov ISBN 978-0373707218

=== Women Who Dare Series Multi-Author ===
- Where There's Smoke... 1997/Jun

=== By the Year 2000: Marriage Series Multi-Author ===
- The Wedding Vow 1998/Dec

=== Welcome to Riverbend Series Multi-Author ===
- Homecoming 2000/Sep ISBN 978-0373709373

=== Hometown U.S.A. Series Multi-Author ===
- A Country Practice 2001/Feb ISBN 978-0373709700
- My Name is Nell 2003/Oct ISBN 978-0373711628

=== 9 Months Later Series Multi-Author ===
- You're My Baby 2002/Apr ISBN 978-0373710591

=== Single Father Series Multi-Author ===
- The Wrong Man 2004/Mar (2012) ISBN 978-1459232006

=== Everlasting Love Series Multi-Author ===
- Stranger At The Door 2008/Aug ISBN 978-0373715176

=== Anthologies in collaboration ===
- Sanctuary 2003/Dec (with Pamela Bauer, Judith Bowen, K.N. Casper, Brenda Novak and Caron Todd)
- Baby in the House / My Name is Nell 2004/Jan (with Pamela Bauer)
- Wrong Man / Daddy Quest 2004/May (with Lori Handeland) ISBN 978-0733552854
- Stranger at the Door / To Save a Family 2008/Oct (with Anna DeStefano) ISBN 978-0373715176
