= Tina Engler =

American author

Tina Marie Engler (born January 22, 1972), better known under the pen name Jaid Black, is an American author of erotic romance novels. Engler, the founder and majority stock holder of Ellora's Cave publishing, is behind the creation of what Ellora's Cave has trademarked Romantica, a fusion of the erotica and romance genres in popular English literature. Romantic Times magazine gave her their first ever Trailblazer Award, both for her Romantica contribution to the romance genre, as well as for her role in popularizing the e-book.

== Professional life ==
Engler is best known for her books penned under the pseudonym Jaid Black, as well as for her rise from welfare recipient to millionaire entrepreneur. Having had several novels rejected by Harlequin Enterprises and major New York publishing houses, she began privately selling her work in digital form – by email and on CD-ROM. She founded Ellora's Cave in 2000 as a way to self-publish, and by 2012 the company had a revenue of US$10 million per year, primarily retailing through Amazon.

Engler is significant for her contribution to the erotic romance genre. She once told a reporter: "I provided something that wasn't out there at the time. It's kind of heady when I think about it." She was quoted in the Los Angeles Times as stating: "[Erotic romance] legitimizes the female sexual experience. Women read these books and it makes them feel normal about their own fantasies."

== Early life ==
Engler was born in Salem, Ohio on January 22, 1972, to Patricia "Patty" Robb Marks and Mark Engler. Her parents divorced when she was 4-years-old and she was subsequently moved to Cuyahoga Falls, Ohio where she was raised by her mother. When Tina was age 10, Patty remarried Charles "Chuck" Marks and the family moved to Akron, Ohio. At age 15, Engler and her family once again moved to Tampa, Florida, where she would live until she returned to Akron at age 29.

== Personal life ==
Engler has two daughters, Jasmine (b April 25, 1990) and Jade (b August 9, 1997), for which Engler's distribution company Jasmine-Jade Enterprises is named. Engler has been very public about her ongoing struggle with agoraphobia and panic disorder.

== Political activism ==
Engler is an active campaigner for the rights of prisoners and the economically disadvantaged. She served on the board of directors for the Tampa, Florida, chapter of the National Organization for Women through her early to mid twenties. A photograph of her at a political rally protesting cuts to the welfare system still adorns the banner of the Florida NOW National Organization for Women website.

== Books ==
- [Politically Incorrect 01] – Stalked
- After The Storm
- Before The Fire
- Besieged
- Breeding Ground
- Death Row series
  - The Fugitive
  - The Hunter
  - The Avenger
  - The Mastering
- Deep, Dark, And Dangerous
- Seeds of Yesterday
- Lawyers in Love
- God of Fire
- Devilish Dot(Manaconda)
- Obsession
- Possession
- Seeds Of Yesterday
- Sins of the Father
- Strictly Taboo
  - BARBARIAN
  - NEMESIS
  - NAUGHTY NANCY
- The Hunger
- Trek Mi Q'an
  - Guide To Trek Mi Q'an
  - The Empress's New Clothes
  - No Mercy
  - Enslaved
  - No Escape
  - Naughty Nancy
  - No Fear
  - Dementia
  - Never A Slave
  - Seized
- Tremors
- Vanished
- Warlord
- Hunter's Oath(Playing easy to get)
