= Jan Springer =

Dutch architect (1850–1915)

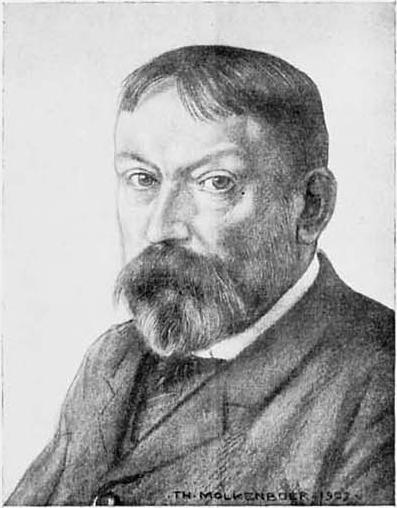
Jan Springer, portrait by Theo Molkenboer (pencil on paper, 1907)

Johannes Ludovicus ("Jan") Springer (Groningen, 27 January 1850 – The Hague, 28 May 1915) was a Dutch architect. He played a major role in the professionalization of the practice of architecture in the Netherlands during the late nineteenth century through the association Architectura et Amicitia, and from 1906 until his death he was the director of the Royal Academy of Visual Arts (Koninklijke Academie van Beeldende Kunsten) in The Hague.

== Life and career ==
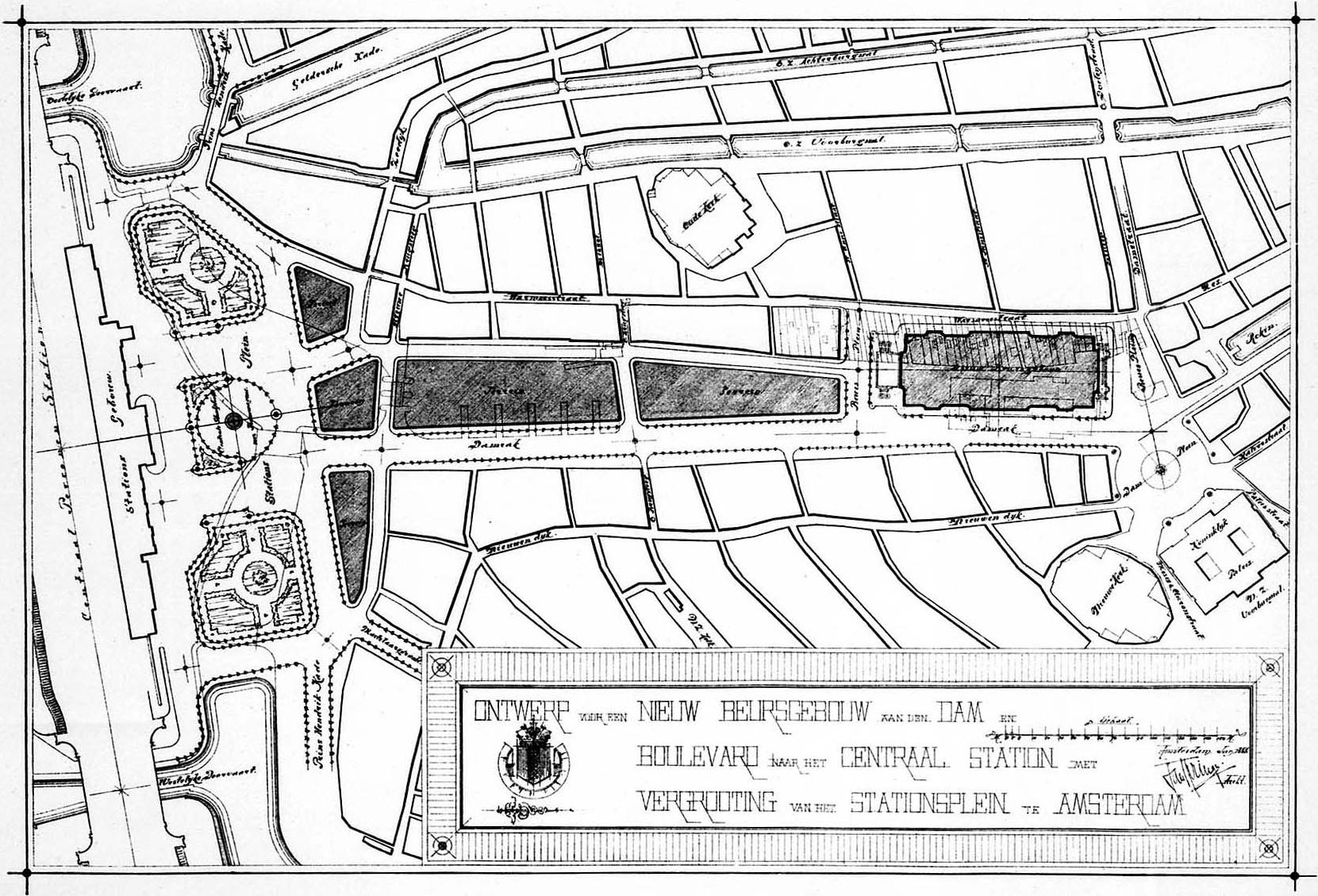
Jan Springer, Alternative plan for the Amsterdam Chamber of Commerce, 1888.

Springer was the son of Amsterdam's assistant city architect, Willem Springer. He made his name as an architect at a young age, as at just age 19, in 1869, he became a member of the Amsterdam architectural association Architectura et Amicitia, and shortly thereafter, in 1871, he became secretary, and in 1876, its chairman. During his sixteen-year presidency, he transformed A et A from a friendly social gathering of Amsterdam architects into a national organization with a noticeable influence on the development of architecture and design. The most important event in this process was A et A's reorganization in 1882 that transformed it formally into a "society" with distinct membership. The following year A et A founded its own engineering journal, De Opmerker. To make the general public aware of the activities of A et A and to improve the expertise of the group's members, Springer also organized numerous exhibitions and lectures for the group.

In 1888 Springer was commissioned by the Amsterdam Chamber of Commerce to design a new stock exchange for Adolph Willem Krasnapolsky (see Beurs van Berlage). The entrepreneurs had major objections to the design of municipal architect Adriaan Willem Weissman that the year before had been proposed to the municipal council, in part to put an end to the hated stock market tax that traders had had to pay since it had been instituted in 1882. The grant proposed by Krasnapolsky was to be financed "from private funds and from the proceeds from the entrances...and from the rents of shops, offices, monster rooms, etc." Krasnapolsky's request was sent to the council together with Springer's design on February 16, 1888. However, the objections of the Chamber of Commerce against the municipal plan were rebuffed on 22 February, but the council soon reconsidered.

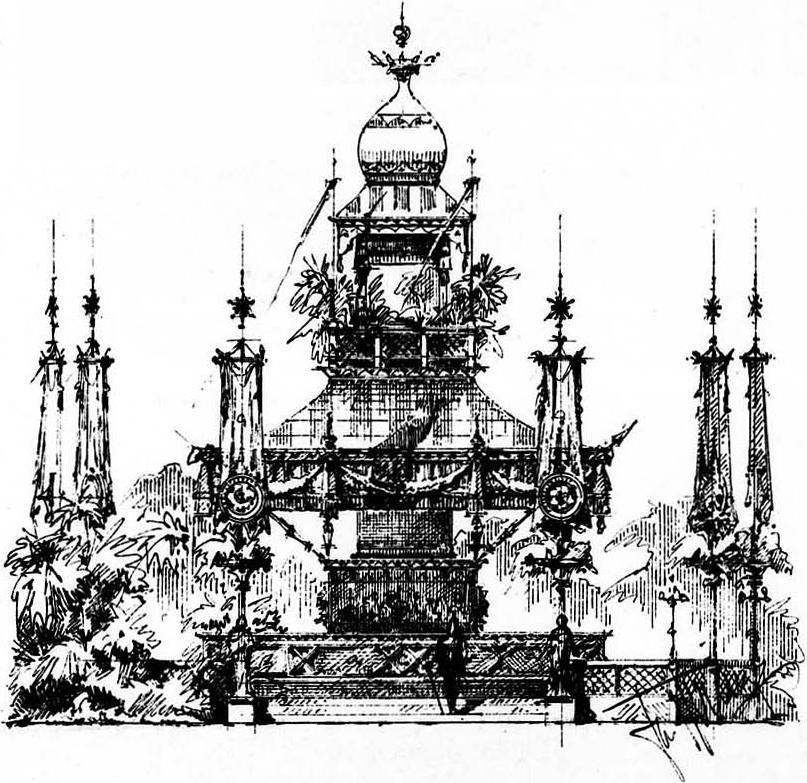
Springer's champagne kiosk at the Fancy Fair, Amsterdam, 1887.

However, around 1890 his position within A et A changed, as a new generation of architects, interested in more radical artistic currents and influenced by P.J.H. Cuypers, emerged. Springer sensed this and resigned in 1892 as chairman. At the same time, he was getting less and less satisfaction from his practice, as no matter how gifted he was as a designer, he was inept as a businessman and was therefore unable to establish himself as an independent architect, let alone manage an architectural firm. Eventually he moved to The Hague, where he served as director of the art academy from 1906 until his death. Nevertheless, he left behind a number of impressive buildings in Amsterdam. He also designed various festival sets, such as those of the 1884 celebration in the Maison Stroucken on the occasion of the 70th birthday of King Willem III and the so-called "Fancy Fair" in 1887 at the Paleis voor Volksvlijt.

Having passed in late May 1915, on 1 June he was buried in the presence of A et A chairman Paul de Jongh and his former friends Henri Evers, JA van Voorthuysen, K. Sluyterman, Jonas Ingenohl and E. Stark in the Oud Eik and Duinen cemetery in The Hague.

== Works ==
- Maritime training school, Prins Hendrikkade, Amsterdam.
- Nierop House, Amsterdam.
- Stadsschouwburg (Municipal theatre), Amsterdam.

== See also ==
- List of Dutch architects
