= Keri Arthur =

Australian writer

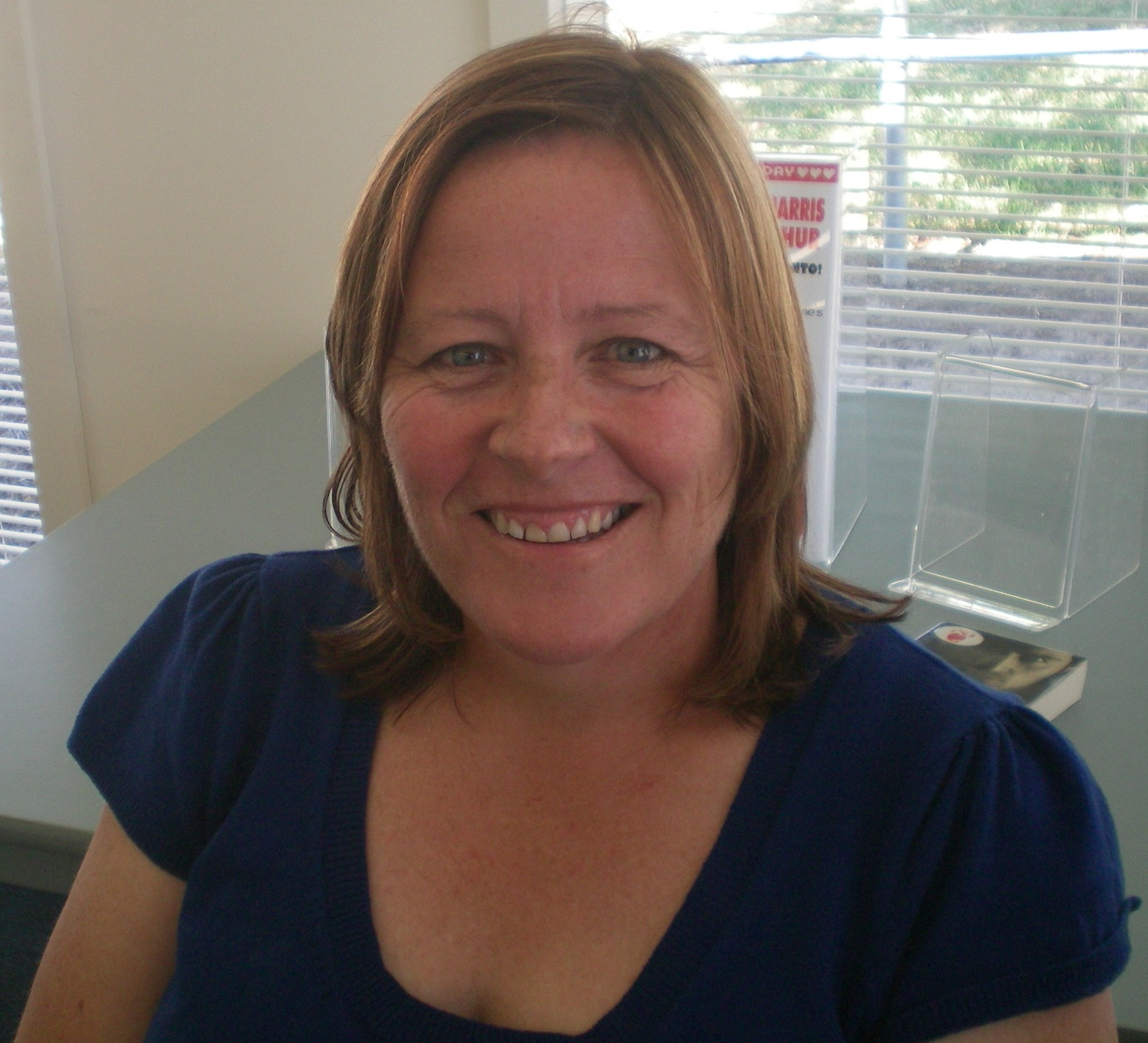
- Born: 4 December 1967 (age 58)
- Occupation: Author
- Writing career
- Genres: fantasy horror fiction romance novels

Keri Arthur (born 4 December 1967) is a writer of fantasy, horror fiction, and romance novels from Melbourne, Australia.

Her books have received many nominations and prizes, including nods from the Romantic Times Reviewers' Choice Awards and PNR's PEARL Awards. She is known mainly for her paranormal romance novels such as Full Moon Rising and Kissing Sin. She has one daughter.

Arthur is perhaps best known for a series of books revolving around the character Riley Jenson, a rare half-vampire, half-werewolf hybrid who works for an organisation in Melbourne called the Directorate of Other Races, which was created to police supernatural races.

== Bibliography ==
=== Stand Alone Novels and Novellas ===
- Lifemate Connections-Eryn (ImaJinn Books, March 2007) (Re-released as Lifemate Connections: A Shifter Romance an e-book)

=== Nikki and Michael ===
1. Dancing With the Devil (ImaJinn Books, Sept 2000; (UK) Piatkus, Nov 2008; (Reissue) Dell, July 2013)
2. Hearts in Darkness (ImaJinn Books, Sept 2000; (UK) Piatkus, Nov 2008; (Reissue) Dell, August 2013)
3. Chasing the Shadows (ImaJinn Books, Sept 2003; (UK) Piatkus, Dec 2008; (Reissue) Dell, September 2013 )
4. Kiss the Night Good-Bye (ImaJinn Books, Sept 2004; (UK) Piatkus, Dec 2008; (Reissue) Dell, October 2013)

=== Damask Circle ===
1. Circle of Fire (ImaJinn Books, Aug 2001; (UK) Piatkus, Aug 2009; (Reissue) Dell, January 2014)
2. Circle of Death (ImaJinn Books, Sept 2002; (UK) Piatkus, Sept 2009; (Reissue) Dell, February 2014)
3. Circle of Desire (ImaJinn Books, Sept 2004; (UK) Piatkus, Oct 2009; (Reissue) Dell, April 2014 )

=== Ripple Creek ===
1. Beneath a Rising Moon (ImaJinn Books, Sept 2003; (UK) Piatkus, Sept 2008; (Reissue) Dell, July 2012)
2. Beneath a Darkening Moon (ImaJinn Books, Dec 2004 (UK) Piatkus, Sept 2008; (Reissue) Dell Oct 2012)

=== Spook Squad ===
1. Memory Zero (ImaJinn Books, June 2004; (UK) Piatkus, 2004; (Reissue) Dell, August 26, 2014)
2. Generation 18 (ImaJinn Books, Sept 2004; (UK) Piatkus, 2009; (Reissue) Dell, September 30, 2014)
3. Penumbra (ImaJinn Books, Nov 2005; (UK) Piatkus, 2009; (Reissue) Dell, October 28, 2014)

=== Riley Jenson Guardian Series ===
A series of spicy urban fantasy novels that follow Riley Jenson, a vampire-werewolf hybrid who works at an organization that was created for the purpose of policing supernatural creatures. Much of the novels center around Riley's romantic and sexual encounters.

1. Full Moon Rising (Dell, Dec 2006; (UK) Piatkus, April 2007)
2. Kissing Sin (Dell, Jan 2007; (UK) Piatkus, April 2007)
3. Tempting Evil (Dell, Feb 2007; (UK) Piatkus, April 2007)
4. Dangerous Games (Dell, March 2007; (UK) Piatkus, April 2007)
5. Embraced by Darkness (Dell, July 2007; (UK) Piatkus, Aug 2007)
6. The Darkest Kiss (Dell, Apr 2008; (UK) Piatkus, May 2008)
7. Deadly Desire (Dell, March 2009; (UK) Piatkus, April 2009)
8. Bound to Shadows (Dell, Oct 2009; (UK) Piatkus, Nov 2009)
9. Moon Sworn (Dell, May 2010; (UK) Piatkus, May 2010)

=== Myth and Magic Series ===
1. Destiny Kills (Dell, Oct 2008; (UK) Piatkus, April 2011)
2. Mercy Burns (Dell, April 2011 (UK) Piatkus, April 2011)

=== Dark Angels ===
A series that follows Risa Jones, a half Aedh, half werewolf who was introduced in the Riley Jenson series.

1. Darkness Unbound (Dell, September 2011; (UK) Piatkus, September 2011)
2. Darkness Rising (Dell, October 2011; (UK) Piatkus, October 2011)
3. Darkness Devours (Signet Select, June 2012; (UK) Piatkus, June 2012)
4. Darkness Hunts (Signet Select, November 2012; (UK) Piatkus, November 2012)
5. Darkness Unmasked (Signet Select, June 2013; (UK) Piatkus, June 2013)
6. Darkness Splintered (Signet, November 2013; (UK) Piatkus, November 2013)
7. Darkness Falls (Signet, December 2014; (UK) Paitkus, December 2014)

=== Harri Phillecky, PI Series ===
A series about a part elf, part siren outcast that is a paranormal investigator.

1. Who Needs Enemies (IGLA, 2013)

=== Souls of Fire ===
Ember is a phoenix that can take human shape and foresee death.

1. Fireborn (Signet Select, July 2014)
2. Wicked Embers (Signet Select, July 2015)
3. Flameout (Signet Select, July 2016)
4. Ashes Reborn (Berkley, September 2017)

=== An Outcast Novel series ===
The series is about a veil that was torn between two worlds for 100 years, letting in demons from another dimension. People begin living in artificial cities in hopes of keeping the demons away.

1. City of Light (Signet Select, January 2016)
2. Winter Halo (Signet Select, December 2016)
3. The Black Tide (Self Published, 2017, (UK) Piatkus December 2017)

=== Lizzie Grace ===
Takes place in a world where magic and science coexist side by side and where witches are necessary aides for governments.

1. Blood Kissed (Self Published, May 2017)
2. Hell's Bell (Self Published, January 2018 (e-book) February 2018 (paperback))
3. Hunter Hunted (Self Published, August 2018)
4. Demon's Dance (Self Published, February 2019)
5. Wicked Wings (Self Published, October 2019)
6. Deadly Vows (Self Published, June 2020)
7. Magic Misled (Self Published, February 2021)
8. Broken Bonds (Self Published, Oct 26, 2021)
9. Sorrow's Song (Self Published, June 28, 2022)
10. Wraith's Revenge (Self Published, February 28, 2023)
11. Killer's Kiss (Self Published, October 24, 2023)

=== Kingdoms of Earth & Air ===
Takes place in a world where people are divided between magic and no magic but an ancient enemy, long thought to be dead, comes back.

1. Unlit (Self Published, May 2018)
2. Cursed (Self Published, November 2018)
3. Burn (Self Published, May 2019)

=== The Witch King's Crown ===
Series that is a spin on the King Arthur legends.

1. Blackbird Rising (Self Published, February 2020) – winner, Favourite Sci-Fi, Fantasy or Futuristic Romance at the 2020 Australian Romance Readers Awards
2. Blackbird Broken (Self Published, October 2020)
3. Blackbird Crowned (Self Published, June 22, 2021)

=== Relic Hunter ===
1. Crown of Shadows (Self Published, Coming Soon)

=== Anthologies and collections ===
Anthology or Collection	Contents	Publication Date	Publisher
Hotter Than Hell	To Die For	Jun 2008	Harper
The Mammoth Book of Vampire Romance	Dreams	Jul 2008	Running Press
Wolfsbane and Mistletoe	Christmas Past	Nov 2010	Ace
