= Sherri Browning Erwin =

American novelist (born 1968)

- Born: October 8, 1968 (age 57); Holyoke, Massachusetts, United States
- Education: Mount Holyoke College (BA)
- Occupation: Novelist
- Writing career
- Language: English
- Period: 1999–present
- Genres: Historical romance; Paranormal romance; Humor; Horror
- Notable works: Jane Slayre, Thornbrook Park series

Sherri Browning Erwin (born October 8, 1968) is an American novelist, best known for literary mash-ups, paranormal romance, and historical romance.

== Biography ==
Sherri Browning Erwin was born on October 8, 1968, in Holyoke, Massachusetts. She graduated from Mount Holyoke College in 1990 with a B.A. in English literature. In 1999, her first book, The Scoundrel's Vow, was published by Dell Books. She currently lives in Connecticut with her husband and two children.

In 2010, she released Jane Slayre, a mash-up parody of Charlotte Brontë's Jane Eyre which added vampires, werewolves, and other such supernatural elements to the original story. The book was released during the literary mash-up trend started by Seth Grahame-Smith's Pride and Prejudice and Zombies. Jane Slayre received a follow-up, Grave Expectations, a year later.

Erwin and authors Kathleen Givens and Julia London in 2004 founded the Whine Sisters, which was among the first group blogs alongside Squawk Radio.

In 2014, she began the Thornbrook Park series, a historical romance trilogy set in the post-Edwardian era. The final novel in the series, The Great Estate, was released in July 2015.

== Published works ==
=== Standalone novels ===
- The Scoundrel's Vow (1999, Dell), self-published ebook rerelease 2014
- Once Wicked (2000, Dell), self-published ebook rerelease 2014
- To Hell with Love (2007, Kensington)
- Naughty or Nice (2008, Kensington)
- Jane Slayre (2010, Gallery)
- Grave Expectations (2011, Gallery)

=== The Thornbrook Park series ===
- Thornbrook Park (2014, Sourcebooks)
- An Affair Downstairs (2015, Sourcebooks)
- The Great Estate (2015, Sourcebooks)

=== Anthology work ===
- "Fade to Black" in The Mammoth Book of Vampire Romance (2009, Running Press)
- "Mr. Sandman" in The Mammoth Book of Paranormal Romance 2 (2009, Running Press)
- Foreword in FEAR: A Modern Anthology of Horror and Terror Volume 2 (2012)
