= Vicki Pettersson =

American author (born 1972)

- Born: Vicki Pettersson; November 26, 1972 (age 53); Las Vegas, Nevada, U.S.
- Education: B.A. in English, 1994
- Alma mater: University of Nevada, Las Vegas
- Occupation: Writer
- Children: daughter; son
- Writing career
- Genre: Urban fantasy
- Notable works: Signs of the Zodiac novel series; "Celestial Blues' trilogy
- Website: vickipettersson.com

Vicki Pettersson (born November 26, 1972) is an American author known for her Signs of the Zodiac urban fantasy series and Celestial Blues trilogy, both set in modern-day Las Vegas. The Zodiac series follows casino heiress Joanna Archer, who discovers on her 25th birthday that she has superpowers. The Celestial Blues features a P.I. angel and a rockabilly reporter who join forces to fight crime in a noir/paranormal hybrid fiction. As of 2013, she is actively writing straight thrillers.

== Biography ==
Pettersson was born and raised in Las Vegas, Nevada and was a showgirl for "Les Folies Bergere" for 10 years at the Tropicana before giving up show business to be a mother and author.

Pettersson chose Las Vegas as the setting for her Zodiac series because she says, "it's the best possible place in the world for strange characters, and because I know it well."

== Bibliography ==
=== Novels ===
Sign of the Zodiac Series

- The Scent of Shadows: The First Sign of the Zodiac (March 2007, ISBN 978-0-06-089891-5)
- The Taste of Night: The Second Sign of the Zodiac (April 2007, ISBN 978-0-06-089892-2)
- The Touch of Twilight: The Third Sign of the Zodiac (May 2008, ISBN 978-0-06-089893-9)
- City of Souls: The Fourth Sign of the Zodiac (June 2009, ISBN 978-0-06-145678-7)
- Cheat the Grave: The Fifth Sign of the Zodiac (May 2010, ISBN 978-0-06-145677-0)
- Neon Graveyard: The Sixth Sign of the Zodiac (May 2011, ISBN 978-0-06-145679-4)

Celestial Blues Trilogy

- The Taken: Celestial Blues Book One (June 2012, ISBN 978-0-06-206464-6)
- The Lost: Celestial Blues Book Two (March 2013, ISBN 978-0-06-206465-3)
- The Given: Celestial Blues Book Three (May 2014, ISBN 978-0-06-206620-6)

=== Standalone novels ===
- Swerve: A Thriller (July 2015, ISBN 1476798575)

=== Anthologies and collections ===
Anthology or Collection	Contents	Publication Date	ISBN
Holidays Are Hell	The Harvest	Nov 2007	ISBN 978-0-06-123909-0
The Mammoth Book of Vampire Romance	Remember the Blood	Aug 2008	ISBN 978-0-7624-3498-5
Unbound	Dark Matters	Aug 2009	ISBN 978-0-06-169993-1
Dark and Stormy Knights	Shifting Star	Jul 2010	ISBN 978-0-312-59834-1
