= Cheyenne McCray =

American novelist

- Born: 1965 (age 59–60); Miami, Arizona, U.S.
- Occupation: Author
- Genre: Romance

Website
- cheyennemccray.com

Cheyenne McCray (born 1965 in Miami, Arizona, US) is an American author of romance novels, including paranormal romance, erotic romantic, romantic suspense, and urban fantasy. She has written multiple novels published by St. Martin’s Press and self-published e-books and paperbacks. Her work has also been featured in USA Today for her novels and in The New York Times bestselling anthologies.

== Bibliography ==
=== Published by St. Martin’s Press ===
==== Night Tracker novels ====
- Demons Not Included, 2009
- No Werewolves Allowed, 2010
- Vampires Not Invited, 2010
- Zombies Sold Separately, 2011
- Vampires Dead Ahead, 2011

==== Lexi Steele novels ====
- The First Sin, 2009
- The Second Betrayal, 2009
- The Temptation, 2012

==== Magic series ====
- Forbidden Magic, 2005
- Seduced by Magic, 2006
- Wicked Magic, 2007
- "Breath of Magic", 2007
- Shadow Magic, 2008
- Dark Magic, 2008

==== Romantic suspense ====
- Chosen Prey, 2007
- Moving Target, 2008

==== Armed & Dangerous ====
- Zack, 2008
- Luke, 2009
- Kade, 2010
- Clay, 2011

=== Self-published work ===
==== Lawmen series ====
- Hidden Prey, 2014
- No Mercy, 2015
- Slow Burn, 2015
- Point Blank, 2015

==== Riding Tall series ====
- Branded For You, 2012
- Roping Your Heart, 2012
- Fencing You In, 2012
- Tying You Down, 2013
- Playing With You, 2013
- Hot For You, 2013
- Crazy For You, 2013
- Made For You, 2013
- Held By You, 2014
- Belong To You, 2014

==== Rough & Ready series ====
- Lipstick & Leather, 2011
- Silk & Spurs, 2011
- Lace & Lassos, 2012
- Champagne & Chaps, 2012
- Satin & Saddles, 2012
- "Roses & Rodeo", 2012
- "Lingerie & Lariats", 2012
- "Country Thunder", 2020

==== Altered States ====
- Dark Seduction, 2012

=== Work in anthologies ===
- "Breath of Magic," No Rest for the Witches, St. Martin’s Press, 2007
- "Demon Lover," Hotter Than Hell, edited by Kim Harrison, Harper, 2008
- "The Edge of Sin," Real Men Last All Night, St. Martin’s Press, 2009
- "Succubus Seduction," Mammoth Book of Paranormal Romance, edited by Trisha Telep, Running Press, 2009
- "Dark Force," Mammoth Book of Special Ops Romance, edited by Trisha Telep, Running Press, 2010
- "Double Dead," Chicks Kick Butt, Tom Doherty Associates, 2011
- "Deadly Dance," Legally Hot, St. Martin’s Press, 2012
