= Jenna Black =

American writer

Jennifer Black
- Born: Ohio, U.S.
- Education: Duke University (BA)
- Occupation: Novelist
- Writing career
- Pen name: Jenna Black
- Period: 2001—present
- Genre: No binary
- Website: www.jennablack.com

Jennifer Black is an American author of paranormal romance novels, urban fantasy, and young adult fantasy novels. She began writing under the pen name Jenna Black in 2006. She published one novel earlier under her other name, Jennifer Barlow, and at least two short stories before that under her birth name. Jenna Glass is yet another pen name.

== Biography ==
Jenna Black was raised in Bratt, Florida. She got her BA in physical anthropology and French from Duke University and has remained in the Research Triangle area in the years since. She once aspired to be a primatologist, but ended up writing technical documentation. She attended the Clarion West Writers Workshop in 1989. Her first mass market paperback, Watchers in the Night (Tor Paranormal Romance), came out in 2006.

Black is represented by the Irene Goodman Literary Agency and is a member of the online writing blog, Deadline Dames.

== Bibliography ==
=== As Jennifer Barlow ===
- Hamlet Dreams (2001)

=== As Jenna Black ===
==== Free reads ====
- Embraced in Darkness (2005–06) (can be downloaded for free from her website )
- The Matchmaker’s Curse (can be downloaded for free if you become a member of her Free Reads Yahoo group)
- Remedial Magic (can be downloaded for free from her website)

==== Replica ====
1. Replica (2013)
2. Resistance (2014)
3. Revolution (2014)

==== Guardians of the Night ====
1. Watchers in the Night (2006)
2. Secrets in the Shadows (2007)
3. Shadows on the Soul (2007)
4. Hungers of the Heart (2008)

==== Morgan Kingsley ====
#	Title	Publication Date	Also In
1	The Devil Inside	2007	Morgan Kingsley Exorcist Morgan Kingsley Series Vol. 1-5
2	The Devil You Know	2008	Morgan Kingsley Exorcist Morgan Kingsley Series Vol. 1-5
3	The Devil's Due	2008	Morgan Kingsley Exorcist Morgan Kingsley Series Vol. 1-5
4	Speak of the Devil	2009	Morgan Kingsley Exorcist Morgan Kingsley Series Vol. 1-5
5	The Devil's Playground	2010	Morgan Kingsley Series Vol. 1-5
5.1	Nine-Tenths of the Law	2011	Chicks Kick Butt

==== Faeriewalker ====
#	Title	Publication Date
0.5	Remedial Magic	2010
1	Glimmerglass	2011
2	Shadowspell	2011
3	Sirensong	2011
3.5	Girls' Night Out	2012

==== Nikki Glass ====
#	Title	Publication Date	Publisher	ISBN	Comments
1	Dark Descendant	2011	Simon & Schuster	ISBN 978-1451606799	Cover Art: Nathália Suellen
2	Deadly Descendant	2012	Simon & Schuster	ISBN 9781451606805	
2.5	Pros and Cons	2013	Pocket Star	ISBN 1476700109, 9781476700106	
3	Rogue Descendant	2013	Pocket Books	ISBN 9781476700083	
4	Divine Descendant	2016	Pocket Star		e-book

==== Nightstruck ====
1. Nightstruck (2016)
2. Night Magic (2017)

==== Gifted ====
1. The Gifted Dead (2014)
2. Schism (2015)

=== As Jenna Glass ===
==== The Women's War ====
#	Title	Publication Date
0.5	A Sweet Bitter Poison	2020
1	The Women’s War	2019
2	Queen of the Unwanted	2020
3	Mother of All	2021

=== Anthologies and collections ===
Anthology or Collection	Contents	Publication Date
The Mammoth Book of Vampire Romance	Fangs For Hire	2008
Morgan Kingsley Exorcist	The Devil Inside The Devil You Know The Devil's Due Speak of the Devil	2010
Chicks Kick Butt	Nine-Tenths of the Law	2011
Morgan Kingsley Series Vol. 1-5	The Devil Inside The Devil You Know The Devil's Due Speak of the Devil The Devil's Playground	2012
Descendant: The Complete Nikki Glass Series	Dark Descendant Deadly Descendant Pros and Cons Rogue Descendant	2016
You Too?	?	2020
Del Rey's Next Reads Sampler 2020 Edition	?	2020
