= Susan Sizemore =

American novelist (1951–2020)

- Born: March 24, 1951; United States
- Died: July 21, 2020 (aged 69)
- Occupation: Novelist
- Writing career
- Genres: Romance; science fiction
- Website: Last archive of official website

Susan Sizemore (March 24, 1951 – July 21, 2020) was an American author of both romance and science fiction novels.

== Biography ==
Susan Sizemore began writing her own stories as a child. As an adult, she wrote fan fiction set in the Star Trek universe. She later began writing original romance novels. In 1991, when she was 40, she won the Romance Writers of America Golden Heart Award, presented to a previously unpublished author. Three days later, she sold her debut novel, a time-travel romance called Wings of the Storm. Within several years, she was able to begin writing full-time.

Later in her career, she was asked to write a media tie-in novel based on the television series Forever Knight. Her book, Forever Knight: A Stirring of Dust, marked the first time she had written about vampires. This endeavor inspired her to create her own original series about a vampire world. The resulting series, known as Laws of the Blood, is a fantasy series with some romantic elements. Sizemore later created a second vampire world. Books in the new series, Primes, are paranormal romances, focusing much more on the relationships than the fantasy world. Although both series focus on vampires, Sizemore has created distinct and separate universes. Her background in cultural anthropology has helped her to create unique cultures for her vampires. Sizemore gives her vampires modern human problems, as they struggle with relationships and raising children. Each novel also prominently features a human character, allowing the books to show several very different perspectives on the worlds.

Sizemore has been nominated for two Romantic Times awards.

Sizemore died on July 21, 2020, at the age of 69.

== Bibliography ==
=== Novels ===
- A Kind of Magic (2006)
- Dish of the Day (2010)
- A Little Death (2011)
- The Devil You Know (2011)
- Vampire Family Values (2012)
- That God Won't Hunt (2012)

==== Time travel romance ====
- Sammy's Song (2011) previously called In My Dreams (1994)
- My Own True Love (1994)
- The Autumn Lord (1996)
- One of These Nights (1997)
- Written in Ink (2010)
- Virgin of the Spring (2012)
- One Riot, One Ranger (2011)

==== Historical romance ====
- My First Duchess (1993)
- Nothing Else Matters (1995)
- The Price of Innocence (1999)
- The Price of Passion (2001)
- On A Long Ago Night (2000)

==== Contemporary romance ====
- Stranger by Her Side (1997)
- His Last Best Hope (2000)

==== Science fiction ====
- Forever Knight: A Stirring of the Dust (1997)
- Walking on the Moon (2005)
- Gates of Hell (2007)

=== Laws of the Blood ===
#	Title	Publication Date	Anthology
1	The Hunt	1999	
2	Partners	2000	
3	Companions	2001	
4	Deceptions	2002	
5	Heroes	2003	
5.5	Cave Canem	2008	First Blood
6	Personal Demon	2012	
7	Blood2Blood	2014	

=== Primes ===
#	Title	Publication Date	Anthology	Comments
0.5	Stealing Magic	2012		
1	I Burn For You	2003	Crave the Night	
2	I Thirst for You	2004	Crave the Night	
2.5	A Touch of Harry	2004	The Shadows of Christmas Past	
3	I Hunger for You	2005	Crave the Night	
4	Master of Darkness	2006		
5	Primal Heat	2006		
6	Primal Desires	2007		
6.5	Moon Fever	2007		
7	Primal Needs	2008		
8	Dark Stranger	2009		
8.5	By Sun and Candlelight	2012		
9	Primal Instincts	2010		
10	Primal Call	2011		
11	Primal Cravings	2012		
11.1	Children of the Night, You're Grounded	2014		
11.2	Fallen From the Stars	2017		with Sudsn Sizemore

=== Time Search ===
1. Wings of The Storm (1992)
2. After the Storm (1996)

=== Dr Cliff and Lord North ===
1. Memory of Morning (2011)
2. My Dearest (2012)

=== MacLeods of Skye Court ===
1. Too Wicked to Marry (2002)
2. Captured Innocence (2003)
3. Scandalous Miranda (2005)

=== Living Dead Girl ===
1. Black Snow (2012)
2. Bad Wolf (2013)
3. Caged Glass (2015)

=== Blue Death ===
1. Shattered Journey (2015)
2. Golden Lash (2015)
3. Blue Death (2015)

=== Children of the Rock ===
with Marguerite Krause

1. Moons' Dreaming (1999)
2. Moons' Dancing (2000)

=== Anthologies and collections ===
Anthology or Collection	Contents	Publication Date	Editor
Tall, Dark, and Dangerous	One Riot, One Ranger	1994	Catherine Anderson
A Dangerous Magic	A Little Death	1999	Denise Little
Guardian Angels : Heart-Warming Stories of Divine Influence and Protection	I'm Not Making This Up	2000	Martin H. Greenberg
Perchance to Dream	A Butterfly Dreaming	2000	Denise Little
Heaven and Hell	Rognarok Can Wait	2001	Winifred Halsey
Creature Fantastic	Coming to America	2001	Denise Little
Murder Most Romantic: Passionate Tales of Life and Death	Dizzy and the Biker	2001	Martin H. Greenberg
Familiars	Goodness Had Nothing to Do With It	2002	Denise Little
Pharaoh Fantastic	That God Won't Hunt	2002	Martin H. Greenberg
Vengeance Fantastic	Sometimes It's Sweet	2002	Denise Little
The Shadows of Christmas Past	A Touch of Harry	2004	Christine Feehan
The Magic Shop	Every Little Thing She Does	2004	Denise Little
Rotten Relations	Among the Stars	2004	Denise Little
Time After Time	Me, Myself, and Ay	2005	Denise Little
The Anthology at the End of the Universe Leading Science Fiction Authors on Douglas Adams' The Hitchhiker's Guide to the Galaxy	You Can't Go Home Again, Damn It! Even If Your Planet Hasn't Been Blown Up By The Vogons	2005	Glenn Yeffeth
Crave the Night	I Burn For You I Thirst for You I Hunger for You	2005	
You Bet Your Planet	Dish of the Day	2005	Martin H. Greenberg
The Mammoth Book of Vampire Romance	Dancing with the Star	2008	Trisha Telep
First Blood	Cave Canem	2008	Susan Sizemore
Living Dead Girl	Black Snow Bad Wolf Caged Glass	2017	
