= Karen Chance =

American writer

Karen Chance is an American novelist. She grew up in Orlando, Florida. She has lived in France, Great Britain, Hong Kong and New Orleans, where she has taught history. She is currently living in Florida. She has been a full time author since 2008.

Chance has had books on the New York Times and USA Today bestselling lists.

Chance's Cassandra Palmer series follows ghost whisperer/clairvoyant Cassie Palmer, as she learns what it is to be the Pythia, the chief seer of the supernatural world. As the series progresses, she explores her identity, her powers, and the supernatural community and her place in it.

The Midnight's Daughter series spins off from the Cassandra Palmer series. The main character, Dorina Basarab, is the dhampir (half human, half vampire) daughter of Mircea Basarab, one of the Pythia's supporters in the vampire community and a love interest for Cassandra. There are a few characters who appear in both series.

== Bibliography ==
=== The Cassandra Palmer series ===
1. Touch the Dark, June 2006, ISBN 0-451-46093-6
2. Claimed by Shadow, April 2007, ISBN 0-451-46152-5
3. Embrace the Night, April 2008, ISBN 0-451-46199-1
4. Curse the Dawn, April 2009, ISBN 0-451-41270-2
5. Hunt the Moon, June 2011, ISBN 0-451-41307-5
6. Tempt the Stars, October 2013, ISBN 0-451-41905-7
7. Reap the Wind, November 2015, ISBN 0-451-41907-3
8. Ride the Storm, August 2017, ISBN 1-101-98998-X
9. Brave the Tempest, July 2019, ISBN 1-101-99000-7
10. Shatter the Earth, February 2020 ISBN 1-734-53421-4
11. Ignite the Fire: Incendiary, September 2021 ISBN 1-734-53425-7
12. Ignite the Fire: Inferno, January 2022 ISBN 1-734-53428-1
13. Hijack the Seas: Seismic, August 2024 ISBN 979-8991452502
14. Hijack the Seas: Tsunami, May 2025 ISBN 979-8-9914525-4-0

==== Short stories, novellas, and side character novels ====
- The Mammoth Book of Vampire Romance, July 2008, ISBN 0-7624-3498-8.
  - The Day of the Dead
  - Features Tomas, from the Cassandra Palmer series.
- The Mammoth Book of Paranormal Romance 2, October 2010, ISBN 0-7624-3996-3.
  - The Gauntlet
  - Features Kit Marlowe, from the Cassandra Palmer series. Prequel to "the Queen's Witch".
- The Queen's Witch, May 2010, ISBN 9781458181947.
  - Features Kit Marlowe.
- A Family Affair, August 2011, ISBN 9781465716187.
  - Features John Pritkin, from the Cassandra Palmer series.
- Shadowland, November 2012, ISBN 9781301006861.
  - Features John Pritkin, from the Cassandra Palmer series.
- The House at Cobb End, November 2012, ISBN 9781301776573.
  - Features John Pritkin, from the Cassandra Palmer series.
- Masks, March 2014, ISBN 0-698-18293-6
  - a Mircea Basarab novel, prequel to the Cassandra Palmer series
- Siren's Song, July, 2019, ISBN 9781692861803.
  - A John Pritkin novel, from the Cassandra Palmer series.
- Junk Magic, October, 2022, ISBN 9798987169216.
  - A Lia de Croisset novel, Cassandra Palmer universe.

=== Dorina Basarab series ===
1. Midnight's Daughter, October 2008, ISBN 0-451-41262-1
2. Death's Mistress, January 2010, ISBN 0-451-41276-1
3. Fury's Kiss, October 2012, ISBN 0-451-41323-7
4. Shadow's Bane, July 2018, ISBN 0-451-41906-5
5. Queen's Gambit, May 2020, ISBN 1-734-53424-9
6. Time's Fool, March 2023, ISBN 979-8987169247
7. Fortune's Blade, January 2024, ISBN 979-8987169254

=== Lia De Croisset's series ===
1. Junk Magic, October 2022, ISBN 979-8987169216
2. Weird Magic, January 2026, ISBN 979-8994579411

==== Short stories and novellas ====
- Buying Trouble and also in On the Prowl, August 2007, ISBN 0-425-21659-4.
  - Buying Trouble
  - Features Claire Lachesis, from the Dorina Basarab series.
- Wolfsbane and Mistletoe, October 2008, ISBN 0-441-01633-2.
  - Rogue Elements
  - Features Lia De Croissets, the war mage.
- Strange Brew, July 2009, ISBN 0-312-38336-3.
  - Vegas Odds
  - Features Lia De Croissets.
- Inked, 2010, ISBN 0-425-23197-6.
  - Skin Deep
  - Features Lia De Croissets.
- Chicks Kick Butt, July 2011, ISBN 0-7653-2577-2.
  - In Vino Veritas
  - Features Dorina Basarab, shortly after Death's Mistress.
- Zombie's Bite, December 2015, ASIN: B018WS0CN6.
  - Features Dorina Basarab and Kit Marlowe, from the Midnight's Daughter series.
- Lover's Knot, June 2017, ASIN: B073G9QLMD.
  - Features Dorina Basarab and Kit Marlowe, from the Midnight's Daughter series.
- Dragon's Claw, September 2018, ASIN: B07H2B9NDB.
  - Features Dorina Basarab from the Midnight's Daughter series.
