= Jenna Maclaine =

American novelist

- Born: July 30, 1975 (age 50); U.S.
- Occupation: Novelist
- Education: North Georgia College & State University (BA)
- Genre: Romance

Website
- www.jennamaclaine.com

Jenna Maclaine (born July 30, 1975) is an American author specializing in paranormal romance. Mclaine has a BA in history from North Georgia College & State University. She lives on a farm with over 80 animals in the foothills of the Blue Ridge Mountains.

== Works ==
=== Cin Craven Series ===
- The Righteous in The Mammoth Book of Vampire Romance (July 2008)

1. The Wages of Sin (July 29, 2008)
2. Grave Sins (February 3, 2009)
  - Sin Slayer in Huntress (June 30, 2009)
  - Dark Sins in Strange Brew (July 7, 2009)
3. Bound by Sin (December 29, 2009)
  - The Eternal Warrior in The Mammoth Book of Irish Romance (January 26, 2010)

== Reviews ==
Romantic Times gave four-star reviews to both Wages of Sin and Grave Sins.
