= Kimberly Raye =

American author

- Occupation: Novelist
- Writing career
- Period: ? - present
- Genres: Paranormal romance, Erotica, Romance

Kimberly Raye is an American author who writes mostly Romance and Paranormal fiction. She is the creator of the Dead End Dating series as well as authored a variety of Harlequin Romance titles. She currently resides in Texas with her husband and children. She has also written under the alias, Kimberly Randell.

== Bibliography ==
=== Novels ===
- Til We Meet Again (1995)
- Only in My Dreams (1997)
- Gettin' Lucky (1998)
- Midnight Kisses (2000)
- The Pleasure Principle (2001)
- A Stranger's Kiss (2001)
- Fast Track (2008)
- Slippery When Wet (2008)

=== Inspiration, Texas ===
1. Breathless (1999)
2. Restless (2000)
3. Shameless (2000)

=== Farrel Sisters ===
1. Kiss Me Once, Kiss Me Twice (2004)
2. Sometimes Naughty, Sometimes Nice (2004)
3. Sweet as Sugar, Hot as Spice (2005)

=== Sex Solution ===
1. The Sex Solution (2004)
2. The Fantasy Factor (2004)

=== McGraw Triplets ===
1. Texas Fever (2005)
2. Texas Fire (2005)

=== Dead End Dating series ===
1. Dead End Dating, 2006
2. Dead and Dateless, 2007
3. Your Coffin or Mine?, 2007
4. Just One Bite, 2008
5. Sucker for Love, 2009
6. Here Comes the Vampire, 2013

=== Love at First Bite ===
#	Title	Anthology or Collection	Date Published	Comments
1	Dead Sexy		2007	
2	Drop Dead Gorgeous		2008	
3	A Body to Die For		2008	
3.5	Once Upon a Bite	Blazing Bedtime Stories	2010	
4	Cody		2009	
5	The Braddock Boys: Brent		2010	
6	The Braddock Boys: Travis		2011	
7	The Braddock Boys: Colton		2012	

=== Jess Damon ===
1. The Devil's in the Details (2013)

=== Texas Outlaws ===
1. Jesse (2013)
2. Billy (2014)
3. Cole (2014)

=== Tombstone, Texas ===
1. The Quick and the Undead (2014)

=== Rebel Moonshine ===
1. Texas Thunder (2015)
2. Red-Hot Texas Nights (2016)
3. Tempting Texas (2016)

=== Love Spell series ===
1. A Stranger's Spell, 2001
2. A Stranger's Desire, 2003
3. Faithless Stranger, 2008

=== Series Contributed To ===
- Dreamscapes : Whispers of Love
  - Now and Forever (1996) Book 27 of 27
- Angel's Touch
  - Faithless Angel (1998) Book 11 of 12
- Legendary Lovers
  - Something Wild (1998) Book 6 of 9
- Haunting Hearts
  - In the Midnight Hour (1999) Book 7 of 12 writing as Kimberly Randell
- Wink & a Kiss
  - Midnight Fantasies (2000) Book 8 of 9
- Trueblood Dynasty
  - Dylan's Destiny (2002) Book 21 of 22
- 24 Hours: Island Fling
  - Tall, Tanned and Texan (2006) Book 1 of 3

=== Anthologies and collections ===
Anthology or Collection	Contents	Publication Date	In Collaboration With	Comments
One in a Million / Love, Texas Style	Love, Texas Style	1999	Ruth Jean Dale	
How Sweet It Is / Second-Chance Groom	How Sweet It Is	1999	Eugenia Riley	
Fruitcakes and Other Leftovers / Christmas, Texas Style	Christmas Texas Style	1999	Lori Copeland	
New Year's Babies		1999	Jennifer Archer Eugenia Riley	
Sinful		2000	Suzanne Forster Lori Foster Maggie Shayne	Writing as Kimberly Randell
Daddy's Little Cowgirl	Gettin' Lucky	2001	Judith Bowen	
Midnight Fantasies	Show and Tell	2001	Stephanie Bond Vicki Lewis Thompson	
Burning Up: Tales of Erotic Romance	Burn, Inc.	2003	Nina Bangs Cheryl Holt Patricia Ryan	
Boys of Summer	The Sweet Spot	2006	Leslie Kelly Julie Elizabeth Leto	
24 Hours Bundle	Tall, Tanned & Texan	2006	Jo Leigh Cara Summers	
Tall, Tanned & Texan / When She Was Bad	Tall, Tanned & Texan	2006	Cara Summers	
A NASCAR Holiday	Ladies, Start Your Engines...	2006	Debra Webb Roxanne St. Claire	
One-Click Buy: November 2007 Harlequin Blaze	Dead Sexy	2007	Jamie Sobrato Tori Carrington Cindi Myers Rhonda Nelson Jill Monroe	
Tex Appeal	Real Good Man	2008	Alison Kent Cara Summers	
One-Click Buy: February Harlequin Blaze	Tex Appeal	2008	Alison Kent Cara Summers Isabel Sharpe Tori Carrington Jill Monroe Sarah Mayberry Kate Hoffmann	
The Mammoth Book of Vampire Romance	Love Bites	2008	Trisha Telep Karen Chance Lilith Saintcrow Colleen Gleason C.T. Adams and Cathy Clamp Savannah Russe Caitlín R. Kiernan Vicki Pettersson Jenna Black Shiloh Walker Rachel Vincent Rebecca York Jenna Maclaine Raven Hart Delilah Devlin Nancy Holder Alexis Morgan Cathy Clamp Keri Arthur Susan Sizemore Amanda Ashley Dina James Barbara Emrys Sherri Browning Erwin	
One-Click Buy: November Harlequin Blaze	A Body to Die for	2008	Dawn Atkins Stephanie Bond Lori Borrill Tori Carrington	
Best of Makeovers Bundle	Texas Fire	2008	Kate Hardy Heidi Betts Emilie Rose Sarah Mayberry Emily McKay	
One-Click Buy: February 2009 Harlequin Blaze	Blazing Bedtime Stories	2009	Leslie Kelly Rhonda Nelson Julie Leto Jade Lee Joanne Rock Karen Foley Nancy Warren	
Dead Sexy / Heated Rush	Dead Sexy	2009	Leslie Kelly	
Love at First Bite Bundle	Dead Sexy Drop Dead Gorgeous A Body to Die For Once Upon a Bite	2009		
One-Click Buy: October 2009 Harlequin Blaze	Cody	2009	Jacquie D'Alessandro Karen Anders Samantha Hunter Jennifer LaBrecque Stephanie Bond	
Drop Dead Gorgeous / Come Toy with Me	Drop Dead Gorgeous	2009	Cara Summers	
Body to Die For / Flashpoint	A Body to Die For	2009	Jill Shalvis	
Blazing Bedtime Stories	Once Upon a Bite	2009	Leslie Kelly Rhonda Nelson	
Cody / Below the Belt	Cody	2010	Sarah Mayberry	
Blazing Bedtime Stories, Volume IV	Cupid's Bite	2010	Samantha Hunter	
Blazing Bedtime Stories, Volume VIII	The Cowboy Who Never Grew Up	2012	Julie Leto	
Private Investigations / Breathless	Breathless	2011	Tori Carrington	
Unforgettable / Texas Outlaws: Jesse	Texas Outlaws: Jesse	2013	Samantha Hunter	
Harlequin Blaze January 2014 Bundle	Texas Outlaws: Jesse	2014	Samantha Hunter Serena Bell	
Harlequin Blaze March 2014 Bundle	Texas Outlaws: Cole	2014	Kira Sinclair Debbi Rawlins Samantha Hunter	
