= List of Harlequin Romance novels released in 1994 =

This is a list of Harlequin Romance novels released in 1994. (Main index: List of Harlequin Romance novels)

== Releases ==
Number	Title	Author	Date	Citations
# 3295	One Fateful Summer	Margaret Way	January 1994	
# 3296	The Tenderfoot	Patricia Knoll	January 1994	
# 3297	The Three Of Us	Samantha Day	January 1994	
# 3298	Out Of Nowhere	Patricia Wilson	January 1994	
# 3299	Two For The Heart: The Proposal	Betty Neels	January 1994	
# 3299	Two For The Heart: The Engagement	Ellen James	January 1994	
# 3300	A Singular Honeymoon	Leigh Michaels	February 1994	
# 3301	Once A Cowboy...	Day Leclaire	February 1994	
# 3302	The Beckoning Flame	Jessica Hart	February 1994	
# 3303	Baby Makes Three	Emma Goldrick	March 1994	
# 3304	I Will Find You!	Lisa Harris	March 1994	
# 3305	The Perfect Scoundrel	Virginia Hart	March 1994	
# 3306	Relative Attraction	Celia Scott	March 1994	
# 3307	Ready For Marriage	Debbie Macomber	April 1994	
# 3308	Relative Values	Jessica Steele	April 1994	
# 3309	Counterfeit Cowgirl	Heather Allison	April 1994	
# 3310	Lawful Possession	Catherine George	April 1994	
# 3311	Traveling Man	Leigh Michaels	May 1994	
# 3312	The Mermaid Wife	Rebecca Winters	May 1994	
# 3313	Wild Horses	Ruth Jean Dale	May 1994	
# 3314	One Shining Summer	Quinn Wilder	May 1994	
# 3315	A Girl In A Million	Betty Neels	June 1994	
# 3316	The Baby Battle	Shannon Waverly	June 1994	
# 3317	Dare To Kiss A Cowboy	Renee Roszel	June 1994	
# 3318	The Faberge Cat	Anne Weale	June 1994	
# 3319	Expectations	Shannon Waverly	July 1994	
# 3320	Island Child	Roz Denny	July 1994	
# 3321	Early Harvest	Amanda Clark	July 1994	
# 3322	The Truth About George	Peggy Nicholson	July 1994	
# 3323	At Odds With Love	Betty Neels	August 1994	
# 3324	Family Secrets	Leigh Michaels	August 1994	
# 3325	Bride Of My Heart	Rebecca Winters	August 1994	
# 3326	On Blueberry Hill	Marcella Thompson	August 1994	
# 3327	Italian Invader	Jessica Steele	September 1994	
# 3328	The Dinosaur Lady	Anne Marie Duquette	September 1994	
# 3329	The Confirmed Bachelor	Ellen James	September 1994	
# 3330	An Impossible Kind of Man	Kay Gregory	September 1994	
# 3331	The Carradine Brand	Margaret Way	October 1994	
# 3332	Cross Purposes	Kate Denton	October 1994	
# 3333	Sullivan's Law	Amanda Clark	October 1994	
# 3334	A Sensible Wife	Jessica Hart	October 1994	
# 3335	The Balleymore Bride	Emma Goldrick	November 1994	
# 3336	Some Like It Hotter	Roz Denny	November 1994	
# 3337	The Only Solution	Leigh Michaels	November 1994	
# 3338	Who's Holding The Baby?	Day Leclaire	November 1994	
# 3339	The Awakened Heart	Betty Neels	December 1994	
# 3340	The Nutcracker Prince	Rebecca Winters	December 1994	
# 3341	The Santa Sleuth	Heather Allison	December 1994	
# 3342	Gift-Wrapped	Victoria Gordon	December 1994	
