= List of Harlequin Romance novels released in 1991 =

This is a list of Harlequin Romance novels released in 1991. (Main index: List of Harlequin Romance novels)

== Releases ==
Number	Title	Author	Date	Citations
# 3097	Society Page	Ruth Jean Dale	January 1991	
# 3098	Love Thy Neighbour	Victoria Gordon	January 1991	
# 3099	A Second Loving	Claudia Jameson	January 1991	
# 3100	Burning Dreams	Peggy Nicholson	January 1991	
# 3101	A Woman's Place	Nicola West	January 1991	
# 3102	Bond Of Destiny	Patricia Wilson	January 1991	
# 3103	To Tame A Cowboy	Katherine Arthur	February 1991	
# 3104	City Girl, Country Girl	Amanda Clark	February 1991	
# 3105	The Girl With Green Eyes	Betty Neels	February 1991	
# 3106	Of Rascals And Rainbows	Marcella Thompson	February 1991	
# 3107	The Golden Thief	Kate Walker	February 1991	
# 3108	Thai Silk	Anne Weale	February 1991	
# 3109	Every Woman's Dream	Bethany Campbell	March 1991	
# 3110	Fair Trial	Elizabeth Duke	March 1991	
# 3111	The Girl He Left Behind	Emma Goldrick	March 1991	
# 3112	An Impossible Passion	Stephanie Howard	March 1991	
# 3113	First Comes Marriage	Debbie Macomber	March 1991	
# 3114	Hidden Heart	Jessica Steele	March 1991	
# 3115	Arrogant Invader	Jenny Arden	April 1991	
# 3116	Love's Awakening	Rachel Ford	April 1991	
# 3117	The Only Man	Rosemary Hammond	April 1991	
# 3118	Two Against Love	Ellen James	April 1991	
# 3119	An Uncommon Affair	Leigh Michaels	April 1991	
# 3120	Rites of Love	Rebecca Winters	April 1991	
# 3121	No Angel	Jeanne Allan	May 1991	
# 3122	Romantic Notions	Roz Denny	May 1991	
# 3123	Firm Commitment	Kate Denton	May 1991	
# 3124	Pretence of Love	Carol Gregor	May 1991	
# 3125	Lightning's Lady	Valerie Parv	May 1991	
# 3126	A First Time For Everything	Jessica Steele	May 1991	
# 3127	A Love to Last	Samantha Day	June 1991	
# 3128	The Jewels Of Helen	Jane Donnelly	June 1991	
# 3129	Arrogant Interloper	Catherine George	June 1991	
# 3130	Father's Day	Debbie Macomber	June 1991	
# 3131	A Suitable Match	Betty Neels	June 1991	
# 3132	Sea Fever	Anne Weale	June 1991	
# 3133	The Cloud Holders	Bethany Campbell	July 1991	
# 3134	Mississippi Miss	Emma Goldrick	July 1991	
# 3135	Love Or Money	Virginia Hart	July 1991	
# 3136	FALSE Impressions	Lucy Keane	July 1991	
# 3137	The Spice Of Love	Jessica Marchant	July 1991	
# 3138	Winter Roses	Catherine Spencer	July 1991	
# 3139	Where There's A Will	Day Leclaire	August 1991	
# 3140	Master of Marshlands	Miriam MacGregor	August 1991	
# 3141	Promise Me Tomorrow	Leigh Michaels	August 1991	
# 3142	Lovespell	Jennifer Taylor	August 1991	
# 3143	Summer's Pride	Angela Wells	August 1991	
# 3144	Blackie's Woman	Rebecca Winters	August 1991	
# 3145	Disastrous Encounter	Kerry Allyne	September 1991	
# 3146	Never Doubt My Love	Katherine Arthur	September 1991	
# 3147	A Civilised Arrangement	Catherine George	September 1991	
# 3148	Here Comes Trouble	Debbie Macomber	September 1991	
# 3149	Roses Have Thorns	Betty Neels	September 1991	
# 3150	No Trespassing	Shannon Waverly	September 1991	
# 3151	Adventure Of The Heart	Anne Marie Duquette	October 1991	
# 3152	Yesterday's Wedding	Kay Gregory	October 1991	
# 3153	Wicked Deceiver	Stephanie Howard	October 1991	
# 3154	Love's Harbor	Ellen James	October 1991	
# 3155	Trapped	Margaret Mayo	October 1991	
# 3156	Flight Of Discovery	Jessica Steele	October 1991	
# 3157	Pulse Points	Heather Allison	November 1991	
# 3158	A Vintage Affair	Elizabeth Barnes	November 1991	
# 3159	An Answer From The Heart	Claudia Jameson	November 1991	
# 3160	Temporary Measures	Leigh Michaels	November 1991	
# 3161	A Little Moonlight	Betty Neels	November 1991	
# 3162	Rescued Heart	Rebecca Winters	November 1991	
# 3163	Every Kind Of Heaven	Bethany Campbell	December 1991	
# 3164	A Touch Of Forgiveness	Emma Goldrick	December 1991	
# 3165	Two Different Worlds	Rosemary Hammond	December 1991	
# 3166	The Forgetful Bride	Debbie Macomber	December 1991	
# 3167	Endless Summer	Angela Wells	December 1991	
# 3168	Last Goodbye	Nicola West	December 1991	
