= Kate Hoffmann =

American novelist

Peggy Hoffmann
- Born: Unknown; United States
- Occupation: Novelist
- Writing career
- Pen name: Kate Hoffmann
- Period: 1993–present
- Genre: Romance

Peggy Hoffmann is an American writer of over 70 romance novels since 1993 as Kate Hoffmann. She has written for both the Temptation and Blaze lines for Harlequin Books. In 1992 she won the Harlequin Temptation contest. She lives in southeastern Wisconsin.

== Biography ==
Hoffmann majored in music in college, later she settled into a job teaching music to elementary school children. After she left teaching, she had jobs in fashion merchandising, advertising, public relations and marketing/communications on both the agency and corporate side. She began reading romantic novels in 1979, when she picked up a copy of Ashes in the Wind by Kathleen E. Woodiwiss, after which she immediately read all by Kathleen E. Woodiwiss, Rosemary Rogers, Laurie McBain, Valerie Sherwood, Johanna Lindsey and Jennifer Blake.

She attempted writing historical novels but eventually turned to contemporary novels instead. Her first contemporary novel was published in 1993 under the pseudonym "Kate Hoffmann."

== Bibliography ==
=== Standalone novels ===
- Indecent Exposure (1993)
- Wanted: Wife (1993)
- Love Potion No 9 (1994)
- Lady of the Night (1994)
- Never Love a Cowboy (1995)
- Wicked Ways (1996)
- The Honeymoon Deal (1997)
- All Through the Night (2000)
- Mr. Right Now (2001)
- Unexpected Angel (2002)
- Legally Mine (2004)
- Ring of Deception (2004)
- Hot & Bothered (2004)
- Warm & Willing (2004)
- Incognito (2008)
- Her Irish Rogue (2008)
- Into The Night (2011)
- Sweet Revenge? (2011)
- Off Limits Marine (2017)

=== Series ===
==== Men of Bachelor Creek! Series ====
1. Caught Under the Mistletoe! (1998)
2. Dodging Cupid's Arrow! (1998)
3. Struck by Spring Fever! (1998)

==== Millennium 2000's Heroes Series ====
1. Once a Hero (1999)
2. Always a Hero (1999)

==== Smooth Operators Series ====
1. The Charmer (2010)
2. The Drifter (2010)
3. The Sexy Devil (2010)

==== Heat Series ====
1. Hot and Bothered (2004)
2. Warm and Willing (2005)

=== Mighty Quinns Series ===
#	Title	Also In	Publication Date
1	Conor	Irish Charmers	2001
2	Dylan	Irish Charmers	2001
3	Brendan		2001
4	Reunited		2002
5	Liam		2003
6	Brian		2003
7	Sean		2003
8	The Promise		2005
9	Marcus	The Mighty Quinns: Marcus, Ian & Declan	2006
10	Ian	The Mighty Quinns: Marcus, Ian & Declan	2006
11	Declan	The Mighty Quinns: Marcus, Ian & Declan	2006
12	The Legacy		2007
13	Brody	Mighty Quinns: Brody / Twin Temptation / Letters from Home Australian Quinns	2009
13.1	Twin Temptation	Mighty Quinns: Brody / Twin Temptation / Letters from Home	2009
13.2	Letters from Home	Mighty Quinns: Brody / Twin Temptation / Letters from Home	2009
14	Teague	Australian Quinns One-Click Buy: July 2009 Harlequin Blaze	2009
15	Callum	Australian Quinns	2009
16	Riley		2011
17	Danny		2011
18	Kellan		2011
19	Dermot	The Mighty Quinns: Dermot-Dex	2012
20	Kieran	The Mighty Quinns: Dermot-Dex	2012
21	Cameron	The Mighty Quinns: Dermot-Dex	2012
22	Ronan	The Mighty Quinns: Dermot-Dex	2012
23	Logan	The Mighty Quinns: Dermot-Dex	2013
24	Jack	The Mighty Quinns: Dermot-Dex	2013
25	Rourke	The Mighty Quinns: Dermot-Dex	2013
25.1	A Mighty Quinn Seduction		2013
26	Dex	The Mighty Quinns: Dermot-Dex	2013
27	Malcolm		2014
28	Rogan		2014
29	Ryan		2014
30	Eli		2015
31	Devin		2015
32	Mac		2015
33	Thom		2016
34	Tristan		2016
35	Jamie		2017

=== Multi-Author Series ===
==== Secret Fantasies Series Multi-Author ====
- 7. Never Love a Cowboy (1995)

==== Bachelors Arms Series ====
1. Bachelor Husband (1995)
2. The Strong Silent Type (1995)
3. A Happily Unmarried Man (1996)

==== For Her Eyes Only Series Multi Author ====
- 3. The Pirate (1996)
- 10. A Body to Die For (1998)

==== Hero for Hire Series ====
- 3. A Body to Die for (1998)

==== Weddings By Dewilde Series Multi-Author ====
- 3. Dressed To Thrill (1996)
- 8.Terms of Surrender (1996)

==== Wrong Bed Series Multi-Author ====
- 10. Not in My Bed! (1999)
- 46. Your Bed Or Mine? (2008)
- 58. Not Just Friends (2012)
- 66. Compromising Positions (2016)

==== Personal Touch Series Multi-Author ====
- 4. Mr. Right Now (2001)

==== Trueblood Dynasty Series Multi-Author ====
- 8. Daddy Wanted (2001)

==== Cooper's Corner Series Multi-Author ====
- 14. My Christmas Cowboy (2002)

==== Forrester Square Series Multi-Author ====
- 3. All She Needed (2003)

==== Million Dollar Secret Series Multi-Author ====
- 4. For Lust or Money (2007)

==== Lust in Translation Series Multi-Author ====
- 2. Doing Ireland! (2007)

==== Forbidden Fantasies Series Multi-Author ====
- 9. Incognito (2008)
- 24. Into the Night (2010)

==== 24 Hours: Lost Series Multi-Author ====
- 1. Who Needs Mistletoe? (2008)

==== Uniformly Hot! Series Multi-Author ====
- 57. Seducing the Marine (2014)

=== Anthologies and collections ===
Anthology or Collection	Contents	Publication Date	In Collaboration With
Valentine Delights	His Secret Valentine	1997	Meryl Sawyer Gina Wilkins
Bridal Showers	She's the One!	Feb 1998	Ruth Jean Dale Jule McBride
Three Babies and a Bargain / Baby Bonus?	Three Babies and a Bargain	Jun 2000	Sandra Paul
Strangers in Paradise	Not in my Bed! With a Stetson and a Smile	Jun 2000	
Unexpected Angel / Undercover Elf	Unexpected Angel Undercover Elf	Dec 2000	
Written in the Stars	Someone in a Hat May Bring You Luck . . .	Nov 2001	Judith Arnold Gina Wilkins
Trueblood Christmas	Georgiana	Oct 2002	Jasmine Cresswell Tara Taylor Quinn
The Mother's Day Collection		Feb 2002	Helen Dickson Margaret Way
Terms of Engagement	Wanted: Wife	Feb 2002	Miranda Lee
Cinderfella / Lady of the Night	Lady of the Night	Oct 2002	Susan Wiggs
Where the Nights Are Long	Dodging Cupid's Arrow	Jan 2003	Bobby Hutchinson
Paris or Bust!	Romancing Roxanne	Mar 2003	Jacqueline Diamond Jill Shalvis
Five Times Trouble	Three Babies and a Bargain	Dec 2004	Susan Kearney
The Midnight Hour	Fiancé by Mistake	Jan 2004	Lilian Darcy Kate Walker
Legally Mine / Are You Lonesome Tonight?	Are You Lonesome Tonight?	Jan 2004	Wendy Etherington
Hot and Bothered / Underneath It All	Hot and Bothered	Oct 2004	Nancy Warren
Irish Charmers	Conor Dylan	Jan 2005	
Warm and Willing / Little Night Magic	Warm & Willing	Feb 2005	Liz Jarrett
Never Naughty Enough / Warm and Willing	Warm & Willing	Nov 2005	Jill Munroe
Sinfully Sweet	Simply Scrumptious	Jan 2006	Jacquie D'Alessandro Janelle Denison
A Fare to Remember	Taken for a Ride	Jun 2006	Julie Elizabeth Leto Vicki Lewis Thompson
Snowstorm Heat Bundle	Your Bed or Mine?	Feb 2008	Catherine Mann Susan Wiggs
One-Click Buy: July 2009 Harlequin Blaze	Teague	Jul 2009	Julie Kenner Karen Anders Jill Munroe Samantha Hunter Betina M. Krahn Cara Summers Rhonda Nelson
Mighty Quinns: Brody / Twin Temptation / Letters from Home	Brody Twin Temptation Letters from Home	Aug 2009	
The Mighty Quinns: Marcus, Ian & Declan	Marcus Ian Declan	Jun 2011	
Australian Quinns	Brody Teague Callum	Feb 2014	
The Mighty Quinns: Dermot-Dex	Dermot Kieran Cameron Ronan Logan Jack Rourke Dex	May 2014	

== References and resources ==
- Kate Hoffmann at eHarlequin
