= Julie Elizabeth Leto =

American novelist

- Born: Florida, United States
- Occupation: Novelist
- Language: English
- Genre: Romance novel, adventure fiction

Julie Elizabeth Leto is an American author of over forty romance novels.

Leto's action-adventure novels are sold under the name Julie Leto, as will all future books by the author, who officially dropped her middle name in September 2007.

== Biography ==
Julie Leto was born and raised in Florida to a family of Italian and Cuban descent. After picking up her first romance when she was only sixteen, Leto knew that she wanted to write one of her own. She earned degrees in Creative Writing and Speech Communications from the University of South Florida. She began writing in 1988, while she was in graduate school. After graduation she became an English teacher at Tampa Catholic High School and continued to write on weekends and at night. In 1996, in order to give herself more time to write, Leto quit her teaching job and joined her family's manufacturing business. The following year she sold her fourth completed novel, Seducing Sullivan to Harlequin Temptation. Shortly thereafter, she gave birth to a daughter and chose to be a full-time writer and mother.

Leto was a launch author for the new Harlequin Blaze line, and is the longest continuous member of the Tampa Area Romance Authors organization. Leto has written for Harlequin, Simon & Schuster and Penguin Books. Leto lives in Tampa, Florida.

== Bibliography ==
=== Action-Adventure ===
- Dirty Little Secrets (2005)
- Dirty Little Lies (2006)
- Dare Me (2011, originally published as "Dare to Desire" in Dare Me anthology by NAL/Signet 2005)
- Dirty Little Christmas (2012)
- Dirty Dare (2013)

=== Paranormal Romance ===
- Stripped (2007)
- Phantom Pleasures (2008)
- Phantom's Touch (2008)
- Something Wicked (2009)
- Kiss of the Phantom (2009)
- Phantom Promise (2014)

=== Romance Novels ===
- Seducing Sullivan (1998)
- Private Lessons (1999)
- Good Girls Do! (2000)
- Pure Chance (2001)
- Insatiable (2001)
- Exposed (2001)
- What's Your Pleasure? (2002)
- Just Watch Me. . . (2002)
- Double the Pleasure (2002)
- Brazen and Burning (2003)
- Looking for Trouble (2003)
- Up to No Good (2003)
- Line of Fire (2004)
- Undeniable (2004)
- Making Waves (2005)
- The Domino Effect (2006)
- 3 Seductions and a Wedding (2010)
- Hard to Hold (2010)
- Too Hot to Touch (2011)
- Too Wild to Hold (2011)
- Too Wicked to Keep (2011)

=== Omnibus ===
- Impetuous (1996) (with Lori Foster)
- Lip Service (2004) (with Lori Foster)
- Essence of Midnight (2004) (with Susan Kearney, Julie Kenner)
- Dare Me (2005) (with Cherry Adair and Jill Shalvis)
- Getting Real (2005) (with Jennifer LaBrecque and Vicki Lewis Thompson)
- A Fare to Remember: Just Whistle / Driven to Distraction / Taken for a Ride (2006) (with Kate Hoffmann and Vicki Lewis Thompson)
- Boys of Summer: Fever Pitch / The Sweet Spot / Sliding Home (2006) (with Leslie Kelly and Kimberly Raye)
- I'll Be Home for Christmas (2006) (with Linda Lael Miller, Catherine Mulvany and Roxanne St. Claire)
- Witchy Business (2007) (with Rhonda Nelson and Mia Zachary)
- More Blazing Bedtime Stories (2009) (with Leslie Kelly)
- The Guy Most Likely To... (2012) (with Leslie Kelly and Janelle Denison)
- Blazing Bedtime Stories, Volume VIII (2012) (with Kimberly Raye)

=== Online Reads ===
- One Wicked Weekend eHarlequin.com weekly read
- Rock and Rolling eHarlequin.com weekly read
- Bound and Determined eHarlequin.com round robin
- Surprise Wedding eHarlequin daily read

=== Collections ===
- More Than Words, Volume 2: What Amanda Wants / The Yellow Ribbon / The Way Home / Shelter from the Storm / Into the Groove (2005) (with Beverly Barton, Jasmine Cresswell, Debbie Macomber and Sharon Sala)

=== Reprints ===
- Good Girls Do! (2004, originally published in 2000)
- New Orleans Nights: Pure Chance / Insatiable (2006, originally published in 2001)
- Seducing Sullivan (2006, originally published in 1998)
- Private Lessons (2007, originally published in 1999)
- Exposed (free with Too Hot to Touch, 2011, originally published in 2001)

=== Digital-Only Re-releases ===
- Dare Me (2011, originally published as "Dare to Desire" in Dare Me anthology by NAL/Signet 2005)
- Dirty Little Secrets (2011, originally published by Pocket/Downtown Press 2005)
- Dirty Little Lies (2011, originally published by Pocket 2006)
- Phantom Pleasures (2011, originally published by Penguin/Signet 2008)
- Phantom's Touch (2011, originally published by Penguin/Signet 2008)
- Kiss of the Phantom (2011, originally published by Penguin/Signet 2009)
- KICK ASS: Boxed Set (2012, reprint of Dirty Little Secrets, Kiss of the Phantom & Dare Me)
- PHANTOM SERIES: Boxed Set (2012, all three Phantom novels, packaged together)

=== Digital-Only Original Release ===
- How You Remind Me ("A Girl Most Likely To", short story)
- Dirty Little Christmas (2012)
- Dirty Dare (2013)
- Phantom Promise (2014)
- Talk Dirty to Me (TBD)
