= Susan Donovan =

American novelist

Susan Donovan is an American author of romance novels and women's fiction. Her novel Take a Chance on Me won the 2003 Best Contemporary Romance Award Winner from Romantic Times. Two of her novels – The Kept Woman and Not That Kind of Girl were selected as RITA Award Finalists by the Romance Writers of America. Before writing her novels, she was a journalist, and studied at Northwestern University's Medill School of Journalism. She lives in New Mexico with her family and labradoodle.

== Bibliography ==
=== Novels ===
- He Loves Lucy (St. Martin's Press, Dec 2002)
- Knock Me Off My Feet (St. Martin's Press, Dec 2002)
- Take a Chance on Me (St. Martin's Press, Aug 2003)
- Public Displays of Affection (St. Martin's Press, Jun 2004)
- The Kept Woman (St. Martin's Press, Jun 2006)
- The Girl Most Likely To... (St. Martin's Press, Dec 2008)
- Unbound with Celeste Bradley (St. Martin's Press, 2012)
  - Previously published as A Courtesan's Guide to Getting Your Man (St. Martin's Press, May 2011)
- Chestnuts Roasting (Kindle, Oct 2016, novella)
  - Previously published as Turning Up the Heat in Jingle Bell Rock

=== San Francisco Dog-Walking Group Series ===
1. Ain't Too Proud to Beg (St. Martin's Press, Nov 2009)
2. The Night She Got Lucky (St. Martin's Press, May 2010)
3. Not That Kind of Girl (St. Martin's Press, Nov 2010)

=== Bigler, North Carolina Series ===
1. Cheri on Top (St. Martin's Press, Aug 2011)
2. I Want Candy (St. Martin's Press, Feb 2012)
3. Stealing Taffy (St. Martin's Press, Aug 2016) ISBN 978-1-250-00805-3

=== Bayberry Island Series ===
#	Title	Date Published	Publisher
0.5	A Seaside Christmas	Nov 2013	InterMix
1	Sea of Love	Dec 2013	Penguin Group
2	The Sweetest Summer	Aug 2014	Penguin Group
3	Moondance Beach	Sep 2015	Penguin Group
3.5	A Bayberry Christmas	Oct 2016	Kindle

=== Contributions to Series by Multiple Authors ===
==== 12 Days of Christmas ====
#1 A Partridge in the Au Pair's Tree (Amazon Story Front, Dec 2013)

=== Anthologies and Collections ===
Anthology or Collection	Contents	Publication Date	Publisher	With	Comments
Jingle Bell Rock	Turning Up the Heat	Oct 2003	Kensington	Lori Foster Donna Kauffman Janelle Denison	
Honk If You Love Real Men: Four Tales of Erotic Romance	Mercy Me	Jun 2005	St. Martin's Press	Carrie Alexander Pamela Britton Lora Leigh	
Real Men Do It Better	Bed and Breakfast	Feb 2007	St. Martin's Press	Carrie Alexander Lora Leigh Lori Wilde	
The Kept Woman / He Loves Lucy	The Kept Woman He Loves Lucy	2008	Headline Publishing Group		
The Guy Next Door	Gail's Gone Wild	Feb 2011	Harlequin	Lori Foster Victoria Dahl	
A Night to Remember	Have Mercy	Apr 2011	St. Martin's Press	Celeste Bradley	was Mercy Me
Christmas On Main Street	A Seaside Christmas	Nov 2013	Penguin Group	Joann Ross Luann McLane Alexis Morgan	
The Susan Donovan Collection	The Kept Woman Knock Me Off My Feet He Loves Lucy	Dec 2015	St. Martin's Press		
The Dogwalker Trilogy	Not That Kind of Girl The Night She Got Lucky Aint Too Proud to Beg	Dec 2015	St. Martin's Press		
Heart’s Kiss: Issue 12 December 2018-January 2019	A Partridge in the Au Pair's Tree	Nov 2018	Heart's Nest Press	Christine Feehan Debra Jess Gracie Wilson Anthea Lawson	

=== Writing as Pebbles Rocksoff ===
==== Short stories ====
- The Bodice Raptor, Amazon Digital Services, 2013
- Rex and the Single Girl, Amazon Digital Services, 2013
