= Vicki Lewis Thompson =

American writer

- Born: October 11, 1950 (age 75); United States
- Education: University of Arizona (BA, MA)
- Occupation: Novelist
- Writing career
- Pen name: Cory Kenyon (with Mary Tate Engels); Corey Keaton (with Mary Tate Engels)
- Period: 1984–present
- Genre: Romantic novel
- Website: vickilewisthompson.com

Vicki Lewis Thompson (born 11 October 1950 in United States) is an American writer of over seventy romance novels. She has also been published under the pseudonyms Cory Kenyon and Corey Keaton with Mary Tate Engels.

== Biography ==
Vicki Lewis was born on 11 October 1950 in the United States. She has both a B.A. and M.A. in English from the University of Arizona. She worked as a journalist and a high school English teacher before deciding that she would try to write romance novels. Her first book was published in 1984 as the ninth entry in the Harlequin Temptation line. The first of her "Nerd" Books, Nerd in Shining Armor, was a 2003 Reading With Ripa selection.

Lewis has two children.

== Awards ==
- 1985 - Romance Writers of America RITA Finalist, Promise Me Sunshine
- 1986 - Romance Writers of America RITA Finalist, When Angels Dance
- 1987 - Romance Writers of America RITA Finalist, Butterflies in the Sun
- 1990 - Romance Writers of America RITA Finalist, Be Mine, Valentine
- 1992 - Romance Writers of America RITA Finalist, It Happened One Weekend
- 1996 - Romantic Times Magazine's Reviewers Choice Award Winner, Holding Out for a Hero
- 1998 - Romance Writers of America RITA Finalist, Mr. Valentine
- 1999 - Romantic Times Magazine's Reviewers Choice Award Winner, Pure Temptation
- 2000 - Heart and Scroll Romance Writers of America Madcap Award Winner, Bringing Up Baby New Year
- 2000 - Romance Writers of America RITA Finalist, Pure Temptation
- 2002 - Romance Writers of America RITA Finalist, Notorious
- 2003 - Romantic Times Magazine's Reviewers Choice Award Winner, After Hours
- 2004 - Heart and Scroll Romance Writers of America Madcap Award Winner, Nerd in Shining Armor
- 2005 - Heart and Scroll Romance Writers of America Madcap Award Winner, The Nerd Who Loved Me

== Bibliography ==
=== Single Novels ===
- Mingled Hearts (1984)
- Promise Me Sunshine (1984)
- Impractical Passion (1985)
- As Time Goes by (1986)
- When Angels Dance (1986)
- Butterflies in the Sun (1986)
- The Fix It Man (1986)
- Cupid's Caper (1987)
- Golden Girl (1987)
- Sparks (1988)
- The Flip Side (1988)
- Impulse (1988)
- Full Coverage (1989)
- 'Tis the Season (1989)
- Connections (1989)
- Your Place or Mine (1991)
- It Happened One Weekend (1991)
- Anything Goes (1992)
- Critical Moves (1992)
- Ask Dr. Kate (1992)
- Fools Rush in (1993)
- Only in the Moonlight (1993)
- The Bounty Hunter (1994)
- Loverboy (1994)
- Under His Spell (1994)
- Wedding Song (1994)
- Adam Then and Now (1995)
- Holding Out for a Hero (1996)
- Hero in Disguise (1996)
- Stuck With You (1996)
- Mr. Valentine (1997)
- The Heart Breaker (1997)
- Going Overboard (1997)
- Santa in Stetson (1997)
- One Mom Too Many (1997)
- Manhunting in Montana (1998)
- Operation Gigolo (1998)
- Single in the Saddle (1998)
- Pure Temptation (1999)
- Single, Sexy... and Sold! (1999)
- Bachelor Father (1999)
- Every Woman's Fantasy (2001)
- Boone's Bounty (2001)
- The Nights Before Christmas (2001)
- Acting on Impulse (2002)
- Truly, Madly, Deeply (2002)
- Double Exposure (2002)
- After Hours (2003)
- Her Best Friend's Baby (2003)
- Old Enough to Know Better (2004)
- Killer Cowboy Charm (2004)
- Talking about Sex... (2005)

=== Nerds ===
1. Nerd in Shining Armor (2003)
2. The Nerd Who Loved Me (2004)
3. Nerd Gone Wild (2005)
4. Gone With the Nerd (2005)
5. Talk Nerdy to Me (2006)
6. Nerds Like It Hot (2006)
7. My Nerdy Valentine (2007)
8. Nerds Are From Mars (2013)

=== Wild About You ===
#	Title	Date Published
1	Werewolf in Manhattan	2011
1.5	Werewolf in Greenwich Village	2011
2	Werewolf in the North Woods	2011
3	Werewolf in Seattle	2012
4	Werewolf in Denver	2012
5	Werewolf in Alaska	2013
6	Werewolf in Las Vegas	2014

=== Sons of Chance ===
#	Title	Date Published	Also In
0.5	A Calculated Risk	2010	Racing Hearts
1	What a Cowboy Wants	2010	Sons Of Chance
2	A Cowboy's Temptation	2010	Sons Of Chance
3	Claimed by the Cowboy	2010	Sons Of Chance
4	Should’ve Been a Cowboy	2011	Should've Been a Cowboy & Cowboy Up
5	Cowboy Up	2011	Should've Been a Cowboy & Cowboy Up
6	Cowboys Like Us	2011	
6.1	It's Christmas, Cowboy!	2011	Merry Christmas, Baby
6.2	It's About Time, Cowboy	2012	
7	Count on a Cowboy	2012	
8	The Way to a Cowboy's Heart	2012	
9	Trust in a Cowboy	2012	
10	Only a Cowboy Will Do	2013	
11	Wild About the Cowboy	2013	
12	Cowboys and Angels	2013	
13	A Last Chance Christmas	Nov 2014	

=== Sons of Chance Collection: An Anthology ===
#	Title	Date Published
1	Riding High	2014
2	Riding Hard	2014
3	Riding Home	2014

=== Babes on Brooms ===
1. Blonde with a Wand (2010)
2. Chick with a Charm (2010)

=== Hex ===
1. Over Hexed (2007)
2. Wild and Hexy (2008)
3. Casual Hex (2009)

=== Rowdy Ranch ===
#	Title	Date Published
1	Having the Cowboy’s Baby	
2	Stoking the Cowboy’s Fire	
3	Testing the Cowboy’s Resolve	
4	Rocking the Cowboy’s Christmas	
5	Roping the Cowboy’s Heart	
6	Tempting the Cowboy’s Sister	
7	Craving the Cowboy’s Kiss	
8	Heating Up the Cowboy’s Christmas	
9	Blowing the Cowboy’s Mind	
10	Finding the Cowboy’s Family	

=== Thunder Mountain Brotherhood ===
1. Midnight Thunder (2015)
2. Thunderstruck (2015)
3. Rolling Like Thunder (2015)
4. A Cowboy Under the Mistletoe (2015)
5. Cowboy All Night (2016)
6. Cowboy After Dark (2016)
7. Cowboy Untamed (2016)
8. Cowboy Unwrapped (2016)
9. In the Cowboys Arms (2017)
10. Say Yes to the Cowboy (2017)
11. Do You Take This Cowboy? (2017)

=== Branscom Sisters ===
#	Title	Date Published	Also In
1	Mystery lover	2001	Midnight Fantasies
2	Notorious	2001	

=== The Buckskin Brotherhood ===
1. Sweet-Talking Cowboy (2020)
2. Big-Hearted Cowboy (2020)
3. Baby-Daddy Cowboy (2020)
4. True-Blue Cowboy (2020)
5. Strong-Willed Cowboy (2020)
6. Secret-Santa Cowboy (2020)
7. Stand-Up Cowboy
8. Single-Dad Cowboy
9. Marriage-Minded Cowboy
10. Gift-Giving Cowboy

=== Three Cowboys And a Baby ===
1. The Colorado Kid (2000)
2. Two in the Saddle (2000)
3. Boone's Bounty (2000)
4. That's My Baby! (2000)

=== Sexy Texans ===
1. Crazy for the Cowboy (2015)
2. Wild About the Wrangler (2015)

=== Urban Cowboy Series ===
1. The Trailblazer (1995)
2. The Drifter (1995)
3. The Lawman (1995)

=== Charlie Hartmann Valentine ===
1. Be Mine, Valentine (1989)
2. Forever Mine, Valentine (1990)

=== McGavin Brothers ===
#	Title	Date Published	Also In
0.5	A Cowboy's Promise	2017	
1	A Cowboy's Strength	2017	The McGavin Brothers Boxed Set: Books 1 - 3
2	A Cowboy's Honor	2017	The McGavin Brothers Boxed Set: Books 1 - 3
3	A Cowboy's Return	2017	The McGavin Brothers Boxed Set: Books 1 - 3
4	A Cowboy's Heart	2017	The McGavin Brothers Boxed Set: Books 4 - 6
5	A Cowboy's Courage	2017	The McGavin Brothers Boxed Set: Books 4 - 6
6	A Cowboy's Christmas	2017	The McGavin Brothers Boxed Set: Books 4 - 6
7	A Cowboy's Kiss	2018	
8	A Cowboy's Luck	2018	
9	A Cowboy's Charm	2018	
10	A Cowboy’s Challenge	2018	
11	A Cowboy’s Baby	2018	
12	A Cowboy’s Holiday	2018	
13	A Cowboy's Choice	2019	
14	A Cowboy’s Worth	2019	
15	A Cowboy's Destiny	2019	
16	A Cowboy's Secret	2019	
17	A Cowboy's Homecoming	2019	

=== The Nerds and Geeks of BMUS ===
#	Title	Date Published	Also In
1	The Geek Tycoon	2016	The Men of BMUS Box Set
2	Tender is the Nerd	2016	The Men of BMUS Box Set
3	It’s All Geek to Me	2016	The Men of BMUS Box Set
4	A Nerd to Remember	2016	The Men of BMUS Box Set

=== Drive Me ===
1. Drive Me Wild (2003)
2. Drive Me Crazy (2003)

=== Perfect Man ===
#	Title	Date Published	Also In
1	One Night with a Billionaire	2013	The Perfect Man
2	Tempted By a Cowboy	2013	The Perfect Man
3	Safe in His Arms	2013	The Perfect Man

=== Vintage VLT ===
1. Mingled Hearts (2014)
2. As Time Goes By (2014)
3. 'Tis the Season (2014)
4. The Fix-It Man (2015)

=== Anthologies and Collections ===
Anthology or Collection	Contents	Publication Date	In Collaboration With
A Match for Mom		1997	Anne Mather Linda Randall Wisdom
The Cupid Connection		1998	Anne Stuart Cathy Gillen Thacker
Escapade	Loverboy	1998	Margot Early Lynne Graham Rebecca York
My Secret Admirer	Once Upon a Mattress	1999	Marisa Carroll Anne Stuart
Perfect Summer		1999	Stephanie Bond Janice Kaiser JoAnn Ross
With a Stetson and a Smile / the Bridesmaid's Bet	With a Stetson and a Smile	1999	Christine Ridgeway
Bringing Up Baby New Year / Frisky Business	Bringing Up Baby New Year	1999	Tracy South
Mail-Order Grooms	Holding Out for a Hero	2000	Day Leclaire
Kissing Frosty / Santa in a Stetson	Santa in a Stetson	2000	Anne Stuart
Urban Cowboys	The Trailblazer The Drifter The Lawman	2001	
Taming the Lone Wolf / Single in the Saddle	Single in the Saddle	2001	Joan Johnston
In Hot Pursuit		2001	Roz Denny Fox Sherry Lewis
Midnight Fantasies	Mystery Lover	2001	Stephanie Bond Kimberly Raye
The Silent Type	Manhunting in Montana Bachelor Father Pure Temptation	2002	
Return to Crystal Creek	Return to Crystal Creek	2002	Bethany Campbell Cathy Gillen Thacker
Bedazzled	Impulse	2002	Rita Clay Estrada Jayne Ann Krentz
Behind the Red Doors	Heaven Scent	2003	Stephanie Bond Alison Kelly
Invitations to Seduction		2003	Janelle Denison Carly Phillips
The Longest Night		2004	Kathleen O'Reilly
Reading Between the Lines	Mr. Valentine	2004	Leslie Kelly
Fool for Love	Fooling Around	2004	Judith Arnold Stephanie Bond
Old Enough to Know Better / Sweet Talkin' Guy	Old Enough to Know Better	2004	Colleen Collins
Killer Cowboy Charm / Truth About Harry	Killer Cowboy Charm	2004	Tracy Kelleher
Getting Real	Surviving Sarah	2005	Jennifer LaBrecque Julie Elizabeth Leto
Summer Loving		2005	Rhonda Nelson
Killer Cowboy Charm / Sparking His Interest	Killer Cowboy Charm	2005	Wendy Etherington
Love and War / Hero in Disguise	Hero in Disguise	2005	Peg Sutherland
Undressed: Illicit Dreams / Unfinished Business / The Sweetest Taboo	Illicit Dreams	2005	Suzanne Forster Alison Kent
Double Exposure / Playing Games / The Gift of Joy	Double Exposure	2005	Dianne Drake Joan Hohl
A Fare to Remember: Just Whistle / Driven to Distraction / Taken for a Ride	Just Whistle	2006	Kate Hoffmann Julie Elizabeth Leto
Racing Hearts	A Calculated Risk	2010	Nancy Warren Dorien Kelly
Merry Christmas, Baby	It's Christmas, Cowboy!	2011	Jennifer LaBrecque Rhonda Nelson
Rescuing Christmas	Holiday Haven	2012	Catherine Mann Kathie DeNosky
Sons Of Chance	Wanted! Ambushed! Claimed!	2013	
The Perfect Man	One Night with a Billionaire Tempted By a Cowboy Safe in His Arms	2013	
Should've Been a Cowboy & Cowboy Up	Should've Been a Cowboy Cowboy Up	2015	
Sons of Chance Collection	Riding High Riding Hard Riding Home	2016	
The Men of BMUS Box Set	The Geek Tycoon Tender is the Nerd It’s All Geek to Me A Nerd to Remember	2016	
The McGavin Brothers Boxed Set: Books 1 - 3	A Cowboy's Strength A Cowboy's Honor A Cowboy's Return	2018	
The McGavin Brothers Boxed Set: Books 4 - 6	A Cowboy's Heart A Cowboy's Courage A Cowboy's Christmas	2018	
