= Jackie Diamond Hyman =

American novelist (born 1949)

Jackie Diamond Hyman Wilson
- Born: Jackie Diamond Hyman; April 3, 1949 (age 77); Menard, Texas, U.S.
- Education: Brandeis University
- Occupation: Novelist
- Spouse: Kurt Wilson (1978–present)
- Children: 2
- Writing career
- Pen name: Jacqueline Diamond, Jacqueline Topaz, Jacqueline Jade, Jackie Hyman, Jackie Diamond Hyman
- Language: English
- Period: 1982–present
- Genre: Romance
- Website: jacquelinediamond.com

Jackie Diamond Hyman (born April 3, 1949, in Menard, Texas, United States) is an American writer and former Associated Press reporter and columnist. Since 1982, she has written more than ninety novels in genres including romance, horror, fantasy and mystery under the pen names Jacqueline Diamond, Jacqueline Topaz, Jacqueline Jade, Jackie Hyman, and Jackie Diamond Hyman.

== Biography ==
=== Personal life ===
Jackie Diamond Hyman was born on April 3, 1949, in Menard, Texas, United States. She is the daughter of Maurice Hyman, M.D., former chief of psychiatry at the Veterans Administration Medical Center in Nashville, Tennessee, and ceramic sculptor Sylvia Hyman.

Hyman was married in 1978 to Kurt Wilson and has two sons.

=== Career ===
Hyman graduated from Brandeis University in Waltham, Massachusetts, and received a Thomas J. Watson Fellowship to travel and write in Europe.

After moving to Orange County, California, in 1972, she worked as a reporter and editor for The Orange Coast Daily Pilot and as a copy editor for the Orange County Register. She worked as a reporter and editor the Associated Press (AP) in Los Angeles from 1980 to 1983, and continued to write theater-related articles for the AP until 1999. In 1993–1994, she wrote a weekly television column for AP that was nationally distributed. She teaches short story, article and novel writing through Long Ridge Writers Group, and is the author of How to Write a Novel in One (Not-so-easy) Lesson.

She sold her first in 1982. Her book publishers include Harlequin Enterprises Ltd, William Morrow, St. Martin's Press, Five Star Press, Walker and Company, DAW Books and Berkley Books. Since 2010, she has been reissuing her early novels, including Regency romances and mysteries, in digital editions.

Hyman is a former national board member of Romance Writers of America and has also served on the board of the Orange County, California chapter. She is a two-time finalist for the Romance Writers of America's RITA Award and received a career achievement award from Romantic Times Book Club magazine.

== Bibliography ==
=== As Jacqueline Diamond ===
==== Historical romance novels ====
- Lady in Disguise (1982)
- Song for a Lady (1983)
- A Lady of Letters (1983)
- The Forgetful Lady (1984)
- The Day-Dreaming Lady (1985)
- A Lady's Point of View (1989)

==== Contemporary romance novels ====
- The Dream Never Dies (1984)
- Forgetful Day (1986)
- An Unexpected Man (1987)
- The Cinderella Dare (1988)
- A Ghost of a Chance (1988) aka The Ghost and Cheri
- Flight of Magic (1989)
- By Leaps and Bounds (1990)
- Old Dreams, New Dreams (1991)
- The Trouble With Terry (1992)
- A Dangerous Guy (1993)
- The Runaway Bride (1995)
- The Cowboy and the Heiress (1996)
- One Husband Too Many (1996)
- Yours, Mine and Ours (1996)
- Dear Lonely in L.A.... (1996)
- And the Bride Vanishes (1997)
- Daddy Warlock (1997)
- Million-Dollar Mommy (1997)
- Sandra and the Scoundrel (1997)
- Punchline (1997)
- A Real Live Sheikh (1998)
- His Secret Son (1999)
- Let's Make a Baby! (1999)
- Mistletoe Daddy (1999)
- Captured by a Sheikh (2000)
- Daddy, M.D. (2000)
- Kiss a Handsome Stranger (2001)
- Surprise, Doc! You're a Daddy! (2001)
- The Improperly Pregnant Princess (2002)
- Sheik Surrender (2004)
- The Stolen Bride (2004)
- The Baby's Bodyguard (2004)
- The Baby Scheme (2005)
- The Doctor's Little Secret (2007)
- Daddy Protector (2007)
- Touch Me in the Dark (2007)
- Twin Surprise (2007)
- The Bride's Surprise (2008)
- Doctor Daddy (2009)
- Sheikh Surrender (2012)
- Out of Her Universe (2012)

==== The Runaway Heiress Series ====
1. Unlikely Partners (1987)
2. Capers and Rainbows (1988)

==== Babies of Doctors Circle Series ====
1. Diagnosis: Expecting Boss's Baby (2003)
2. Prescription: Marry Her Immediately (2003)
3. Prognosis: A Baby? Maybe (2003)

==== Downhome Doctors Series ====
1. The Police Chief's Lady (2005)
2. Nine-Month Surprise (2006)
3. A Family at Last (2006)
4. Dad by Default (2006)
5. The Doctor + Four (2006)

==== Harmony Circle Series ====
1. The Family Next Door (2008)
2. Baby in Waiting (2008)
3. Million-dollar Nanny (2009)

==== Safe Harbor Medical Series ====
1. The Would-Be Mommy (2010)
2. His Hired Baby (2010)
3. The Holiday Triplets (2010)
4. Officer Daddy (2011)
5. Falling for the Nanny (2011)
6. The Surgeon's Surprise Twins (2011)
7. The Detective's Accidental Baby (2012)
8. The Baby Dilemma (2012)
9. The M.D.'s Secret Daughter (2012)
10. The Baby Jackpot (2013)
11. His Baby Dream (2013)
12. The Surprise Holiday Dad (2014)
13. A Baby for the Doctor (2014)
14. The Surprise Triplets (2014)
15. The Baby Bonanza (2015)
16. The Doctor's Accidental Family (2015)
17. The Would-Be Daddy (2016)

==== Brides Of Grazer's Corner multi-author series ====
1. The Cowboy and the Shotgun Bride (1998)

==== The Wedding Party multi-author series ====
3. Assignment: Groom! (1999)

==== Maitland Maternity multi-author series ====
2. I Do! I Do! (2000)

==== Forrester Square multi-author series ====
9. Illegally Yours (2004)

==== Code Red multi-author series ====
11. The Trigger (2005)

==== Omnibus ====
- Cindy and the Fella / Calling All Glass Slippers (2002)

==== Collections in collaboration ====
- Kidnapped / I Got You Babe (1999) (with Bonnie Tucker)
- The Bachelor Dads of Nowhere Junction (Designer Genes / Two for One!) (2000) (with Charlotte Maclay)
- The Doc's Double Delivery / Down-Home Diva (2001) (with Stephanie Doyle)
- Excuse Me?, Whose Baby? / Follow that Baby! (2001) (with Isabel Sharpe)
- More Than the Doctor Ordered / A Hitchin' Time (2001) (with Charlotte Maclay)
- Tyler Brides (2001) (with Heather MacAllister and Kristine Rolofson)
- Heaven Scent / Shotgun Nanny (2002) (with Nancy Warren)
- Paris or Bust! (2003) (with Kate Hoffmann and Jill Shalvis)
- The Third Twin / Sheikh Surrender (2004) (with Dani Sinclair)
- Secrets & Sons (His Secret Son / A Man of Secrets) (2004) (with Amanda Stevens)
- More Than the Doctor Ordered / Husband Hotel (2004) (with Darlene Gardner)
- Stolen Bride / Sudden Recall (2004) (with Jean Barrett)
- Surprise! Surprise! / I Do! I Do! (2005) (with Tina Leonard)
- A Bundle of Valentines! (2008) (with Cherry Adair, Judith Bowen, Rebecca Brandewyne, Maureen Child, Muriel Jensen, Cait London, Heather McAllister, Jude McBride, Tara Taylor Quinn, Wendy Rosnau, Anne Stuart and Vicki Lewis Thompson)
- The Sheikh's Dilemma (2010) (with Loreth Anne White and Laura Wright)
- The Bride Wore Gym Shoes / Maddie's Millionaire (2011) (with Tracy South)

==== Non-fiction ====
- How to Write a Novel in One (not-so-easy) Lesson (2011)
- A Romance Writer's Guide to Love and Marriage (2011) (with Kurt Wilson)

=== As Jacqueline Topaz ===
==== Contemporary romance novels ====
- Deeper Than Desire (1984)
- Swept Away (1985)
- Rites of Passion (1985)
- Lucky in Love (1985)
- Golden Girl (1986)
- A Warm December (1988)

=== As Jacqueline Jade ===
==== Contemporary romance novels ====
- A Lucky Star (1986)

=== As Jackie Hyman ===
==== Fantasy novels ====
- Shadowlight (1989)

==== Mystery novels ====
- The Eyes of a Stranger (1987)
- Echoes (1990)

=== As Jackie Diamond Hyman ===
==== Mystery novels ====
- Danger Music (2004)
