= Susan Wiggs =

American author and novelist

- Born: May 17, 1958 (age 68); United States
- Education: Harvard University
- Occupation: Novelist
- Writing career
- Period: 1987–present
- Genre: Romance
- Website: www.susanwiggs.com

Susan Wiggs (born May 17, 1958) is an American author of historical and contemporary romance novels.

== Early years ==
Wiggs began writing as a child, finishing her first novel, A Book About Some Bad Kids, when she was eight. She temporarily abandoned her dream of being a novelist after graduating from Harvard University, instead becoming a math teacher. She continued to read, especially reveling in romance novels. After running out of reading material one evening in 1983, she began writing again, using the working title A Book About Some Bad Adults.

== Career ==
For three years Wiggs continued to write, and in 1987 Zebra Books published her first novel, a Western historical romance named Texas Wildflower. Her subsequent historical and contemporary romances have been set in a wide range of settings and time periods. Many of her novels are set in areas where she's lived or visited. She gave up teaching in 1992 to write full-time, and has since completed an average of two books per year.

In 2000, Wiggs began writing single-title women's fiction stories in addition to historical romance novels. The first, The You I Never Knew, was published in 2001. After writing mass-market original novels for several years, Wiggs made her hardcover debut in 2003 with Home Before Dark.

Many of her novels are connected, allowing Wiggs to revisit established characters.

Her books have been published in many languages, including French, German, Dutch, Latvian, Japanese, Hungarian and Russian.

== Awards ==
Wiggs's books are frequently named finalists for the RITA Award, the highest honor given in the genre. She received the Romance Writers of America RITA Award for Best Romance of the year in 1993 for Lord of the Night. She won a second RITA in 2000 when The Charm School was named "Favorite Book of the Year." She has also won the RITA in 2001 for Best Short Historical for The Mistress. and in 2006 for Lakeside Cottage. She has also been the recipient of the Holt Medallion, the Colorado Award of Excellence, and the Peninsula Romance Writers of America Blue Boa Award. Romantic Times has twice named her a Career Achievement Award winner.

== Personal ==
Wiggs lives on Bainbridge Island, Washington. Her mother maintains her web page.

== Bibliography ==
=== Stand-alone novels ===
- Texas Wildflower (1987)
- Briar Rose (1987)
- Winds of Glory (1988)
- Embrace the Day (1988)
- Moonshadow (1989)
- The Raven and the Rose (1991)
- Lord of the Night (1993)
- Miranda (1996)
- Merry Christmas, Baby! (1996)
- The Lightkeeper (1998)
- The Drifter (1999)
- Husband for Hire (1999)
- The You I Never Knew (2001)
- Passing Through Paradise (2002)
- Home Before Dark (2003)
- Summer by the Sea (2004)
- Lakeside Cottage (2005)
- Table for Five (2005)
- Just Breathe (2008)
- The Borrowed Bride (2008)
- How I Planned Your Wedding (2011)
- The Goodbye Quilt (2011) also in The Summer It Begins
- The St. James Affair (2014) also in Snowfall in the City
- A Fairytale Christmas (2014)
- Island Time (2016)
- Map of the Heart (2017)
- Between You and Me (June 26, 2018)
- The Oysterville Sewing Circle (2019)
- Welcome to Beachtown (2023)
- The Twelve Dogs of Christmas (2023)
- Wayward Girls (2025)

=== Lakeshore Chronicles ===
#	Title	Also In	Publication Date
1	Summer At Willow Lake		2006
1.5	Homecoming Season	More Than Words: Stories of Courage	
2	The Winter Lodge		2007
3	Dockside		2007
4	Snow Fall at Willow Lake	Snowstorm Heat Bundle	2008
5	Fireside		2009
6	Lakeshore Christmas		2009
7	The Summer Hideaway		2010
8	Marrying Daisy Bellamy		2011
9	Return to Willow Lake		2012
10	Candlelight Christmas	Snowfall in the City	2013
11	Starlight of Willow Lake		2015

=== Bella Vista Chronicles ===
#	Title	Also In	Publication Date
1	The Apple Orchard		2013
2	The Beekeeper's Ball		2014
3	The Lost and Found Bookshop		2020
4	Sugar and Salt		2022

=== Switchback, Vermont ===
#	Title	Also In	Publication Date
0.5	The Key Ingredient		2016
1	Family Tree		2016

=== Calhoun Chronicles ===
#	Title	Also In	Publication Date
1	The Charm School	The Calhoun Chronicles Bundle	1999
2	The Horsemaster's Daughter	The Calhoun Chronicles Bundle	1999
3	Halfway to Heaven	The Calhoun Chronicles Bundle	2001
4	Enchanted Afternoon		2003
5	A Summer Affair		2003

=== Us series ===
#	Title	Also In	Publication Date
1	The Ocean Between Us		2004
2	The Story of Us		2010

=== Great Chicago Fire Trilogy ===
#	Title	Also In	Publication Date
1	The Hostage		2000
2	The Mistress		2000
3	The Firebrand		2001

=== Tudor Rose series ===
#	Title	Also In	Publication Date	Notes
1	At The King's Command		1994	Circle in the Water revised, reissued and renamed in 2009
2	The Maidens Hand		1995	Vows Made in Wine revised, reissued and renamed in 2009
3	At The Queens Summons		1996	Dancing on Air revised, reissued and renamed in 2009

=== Women of War series ===
#	Title	Also In	Publication Date
1	The Lily and the Leopard		1991
2	The Mistress of Normandy		1991
3	The Mist and the Magic		1993
4	The Maiden of Ireland		1993

=== Discovery series ===
#	Title	Also In	Publication Date
1	October Wind		1994
2	Jewel of the Sea		1994
3	Kingdom of Gold		1994

=== Picture books ===
- The Canary Who Sailed with Columbus (1989)

=== Anthologies and collections ===
Anthology or Collection	Contents	Publication Date	In Collaboration With
Purrfect Romance		1995	Jennifer Blake Robin Lee Hatcher
Irish Magic	The Trysting Hour	1995	Barbara Samuel Roberta GellisMorgan Llywelyn
This Time...Marriage		1996	Muriel Jensen Janice Kaiser
Irish Magic II	The Changeling	1997	Barbara Samuel Roberta GellisMorgan Llywelyn
That Summer Place	Island Time	1998	Jill Barnett Debbie Macomber
The 10-Year Reunion	Heart of the West Bachelor Auction #1	1999	
Cinderfella / Lady of the Night	Cinderfella	2002	Kate Hoffmann
It Happened One Christmas		2003	Julie McBride Nancy Warren
More Than Words: Volume 3		2003	Tori Carrington Karen Harper Catherine Mann Kasey Michaels
The Calhoun Chronicles Bundle	The Charm School The Horsemaster's Daughter Halfway to Heaven	2007	
Snowstorm Heat Bundle	Snowfall at Willow Lake	2008	Catherine Mann Kate Hoffmann
More Than Words: Stories of Courage	Homecoming Season	2008	Sharon Sala Emilie Richards
Romancing the Holidays Bundle 2009		2009	Sherryl Woods Lindsay McKenna Carole Mortimer
Snowfall in the City	The St. James Affair Candlelight Christmas	2019	
The Summer It Begins	The Goodbye Quilt	2019	Sheila Roberts
