= Debra Webb =

American novelist

- Born: 1958 (age 67–68); Alabama, U.S.
- Occupation: Novelist
- Writing career
- Period: 1999 – present
- Genre: Suspense
- Website: www.debrawebb.com

Debra Webb (born 1958) is a USA Today bestselling American author of suspense novels.

== Biography ==
Debra Webb grew up on a farm outside Scottsboro, Alabama. Although her family was not wealthy, Webb cites her parents' hard work as teaching her "that I could be anything if I wanted it badly enough and was willing to work hard enough." Webb had always created stories in her head, and when she turned nine she began to write them down.

After she married, Webb continued to invent stories but grew too busy to write them down. To help pay the family's bills, she sold vacuum cleaners and took jobs working in factories or at fast food restaurants. After the birth of their first child, Webb's husband joined the military, and she entered college. After Webb earned a degree in Business Administration, her husband was stationed in Berlin, Germany. Webb worked as a secretary in the commanding general's office. She and her family returned to the United States in 1985, and Webb accepted a position as an executive secretary at NASA.

In 1995, after a chronic illness, Webb decided to focus on her stories again. For three years, she researched the romance novel market and wrote. In 1998, she sold her first novel, a comedic romance novel, to Kensington Books' Precious Gems line. Six weeks later, she sold a second novel, this time to Harlequin's Intrigue line.

Her first Harlequin Intrigue concerned a private investigation agency run by Victoria Colby. Since that book, Webb has moved into the mainstream suspense genre and has written over one hundred sixty novels.

== Awards ==
Webb is a Romantic Times Career Achievement Winner. She has been nominated five times for Romantic Times Reviewers' Choice Awards, winning twice.

== Bibliography ==
=== Novels ===
- Tempting Trace (1999)
- Up Close (1999)
- Here to Stay (2000)
- Home Free (2000)
- Keeping Kennedy (2000)
- Special Assignment, Baby (2001)
- Longwalker's Child (2001)
- Safe by His Side (2001)
- The Bodyguard's Baby (2001)
- Protective Custody (2002)
- Personal Protector (2002)
- Physical Evidence (2002)
- The Marriage Prescription (2002)
- Contract Bride (2002)
- Solitary Soldier (2002)
- The Doctor Wore Boots (2002)
- Guardian of the Night (2003)
- Guarding the Heiress (2003)
- Her Hidden Truth (2003)
- Nobody's Baby (2003)
- Undercover Wife (2003)
- Keeping Baby Safe (2003)
- Her Secret Alibi (2003)
- Full Exposure (2004)
- Situation: Out of Control (2004)
- Romancing the Tycoon (2004)
- Striking Distance (2004)
- Cries in the Night (2004)
- Agent Cowboy (2004)*Silent Reckoning (2005)
- Urban Sensation (2005)
- Dying to Play (2005)
- Tremors (2005)
- Executive Bodyguard: The Enforcers (2005)
- Executive Bodyguard (2005)
- Man of Her Dreams (2005)
- Colby Agency Back to the Beginning (2005)
- Colby Conspiracy (2005)
- A Colby Christmas (2006)
- Person Of Interest (2006)
- Vows of Silence (2006)
- Investigating 101 (2006)
- Raw Talent (2006)
- Past Sins (2006)
- Never Happened (2006)
- The Hidden Heir (2006)
- Silent Weapon (2006)
- Staying Alive (2007)
- Danger Zone (2007)
- A Soldier's Oath (2007)
- Hostage Situation (2007)
- Traceless (2007)
- Out-Foxxed (2007)
- Colby Vs. Colby (2007)
- Colby Rebuilt (2007)
- Nameless (2008)

=== Omnibus ===
- Whispers in the Night (2003) (with Amanda Stevens)
- A Stranger's Kiss (2003) (with Anne Stuart)
- Double Impact (2003) (with Tess Gerritsen)
- Mysteries of Lost Angel Inn (2004) (with Kathleen O'Brien, Evelyn Rogers)
- Unsanctioned Memories / Cries in the Night (2004) (with Julie Miller)
- Files from the Colby Agency: The Bodyguard's Baby / Protective Custody (2005)
- Epiphany: An Angel for Christmas / Undercover Santa / Merry's Christmas (2005) (with Rita Herron, Mallory Kane)
- Marriage Prescription / Guarding the Heiress / Romancing the Tycoon (2005)
- A NASCAR Holiday: Ladies, Start Your Engines... / 'Tis the Silly Season / Unbreakable (2006) (with Kimberly Raye, Roxanne St. Claire)
- Bet Me: The Ace / The Joker / The Wildcard (2007) (with Catherine Mann, Joanne Rock)
