= Simply Irresistible =

Simply Irresistible may refer to:

- "Simply Irresistible" (song), a 1988 song by Robert Palmer
- Simply Irresistible (film), a 1999 film starring Sarah Michelle Gellar
- "Simply Irresistible", a story by Miranda Lee
- Simply Irresistible, a 2010 novel by Jill Shalvis
