= Penguin Group =

Trade book publisher, part of Penguin Random House, owned by Bertelsmann

- Founded: 30 July 1935; 90 years ago (as Penguin Books)
- Founder: Allen Lane; V. K. Krishna Menon; Richard Lane; John Lane
- Headquarters: 20 Vauxhall Bridge Rd, London, United Kingdom
- Products: Books
- Revenue: ▼£1.05 billion (2010)
- Parent: Penguin Random House
- Website: penguin.co.uk

Penguin Group is a British trade book publisher and part of Penguin Random House, which is owned by the German media conglomerate Bertelsmann. The new company was created by a merger that was finalised on 1 July 2013, with Bertelsmann initially owning 53% of the joint venture, and Pearson PLC initially owning the remaining 47%. Since 18 December 2019, Penguin Random House has been wholly owned by Bertelsmann.

Penguin Books has its registered office in the City of Westminster, London.

Its British division is Penguin Books Ltd. Other separate divisions are located in the United States, Ireland, New Zealand, India, Australia, Canada, China, Brazil and South Africa.

== History ==
Penguin Books Ltd. (est. 1935) of the United Kingdom was bought by Pearson Longman in 1970. In 1975, Penguin acquired the American hardcover firm Viking Press. In 1986, Penguin acquired the New American Library, a mass-market paperback publisher. In 1995, Penguin acquired the independent publisher Donald I. Fine.

Penguin Group (USA) Inc. was formed in 1996 as a result of the merger between Penguin Books USA and the Putnam Berkley Group after Penguin acquired Putnam Berkley from MCA. The newly formed company was originally called Penguin Putnam Inc., but, in 2003, it changed its name to Penguin Group (USA) Inc. to reflect the parent Pearson PLC's grouping of all the Penguin companies worldwide under the supervisory umbrella of Pearson's own Penguin Group division.

The different Penguin companies use many imprints, many of which used to be independent publishers. Penguin Group (USA) Inc. also operates its own speaker's bureau that books speaking engagements for many of the publisher's authors. In 2011, the online writing and publishing community Book Country was launched as a subsidiary of Penguin Group USA.

On 11 April 2012, the United States Department of Justice filed United States v. Apple Inc., naming Apple, Penguin, and four other major publishers as defendants. The suit alleged that they conspired to fix prices for e-books and weaken Amazon.com's position in the market in violation of antitrust law. In December 2013, a federal judge approved a settlement of the antitrust claims, in which Penguin and the other publishers paid into a fund that provided credits to customers who had overpaid for books due to the price-fixing.

On 26 October 2012, Pearson entered into talks with rival conglomerate Bertelsmann, over the possibility of combining their respective publishing companies, Penguin Group and Random House. The houses were considered two of the 'Big Six' publishing companies prior to the merger, which became the 'Big Five' upon its completion. The European Union approved the Penguin Random House merger on 5 April 2013.

== Imprints ==
Penguin Group imprints include the following:

- Avery Publishing
- Berkley Books
  - Ace Books
  - Jove Books
  - New American Library (NAL)
    - E. P. Dutton
    - Dutton Children's
    - Plume
    - Obsidian
    - Onyx
    - Roc Books
    - Signet Books
    - Signet Classics
    - Signet Eclipse
    - Topaz
- Cartoon Network Books
- Companhia das Letras (70%)
- Dial Press
  - Dial Books
  - Dial Books for Young Readers
- DK
  - Alpha Books
  - DK Eyewitness Travel
- Firebird Books
- Frederick Warne & Co
- G. P. Putnam's Sons
  - Amy Einhorn
  - Marian Wood
  - Coward-McCann
  - G. P. Putnam's Sons Books for Young Readers
- Grosset & Dunlap
  - Charter Books (Ace Charter)
  - Bedtime Stories
  - Junior Library
  - Platt & Munk
- HP Books (founded 1964, primarily an automotive book publisher)
- Kokila
- Ladybird Books
- Pamela Dorman Books
- Pelican Books
- Penguin Books
  - Awa Press
  - Hamish Hamilton
  - Michael Joseph
  - Penguin Classics
  - Penguin Press (founded 2003, for literary nonfiction and fiction)
  - Penguin Young Readers Group
    - Crash Course Books
    - Price Stern Sloan
    - Puffin Books
  - Viking Press
    - Viking Children's
- TarcherPerigee
- Philomel Books
- Portfolio
- Razorbill
- Riverhead Books
- Sentinel
- Speak

== See also ==
- The other 'Big Five' English-language book publishers:
  - Hachette, Holtzbrinck/Macmillan, HarperCollins and Simon & Schuster
- Amazon Breakthrough Novel Award
- Pearson Education
- Penguin Group (USA) Inc. v. American Buddha
