= Kristine Rolofson =

American novelist

- Born: December 9, 1951 (age 74); Rhode Island, U.S.
- Occupation: Novelist
- Writing career
- Period: 1987–present
- Genre: Romantic novel

Kristine Rolofson (born December 9, 1951, in Rhode Island, U.S.) is an American writer of over 35 romance novels since 1987.

== Biography ==
Rolofson grew up reading books by Zane Grey. At age 18 she married her high school history teacher and had six children.

For years, she ran the Rolofson's Gift Shop, until Mount St. Helens' volcano blew, scattering ash across the northwest and preventing tourists from visiting the gift shop. To occupy her time, she read 200 Harlequin romances and began writing her own novel.

For 12 years, the Rolofsons lived in the mountains of North Idaho before moving to New England in 1987, the year her first novel was published. For years she combined writing with work as a waitress, wallpaper hanger, secretary, and seamstress. She now writes full-time and travels.

== Bibliography ==
=== Single novels ===
- One of the Family (1987)
- Stuck on You (1989)
- Bound for Bliss ng muntinlupa (1990)
- The Last Great Affair (1991)
- All That Glitters (1992)
- The Perfect Husband (1992)
- Baby Blues (1994)
- Plain Jane's Man (1994)
- Madeleine's Cowboy (1994)
- I'll Be Seeing You (1994)
- Jessie's Lawman (1995)
- The Cowboy (1995)
- Make-Believe Honeymoon (1995)
- The Texan Takes a Wife (1996)
- A Touch of Texas (1997)
- Billy and the Kid (2000)
- A Montana Christmas (2002)

=== Born in the United States Series Multi-Author ===
- Somebody's Hero (1990)

=== Boots and booties Series ===
1. The Last Man in Montana (1996)
2. The Only Man in Wyoming (1997)
3. The Next Man in Texas (1997)
4. The Wrong Man in Wyoming (1998)
5. The Right Man in Montana (1998)
6. The Best Man in Texas (2004)
7. Made in Texas (2004)
- Boots and Booties (Omnibus) (2000)
- Brides, Boots and Booties (Omnibus) (2001)

=== Lets Celebrate Series ===
- Pillow Talk (1997)

=== Brides On The Run Series ===
- The Bride Rode West (1997)

=== Boots And Beauties Series ===
1. Blame It on Cowboys (2000)
2. Blame It on Babies (2001)
3. Blame It on Texas (2001)

=== Montana Matchmakers Series ===
1. A Wife for Owen Chase (2001)
2. A Bride for Calder Brown (2001)
3. A Man for Maggie Moore (2001)

=== Cooper's Corner Series Multi-Author ===
- The Baby and the Bachelor (2002)

=== Collections ===
- Lap of Luxury: The Perfect Husband / Stuck On You / Make-believe Honeymoon (2002)

=== Omnibus in collaboration ===
- Millennium Baby (1999) (with Judith Arnold and Bobby Hutchinson)
- Tyler Brides (2001) (with Jacqueline Diamond and Heather MacAllister)
- Meant to Be (2001) (with Barbara Delinsky and Jayne Ann Krentz)
- A Wedding at Cooper's Corner (2002) (with Bobby Hutchinson and Muriel Jensen)
- Date with Destiny (2003) (with Kristin Gabriel and Muriel Jensen) (Stop the Wedding! / Oh, Baby! / A Night to Remember)
- The Truth about Cats and Dogs (2004) (with Caroline Burnes and Lori Foster) (Tailspin / Secondhand Sam / Familiar Pursuit)
- Wilde for You / Best Man in Texas (2004) (with Dawn Atkins)
- Baby, it's Cold Outside / Family Doctor / Baby Gift (2004) (with Bethany Campbell and Bobby Hutchinson)
- Summer Temptations (2004) (with Lori Foster)
- Made in Texas / We've Got Tonight (2005) (with Jacquie D'Alessandro)
- Christmas Carol / Montana Christmas (2005) (with Kathleen O'Reilly)

== References and sources ==
- Harlequin Enterprises Ltd's Website
