= Jacqueline Diamond =

Jacqueline Diamond may refer to:

- Jackie Diamond Hyman (born 1949) pen name Jacqueline Diamond, American writer and former Associated Press reporter and columnist
- Coca Crystal (1947 – 2016) née Jacqueline Diamond, American underground personality
