= Star quality =

Star quality may refer to:

- Charisma, in quantities allowing for a chance at celebrity
- Glamour
- Star Quality, the last play by Noël Coward
- Star Quality, a novel by Joan Collins
- Star Quality, a romance-novel omnibus with works by Lori Foster, Lucy Monroe, and Dianne Castell
- Star Quality, an American short film featuring Jaime Ray Newman
- Star Quality, a short lived UK gameshow hosted by Gyles Brandreth
