= Tori Carrington =

American novelist

Tony Karayianni & Lori Schlachter Karayianni
- Born: Tony: Smila, Greece; Lori: Toledo, Ohio, United States
- Occupation: Novelist
- Writing career
- Pen name: Tori Carrington
- Period: 1998–present
- Genre: Romance
- Website: www.tori-carrington.com

Tori Carrington was the pen name by the husband–wife writing team of Tony Karayianni and Lori Schlachter Karayianni. They have written over 50 romance novels since 1998, in addition to the 6 hardcover comedic-mystery Sofie Metropolis, P.I. series. Lori carries on under the pseudonym.

== Biography ==
Tony Karayianni was born in Smila, Greece and he grew up in Athens. He immigrated to the United States in late 1976. He died on April 16, 2016. Lori Schlachter was born in Toledo, Ohio, United States. She studied at Catholic Central and graduated with a degree in computer science from Macomber-Whitney. For years, she worked in the computer industry.

They began writing in June 1984. Their first novel was published in 1998 as Tori Carrington ("Tori" is formed from "Tony" and "Lori"). Karayianni and Schlachter married in 1987. They had two sons, Tony, Jr. and Tim.

== Bibliography ==
=== Single novels ===
- Constant Craving (1998)
- Just Eight Months Old... (2000)
- You Sexy Thing! (2001)
- Skin Deep (2002)
- Private Investigations (2002)
- Dangerous... (2007)

=== Magnificent McCoy Men series ===
1. License to Thrill (1999)
2. The P.I. Who Loved Her (2000)
3. For Her Eyes Only (2000)
4. You Only Love Once (2001)
5. Never Say Never Again (2001)
6. From McCoy, With Love (2005)
7. A Real McCoy (2005)
- Seducing McCoy: You Only Love Once / Never Say Never Again (omnibus) (2006)

=== Old Orchard series ===
1. The Woman for Dusty Conrad (2001)
2. What a Woman Wants (2002)
3. Where You Least Expect It (2004)

=== Legal Briefs series ===
1. A Stranger's Touch (2002)
2. Fire and Ice (2002)
3. Going Too Far (2003)

=== Kiss and Tell series ===
1. Night Fever (2003)
2. Flavor of the Month (2003)
3. Just Between Us... (2003)

=== Sleeping with Secrets series ===
1. Forbidden (2004)
2. Indecent (2004)
3. Wicked (2004)

=== Dangerous Liaisons series ===
1. Possession (2005)
2. Obsession (2006)
3. Submission (2006)

=== Sofie Metropolis series ===
1. Sofie Metropolis (2005)
2. Dirty Laundry (2006)
3. Foul Play (2007)
4. Working Stiff (2008)
5. Love Bites {2011}
6. Queens Ransom {2012}

=== Trueblood Texas series ===
- Every Move You Make (2002)

=== Bad Girls Club series ===
- Red-hot and Reckless (2003)
- Taken (2007)

=== Code Red series ===
- Total Exposure (2004)

=== Omnibus in collaboration ===
- More Than Words: Volume 3 (2003) (with Karen Harper, Catherine Mann, Kasey Michaels and Susan Wiggs) (Homecoming Season / Find the Way / Here Comes the Heroes / Touched by Love / Stitch in Time)
- Private Scandals (2004) (with Judy Christenberry and Joanna Wayne) (Shadows of the Past / Family Unveiled / Sleeping with Secrets)
- Where You Least Expect It / Isn't it Rich? (2004) (with Sherryl Woods)
- Marry Me... Maybe?: License to Thrill / I Thee Wed (2004) (with Anne McAllister)
- That's Amore! (2005) (with Janelle Denison and Leslie Kelly) (Meet the Parents / I Do, Don't I? / There Goes the Groom)
- Wedding Fever (2006) (with Janelle Denison and Leslie Kelly)
