= Lilian Darcy =

Australian writer (born 1958)

- Born: 14 February 1958 (age 68); Australia
- Occupation: Novelist
- Writing career
- Pen name: Lilian Darcy
- Period: 1981–present
- Genre: Romantic novel
- Website: www.liliandarcy.com

Lilian Darcy (born 14 February 1958 in Adelaide, South Australia) is popular Australian writer of over 75 medical romance novels since 1981.

== Biography ==
Lilian Darcy grew up reading the books by L.M. Montgomery. She obtained an Arts degree with majors in Linguistics, Russian and French.

She worked as a nanny in the French Alps and extensively in theatre, both on stage and as a playwright. Later, she worked as teacher of French and English, she changed her career to computer programming before marriage with a New Yorker writer. They started their married life in New Jersey and Ohio. She published her first novel in 1981.

Now, she and her husband live in New South Wales, Australia with their three sons and their daughter.

== Bibliography ==
=== Single novels ===
- Bright Crystals (1981)
- New Caledonian Nurse (1982)
- New Doctor at the Boronia (1983)
- Nurse at Twin Valleys (1984)
- Patience and Dr. Pritchard (1985)
- Sister Madeleine (1985)
- Flying Doctor (1986)
- Valentines for Nurse Cleo (1987)
- Calling Air Doctor Three (1988)
- Sister Page's Past (1989)
- Unwilling Partners (1990)
- Practical Marriage (1991)
- Challenge of Doctor Blake (1991)
- Closer to a Stranger (1992)
- The Beckhill Tradition (1992)
- A Private Arrangement (1993)
- Heart Call (1993)
- No More Secrets (1994)
- A Father's Love (1994)
- Running Away (1994)
- Conflicting Loyalties (1995)
- Midwife's Dilemma (1995)
- Demi's Diagnosis (1996)
- Full Recovery (1997)
- A Gift for Healing (1997)
- Misleading Symptoms (1997)
- Making Babies (1997)
- Miracle Baby (1998)
- Tomorrow's Child (1998)
- A Specialist's Opinion (1998)
- Wanting Dr. Wilde (1998)
- The Baby Bond (1999)
- Her Passion for Dr. Jones (1999)
- The Courage to Say Yes (1999)
- Her Sister's Child (2000)
- Raising Baby Jane (2000)
- The Marriage of Dr. Marr (2000)
- Winning Her Back (2000)
- The Surrogate Mother (2000)
- The Truth About Charlotte (2000)
- Midwife and Mother (2001)
- A Nurse in Crisis (2001)
- The Paramedic's Secret (2001)
- For the Taking (2002)
- The Surgeon's Love-child (2002)
- The Doctor's Mistress (2002)
- Pregnant and Protected (2002)
- A Mother for His Child (2002)
- Balancing Act (2003)
- Incurably Isabelle (2003)
- Racing Hearts (2003)
- The Surgeon's Proposal (2003)
- No Strings (2003)
- The Midwife's Courage (2003)
- The Honourable Midwife (2003)
- The Boss's Baby Surprise: Soulmates (2004)
- Caring for His Babies (2004)
- The Doctor's Unexpected Family (2004)
- The Honorable Midwife (2004)
- The A and E Consultant's Secret (2004)
- Their Miracle Baby (2005)
- The Doctor's Fire Rescue (2005)
- The Millionaire's Cinderella Wife (2005)
- The Boss's Baby Surprise (2005)
- The Life Saver (2005)
- The Father Factor (2005)
- Sister Swap (2006)
- Pregnant with His Child (2006)
- The Couple Most Likely to (2007)
- Long-Lost Son: Brand New Family (2007)

=== The Cinderella Conspiracy Series ===
1. Cinderella after midnight (2001)
2. Saving Cinderella (2001)
3. Finding Her Prince (2002)

=== Wanted: Outback Wives ===
1. The Runaway and the Cattleman (2006)
2. Princess in Disguise (2006)
3. Outback Baby (2006)

=== Omnibus in collaboration ===
- The Midnight Hour (2004) (with Kate Hoffmann and Kate Walker)
- Emergency: Expecting (2005) (with Carol Marinelli and Sarah Morgan)
- Verdict / What's A Dad to Do? / Father Factor (2005) (with Annette Broadrick and Charlotte Douglas)
- Heart of a Hero (2006) (with Abigail Gordon and Laura MacDonald)
- Australian Affairs (2007) (with Lucy Clark and Leah Martyn)
