= Nancy Warren (author) =

Canadian writer

- Born: Vancouver, British Columbia
- Occupation: novelist
- Writing career
- Genres: contemporary romance and cozy mystery
- Website: www.nancywarrenauthor.com

Nancy Warren is a Canadian writer of contemporary romance and cozy mystery. She received her first publication contract after winning Harlequin's 2000 Summer Blaze contest. Since then, she has released more than 100 novels, novellas, and short stories, has been twice nominated for the Romance Writers of America's RITA Award, and won a Romantic Times Reviewers' Choice Award.

== Biography ==
Warren was born and raised in Vancouver, British Columbia. After graduating with an honours degree in English literature from the University of British Columbia, she began work as a journalist. For five years, she worked her way up the journalistic ladder, from answering phones to writing to editing. The work taught her the need for brevity and clarity in writing, as well as the fact that an article must grab the reader's attention immediately.

Ready for a change, Warren moved into corporate communications and public relations. She worked for both government and businesses and ran her own company for a time. She quit her job when her husband was transferred to Vancouver, and spent the next four years learning how to write a novel. In 1999, she won the Molly Contest in the Short Contemporary Category. The following year, she entered Harlequin Books's 2000 Summer Blaze Contest. The contest, designed to highlight the new Harlequin Blaze line of category romances, required her to submit a 10-page love scene and a synopsis for a complete book. Warren won the contest, giving her a contract to write her Blaze novel. Two weeks later, Harlequin bought two manuscripts which she had previously submitted. One of these, Flashback, became her first published novel, a July 2001 Harlequin Temptation. The other, Shotgun Nanny, became a Harlequin Duet. Her submission for the Blaze contest became her second publication, Live a Little.

Warren has continued to write for both the Harlequin Temptation and Harlequin Blaze lines. She says these are her favorite lines because of "the contemporary tone, the sexy feel", and that many of them contain humour. The two lines are similar, except that Blaze allows for a longer book (by about 15,000 words) and has steamier love scenes. In 2004, Warren branched into single-title novels with the release of Drive Me Crazy. In 2007, she became the launch author for a new Harlequin series celebrating NASCAR. She wrote the first and last book in the sixteen-book series. Both of her novels featured cameo appearances by real-life NASCAR driver Carl Edwards, who worked closely with Warren to create a "suitable fictional representation of himself." Her work with the NASCAR series was featured on the front page of the New York Times.

Each of her category romance novels takes Warren approximately three months to write, and she often spends six months or more writing her single-title novels. Her goal is to finish at least ten rough draft pages per day. Warren claims to always be planning her next book while writing. Although she lives in Canada, the majority of her novels have been set in the United States, usually in places that she has visited.

== Awards ==
Warren has written more than 100 novels, novellas, and short stories, some of which have appeared on the USA Today Bestseller List. She has won the Lauren Wreath Award, the Colorado Romance Writers Award, and a Romantic Times Reviewers' Choice Award for Best Blaze. She has further been nominated for a Romantic Times Career Achievement Award in series romance, and has twice been nominated for the Romance Writers of America RITA Award, the romance author's equivalent of an Academy Award.

== Bibliography ==
=== Novels ===
- Flashback (2001)
- Live a Little! (2001)
- Whisper (2002)
- Breathless (2002)
- By the Book (2003)
- Hot Off the Press (2003)
- Fringe Benefits (2003)
- Bad Boys Down Under (2004)
- Underneath It All (2004)
- Drive Me Crazy (2004)
- Turn Left at Sanity (2005)
- Aftershocks (Code Red) (2005)
- Private Relations (2005)
- British Bad Boys (2006)
- Indulge (2006)
- The Trouble With Twins (2006)
- Speed Dating (2007)
- Turn Two (2007)
- French Kissing (2008)
- The One I Want (2008)

Toni Diamond Mystery Series

- Frosted Shadow - Book 1 (2011)
- Ultimate Concealer - Book 2
- Midnight Shimmer - Book 3
- A Diamond Choker For Christmas - A Holiday Whodunnit Novella

Take a Chance Series

- Chance Encounter - Prequel
- Kiss a Girl in the Rain - Book 1 (2014)
- Iris in Bloom - Book 2
- Blueprint for a Kiss - Book 3
- Every Rose - Book 4
- Love to Go - Book 5
- The Sheriff's Sweet Surrender - Book 6
- The Daisy Game - Book 7

The Almost Wives Club Series

- The Almost Wives Club: Kate - Book 1 (2015)
- Secondhand Bride - Book 2
- Bridesmaid for Hire - Book 3
- The Wedding Flight - Book 4
- If the Dress Fits - Book 5

Abigail Dixon: A 1920s Cozy Historical Mystery

- Death of a Flapper - Book 1 (2020) Republished in 2024 as Murder at the Paris Fashion House
- Death at Darrington Hall - Book 2 (2024)

Vampire Knitting Club Series: Paranormal Cozy Mystery

- Tangles and Treasons - Prequel
- The Vampire Knitting Club - Book 1 (2018)
- Stitches and Witches - Book 2
- Crochet and Cauldrons - Book 3
- Stockings and Spells - Book 4
- Purls and Potions - Book 5
- Fair Isle and Fortunes - Book 6
- Lace and Lies - Book 7
- Bobbles and Broomsticks - Book 8
- Popcorn and Poltergeists - Book 9
- Garters and Gargoyles - Book 10
- Diamonds and Daggers - Book 11
- Herringbones and Hexes - Book 12
- Ribbing and Runes - Book 13
- Mosaics and Magic - Book 14 (2022)
- Cables and Conjurers - Book 15 (2024)
- Mazes and Mummies - Book 16 (2026)
- Cat’s Paws and Curses - A Holiday Whodunnit Novella

Vampire Knitting Club: Cornwall: Paranormal Cozy Mystery

- The Vampire Knitting Club: Cornwall - Book 1 (2022)
- Scallops and Sorcerers - Book 2 (2024)

The Great Witches Baking Show Series: Culinary Paranormal Cozy Mystery

- The Great Witches Baking Show - Book 1 (2020)
- Baker’s Coven - Book 2
- A Rolling Scone - Book 3
- A Bundt Instrument - Book 4
- Blood, Sweat and Tiers - Book 5
- Crumbs and Misdemeanors - Book 6
- A Cream of Passion - Book 7
- Cakes and Pains - Book 8
- Whisk and Reward - Book 9
- Gingerdead House - A Holiday Whodunnit Novella

Vampire Book Club Series: Paranormal Women’s Fiction Cozy Mystery

- Crossing the Lines - Prequel
- The Vampire Book Club - Book 1 (2020)
- Chapter and Curse - Book 2 (2020)
- A Spelling Mistake - Book 3 (2020)
- A Poisonous Review - Book 4 (2022)
- In Want of a Knife - Book 5 (2023)

Village Flower Shop Series: Paranormal Cozy Mystery

- Peony Dreadful - Book 1 (2022)
- Karma Camellia - Book 2 (2022)
- Highway to Hellebore - Book 3 (2023)
- Luck of the Iris - Book 4 (2023)
- Game of Thorns - Book 5 (2025)

=== Omnibus ===
- Heaven Scent / Shotgun Nanny (2002) (with Jacqueline Diamond)
- A Hickey for Harriet / A Cradle for Caroline (2003)
- Jingle Bell Rock: He sees you When You're Sleeping / All She Wants for Christmas / Turning up the Heat / Baby, It's Cold Outside / Blue Christmas / Nutcracker Sweet (2003) (with Janelle Denison, Susan Donovan, Lori Foster, Donna Kauffman, Alison Kent)
- It Happened One Christmas (2003) (with Julie McBride and Susan Wiggs)
- Stroke of Midnight (2003) (with Carrie Alexander, Jamie Ann Denton)
- Bad Boys On Board (2003) (with Lori Foster, Donna Kauffman)
- Bad Boys with Expensive Toys (2004) (with MaryJanice Davidson, Karen Kelley)
- Hot and Bothered / Underneath It All (2004) (with Kate Hoffmann)
- Merry Christmas, Baby (2004) (with Susanna Carr, MaryJanice Davidson, Donna Kauffman, Erin McCarthy, Lucy Monroe)
- Bad Boys To Go (2005) (with Lori Foster, Janelle Denison)
- Bayou Bad Boys (2005) (with JoAnn Ross, E C Sheedy)
- Perfect Timing: Those Were the Days / Pistols at Dawn / Time After Time (2006) (with Julie Kenner, Jo Leigh)
- The Night We Met (2007) (with Julie Kenner, Jo Leigh)
