= JoAnn Ross =

American novelist

- Born: July 25; United States
- Occupation: Novelist
- Writing career
- Pen name: JoAnn Robbins, JoAnn Robb, JoAnn Ross
- Period: 1983–present
- Genre: Romance
- Website: www.joannross.com

JoAnn Ross (born July 25 in United States) is an American writer of over 100 romance, romantic suspense, and women’s fiction novels since 1983. She has also written novels as JoAnn Robbins and JoAnn Robb.

She is a member of the Romance Writers of America's Honor Roll of best-selling authors, she's won several awards, including Romantic Times's Career Achievement Awards in both category and contemporary single title.

== Biography ==
JoAnn Ross was born on July 25 in United States. During her childhood, her grandfather McLaughlin told her Irish fairy tales. At 7 years she decided to be writer and she wrote her first novella.

She has written advertising copy extolling the wonders of everything from household appliances to diamonds to tires and for a few years, she wrote for a large metropolitan newspaper. She finally published her first novels in 1983.

She is a member of the Romance Writers of America's Honor Roll of best-selling authors, she's won several awards, including Romantic Times's Career Achievement Awards in both category and contemporary single title. Her books have appeared on both the New York Times and USA Today bestseller lists.

JoAnn lives with her husband and their rescued Siamese cat in the Pacific Northwest.

== Bibliography ==
=== As JoAnn Robbins ===
==== Single novels ====
- Winning Season (1983)

=== As JoAnn Robb ===
==== Single novels ====
- Stardust and Diamonds (1983)
- Sterling Deceptions (1984)
- A Secure Arrangement (1984)
- Touch the Sun (1984)
- Wolfe's Prey (1985)
- A Dangerous Passion (1985)
- Promises to Keep (1985)
- High Stakes Affair (1986)

==== Dreamlover Series ====
1. Dreamlover (1984)
2. Tender Betrayal (1984)

=== As JoAnn Ross ===
==== Single novels ====
- Stormy Courtship (1984)
- Love Thy Neighbor (1985)
- Bait and Switch (1986)
- A Hero at Heart (1986)
- Hot on the Trail (1987)
- Wilde 'n' Wonderful (1988)
- In a Class by Himself (1988)
- Eve's Choice (1988)
- Murphy's Law (1989)
- Class by Himself (1989)
- Secret Sins (1990)
- Private Pleasures (1992)
- Dark Desires (1992)
- Lovestorm (1993)
- Scandals (1994)
- Angel of Desire (1994)
- The Return of Caine O'Halloran (1994)
- Private Passions (1995)
- Legacy of Lies (1995)
- It Happened One Week (1996)
- I Do, I Do... for Now (1996)
- No Regrets (1997)
- Southern Comforts (1997)
- 1-800-Hero (1998)
- Hunk of the Month (1998)
- Mackenzie's Woman (1999)
- Dial a Hero (1999)
- Thirty Nights (2001)
- Blaze (2005)
- Impulse (2006)
- No Safe Place (2007)

==== Duskfire Series ====
1. Duskfire (1985)
2. Risky Pleasure (1985)

==== Lucky Penny Trilogy ====
1. Magic in the Night (1986)
2. Playing for Keeps (1986)
3. Tempting Fate (1987)

==== Tiernan Series ====
1. Without Precedent (1986)
2. Worth Waiting for (1987)
3. Spirit of Love (1988)

==== Montacroix Royal Family Series ====
1. Guarded Moments (1990)
2. The Prince and the Showgirl (1993)
3. The Outlaw (1996)

==== Tangled Series ====
1. Tangled Hearts (1991)
2. Tangled Lives (1991)

==== Rebels and Rogues Series Multi-Author ====
- The Knight in Shining Armor (1992)

==== Castle Mountain Series ====
1. Star-Crossed Lovers (1993)
2. Moonstruck Lovers (1993)

==== Bachelor Arms Series Multi-Author ====
- Never a Bride (1995)
- For Richer or Poorer (1995)
- Three Grooms and a Wedding (1995)

==== Men of Whiskey River Series ====
1. Confessions (1996)
2. Untamed (1996)
3. Wanted! (1996)
4. Ambushed (1996)
5. The Outlaw (1996)

==== Knights of New Orleans Series ====
1. Roarke, the Adventurer (1997)
2. Shayne, the Pretender (1997)
3. Michael, the Defender (1997)

==== Irish Castlelough Trilogy ====
1. A Woman's Heart (1998)
2. Fair Haven (2000)
3. Legends Lake (2001)

==== Coldwater Cove Series ====
1. Homeplace (1999)
2. Far Harbor (2000)

==== The Callahan Brothers Trilogy ====
1. Blue Bayou (2002)
2. River Road (2002)
3. Magnolia Moon (2003)
- The Callahan Brothers Trilogy: Blue Bayou, River Road, Magnolia Moon (omnibus) (2004)
- Callahan Brothers Trilogy: Blue Bayou, River Road, Magnolia Moon (omnibus) (2005)

==== Stewart Sisters Trilogy ====
1. Out of the Mist (2003)
2. Out of the Blue (2004)
3. Out of the Storm (2004)

==== High Risk Series ====
1. Freefall (2008)
2. Crossfire (2008)
3. Shattered (2009)
4. Breakpoint (2009)

==== Shelter Bay Series ====
1. Homecoming (2010)
2. One Summer (2011)
3. On Lavender Lane (2012)
4. Moonshell Beach (2012)
5. Sea Glass Winter (2013)
6. Castaway Cove (2013)

=== Honeymoon Harbor Series ===
1. Herons Landing (2018)
2. Snowfall on Lighthouse Lane (2018)
3. Summer on Mirror Lake (2019)

==== Collections ====
- Homeplace / Far Harbor (2005)

=== Omnibus in collaboration ===
- Western Loving (1993) (with Susan Fox and Barbara Kaye)
- The Waiting Game (1995) (with Jayne Ann Krentz) (Washington / In a Class By Himself)
- The Bodyguard (1995) (with Pamela Bauer and Evelyn Crowe)
- New Year's Resolution: Baby (1996) (with Margot Dalton and Anne Stuart)
- Verdict: Matrimony (1996) (with Sandra Canfield and Bobby Hutchinson)
- Summer Loving (1998) (with Marie Ferrarella, Diane Pershing and Tiffany White)
- Temptations Blaze (1998) (with Heather MacAllister and Elda Minger)
- Perfect Summer (1999) (with Stephanie Bond, Janice Kaiser and Vicki Lewis Thompson)
- Silent Sam's Salvation; A Very Special Delivery; Valentine Hearts and Flowers; Romantic Notions (2000) (with Myrna Temte and Roz Denny)
- Windfall (2003) (with Isabel Sharpe)
- Bayou Bad Boys (2005) (with E.C. Sheedy and Nancy Warren)
- Bad Boys Southern Style (2006) (with Jill Shalvis and E.C. Sheedy)

== Awards ==
- Winner of the Romantic Times Magazine Career Achievement Award for Contemporary Romance

== References and sources ==
- JoAnn Ross's Official Website
