= Sylvia Hyman =

American artist (1917–2012)

- Born: September 9, 1917; Buffalo, New York, U.S.
- Died: December 23, 2012 (aged 95); Nashville, Tennessee, U.S.
- Education: Buffalo State College, Peabody College for Teachers
- Spouses: Maurice Hyman, Arthur Gunzberg
- Children: 2

Sylvia Hyman (September 9, 1917 – December 23, 2012) was an American ceramic artist, art teacher and visual artist. She was known for her lifelike ceramic pieces and sculptures which are included in the collections of museums worldwide. Her trademark pieces, which were fashioned from stoneware or porcelain, often used the artist technique of trompe-l'œil (meaning "deceive the eye" or "fooling the eye" in French) to create the realism of art. Much of Hyman's work featured everyday objects, such as paper, books, or food, realistically crafted from ceramic. She was also the founder of the Tennessee Association of Craft Artists (TACA).

== Biography ==
Hyman was born in Buffalo, New York, in 1917. She received her bachelor's degree in art education in 1938 from the New York State Teachers College at Buffalo (now Buffalo State College). Hyman later obtained a master's degree in art education from Peabody College for Teachers (now known as Peabody College of Vanderbilt University), in 1963 in Nashville, Tennessee. Professionally, Hyman worked as a public school art teacher, as well as a faculty member of Peabody College.

In 1957, after working as a public school teacher for approximately fifteen years, Hyman received some ceramic equipment, which launched her artistic career as a ceramist.

Examples of her work are included in the collections of museums and art collections worldwide including the Smithsonian American Art Museum, the Museum of Decorative Arts in Prague, the Saga Prefectural Museum in Saga, Japan, the Tennessee State Museum in Nashville, and the Renwick Gallery in Washington D.C.

Hyman received recognition for her work. Her awards included a Lifetime Achievement Award in the Craft Arts from the National Museum of Women in the Arts of Washington, D.C., in 1993 and the Tennessee Governor's Award for Lifetime Achievement in the Arts, which she received in 1994. A book of her artwork, The Intriguing Vision of Sylvia Hyman: Trompe l’Oeil Ceramic Artist, edited by Janet Mansfield, was published in 2012.

== Death and legacy ==
Sylvia Hyman died in Nashville, Tennessee, on December 23, 2012, at the age of 95. A public memorial service for Hyman was to be held at The Temple Congregation Ohabai Sholom in Nashville on January 27, 2013. Survivors included her second husband, Arthur Gunzberg, two children, Paul Maurice Hyman and writer Jackie Diamond Hyman and stepson Guy Gunzberg.

Executive Director Susan Edwards of the Frist Center for the Visual Arts, where Hyman held a major exhibition called "Sylvia Hyman: Fictional Clay" in 2007, praised Hyman's legacy in an interview with The Tennessean following her death, telling the newspaper, "There are few ceramists anywhere more revered than Nashville's own, Sylvia Hyman...In her long and productive career, encompassing abstraction and realism, Sylvia showed us the remarkable power of touch and the potential of clay. Her exhibition at the Frist (in 2007) remains one of our most well-received locally." The 2007 exhibition had marked her 90th birthday.
