= Patricia Maxwell =

American novelist

Patricia Anne Ponder Maxwell
- Born: Patricia Anne Ponder; March 9, 1942 (age 84); Goldonna, Louisiana, U.S.
- Occupation: Novelist
- Children: 4
- Writing career
- Pen name: Patricia Maxwell, Elizabeth Trehearne (with Carol Albritton), Patricia Ponder, Maxine Patrick, Jennifer Blake
- Period: 1969 - present
- Genres: Gothic, mystery, suspense, romance
- Website: www.jenniferblake.com

Patricia Maxwell (born Patricia Anne Ponder; March 9, 1942, near Goldonna, Louisiana), is an American writer. A member of the Romance Writers of America Hall of Fame and the Affaire de Coeur Romance Hall of Fame, Maxwell has received numerous awards for her writing. Her first novel in the romance genre, Love's Wild Desire, became a New York Times Bestseller.

Maxwell has published books under five different names. Using her real name, Patricia Maxwell, she wrote Gothic mystery-suspense romances. She wrote one book in collaboration with Carol Albritton that was published under the name Elizabeth Trehearne. Under her maiden name, Patricia Ponder, she wrote a murder mystery and a romantic suspense story. As Maxine Patrick, she wrote contemporary romances, and historical romances. she wrote as Jennifer Blake. Many of her books are set in her native Louisiana.

== Biography ==
=== Early years ===
Maxwell is a seventh generation Louisianan of English, Irish, Welsh, Scots-German, French, and Indigenous descent. She was born in a large farm house in Northern Louisiana. Through her mother, who belonged to a mail order book club, Maxwell was introduced at an early age to adult mysteries, westerns, historical novels, and romances. As a young teenager, she volunteered at the school library.

At age 15, Patricia Ponder married and took her husband's surname of Maxwell, becoming a housewife and mother. She began writing one morning when she was 21, attempting to describe a very vivid dream she'd had that was set in historical Scotland. She took a six-week correspondence course on writing and began practicing as much as she could.

=== Writing career ===
For the next seven years, Maxwell sold various poems, articles, and short stories before selling her first novel manuscript in 1970.

Maxwell's early works, published under her own name, were mystery suspense novels. In the mid-1970s, this type of novel became less popular. Maxwell suddenly had trouble selling new works. After two years of struggling to find another niche, Maxwell was asked to write a proposal for an emerging genre, historical romance. Her first novel in this genre, Love's Wild Desire, became a New York Times Bestseller under the pseudonym Jennifer Blake (so that fans of her previous work would not be confused).

Maxwell has been writing romance and historical novels as Jennifer Blake for over 30 years. The book is often set between 1830 and 1850 and take place in Louisiana.

=== Personal life ===
Maxwell writes for six hours a day, five days a week in her home office, usually completing one book each year. In her spare time, she enjoys collecting antiques, painting, and quilting. Because she is allergic to many chemicals, she and her husband maintain a small organic garden to cultivate their own produce. They also grow antique roses.

After selling her first novel manuscript in 1970, she spent her first check on a greenhouse.

Maxwell and her husband live in Northern Louisiana, with a second home in Colorado. They have four children and several grandchildren.

== Works ==
=== As Patricia Maxwell ===
==== Single novels ====
- The Secret of the Mirror House, 1970
- Stranger at Plantation Inn, 1971
- The Bewitching Grace, 1973
- The Court of the Thorn Tree, 1973
- Dark Masquerade, 1974
- Bride of a Stranger, 1974
- Love's Wild Desire, 1977
- The Notorious Angel, 1977
- Sweet Piracy, 1978
- Night of the Candles, 1978

=== As Elizabeth Trehearne ===
==== Single Novel ====
- Storm at Midnight, 1973

=== As Patricia Ponder ===
==== Single novels ====
- Haven of Fear, 1974
- Murder for Charity, 1974

=== As Maxine Patrick ===
==== Single novels ====
- The Abducted Heart, 1978
- Bayou Bride, 1978
- Snowbound Heart, 1979
- Captive Kisses, 1980
- Love at Sea, 1980
- April of Enchantment, 1981

=== As Jennifer Blake ===
==== Single novels ====
- Tender Betrayal, 1979
- The Storm and the Splendor, 1979
- Golden Fancy, 1980
- Embrace and Conquer, 1981
- Midnight Waltz, 1984
- Surrender in Moonlight, 1984
- Fierce Eden, 1985
- Prisoner of Desire, 1986
- Louisiana Dawn, 1987
- Southern Rapture, 1987
- Perfume of Paradise, 1988
- Love and Smoke, 1989
- Spanish Serenade, 1990
- Joy and Anger, 1991
- Wildest Dreams, 1992
- Arrow to the Heart, 1993
- Shameless, 1994
- Silver-Tongued Devil, 1995
- Tigress, 1996
- Garden of Scandal, 1997

==== Royal Family of Ruthenia series ====
1. Royal Seduction, 1983
2. Royal Passion, 1985

==== Louisiana's Gentlemen Benedict series ====
1. Kane, 1998
2. Luke, 1999
3. Roan, 2000
4. Clay, 2001
5. "Adam" in With a Southern Touch, 2002
6. Wade, 2002

==== Masters at Arms series ====
1. Challenge to Honor, 2005
2. Dawn Encounter, 2006
3. Rogue's Salute, 2007
4. Guarded Heart, 2008
5. Gallant Match, 2009

==== Anthologies in collaboration ====
- "Dream Lover" in A Dream Come True, 1994 (with Georgina Gentry, Shirl Henke, Anita Mills and Becky Lee Weyrich)
- "Besieged Heart" in Secret of the Heart, 1994 (with Madeline Baker, Georgina Gentry, Shirl Henke and Patricia Rice)
- "The Warlock's Daughter" in Star-Dust, 1994
- "Reservations" in Honeymoon Suite, 1995 (with Margaret Brownley, Ruth Jean Dale and Sheryl Lynn)
- "Out of the Dark" in A Purrfect Romance!, 1995 (with Robin Lee Hatcher and Susan Wiggs)
- "Pieces of Dreams" in The Quilting Circle, 1996 (with Jo Anne Cassidy, Joanne Cassity, Christina Cordaire and Linda Shertzer)
- A Vision of Sugarplums in Joyous Season, 1996 (with Olga Bicos, Hannah Howell and Fern Michaels)
- "Love in Three-Quarter Time" in Unmasked, 1997 (with Janet Dailey and Elizabeth Gage)
- "John 'Rip' Peterson" in Southern Gentleman, 1998 (with Emilie Richards)
- With a Southern Touch, 2002 (with Heather Graham and Diana Palmer)
- "Pieces of Dreams" in With Love, 2002 (with Kristin Hannah and Linda Lael Miller)

== Awards ==
- Inducted into Romance Writers of America Hall of Fame
- 1997 Frank Waters Award for Writing Excellence
- 1997 Holt Medallion, Southern Theme, Virginia Romance Writers: SILVER-TONGUED DEVIL
- 1995 "Climbing Rose" Award, North Louisiana Romance Authors
- 1995 Lifetime Honorary Membership, Coeur de Louisiane, Inc. Writers Club
- 1994 Romance Hall of Fame, Affaire de Coeur Magazine
- 1994 Reviewer’s Choice Winner, Affaire de Coeur: SHAMELESS
- 1993-1994 Reviewer’s Choice Certificate of Excellence, Romantic Times: SHAMELESS
- 1992-1993 Reviewer’s Choice Certificate of Excellence, Romantic Times: ARROW TO THE HEART
- 1991-1992 Reviewer’s Choice Certificate of Excellence, Romantic Times: WILDEST DREAMS
- 1988 Keynote Speaker, Romance Writers of America National Conference
- 1988 Honorary Membership, Romance Writers of America
- 1988 Silver Plume Award, Affaire de Coeur: SOUTHERN RAPTURE 1988 Best Colonial Romance, Romantic Times: LOUISIANA DAWN
- 1987 Golden Treasure Award, Lifetime Achievement, Romance Writers of America
- 1987 "Maggie" Award, Georgia Romance Writers: SOUTHERN RAPTURE
- 1987 "Climbing Rose" Award, North Louisiana Romance Authors
- 1985 "Maggie" Award, Georgia Romance Writers: MIDNIGHT WALTZ
- 1985 Historical Romance Author of the Year, Romantic Times

== See also ==
- List of romantic novelists

== References and sources ==
- Patricia Anne Ponder Maxwell's Official Website
- Jennifer Blake at eHarlequin
- Jennifer Blake at Mills & Boon
