= Renee Roszel =

American writer

Renée Roszel
- Born: Tulsa, Oklahoma, U.S.
- Occupation: Novelist
- Children: 2
- Writing career
- Period: 1983–present
- Genre: Romantic novel
- Website: www.reneeroszel.com

Renee Roszel is an American writer who has issued over 40 romance novels since 1983.

== Biography ==
Roszel does not like to study languages or to play music, however, she does like to read. Some of her favorite authors are: Irving Stone, J.D. Salinger, Larry McMurtry and Margaret Mitchell. She also a fan of chocolate and comedy.

She is married to an engineer and has two children. They live in the Midwestern United States.

== Bibliography ==
=== Single novels ===
- Hostage Heart (1983)
- Wild Flight (1984)
- Wind Shadow (1984)
- Another Man's Treasure (1985)
- Nobody's Fool (1986)
- Legendary Lover (1989)
- Another Heaven (1989)
- Unwilling Wife (1991)
- Valentine's Knight (1991)
- Devil to Pay (1992)
- Prince of Delights (1992)
- A Bride for Ransom (1993)
- No More Mr. Nice (1993)
- Dare to Kiss a Cowboy (1994)
- Ghost Whispers (1994)
- Sex, Lies and Leprechauns (1994)
- Make-believe Marriage (1995)
- Brides for Brazen Gulch (1996)
- To Lasso a Lady (1996)
- Getting Over Harry (1996)
- There Goes the Bride (1998)
- Boardroom Bridegroom (1998)
- Gift-wrapped baby (1998)
- The One-week Marriage (1999)
- To Catch a Bride (2001)
- Bride on the Loose (2001)
- Her Hired Husband (2001)
- The Tycoon's Temptation (2002)
- Bridegroom on Her Doorstep (2002)
- Surrender to a Playboy (2003)
- A Bride for the Holidays (2003)
- Just Friends To... Just Married (2005)
- Blue Moon Bride (2006)
- Sex, Lies and Cellulite (2007)

=== The Enchanted Brides Trilogy ===
1. To Marry a Stranger (1997)
2. Married by Mistake! (1997)
3. Her Mistletoe Husband (1998)

=== Baby Boom Series ===
- The Billionaire Daddy (1999)

=== The merits of marriage ===
1. Honeymoon Hitch (2000)
2. Coming Home to Wed (2000)
3. Accidental Fiancee (2001)

=== Omnibus In Collaboration ===
- Cowboy Country (2002) (with Judith Bowen) (The Man from Blue River / To Lasso a Lady)
- Christmas, Kids and Kisses (2006) (with Diana Hamilton and Kate Walker)
