= Dawn Atkins (romantic novelist) =

American novelist

- Occupation: Novelist
- Writing career
- Language: English
- Genre: Romance
- Website: www.dawnatkins.com

Dawn Atkins is an American author of contemporary romance novels.

== Biography ==
Dawn Atkins has been writing since childhood. In the early 1980s she sold the first of her work, several romance short stories which were published by True Love magazine. She then wrote her first romance novel, which was rejected by publishers. For the next 13 years, Atkins did not write. She filled her time teaching second and third graders. Eventually she began rewriting her first novel, which was rejected by several agents in its new form. Atkins kept writing, and her third completed manuscript was published by Kensington Books' Precious Gems line of contemporary category romances. Getting Zack Back was published in July 1998 under the name Daphne Atkeson. Her second novel, Baby Makes Three, was released eighteen months later. Many of her later books have been published by various Harlequin category romance lines, including Temptation and Blaze.

Atkins has been twice nominated for Romantic Times Reviewers' Choice Awards, for Going to Extremes and A Perfect Life.

Atkins maintains a full-time job as a writer. She and her husband, David, have one son.

== Bibliography ==
=== Doing It... Better! series ===
- With His Touch (2006)
- At Her Beck and Call (2007)
- At His Fingertips (2007)

=== Novels ===
- Getting Zach Back (1998)
- Baby Makes Three (2000)
- The Cowboy Fling (2002)
- Lipstick on His Collar (2002)
- Friendly Prsuasion (2003)
- Room But Not Bored! (2003)
- A Perfect Life? (2004)
- Wilde for You (2004)
- Very Truly Sexy (2004)
- Going to Extremes (2005)
- Simply Sex (2005)
- Tease Me (2005)
- Don't Tempt Me... (2006)
- Swept Away (2007)

=== Omnibus ===
- Anything You Can Do...! / Anchor That Man! (2002) (with Darlene Gardner)
- Wedding for One / Tattoo for Two (2003)
- Trick Me, Treat Me / Room...But Not Bored! (2004) (with Leslie Kelly)
- Wilde for You / Best Man in Texas (2004) (with Kristine Rolofson)
- I Got You, Babe / Anchor That Man! (2005) (with Bonnie Tucker)
- Forbidden Fantasies (2006) (with Jo Leigh and Cara Summers)
