= Shirl Henke =

American novelist

- Born: August 18, 1942 (age 84); Missouri
- Education: University of Missouri (BA, MA)
- Occupation: Novelist
- Writing career
- Pen name: Alexa Hunt
- Period: 1986–present
- Genres: romance, thrillers
- Website: www.shirlhenke.com

Shirl Henke (born August 18, 1942) is an American best-selling author of contemporary and historical romance novels. She has eclectic tastes and has written historical, contemporary, western, and regency-themed books. She also writes mystery novels using the pen name Alexa Hunt. Some of her works have been translated into other languages.

== Biography ==
She was born Shirl Nehrt, fifteen years after her next oldest sibling. Her father died while she was in her teens, leaving Henke alone with her mother. Henke entered the University of Missouri immediately after graduating from high school. In her first year at school she met her future husband, Jim Henke, in a shared Spanish class. Although Henke originally planned to become a journalist, she eventually earned a B.A. and an M.A. in history (both from the University of Missouri). After her graduation, she worked as a cashier for a loan company, a public welfare caseworker, the assistant circulation manager for a small newspaper, and an administrator of a federal information program for the elderly. After earning a job at the university in Ohio where her husband was a tenured professor, for fifteen years Henke taught history, gerontology, sociology, proposal writing for social service agencies, freshman composition, and remedial reading. Henke finally sold her first novel in 1986. Two years later, she left her teaching career to become a full-time writer. In her Henke has made the USA Today bestseller list and the Waldenbooks and B. Dalton Bestsellers list 10 times each. Her husband took early retirement in order to assist her burgeoning writing career.

Henke lives in St. Louis, Missouri, where she recently took a landscaping design course at the Missouri Botanical Garden and has designed the landscaping for her yard. She and her husband Jim, a retired professor of English, have a son, Matt.

Henke is a member of the Authors Guild, Romance Writers of America, Missouri Romance Writers, Sisters in Crime, Novelists Inc., and International Thriller Writers.

== Bibliography ==
=== Romance ===
==== Old California Couplet ====
- Golden Lady (1986)
- Love Unwilling (1987)

==== Texas Trilogy ====
- Cactus Flower (1988)
- Moon Flower (1989)
- Night Flower (1990)

==== Discovery Duet ====
- Paradise And More (1991)
- Return to Paradise (1992)

==== Santa Fe Trilogy ====
- Night Wind's Woman (1991)
- White Apache's Woman (1993)
- Deep As the Rivers (1997)

==== Colorado Couplet ====
- Terms of Love (1992)
- Terms of Surrender (1993)

==== Blackthorne ====
- Love a Rebel, Love a Rogue (1994)
- Wicked Angel (2001)
- Wanton Angel (2002)

==== American Lord ====
- Yankee Earl (2003)
- Rebel Baron (2004)
- Texas Viscount (2004)
- Shawnee Lord (2018)

==== Novels ====
- Capture the Sun (1988)
- Summer Has No Name (1990)
- Bouquet (1994)
- A Fire in the Blood (1994)
- Bride of Fortune (1996)
- Broken Vows (1998)
- The Endless Sky (1998)
- Sundancer (1999)
- McCrory's Lady (2002)
- Finders Keepers (2005)
- Sneak and Rescue (2006)
- The River Nymph (2008)
- Pale Moon Stalker (2008)
- Chosen Woman (2009)
- Love Lessons at Midnight (TBA)

==== Omnibus ====
- The Topaz Man Presents: Presents a Dream Come True (1994) (with Jennifer Blake, Georgina Gentry, Anita Mills and Becky Lee Weyrich)
- Secrets of the Heart (1994) (with Madeline Baker, Jennifer Blake, Georgina Gentry and Patricia Rice)
- Unwrapped (2004) (with Nina Bangs, Claudia Dain)
- Captive's Return / Finders Keepers (2005) (with Catherine Mann)

=== Thrillers (as Alexa Hunt) ===
- Corrupts Absolutely (2005)
- Homeland Security (2007)
