= Claudia Jameson =

Romance author

- Occupation: Novelist
- Writing career
- Pen name: Claudia Jameson
- Period: 1981–1991
- Genre: Romantic novel

Claudia Jameson was a writer of romance novels from 1981 to 1991.

== Bibliography ==
=== Single novels ===
- Escape to Love (1981)
- Lesson in Love (1982)
- The Melting Heart (1983)
- Never Say Never (1983)
- Yours Faithfully (1983)
- For Practical Reasons (1983)
- Gentle Persuasion (1983)
- Dawn of a New Day (1984)
- The Frenchman's Kiss (1984)
- A Time to Grow (1984)
- The Scorpio Man (1985)
- Roses, Always Roses (1985)
- Man in Room 12 (1985)
- One Dream Only (1985)
- To Speak of Love (1986)
- Adam's Law (1986)
- Immune to Love (1986)
- An Engagement Is Announced (1987)
- A Man of Contrasts (1987)
- Playing Safe (1988)
- Unconditional Love (1988)
- That Certain Yearning (1989)
- A Second Loving (1990)
- An Answer from the Heart (1990)
- A Love That Endures (1991)
- A Second Chance (1991)
