= Penguin Group (USA) Inc. v. American Buddha =

American legal case

- Court: United States Court of Appeals for the Second Circuit
- Full case name: Penguin Group (USA) Inc. v. American Buddha
- Argued: January 7 2010
- Decided: May 12 2011
- Citation: 640 F.3d 497

Holding
- Vacated United States District Court's dismissal and remanded the case for further proceedings

Court membership
- Judges sitting: Robert D. Sack, Robert A. Katzmann, Denny Chin

Case opinions
- Per curiam

Penguin Group (USA) Inc. v. American Buddha, 640 F.3d 497 (2d Cir. 2011), was a case in which United States Court of Appeals for the Second Circuit reversed the decision of the United States District Court for the Southern District of New York, which had granted American Buddha's motion to dismiss Penguin Group (USA) Inc. ("Penguin")'s copyright infringement action for lack of personal jurisdiction. The appellate court remanded the case for further proceedings.

== Background ==
American Buddha is an Oregon-based nonprofit organization represented by lawyer Charles Carreon and run by his wife Tara Lyn Carreon. American Buddha has uploaded complete copies of books and other media onto American Buddha's online library that is accessible by its 50,000 members free of charge. Four of those books (Note: The four works at issue are Oil! by Upton Sinclair, It Can't Happen Here by Sinclair Lewis, The Golden Ass by Apuleius translated by E.J. Kenney, and On the Nature of the Universe by Lucretius translated by R.E. Latham.) are copyrighted works owned by New York City-based book publisher Penguin. Penguin brought a copyright infringement action against American Buddha in the United States District Court for the Southern District of New York, alleging that American Buddha infringed on Penguin's copyrights in those four works. Because American Buddha was an out-of-state defendant, Penguin asserted personal jurisdiction according to New York's Long-Arm Statute, N.Y. C.P.L.R.§ 302(a)(3)(ii), which provides:

"[A] court may exercise personal jurisdiction over any non-domiciliary ... who ... commits a tortious act without the state causing injury to person or property within the state, ... if he ... expects or should reasonably expect the act to have consequences in the state and derives substantial revenue from interstate or international commerce. ...

To establish jurisdiction under N.Y. C.P.L.R.§ 302(a)(3)(ii), Penguin needed to demonstrate that:

"(1) the defendant's tortious act was committed outside New York, (2) the cause of action arose from that act, (3) the tortious act caused an injury to a person or property in New York, (4) the defendant expected or should reasonably have expected that his or her action would have consequences in New York, and (5) the defendant derives substantial revenue from interstate or international commerce.

=== Interpretation of N.Y. C.P.L.R.§ 302(a)(3)(ii) ===
It is well-established that suffering economic damages in New York is insufficient to establish a "direct" injury in New York under N.Y. C.P.L.R.§ 302(a)(3). Moreover, N.Y. C.P.L.R.§ 302(a)(3) is not satisfied when a plaintiff suffers remote injuries such as lost profits within New York only because the plaintiff is doing business in New York. Due to the above two reasons, some New York courts have concluded that the situs of injury is where the actions associated with the injury take place. However, in cases where "the plaintiff had additional ties to the State, such as the presence of the trade secrets and the threatened loss of customers here", some New York courts have held that situs of injury is the place where plaintiff is located.

== Opinion of the District Court ==
The critical question for the district court, in deciding whether it had personal jurisdiction over American Buddha, was to decide where the alleged infringement happened. Although the Internet was a complicating factor in this case, from the court's point of view, it did not play a role in determining the situs of injury because only copyright infringement by American Buddha was alleged, not the downloading of the copied material by any individual who could be located anywhere, including New York. The district court "was ultimately persuaded by a line of cases recognizing 'the well-established principle requiring a direct injury in New York' and rejecting jurisdiction based on purely derivative economic injury suffered in-state solely because of the location of the plaintiff's business in-state." Thus, the court decided that the business was lost through the copying of the copyrighted works by American Buddha, in Arizona or Oregon (where American Buddha's servers are located), and not in New York, where Penguin is headquartered.

== Opinion of the Court of Appeals ==
Penguin appealed to the United States Court of Appeals for the Second Circuit who then faced the question, "whether, for the purposes of New York's Long-Arm Statute, the situs of injury in copyright infringement cases is the location of the infringing conduct or the location of the plaintiff and, perhaps, the copyright."

=== Question certified by the Second Circuit ===
In this appeal, the main question was how New York's personal jurisdiction statute, N.Y. C.P.L.R.§ 302, applied. More specifically, only the third requirement of § 302(a)(3)(ii) was in dispute: "whether American Buddha's allegedly copyright-infringing conduct in Oregon or Arizona cause the requisite injury in New York." Thus, in deciding whether a New York court had jurisdiction to hear this case, given that there was no binding case law as to "what the situs of injury is in an intellectual property case," the Second Circuit certificated a question to the New York Court of Appeals: "In copyright infringement cases, is the situs of injury for the purposes of determining long-arm jurisdiction ... the location of the infringing action or the residence or location of the principal place of business of the copyright holder?"

The Second Circuit also pointed out that the fact that infringement in this case occurred through the media of the Internet and an online library, is a relevant factor that should be taken into consideration, due to the speed and ease with which the Internet may allow out of state actions to cause injury to copyright holders resident in New York.

=== Question rephrased and answered by New York Court of Appeals ===
The New York Court of Appeals narrowed and reformulated the question to: "In copyright infringement cases involving the uploading of a copyrighted printed literary work onto the Internet, is the situs of injury for purposes of determining long-arm jurisdiction under N.Y. C.P.L.R. § 302(a)(3)(ii) the location of the infringing action or the residence or location of the principal place of business of the copyright holder?" The court issued its answer, holding that the situs of injury in this case was New York, the location of the copyright holder's principal place of business, reasoning that the location of infringement is a less important matter for cases that happen on the Internet since any material, no matter from where it is uploaded onto the Internet, becomes immediately available to anyone with Internet access.

The New York Court of Appeals clarified that the consequence of unlawful uploading of the four copyrighted books is the instantaneous availability of those works on American Buddha's Web sites for anyone, in New York or elsewhere, with an Internet connection to read. Therefore, the injury caused to Penguin by American Buddha could not be associated with a single location and is dispersed throughout the country and perhaps the world.

The second critical factor that the New York Court of Appeals took into consideration in determining New York as the situs of injury, is a unique bundle of rights granted by the statute to copyright owners, which implies overarching "right to exclude others from using his property".

=== Decision of the Second Circuit ===
Having received this response from the New York Court of Appeals that situs of injury was New York, the Second Circuit vacated the district court's earlier dismissal, and remanded the case for further proceedings, including for the district court, to consider the remaining four factors for personal jurisdiction under the long-arm statute, N.Y. C.P.L.R.§ 302(a)(3)(ii).

== Impact ==
The holding of this case expanded the jurisdiction in New York courts over copyrighted materials distributed over Internet. Thus, if anyone has infringed a copyrighted work whose owner resides in or whose principal place of business is in New York, there is now an increased likelihood that jurisdiction will be in a New York court, even if the alleged infringing activities take place outside the State. Moreover, although this holding involves copyright infringement over the Internet, it is possible that it could contribute to "an expansion of jurisdiction for other types of intellectual property cases."

== See also ==
- Irving v Penguin Books and Lipstadt
- R v Penguin Books Ltd.
