= Ruth Jean Dale =

American writer of romance novels

Betty Lee Duran
- Born: March 10, 1939; Newton County, Missouri, U.S.
- Died: September 11, 2022 (aged 83); Neosho, Missouri, U.S.
- Occupations: Newspaper reporter, novelist
- Spouse: Roy Gilbert Duran
- Children: 4
- Writing career
- Pen name: Ruth Jean Dale, Lee Duran
- Period: 1988–2022
- Genre: Romance Mystery Humor

Betty Lee Duran (March 10, 1939 – September 11, 2022) was an American writer of romance novels. She started writing as Ruth Jean Dale, and now then wrote as Lee Duran.

Ruth Jean Dale's books have been translated into many foreign languages, including French, Spanish, German, Polish, Greek, Italian, Russian and Chinese. She has made frequent appearances on romance best seller lists, and was nominated a "Top Ten Favorite Author" by Affaire de Coeur magazine.

Duran retired temporarily in 2000 after her husband suffered a stroke. After his death in 2008, she returned to writing under her own name: Lee Duran.

Duran died on September 11, 2022.

== Biography ==
Betty Lee Duran was born in the Ozark Mountains, Missouri. She traveled throughout the U.S. during her childhood. She studied Journalism in her native Missouri. She served in the U.S. Navy, and married a U.S. Marine in 1960. She worked as a newspaper reporter in California, with her husband. In 1984, she suffered a brain aneurysm, followed by three brain surgeries.

Duran sold her first novel as Ruth Jean Dale on July 8, 1988. She also collaborated with her friend, the writer Margaret Brownley. They sold a two-year story projection to the CBS soap, As The World Turns. Duran retired temporarily in 2000 after her husband suffered a stroke. Following his death in 2008, she returned to writing under her own name: Lee Duran.

== Bibliography ==
=== As Ruth Jean Dale ===
==== Stand alone novels ====
- Extra! Extra! (1989)
- Together Again (1990)
- One More Chance (1990)
- A Million Reasons Why (1992)
- Society Page (1995)
- The Seven-Year Itch (1996)
- One in a Million (1999)
- Parents Wanted! (1999)
- Fiance Wanted! (2000)

==== The Taggarts of Texas! Saga ====
1. Legend! (1993)
2. Fireworks! (1992)
3. The Red-Blooded Yankee! (1992)
4. Showdown! (1993)
5. Hitched! (2000)

==== The Camerons of Colorado Saga ====
1. Kids, Critters and Cupid (1996)
2. The Cupid Conspiracy (1996)
3. The Cupid Chronicles (1996)
4. Cupid's Revenge (1998)

==== Runaway Wedding Series ====
1. Runaway Wedding (1996)
2. A Simple Texas Wedding (1996)
3. Runaway Honeymoon (1996)

==== Gone to Texas! Series ====
1. The Wrangler's Woman (2000)
2. Almost a Cowboy (2000)
3. The Cowgirl's Man (2000)

==== Rebels & Rogues Series Multi-Author ====
- The Red-Blooded Yankee! (1992)

==== Back To The Ranch Series Multi-Author ====
- Wild Horses! (1994)

==== Matchmaking Moms Series Multi-Author ====
- A Royal Pain (1997)

==== Simply the Best Series Multi-Author ====
- Breakfast in Bed (1997)

==== Whirlwind Weddings Series Multi-Author ====
- Dash to the Altar (1998)

==== Hero for Hire Series Multi-Author ====
- A Private Eyeful (1998)

==== Texas Grooms Wanted! Series Multi-Author ====
- Bachelor Available! (1998)

==== The Lyon Legacy Series Multi-Author ====
- The Lyon Legacy (1999) (with Peg Sutherland and Roz Denny Fox)
- Family Secrets (1999)

==== Bachelor Auction Series Multi-Author ====
- Shane's Last Stand (2000)

==== A Walk Down the Aisle: Wedding Celebration Series Multi-Author ====
- Trading Places (2001)

==== Collections ====
- Something About Ewe / Purrfect Man (2001)

==== Omnibus in collaboration ====
- Friends, Families, Lovers (1993) (with Kathleen Eagle and Sandra Kitt)
- Honeymoon Suite (1995) (with Jennifer Blake, Margaret Brownley and Sheryl Lynn)
- Flower Girls (1996) (with Janet Dailey, Beverly Beaver and Margaret Brownley)
- Bridal Showers (1998) (with Jule McBride and Kate Hoffmann)
- One in a Million / Love, Texas Style (1999) (with Kimberly Raye)

=== As Lee Duran ===
==== Single novels in collaboration ====
- Spittin' Image (2001) (with Margaret Brownley)

==== Single novels ====
- Meant For Each Other (2008)
