= Bethany Campbell =

American novelist (1941–2022)

- Born: Sally Lea Bostwick; April 27, 1941; Omaha, Nebraska, U.S.
- Died: March 26, 2022 (aged 80)
- Education: Wayne State Teachers College (BA); University of Arkansas (MA); Northern Illinois University (PhD)
- Occupation: Novelist
- Writing career
- Pen name: Sally Lea McCluskey, Lisa Harris
- Period: 1984–2022
- Genre: Romance
- Notable works: Flirtation River, Every Kind of Heaven, See How They Run
- Notable awards: Golden Medallion – Traditional Romance; 1989 Flirtation River RITA award – Traditional Romance; 1992 Every Kind of Heaven RITA award – Romantic Suspense; 1997 See How They Run
- Website: www.bethanycampbell.com

Sally Lea McCluskey (née Bostwick; April 27, 1941 – March 26, 2022), known by her pen names Bethany Campbell and Lisa Harris, was an American writer of romance novels.

== Biography ==
Sally McCluskey was born on April 27, 1941, in Omaha, Nebraska. She received a B.A. from Wayne State Teachers College, an M.A. in English from the University of Arkansas, and a Ph.D. in English literature from Northern Illinois University, where she met her future husband, Dan Borengasser, a fellow graduate student.

After graduation, she taught at her alma mater and later at Eastern Illinois University. She has also worked on a freelance basis as a writer for several greeting card companies. She published her first romance novel in 1984. She has received three Romance Writers of America RITA Awards, three Romantic Times Reviewer Awards, a Maggie Award, and the Daphne du Maurier Award of Excellence. She died on March 26, 2022, at the age of 80.

== Bibliography ==
=== As Bethany Campbell ===
==== Single novels ====
- After the Stars Fall, 1985
- A Thousand Roses, 1986
- Only a Woman, 1986
- Heartland, 1987
- Pros and Cons, 1987
- Sea Promise, 1987
- The Long Way Home, 1987
- Flirtation River, 1988
- The Diamond Trap, 1988
- The Lost Moon Flower, 1989
- The Snow Garden, 1989
- The Roses of Constant, 1989
- Dead Opposites, 1990
- Heart of the Sun, 1990
- The Ends of the Earth, 1990
- Dancing Sky, 1990
- Every Kind of Heaven, 1991
- Every Woman's Dream, 1991
- The Cloud Holders, 1991
- Spellbinder, 1992
- Child's Play, 1992
- Sand Dollar, 1992
- Only Make Believe, 1992
- Add a Little Spice, 1993
- The Lady and the Tomcat, 1993
- The Man Who Came for Christmas, 1993
- Amarillo by Morning, 1993
- The Thunder Rolls, 1993
- Rhinestone Cowboy, 1994
- Gentle on My Mind, 1994
- Lonestar State of Mind, 1995
- Don't Talk to Strangers, 1996
- See How They Run, 1996
- Hear No Evil, 1998
- The Guardian, 1999
- P.S. Love You Madly, 2000
- Whose Little Girl Are You?, 2000
- The Baby Gift, 2002
- A Little Town in Texas, 2003
- Home to Texas, 2004
- Wild Horses, 2005

==== Anthologies in collaboration ====
- "Say It with Flowers" in With This Ring, 1991
- Always and Forever, 1995 (with Jasmine Cresswell and Debbie Macomber)
- "I'll Take Texas" in Return to Crystal Creek, 2002
- One True Secret/Full House, 2004 (with Nadia Nichols)
- Baby, It's Cold Outside/Family Doctor/Baby Gift, 2004 (with Bobby Hutchinson and Kristine Rolofson)

=== As Lisa Harris ===
==== Single novels ====
- I Will Find You!, 1994
- Undercurrent, 1994
- Trouble in Paradise, 1994
- The Tempting, 1995
- A Man from Oklahoma, 1996

== Awards ==
Awards for Bethany Campbell
Year	Nominated work	Category	Award	Result	Notes	Ref.
1989	Flirtation River	Traditional Romance	Romance Writers of America Golden Medallion	Won		
1992	Every Kind of Heaven	Traditional Romance	Romance Writers of America RITA Award	Won		
1997	See How They Run	Romantic Suspense	Romance Writers of America RITA Award	Won		
