= Heather MacAllister =

American novelist

Heather W. MacAllister
- Born: Texas, U.S.
- Occupation: Novelist
- Writing career
- Pen name: Heather Allison, Heather MacAllister
- Period: 1989–present
- Genre: Romantic novel
- Website: www.heathermacallister.com

Heather W. MacAllister (born Texas, United States) is a writer of over 40 romance novels since 1990, principally as Heather MacAllister. She has also signed her novels as Heather Allison.

Her award-winning romance novels have been translated into 25 languages and published in dozens of countries.

== Biography ==
MacAllister was born in Texas and is married to her high-school sweetheart. She became addicted to romance novels in college, yet still managed to graduate and become a music teacher. She began to write while their children grew. She sold her first novel in December 1989.

She lives with her husband and their children in Texas.

== Bibliography ==
=== As Heather Allison ===
==== Single novels ====
- Deck The Halls (1990)
- Pulse Points (1991)
- Jack Of Hearts (1992)
- Ivy's League (1993)
- The Santa Sleuth (1994)
- Counterfeit Cowgirl (1994)
- Undercover Lover (1995)
- Temporary Texan (1996)
- His Cinderella Bride (1996)
- Marry Me (1997)
- Haunted Spouse (1997)
- Marry In Haste (1997)

==== Collections ====
- 3 Titles By Heather Allison; Marry Me / Undercover Lover / Deck the Halls (2001)

=== As Heather MacAllister ===
==== Proyect: Belden Series ====
1. Jilt Trip (1995)
2. Bedded Bliss (1996)

==== Wrong Bed Series Multi-Author ====
1. Bedded Bliss (1996)

==== Single novels ====
- Christmas Male (1996)
- Bride Overboard (1997)
- Long Southern Nights (1997)
- Manhunting in Memphis (1998)
- Mr. December (1998)
- The Boss and the Plain Jayne Bride (1999)
- Indomptable Sirene (1999)
- Moonlighting (2000)
- Personal Relations (2001)
- How to Be the Perfect Girlfriend (2004)
- Never Say Never (2005)
- Lone Star Santa (2006)
- Undressed (2009)
- A Man for All Seasons (2010)
- Tall, Dark & Restless (2012)

==== Texas Grooms Wanted Series ====
- Hand-Picked Husband (1998)

==== Bachelor Territory Series Multi-Author ====
- The Bachelor and the Babies (1998)

==== Bachelors and Babies Series Multi-Author ====
- The Good, the Bad and the Cuddly (1999)

==== Bachelor Auction Series Multi-Author ====
- The Rancher and the Rich Girl (1999)

==== Project: Pregnancy Series ====
1. The Paternity Plan (2000)
2. The Motherhood Campaign (2000)

==== Cooper's Corner Series Multi-Author ====
- After Darke (2002)

==== Single In The City Series Multi-Author ====
- Tempted in Texas (2002)
- Skirting the Issue (2002)
- Male Call (2003)

==== Spirits are Willing Series ====
- Can't Buy Me Love (2004)

==== 24 Hours the Wedding Series Multi-Author ====
- Falling for You: 24 Hours (2005)

==== Omnibus in collaboration ====
- Temptations Blaze (1998) (with Elda Minger and JoAnn Ross)
- Escapade (2000) (with Muriel Jensen, Kelsey Roberts and Deborah Simmons) (Mommy On Board, Unspoken Confessions, Bride Overboard, the Squire's Daughter)
- Deck the Halls (2000) (with Margot Early)
- Home on the Range (2001) (with Margot Early) (Christmas Male / The Truth about Cowboys)
- Tyler Brides (2001) (with Jacqueline Diamond and Kristine Rolofson)
- Cut to the Chase / How to be the Perfect Girlfriend (2004) (with Julie Kistler)
- Can't Buy Me Love / I Shocked the Sheriff (2004) (with Mara Fox)
- Good Night, Gracie / Never Say Never (2005) (with Kristin Gabriel)
- Bootcamp (2006) (with Leslie Kelly and Cindi Myers)

== References and sources ==
- Heather MacAllister's Official Website
- Heather MacAllister at eHarlequin
- Heather MacAllister at Mills & Boon's
- Heather MacAllister's Webpage at Fantastic Fiction
