= Jasmine Cresswell =

British novelist

Jasmine Rosemary Cresswell
- Born: 1941 (age 84–85); Wales
- Occupation: novelist
- Writing career
- Pen name: Jasmine Cresswell, Jasmine Craig
- Period: 1980–present
- Genres: romantic suspense, category romance, contemporary romance, historical romance
- Website: www.jasminecresswell.com

Jasmine Rosemary Cresswell (born 1941 in Wales) is a British author of over 50 romance novels as Jasmine Cresswell and Jasmine Craig.

== Biography ==
Jasmine Rosemary Cresswell was born in Wales and educated in London. After graduating early from high school, Cresswell received a diploma in technical French and German from the Lycée Français Charles de Gaulle in London. She then joined the British Foreign office and worked for the British Embassy in Rio de Janeiro, where she met her husband, Malcolm Candlish. The two have lived all over the world, including Australia, Canada, and the United States.

Cresswell received a bachelor's degree in history and philosophy from Melbourne University, a degree in history from Macquarie University, and a master's degree in history and archival administration from Case Western Reserve University. Cresswell began writing in 1975, and has more than 9 million copies of her books in print. She has also written romances under the name Jasmine Craig.

Cresswell has served as the editor of the Romance Writer's Report (the national journal of the Romance Writers of America), as president of Rocky Mountain Fiction Writers, and is a founder and former president of Novelists, Inc. Cresswell is also a member of England's Romance Novelists Association and the Authors' Guild of America.

Cresswell and her husband currently live in Sarasota, Florida, and Evergreen, Colorado. They have four children and numerous grandchildren.

== Awards ==
- Colorado Authors' League Award for Best Paperback Novel of the Year
- Romance Writers of America Golden Rose Award
- USA Today Bestsellers List
- two-time Romantic Times Reviewers' Choice Award nominee
- two-time winner of Rocky Mountain Fiction Writer of the Year
- Romance Writers of America's Golden Medallion Award nominee

== Bibliography ==
=== As Jasmine Cresswell ===
==== Romantic Suspense ====
- Final Justice, 2005
- Full Pursuit, 2004
- The DeWilde Affair, 2004
- Private Eyes, 2004
- Decoy, 2004
- Colorado Confidential, 2003
- Dead Ringer, 2003
- Veils of Deceit (anthology including Free Fall), 2003
- The Trouble With Love (anthology including The Perfect Bride), 2003
- Everybody's Talking (anthology including Edge of Eternity), 2003
- The Third Wife, 2002
- The Conspiracy, 2001
- The Refuge, 2000
- The Inheritance, 2000
- The Disappearance, 1999
- The Daughter, 1998
- Secret Sins, 1997
- Charades, 1996
- No Sin Too Great, 1996
- Chase the Past, 1995
- Desires and Deceptions, 1995
- Edge of Eternity, 1994
- Keeping Secrets, 1993
- Nowhere to Hide, 1992
- House Guest, 1992
- Charades, 1989
- Free Fall, 1989
- Undercover, 1986

==== Contemporary Romances ====
- Trueblood Texas: His Brother's Fiancee, 2001
- Delta Justice, 1997
- He Said, She Said, 1997
- I Do, Again, 1997
- Shattered Vows, 1996
- Midnight Fantasy, 1996
- Forgotten Marriage, 1996
- The Substitute Bride, 1996
- The Rossiter Arrangement, 1996
- Marriage on the Run, 1994
- The Perfect Bride, 1993
- Love for Hire, 1992
- Hunter's Prey, 1986
- Mixed Doubles, 1984

==== Historical Romances ====
- Prince of the Night, 1997
- Timeless, 1994
- To Catch the Wind, 1993
- Empire of the Heart, 1993
- The Devil's Envoy, 1992
- The Moreton Scandal, 1986
- Traitor's Heir, 1984
- Lord Rutherford's Affair, 1984
- The Princess, 1982
- Blackwood Bride, 1982
- Lord Carresford's Mistress, 1982
- The Reluctant Viscountess, 1981
- The Danewood Legacy, 1981
- Tarrisbroke Hall, 1981
- Caroline, 1980
- The Abducted Heiress, 1980

=== As Jasmine Craig ===
==== Romances ====
- Empire of the Heart, 1989
- Knave of Hearts (Second Chance at Love, No 446), 1988
- The Devil's Envoy, 1988
- For Love of Christy (Second Chance at Love, No 396), 1987
- One Step to Paradise (Second Chance at Love, No 318), 1986
- Master Touch (Second Chance at Love, No 274), 1985
- Dear Adam (Second Chance at Love, No 243), 1985
- Under Cover of Night, 1984
- Surprised by Love (Second Chance at Love), 1984
- Refuge in His Arms (Second Chance at Love), 1984
- Imprisoned Heart, 1983
- Tender Triumph (Second Chance at Love), 1983
- Runaway Love, 1982
- Stormy Reunion (Second Chance at Love), 1982
