= Catherine Mann =

American novelist

- Education: College of Charleston; University of North Carolina at Greensboro
- Occupation: Author
- Writing career
- Genre: Romance
- Notable work: Taking Cover
- Notable awards: RITA award – Long Contemporary Romance; 2003 Taking Cover
- Website: www.catherinemann.com

Catherine Mann is an American author of romance fiction.

She has published numerous books with Berkley, Sourcebooks, and Harlequin Desire. She is a winner of a Romance Writers of America RITA Award.

Mann holds a master's degree in Theater from UNC-Greensboro and a bachelor's degree in Fine Arts from the College of Charleston.

== Awards and reception ==
- 2003 - Romance Writers of America RITA Award, Long Contemporary Romance – Taking Cover

Mann has also won a Romantic Times Reviewer's Choice Award, a Booksellers' Best Award, and celebrated six RITA Award finals.
