= Jill Shalvis =

American novelist

- Born: United States
- Occupation: Novelist
- Writing career
- Pen name: Jill Sheldon
- Period: 1996–present
- Genre: Romance
- Website: www.jillshalvis.com

Jill Shalvis is an American author of contemporary romance novels, including the Lucky Harbor series.

== Biography ==
Shalvis, who has also written under the pseudonym Jill Sheldon, published her first novel in 1999. Her books have made the New York Times Bestseller List. She has won numerous awards, including the Romance Writers of America's RITA Award for Simply Irresistible, three National Readers' Choice Awards, and the RT Book Reviews Career Achievement Award. Shalvis lives with her husband and their three children near Lake Tahoe, California.

== Bibliography ==
=== Animal Magnetism Series ===
1. Animal Magnetism (2011)
2. Animal Attraction (2011)
3. Rescue My Heart (2012)
4. Rumor Has It (2013)
5. Then Came You (2014)
6. Still the One (2015)
7. All I Want (2015)

=== Cedar Ridge Series ===
Sources:

1. Second Chance Summer (2015)
2. My Kind of Wonderful (2015)
3. Nobody but You (2016)

=== Lucky Harbor Series ===
Sources:

1. Simply Irresistible (2010)
2. The Sweetest Thing (2011)
3. Head Over Heels (2011)
4. Lucky in Love (2012)
5. At Last (2012)
6. Forever and a Day (2012)
7. It Had to Be You (2013)
8. Always on My Mind (2013)
9. Once in a Lifetime (2014)
10. It's in His Kiss (2014)
11. He's So Fine (2014)
12. One in a Million (2014)

- Heating Up the Kitchen: Recipes with Love from Lucky Harbor (2011), a companion e-book to The Sweetest Thing
- "Kissing Santa Claus" (2011), a holiday novella set in Lucky Harbor (found in the Small Town Christmas anthology)
- Christmas in Lucky Harbor (2011), a 2-in-1 reissue of Simply Irresistible and The Sweetest Thing
- Under the Mistletoe (2012), a holiday novella set in Lucky Harbor
- "Dream a Little Dream" (2013), a holiday novella set in Lucky Harbor (found in the A Christmas to Remember anthology)
- Merry Christmas, Baby (2014), a holiday novella set in Lucky Harbor

=== The Wilder Series ===
1. Instant Attraction (2009)
2. Instant Gratification (2009)
3. Instant Temptation (2010)

=== Pacific Heat Baseball Series ===
Sources:

1. Double Play (2009)
2. Slow Heat (2010)

=== Sky High Air Series ===
1. Smart and Sexy (2007)
2. Strong and Sexy (2007)
3. Superb and Sexy (2008)

=== American Heroes: The Firefighters Series ===
1. Flashpoint (2008)
2. Flashback (2008)
3. "All He Wants for Christmas" (2008), a holiday American Heroes novella (found in the Heating Up the Holidays anthology)

=== Other Firefighter Novels ===
- White Heat (2004)
- Blue Flame (2004)
- Seeing Red (2005)

=== Other Novellas ===
- "Perilous Waters" (2005), a novella (found in the Men of Courage II anthology)
- "Nothing to Lose" (2005), a novella (found in the Dare Me anthology)
- "Captivated" (2005) is a novella (found in the Beach Blanket Bad Boys anthology)
- "Baring It All" (2005), a novella (found in the Velvet, Leather & Lace anthology)
- "Ms. Humbug" (2005), a holiday novella (found in The Night Before Christmas anthology)
- "Fall From Grace" (2006), a novella (found in the Bad Boys Southern Style anthology)
- "Together Again?" (2007), a novella (found in the Jinxed! anthology)
- "Finding Mr. Right" (2008), a holiday novella (found in the To All a Good Night anthology)
- "Bah Handsome!" (2009), a holiday novella (found in the Kissing Santa Claus anthology)

=== Other Single Titles ===
- Seduce Me (2004)
- Get a Clue (2005)
- Her Sexiest Mistake (2005)
- Room Service (2006), a Harlequin Blaze in the Room Service series
- Aussie Rules (2006)
- Just Try Me... (2006)
- Out of This World (2006)
- Shadow Hawk (2007)
- The Trouble with Paradise (2007)
- Storm Watch (2009)
- Born on the 4th Of July (2010)
- Time Out (2012)
- The Summer Deal (2020)
- The Family You Make (2022)

=== Wrong Bed Series Multi-Author ===
- Out of the Blue (2000)
- Her Perfect Stranger (2002)

=== American Heroes Series (Multi-Author) ===
Sources:

- Luke (2003)
- Free Fall (2005)
- The Heat Is On (2010)

=== South Village Singles Series ===
1. Roughing It with Ryan (2003)
2. Tangling with Ty (2003)
3. Messing with Mac (2003)
