= Lori Foster =

American novelist

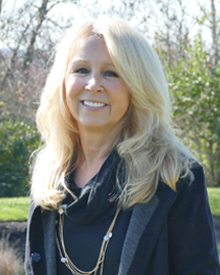
- Born: United States
- Occupation: Novelist
- Writing career
- Pen name: Lori Foster; L.L. Foster
- Language: English
- Period: 1996–present
- Genres: Romance, suspense, urban fantasy
- Notable awards: 2001 Romantic Times “Career Achievement Award” for Series Romantic Fantasy. 2005 Romantic Times “Career Achievement Award” for Contemporary Romance.
- Website: lorifoster.com

Lori Foster is an American romance novelist. She also writes urban fantasy novels under the name L.L. Foster. Since publishing her first book in 1996, Foster has become a USA Today, Publishers Weekly, and The New York Times bestselling author. She has published through a variety of houses, but is currently with Harlequin.
