= Untamed (Cast novel) =

2008 novel by P.C. Cast and Kristin Cast

Untamed House of Night
- The first edition cover of Untamed
- Author: P.C. Cast; Kristin Cast
- Language: English
- Series: House of Night
- Genre: Young adult Paranormal romance
- Publisher: St. Martin's
- Publication date: September 23, 2008
- Publication place: United States
- Media type: Print(Paperback & Hardback); Audio CD
- Pages: 338
- ISBN: 978-0-312-37983-4
- OCLC: 213300786
- Preceded by: Chosen
- Followed by: Hunted

Untamed is the fourth novel of the House of Night fantasy series written by P.C. Cast and Kristin Cast. The book was published on September 23, 2008, by St. Martin's Press, an extension of Macmillan Publishers, reaching #8 in ALA Teens Top 10 in 2009. Subsequently, it has been translated in over 20 different languages.

== Synopsis ==
Zoey, considered to be the most gifted of the fledglings, has been ostracized by her tight group of friends after concealing Stevie Rae's resurrection and her relationship with professor Loren Blake. Aphrodite begins to experience visions of Zoey's death, as well as the re-emergence of an ancient threat.

== Plot ==
Zoey is hiding in the stables with her horse, Persephone. After an internal debate she finally decides to talk with her friends. On the way to the cafeteria she feels the presence of Darkness and rushes inside. She tries to blend in and act normally but her friends ignore her and the situation degenerates with the appearance of a newly re-Marked Aphrodite, who chooses to sit with the 'nerd herd'. A confrontation is postponed by the arrival of new fledgling and famous archer James Stark.

After lunch, Zoey meets Aphrodite and Stevie Rae in her room. She finds out that Stevie Rae is mostly normal now and the only differences she experiences is an intense aversion to sunlight, and that Aphrodite's Mark is fake – she has mostly reverted to a human teenager, except for her visions. Zoey casts the circle and asks for guidance. Nyx appears to tell them that she still loves Aphrodite, that she was only safekeeping the Earth affinity for Stevie Rae, and that she reverted to human because her own humanity was too strong.

After the goddess' disappearance, they rush to a Council meeting. They find out that the Priestess of all vampyres, Shekinah, has come to the House of Night to reject Neferet's declaration of war on humans. She follows Zoey's advice to put Detective Marx on the case instead. Erik Night returns to the school and takes over Professor Nolan's drama class, much to Zoey's dismay. On her way back Zoey meets Stark and watches him practice. He confesses to her that he has a gift for archery – that he never misses a target – and it was discovered when he killed his mentor by mistake. Because he fears his power, he asks Zoey to use her powers to protect the others from him. Quickly after he confesses his gift, he starts to cough up blood. While he is dying, Zoey tells him about Stevie Rae and how he can come back to life.

Zoey, Darius and Aphrodite go to Street Cats, a local cat shelter, as Zoey has been searching for a community activity for the Dark Daughters. The organization is led by nuns from the Benedictine Abbey. Their leader, Sister Mary Angela, astounds Zoey with the contrast between her beliefs and John Heffer's.

At school she's late for drama class and Erik, the new teacher, makes her play Desdemona to his Othello in a Shakespeare improvisation. She's initially mad, but uses this as an opportunity to explain her feelings for him and kisses him just before the bell rings, but he storms off. Outside, she meets Darius who brings her to Aphrodite, revealing a gift for speed. Aphrodite has been having a vision of Sylvia Redbird's house and copies out a poem in her writing. Zoey calls her grandmother and together they uncover that the poem is a warning about an ancient Cherokee legend. The poem warns that Kalona, a fallen angel, will rise again throughout the help of the Tsi Sgili queen, a dark witch that uses pain. Her grandmother also warns her to beware the Raven Mockers, half-raven half-human offspring of Kalona. Zoey asks her to come to the House of Night to be safe.

Zoey then goes to Shekinah, and is attacked by a Raven Mocker on the way. She escapes Aphrodite's second vision of death by calling for Damien, who sends Air to banish the creature. Outside the Council chambers she happens to eavesdrop on a discussion between Neferet and Shekinah. She incredulously hears how Neferet manages to twist all the problems she's faced since the beginning of her change and make it seem as if they were Zoey's fault.

Back at school, Zoey begins a cleansing ritual at Shekinah's request. Zoey tries to introduce the red fledglings and Stevie Rae makes an appearance, but is interrupted by Neferet who brings an undead Stark and tries to frame Zoey. In the ensuing commotion, Neferet makes Stark shoot Stevie Rae, fulfilling another line of Aphrodite's poem. Her blood frees Kalona. Neferet reveals herself as the Tsi Sgili queen from the poem, and then kills Shekinah with her thoughts to prove it.

== Characters ==
- Zoey Redbird: The main protagonist of the series. She has an affinity for all five elements (air, fire, water, earth, and spirit), and is the only High Priestess to have ever been given that magnitude of power by the goddess Nyx. Zoey is also the youngest High Priestess in vampyre history.
- Nyx: The goddess of the vampyres and Kalona used to be her warrior that he loved to much and she banished him.
- Erik Night: A former fledgling and Zoey's ex-boyfriend, now the vampyre Tracker for Tulsa's House of Night. Erik has a talent for acting, and once won an international House of Night monologue competition. He and Shaunee later start seeing each other.
- Stevie Rae Johnson: Zoey's best friend, and the first red vampyre High Priestess in history. She also has an affinity for earth and is Rephaim's girlfriend later in the series.
- Neferet: The main antagonist and former High Priestess, now immortal consort of Darkness and witch queen of the Tsi Sgili. Neferet is initially introduced as a kind, loving mentor to Zoey, but is gradually revealed to be on the side of Darkness.
- Heath Luck: Zoey's human "almost-boyfriend", who cannot seem to stay away despite her best efforts. Their Imprint breaks twice: once when Zoey Imprints with Loren Blake, and again when Heath is killed by Kalona. Part of Heath's soul later returns in Aurox, the Vessel created by Neferet.
- Aphrodite LaFont: Former "hag from hell" and Zoey's enemy in the first book. Aphrodite starts as a rather bitchy and arrogant vampyre fledgeling. Aphrodite is later unmarked to save Stevie Rae and the two imprint briefly. Her visions remain in spite of losing her mark and becomes an oracle and prophetess. Gradually grows to trust Zoey and the rest of the nerd herd.
- Sylvia Redbird: Zoey's grandmother, a Cherokee Wise Woman. She owns a lavender farm and is often on hand to give Zoey advice and reassurance in the fight against Darkness.
- Loren Blake: The vampyre Poet Laureate and a professor at the House of Night, he flirts with Zoey and later Imprints with her, but is revealed to be Neferet's lover and puppet. Neferet kills him in Chosen when he begins to show real concern for Zoey.
- Erin Bates: A fledgling and member of the nerd herd with an affinity for water before she left to be with the evil red fledgling Dallas. Her body eventually rejects the Change and she dies.
- Shaunee Cole: A fledgling and member of the nerd herd with an affinity for fire. She is Erin Bates twin until she starts to grow her own personality much to Erin's dismay. Suffers the loss of her twin.
- Damien Maslin: A fledgling, member of the nerd herd with an affinity for air. Jack is his boyfriend until being murdered by Neferet. Damien eventually finds love again.
- James Stark: A red vampyre who becomes Zoey's Warrior and Guardian, and has an affinity for archery.
- Jack Twist: Damien's boyfriend
- Darius: A son of Erebus

== Reception ==
The book ranked #10 in the New York Times, USA Today Top 150 Bestseller List, where it remained for 58 weeks. The novel also entered the ALA Teens Top 10 in 2009, ranking #8.

"The mother and daughter writing team have created a believable world with characters that you can't let go of. The story is addictive and the cliffhanger ending in this installment has me wishing the months till March will fly by!" (ParaNormal Romance)
