= Utica Square =

Oklahoma shopping center

Coordinates: 36°07′55″N 95°57′50″W

Utica Square is an upscale outdoor shopping center located in Tulsa, Oklahoma. The mall is anchored by a branch of the Saks Fifth Avenue chain (which opened at Utica Square in 1986). The shopping center features a number of smaller, mostly independent shops.

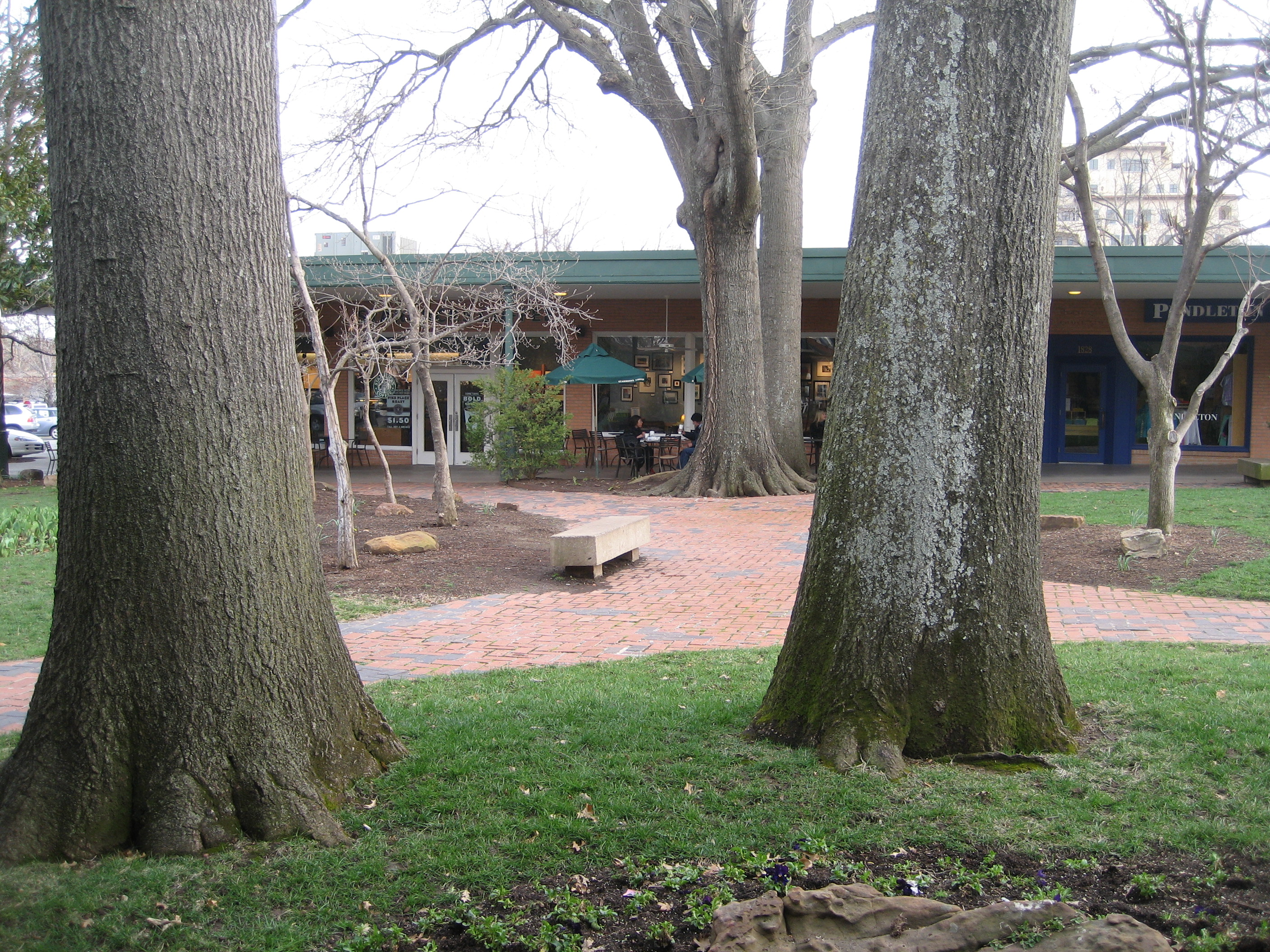
A courtyard in Utica Square (shops in background)

Utica Square opened on May 22, 1952, as Tulsa's first suburban shopping center. Helmerich & Payne, Inc., an energy company, purchased Utica Square in 1964, and bought Miss Jackson's in 2001.

Previous anchor stores included Renberg's (closed 1998), John A. Brown Department Store (converted to Dillard's in 1984; Dillard's closed 2001), TG&Y, and C.R. Anthony. Current stores include American Eagle, Ann Taylor, Anthropologie, Banana Republic, Coach, Talbots, Williams Sonoma, Pottery Barn, L’Occitane, Restoration Hardware, Starbucks, and JoS. A. Bank Clothiers. A medical building was built in 1956 and demolished in 2002.

On February 10, 2026, it was announced that Saks Fifth Avenue would be closing as part of a plan to close 8 stores nationwide.

Utica Square is mentioned frequently in P.C. and Kristin Cast's House of Night books.

== Anchors ==
- Saks Fifth Avenue (48,000 square feet)

== Stores ==
- Alo
- Amber Marie & Co.
- Anthropologie
- Athleta
- Banana Republic
- Bar Serra
- Bath & Body Works
- Big River Footwear Co.
- Cedar & Lily
- Chase
- Ediblend
- Evereve
- Fleming’s
- GAP
- Gearhead Outfitters
- Glacier
- Grand Vin Bottle Shop
- Hicks Brunson
- Ihloff
- J. Jill
- J. Spencer
- Johnny Was
- Jos. A. Bank
- Kendra Scott
- Loft
- The Lolly Garden
- L’Occitane en Provence
- Madewell
- Margo’s
- Moody’s Jewelry
- Muse Intimates
- Olive Garden
- P.F. Chang’s
- Pavilion
- Pepper’s
- Polo Grill
- Pottery Barn
- Queenie’s
- Recover
- RH
- Rise
- Rye 51
- Salt Yoga
- Sephora
- Starbucks
- Stems
- Stonehorse Café
- Stonehorse Market
- Talbots
- Ted’s Pipe Shoppe
- The Dolphin
- The Snow Goose
- The Wild Fork
- Utica Square Post Office
- Walgreens
- West Elm
- Whiskers
- White Black House Market
- Williams-Sonoma

== See also ==
- Leading shopping districts by city
