= Burned (Cast novel) =

Book by P. C. Cast

- The first edition cover of Burned
- Author: P.C. Cast; Kristin Cast
- Language: English
- Series: House of Night
- Genre: Young adult Paranormal romance, Fantasy
- Publisher: St. Martin's
- Publication date: April 27, 2010
- Publication place: United States
- Media type: Print (Paperback & Hardback); Audio CD
- Pages: 323
- ISBN: 978-0-312-60616-9
- OCLC: 607084181
- Preceded by: Tempted
- Followed by: Awakened

Burned is the seventh volume of the House of Night fantasy series written by P.C. Cast and Kristin Cast. It was published on April 27, 2010, by St. Martin's Press, an extension of Macmillan Publishers.

Zoey's soul has shattered and while her friends search through Kramisha's prophetic poems to bring her back Stevie Rae has to step in her shoes and hold the House of Night together while dealing with her own secrets.

== Plot ==
=== Isle of Sgiach ===
Stark, Darius and Aphrodite follow the clues in Kramisha's prophetic poems and take Zoey's body to the Isle of Sgiach to find a way of getting Zoey back. They gain entrance because of Stark's being the blood relative of Seoras, the queen's Guardian (the "bridge of blood"). Together with Sgiach they decipher the rest of the poem and realize that Stark must become a Shaman to step into the Otherworld.

Stark sacrifices on the altar of Seol ne Gigh and through pain he enters a trance where he kills the evil side of himself to become a Shaman. After the fight, the Black Bull leads him to the Otherworld.

=== Otherworld ===
Zoey meets Heath in the Otherworld and refuses to be parted from him a second time. As time passes she becomes more and more erratic. Heath feels bad as he sees her fall apart, but is powerless to stop it as Zoey herself is too afraid to accept the lost parts of her soul back.

When Stark arrives, he follows Aphrodite's advice and contacts Heath first, as Zoey wouldn't leave with Heath still in the Otherworld with her. Stark argues that Zoey might still accept her soul back and stay with Heath, but Neferet would win in the real world. Realizing that Stark speaks the truth and is not motivated by jealousy anymore, Heath speaks one more time with Zoey and disappears.

While Zoey stays behind, crying, Stark comes and tries to get Zoey to come back, but she is too scared. To get her to act, Stark comes out of the enchanted meadow and faces Kalona in an arena. Terrified that Stark might die too, Zoey finally calls back the fragments of her soul. Stark is temporarily distracted, and Kalona kills him. Zoey calls air and fixes Kalona to the wall of the arena. She calls in the debt he owes her for Heath's death to save Stark, and Nyx materializes and forces Kalona to share some of his immortality with Stark before banishing him from her realm.

=== Tulsa ===
After having nearly burned down on a roof, Stevie Rae recovers quickly due to Rephaim's Immortal blood and their Imprint. She learns of Zoey's soul shattering and has to balance the expectations of those who would expect her to step in Zoey's shoes. She escapes her friends to talk to Rephaim and the two make a pact to help each other until Zoey or Kalona returns to her or his body.

Stevie Rae follows the clues in Kramisha's poems and decides to invoke Light, materialized as one of the bulls. By wrongly presuming that Light will materialize as the white Bull, she accidentally invokes Darkness, who nonetheless gives Stark access to the Otherworld. To reach her in time, Rephaim calls unto the immortal powers of his father to heal his wing, without realizing that it's actually Darkness too, that answers. He reaches her in time and takes on her debt to Darkness, allowing the Bull to feed on his pain. To save him, Stevie Rae calls the black Bull, Light and accepts to be forever bound to Rephaim's humanity in exchange for Light's saving him. The Bulls start fighting and disappear. Dallas appears and takes a wounded Stevie Rae home.

When she heals she takes the red fledglings to conquer the tunnels. On the way, Dallas discovers an affinity for the New world, electricity, and leads them to the kitchens where the renegades are gathered. Five of them die in the ensuing confrontation, but none of Stevie Rae's, because of her Earth affinity and the others flee. Stevie Rae and Dallas remain behind to finish cleaning up. Dallas kisses Stevie Rae when Rephaim finds them, alerted by the Imprint. Realizing that Stevie Rae has saved and sheltered him, Dallas lets himself be influenced by the residual Darkness left by the renegades and fights him. When Stevie Rae protects Rephaim, Dallas accepts Darkness and Changes and angrily rushes out, threatening to tell everyone at the House of Night the truth. When she finds out he has stolen her car, Stevie Rae lets Rephaim fly her to Gilcrease, where she goes to sleep.

The next day, Stevie Rae calls Lenobia, to find that Dallas has never reached the House of Night, and Aphrodite, to learn that she has had a vision about her and Rephaim. Stevie Rae and Rephaim confess their feelings for each other and Nyx offers them a vision of a human Rephaim. As they look transfixed, Kalona returns to the real world, along with Zoey, and Rephaim leaves, confessing he can't turn his back on his father.

== Characters ==
- Zoey Redbird: The main protagonist of the series. She has an affinity for all five elements (air, fire, water, earth, and spirit), and is the only High Priestess to have ever been given that magnitude of power by the goddess Nyx. Zoey is also the youngest High Priestess in vampyre history.
- Nyx: The goddess of the vampyres and Kalona used to be her warrior that he loved to much and she banished him.
- Erik Night: A former fledgling and Zoey's ex-boyfriend, now the vampyre Tracker for Tulsa's House of Night. Erik has a talent for acting, and once won an international House of Night monologue competition. He and Shaunee later start seeing each other.
- Stevie Rae Johnson: Zoey's best friend, and the first red vampyre High Priestess in history. She also has an affinity for earth and is Rephaim's girlfriend later in the series.
- Neferet: The main antagonist and former High Priestess, now immortal consort of Darkness and witch queen of the Tsi Sgili. Neferet is initially introduced as a kind, loving mentor to Zoey, but is gradually revealed to be on the side of Darkness.
- Heath Luck: Zoey's human "almost-boyfriend", who cannot seem to stay away despite her best efforts. Their Imprint breaks twice: once when Zoey Imprints with Loren Blake, and again when Heath is killed by Kalona. Part of Heath's soul later returns in Aurox, the Vessel created by Neferet.
- Aphrodite LaFont: Former "hag from hell" and Zoey's enemy in the first book. Aphrodite starts as a rather bitchy and arrogant vampyre fledgeling. Aphrodite is later unmarked to save Stevie Rae, and the two imprint briefly. Her visions remain in spite of losing her mark and becomes an oracle and prophetess. Gradually grows to trust Zoey and the rest of the nerd herd.
- Kalona: Fallen immortal Guardian of Nyx. Father of Rephaim and the Raven Mockers. He was once a glorious winged immortal of Nyx as well as her warrior, but he grew jealous of his brother and was eventually deceived by Darkness, and was thus cast from the Otherworld by Nyx, an act that broke her heart. His wings turned black after this, reflecting the taint of Darkness in his soul.
- Sylvia Redbird: Zoey's grandmother, a Cherokee Wise Woman. She owns a lavender farm and is often on hand to give Zoey advice and reassurance in the fight against Darkness.
- Erin Bates: A fledgling and member of the nerd herd with an affinity for water before she left to be with the evil red fledgling Dallas. Her body eventually rejects the Change and she dies.
- Shaunee Cole: A fledgling and member of the nerd herd with an affinity for fire. She is Erin Bate's twin until she starts to grow her own personality much to Erin's dismay. Suffers the loss of her twin.
- Damien Maslin: A fledgling, member of the nerd herd with an affinity for air. Jack is his boyfriend until being murdered by Neferet. Damien eventually finds love again.
- Jack Twist: Damien's boyfriend
- Rephaim: leader of the Raven Mockers
- Darius: A son of Erebus
- Sgiach: Queen of Skye
- Seoras: Sgiach's guardian

== Reception ==
In its opening week the book ranked 1st on the New York Times, USA Today Top 150 Bestseller List. It won the Goodreads Choice Award for Favorite Book, Young Adult Fantasy, Favorite Heroine and a nomination for Teen Read Award for Best series in 2010.

"Any fans of this book would be out of their mind not to rush out and buy this new installment. It is a must-buy and must read to anyone who has been following the House of the Night series. Now that I have come this far I know there is no turning back."(ParaNormal Romance)
