= Marked (novel) =

2007 novel by P.C. Cast and Kristin Cast

- The first edition cover of Marked
- Author: P.C. Cast; Kristin Cast
- Cover artist: Cara E. Petrus
- Language: English
- Series: House of Night
- Genre: Young adult Paranormal romance
- Publisher: St. Martin's
- Publication date: May 1, 2007
- Publication place: United States
- Media type: Print (Paperback & Hardback); Audio CD
- Pages: 306
- ISBN: 978-0-312-36026-9
- OCLC: 84838635
- Followed by: Betrayed

Marked is the first novel of the House of Night fantasy series written by P.C. Cast and Kristin Cast. The book was released on May 1, 2007 by St. Martin's Press, an extension of Macmillan Publishers.

Young teenagers are selected to enter a four-year period transformation to a vampyre and marked with the unfilled mark of a crescent moon. Those are sent to their local Houses of Night, private schools directed by vampyres, specialized in helping the adolescents, called fledglings, survive the Change.

Young fledgling Zoey is unusual: unlike other normal fledglings, she bears a filled mark, a sign that the goddess of vampyres, Nyx, has bestowed a great destiny onto her, but she also has to deal with normal high school girl issues, like school, boyfriends and the evil popular girl waiting just around the corner.

The book has been translated into more than 20 languages including French, Spanish, German and Chinese.

== Plot ==
Sixteen-year-old Zoey Redbird lives in a world where vampires, or "vampyres" have always existed. One day, during school, Zoey is marked by a Tracker to become a fledgling vampyre at the Tulsa House of Night, a boarding school where she will be trained to become an adult vampyre. She gets stopped outside in the parking lot by her ex-boyfriend Heath and his friends, who call her a freak and drive away. Zoey then hurries home to tell her mom. Her mother, Linda Heffer, blames her for the Mark and, together with her ultra-religious husband (Zoey's stepfather/step-loser), she tries to keep Zoey at home, to be presented to the Elders of the People of Faith, an anti-vampyre group. As fledglings need to be constantly in the presence of an adult vampyre so that their bodies won't reject the Change, Zoey flees to her grandmother Sylvia, a Cherokee Wise Woman. On the way, she passes out and has a vision with the vampyre goddess, Nyx, who announces to Zoey that she will be her "eyes and ears" at the House of Night. The goddess leaves Zoey with the words "Darkness does not always equate to evil, Light does not always bring good" which becomes a very frequent and important message throughout the series.

Zoey wakes up at the school in the presence of her grandmother and the vampyre headmaster – her future mentor, Neferet. She finds out that her Mark is all filled in, unusually for fledglings, but follows her intuition and doesn't mention the vision to Neferet. As a fledgling vampyre, Zoey has the opportunity to change her name and does so, taking her grandmother's surname, Redbird, before parting with her. Another fledgling then takes her to her room, where she meets Stevie Rae, her new roommate and future best friend.

Through Stevie Rae, Zoey meets and befriends Damien, Erin, and Shaunee. She also meets the snobby, beautiful leader of the Dark Daughters and Sons, Aphrodite, a fledgling with the power to see the future. To humiliate Zoey she invites her to join the Dark Daughters, who are an elitist group. Her new friends counsel her to accept so that they can get insight into Aphrodite's doings. During the ritual, Aphrodite feeds her fledgling blood and Zoey discovers a new craving, unusual for her age. Embarrassed, she flees – but finds Heath and Kayla, her best friend, who have come to the school in an attempt to bust Zoey out. Zoey stumbles upon them while Kayla is hitting on Heath. An angry confrontation ensues with her now ex-best friend and Zoey loses control. She scratches Heath and drinks from the wound, creating an Imprint with him. Kayla freaks out and runs away; Zoey eventually persuades Heath to leave too. When they have gone, Zoey discovers that Erik Night, a handsome fifth former and Dark Son whom she met earlier, has seen the whole scene. He comforts her and escorts her back to the dorm. That night she is chosen by a cat, whom she names Nala.

The following day, she meets Neferet, who explains to her that an Imprint is a link that takes place between an adult vampyre and his or her human Consort. As it is very unusual that Zoey could create an Imprint in her first month of being a "vampyre", she places Zoey into a senior vampyre sociology course. Zoey discovers that she has affinities for the five elements of air, fire, earth, water, and spirit – something that has never happened before in vampyre history. Stevie Rae, Damien, Shaunee, and Erin each gain an affinity for one element as well.

Zoey is (spitefully) invited back to the Dark Daughters and Sons' Samhain celebration, where they honor the spirits with some blood. Everything goes fine until sobered up Heath stumbles upon the scene and tries to bring Zoey back with him. Aphrodite accidentally summons evil spirits which try to take Heath's fresh human blood. Zoey steps in; she and her friends use their newfound abilities to stop the spirits. Neferet, who happens to witness everything, takes Aphrodite's status as leader of the Dark Daughters and Sons and gives it to Zoey instead. As they go home, Aphrodite angrily informs Zoey that "it's not over yet – you don't understand."

== Characters ==
- Zoey Redbird: The main protagonist of the series. She has an affinity for all five elements (air, fire, water, earth, and spirit), and is the only High Priestess to have ever been given that magnitude of power by the goddess Nyx. Zoey is also the youngest High Priestess in vampyre history.
- Nyx: The goddess of the vampyres and Kalona used to be her warrior that he loved to much and she banished him.
- Erik Night: A former fledgling and Zoey's ex-boyfriend, now the vampyre Tracker for Tulsa's House of Night. Erik has a talent for acting, and once won an international House of Night monologue competition. He and Shaunee later start seeing each other.
- Stevie Rae Johnson: Zoey's best friend, and the first red vampyre High Priestess in history. She also has an affinity for earth and is Rephaim's girlfriend later in the series.
- Neferet: The main antagonist and former High Priestess, now immortal consort of Darkness and witch queen of the Tsi Sgili. Neferet is initially introduced as a kind, loving mentor to Zoey, but is gradually revealed to be on the side of Darkness.
- Heath Luck: Zoey's human "almost-boyfriend", who cannot seem to stay away despite her best efforts. Their Imprint breaks twice: once when Zoey Imprints with Loren Blake, and again when Heath is killed by Kalona. Part of Heath's soul later returns in Aurox, the Vessel created by Neferet.
- Aphrodite LaFont: Former "hag from hell" and Zoey's enemy in the first book. Aphrodite starts as a rather bitchy and arrogant vampyre fledgeling. Aphrodite is later unmarked to save Stevie Rae and the two imprint briefly. Her visions remain in spite of losing her mark and becomes an oracle and prophetess. Gradually grows to trust Zoey and the rest of the nerd herd.
- Sylvia Redbird: Zoey's grandmother, a Cherokee Wise Woman. She owns a lavender farm and is often on hand to give Zoey advice and reassurance in the fight against Darkness.
- Erin Bates: A fledgling and member of the nerd herd with an affinity for water before she left to be with the evil red fledgling Dallas. Her body eventually rejects the Change and she dies.
- Shaunee Cole: A fledgling and member of the nerd herd with an affinity for fire. She is Erin Bates twin until she starts to grow her own personality much to Erin's dismay. Suffers the loss of her twin.
- Damien Maslin: A fledgling, member of the nerd herd with an affinity for air. Jack is his boyfriend until being murdered by Neferet. Damien eventually finds love again.
- Linda Heffer: Zoey's mother

== Reception ==
In its best week the book ranked 16th in the New York Times, USA Today Top 150 Bestseller List, where it remained an additional 89 weeks. Furthermore, it won a Romantic Times Reviewers' Choice Young Adult Novel Award in 2009.

"The Casts, mother and daughter, have written a delightful book that's aimed at teens but will be enjoyed by readers of all ages. The trials of growing up are presented in the new and original context of a vampire society, and they're woven into a thoroughly entertaining story. Zoey is a dynamic and spunky heroine who has an amusing and realistic voice. She's surrounded by secondary characters who are just as engaging. The dialogue is sharp and the references to real people and pop culture add to the story. This promises to be a highly addictive series."(Romantic Times)
"From the moment I stuck my face in this book it hooked me! Totally awesome new take on vampires! Marked is hot and dark and funny. It rocks!" (Gena Showalter)
