= Hunted (Cast novel) =

2009 novel by P. C. Cast and Kristin Cast

- The first edition cover of Hunted
- Author: P.C. Cast; Kristin Cast
- Language: English
- Series: House of Night
- Genre: Young adult Paranormal romance
- Publisher: St. Martin's
- Publication date: March 10, 2009
- Publication place: United States
- Media type: Print (Paperback & Hardback); Audio CD
- Pages: 439
- ISBN: 978-0-312-37982-7
- OCLC: 243544574
- Preceded by: Untamed
- Followed by: Tempted

Hunted is the fifth novel of the House of Night fantasy series written by P.C. Cast and Kristin Cast. The book was published on March 10, 2009, by St. Martin's Press, an extension of Macmillan Publishers. By February 2010, according to Publishers Weekly it had already sold 950.000 copies. Since, it was translated in more than 20 languages.

The book picks up after the events in Untamed. Kalona has sprung free of his prison and reigns over the minds and hearts of the fledglings at the Tulsa House of Night. Zoey and her friends hide deep under Tulsa, but they will soon learn that they can't hide forever and soon they'll have to get together to send him and Neferet away.

== Plot ==
Zoey and her friends help Stevie Rae heal after the events at the end of Untamed – the arrow did not kill her, but took most of her lifeblood, so Kalona could be freed from the earth. Zoey and Stevie Rae reconcile, and the latter introduces Zoey's group to some of the red vampyre fledglings. Aphrodite lets Stevie Rae feed on her to heal, which forms an Imprint between them. When Erik follows Zoey on her way to her room they kiss, but then Erik gets too rough and scares her. Erik and Zoey get back together, though Zoey's not entirely sure due to Erik's possessiveness. Kalona starts getting into Zoey's dreams to seduce her, and calls her A-ya.

Kramisha, a red fledgling, is revealed to also express prophecies through her poetry, and Zoey gives her the title of Poet Laureate. This is how they find their first clue. One of Kramisha's poems states that Kalona and Neferet will be banished when Night, Humanity, Blood, Spirit and Earth come together, but Zoey doesn't know who will represent these elements.

Heath arrives at the tunnels, and Zoey goes outside to talk to him, much to Erik's anger. Heath tries to reconcile with her, but to no avail. A Raven Mocker attacks them and critically wounds Zoey. She drinks from Heath to heal and they Imprint again, but she is still weakened. Kramisha gets exited and loses her control a little when she sees Heath (a human), leading Zoey to realize that the red fledglings may still have problems with their self-control. Darius finally declares that Zoey needs exposure to more adult vampyres to survive, and she is forced to return to the House of Night, much to Neferet's pleasure. She finds out that Kalona's presence has caused the fledglings and the vampyres to turn their backs on Nyx. Kalona's favorite son, Rephaim, and Darius get into a fight. Kalona intercedes and gives Darius a huge scar which upsets Aphrodite.

Zoey successfully persuades Stark to turn back to the good side. He becomes the second red vampyre when he pledges his Warrior's Oath to Zoey and she accepts. Zoey discusses the situation with Lenobia and, upon analyzing Kramisha's poem again, finds out that she is Night, Blood is Stevie Rae, Humanity is Aphrodite, Sister Mary Angela is Spirit, and Grandma Redbird is Earth.

Zoey and her friends set fire to the school as a diversion and escape on horseback to the Benedictine Abbey. Zoey and the other people mentioned in the poem open a circle and send everyone else inside. Neferet, Kalona and Stark arrive quickly afterwards in an SUV, followed by the Raven Mockers. Neferet and Kalona take turns at threatening and cajoling Zoey but she finally accepts the truth: that although A-ya is a part of her, she will choose her own destiny. She rejects Kalona. Neferet orders Stark to shoot Zoey but he says that Zoey is his heart and aims at her while thinking of himself. Realizing what will happen, Zoey uses the elements to stop the arrow and knocks him out in the process. Night, Humanity, Blood, Spirit, and Earth complete the spell and banish Neferet and Kalona. Zoey's Mark spreads to across her scar. She is deeply in pain because she had to say goodbye to Kalona, and knows that the fight isn't over yet.

== Characters ==
- Zoey Redbird: The main protagonist of the series. She has an affinity for all five elements (air, fire, water, earth, and spirit), and is the only High Priestess to have ever been given that magnitude of power by the goddess Nyx. Zoey is also the youngest High Priestess in vampyre history.
- Nyx: The goddess of the vampyres and Kalona used to be her warrior that he loved to much and she banished him.
- Erik Night: A former fledgling and Zoey's ex-boyfriend, now the vampyre Tracker for Tulsa's House of Night. Erik has a talent for acting, and once won an international House of Night monologue competition. He and Shaunee later start seeing each other.
- Stevie Rae Johnson: Zoey's best friend, and the first red vampyre High Priestess in history. She also has an affinity for earth and is Rephaim's girlfriend later in the series.
- Neferet: The main antagonist and former High Priestess, now immortal consort of Darkness and witch queen of the Tsi Sgili. Neferet is initially introduced as a kind, loving mentor to Zoey, but is gradually revealed to be on the side of Darkness.
- Heath Luck: Zoey's human "almost-boyfriend", who cannot seem to stay away despite her best efforts. Their Imprint breaks twice: once when Zoey Imprints with Loren Blake, and again when Heath is killed by Kalona. Part of Heath's soul later returns in Aurox, the Vessel created by Neferet.
- Aphrodite LaFont: Former "hag from hell" and Zoey's enemy in the first book. Aphrodite starts as a rather bitchy and arrogant vampyre fledgeling. Aphrodite is later unmarked to save Stevie Rae and the two imprint briefly. Her visions remain in spite of losing her mark and becomes an oracle and prophetess. Gradually grows to trust Zoey and the rest of the nerd herd.
- Kalona: Fallen immortal Guardian of Nyx. Father of Rephaim and the Raven Mockers. He was once a glorious winged immortal of Nyx as well as her warrior, but he grew jealous of his brother and was eventually deceived by Darkness, and was thus cast from the Otherworld by Nyx, an act that broke her heart. His wings turned black after this, reflecting the taint of Darkness in his soul.
- Sylvia Redbird: Zoey's grandmother, a Cherokee Wise Woman. She owns a lavender farm and is often on hand to give Zoey advice and reassurance in the fight against Darkness.
- Darius: A son of Erebus
- James Stark: A red vampyre who becomes Zoey's Warrior and Guardian, and has an affinity for archery.

== Reception ==
In its opening week, the book ranked 1st in the New York Times, USA Today Top 150 Bestseller List, where it remained for 54 weeks.

"Forced by circumstance to grow up quickly, Zoey's emotional and spiritual evolution is fascinating. The Cast duo breathes life and vibrancy into the characters and makes each one an integral part of the saga. Awesome and unforgettable as always!"(Romantic Times)

"The most masterful part of the writing lies in how the authors take on serious issues sex, peer pressure, bullying, parental alienation, religion, and substance abuse and weave them into the text. It is a refreshing perspective that doesn't feel like preaching."(Tulsa World)
