= Destined (Cast novel) =

2011 novel by P.C. Cast and Kristin Cast

- The first edition cover
- Author: P.C. Cast; Kristin Cast
- Language: English
- Series: House of Night
- Genre: Young adult Paranormal romance
- Publisher: St. Martin's Press
- Publication date: October 25, 2011
- Publication place: United States
- Media type: Print (Paperback & Hardback); Audio CD
- Pages: 336
- ISBN: 978-0-312-65025-4
- OCLC: 707257497
- Preceded by: Awakened; Dragon's Oath
- Followed by: Lenobia's Vow; Hidden

Destined is the ninth volume of the House of Night fantasy series written by P.C. Cast and Kristin Cast. The book was published on October 25, 2011 by St. Martin's Press, an extension of Macmillan Publishers.

Zoey Redbird has started a new House of Night in the tunnels with her friends, but is struck hard when she finds out of her mother's death. Erik has become a Tracker and Rephaim has been granted the gift of humanity and they both struggle with their choices. Heath Luck has become part Neferet's vessel, Aurox, because of the sacrifice, Linda Heffer's, weakness.

== Plot ==
The book is told from no less than 11 points of view, respectively Zoey, Stevie Rae, Rephaim, Kalona, Stark, Aurox, Neferet, Shaunee, Lenobia, Dragon, and Erik.

In the prologue, Zoey is seen with Stark. She notices Darkness on him and commands Spirit to send the Darkness away. Zoey is unsure about the death of her mother. Meanwhile, Aurox kills a human person. The white bull comes and tells Aurox and Neferet that he can create chaos. Neferet plans to use Aurox to kill the white bull and rule the world as the Goddess of Vampyres.

Zoey and her friends return to school where she blindsides Neferet by initiating a Skype meeting with Duantia, the leader of the High Council. She gives her version of the events in Awakened and puts Neferet in the uncomfortable position of having to accept Rephaim at the House of Night. Next, she asks for a second House of Night under the Tulsa depot, but although Stevie Rae is accepted as the High Priestess of all the red fledglings by the Council, Duantia doesn't give a full answer regarding the request.

In the garden, Rephaim is visited by three of his Raven Mocker brothers, sent to him by Kalona to use his supposed misery and consequent bitterness to spy for him and even turn to Darkness. They are stunned to see him in his human form. Their meeting is interrupted by Aurox who kills one of them and proceeds to attack Rephaim. He is stopped by Stevie Rae, but not before she, Rephaim and Zoey see him half-shift into a bull. Neferet appears and diffuses the conflict, calling Aurox her gift from the Goddess.

Erik hears the commotion, but he falls under the Tracker compulsion before he can actually intervene. He finds Shaylin, a blind girl, and she makes him stumble over the traditional lines, so that when he finally marks her and she reveals a red Mark he blames himself. Shaylin recovers her eyesight and gains her first gift, the very rare True Sight, which allows a person to 'see' others in colors. Confused, Erik decides to take her to Stevie Rae. At the school, Zoey receives a visit from her grandmother, who confirms Linda's death and leaves for a seven-day period of mourning. Zoey runs off to mourn and Aurox finds her. He offers her a Kleenex, just like Heath used to. At the bus, Erik presents them with the girl. Neferet appears and Shaylin pretends to faint, later telling them she had the general color of dead fish eyes.

The next day at school, Rephaim feels the call of his father and calls Zoey to stand witness to the meeting. Kalona appears on the wall and offers them a truce against Neferet, which Zoey reluctantly accepts. As the discussion takes place during her first class, with Neferet, she skips it altogether. When she returns to the school building for her second period she finds out that the Council has sent Thanatos, a vampyre Priestess with an affinity for Death, to report on the situation at the House of Night, much to Neferet's displeasure. As Thanatos too can see the threads of Darkness, Zoey finds her sympathetic and eventually reveals her concerns about Neferet and her mother's death. Thanatos offers to perform a reveal ritual at the place of Linda's death on the fifth day of mourning.

Back at the depot, Zoey and her friends sit down to discuss the events. Rephaim finds unexpected support in Shaunee, who empathizes with him because of her father, but this leads to a break between the Twins, as Erin doesn't understand why Shaunee feels so strongly about this. Two more prophecies, one from Kramisha and one from Aphrodite, warn of Rephaim's death at the reveal ritual, probably at the hand of Dragon, so Thanatos asks him to remain at the House of Night, which he doesn't obey. While wondering in the tunnels, Shaunee spots Kalona, waiting for his son. Shaunee gives him her iPhone so that he can contact him until she can get him another phone.

Neferet finds out about the reveal ritual and sends Aurox to intervene. During the ritual, he charges out in his bull form but is stopped by Dragon, who sacrifices himself to save Rephaim. The ritual continues anyway; Zoey and her grandmother discover the real circumstances of Linda's murder. Dragon's death is what closes up the ritual, but Rephaim is seriously injured as well. Kalona arrives on the scene – having been called by Stevie Rae – and he expresses regret, asking Nyx not to kill Rephaim for his own mistakes. The request is granted, Rephaim regains consciousness. Thanatos then proceeds to Dragon and guides him to the Otherworld. A gateway is opened and everybody can see him happily reunited with Anastasia. Thanatos decides to become the new High Priestess of the Tulsa House of Night. Much to everybody's surprise, Kalona pledges himself as Thanatos's Warrior.

As they leave the scene, Zoey and her friends see a vision of Nyx, who reminds them that the fight will continue.

== Characters ==
- Zoey Redbird: The heroine of the series. She possesses an affinity for all five elements.
- Nyx: The Goddess of Night. She is the goddess that all vampyres and fledglings worship.
- Erik Night: Zoey's ex-boyfriend.
- Stevie Rae Johnson: Zoey's best friend and the first Red Vampyre High Priestess. She possesses an affinity for Earth.
- Neferet: High Priestess of the Tulsa House of Night and Zoey's mentor upon her arrival at the academy. It is revealed that she is an immortal witch allied with the forces of Darkness.
- Heath Luck: Zoey's first boyfriend; after his death, he becomes Aurox.
- Aphrodite LaFont: Daughter of the mayor of Tulsa. She was previously a Sixth Former fledgling, but is now a not-so-ordinary human. She is gifted with visions of possible future events.
- Kalona: Rephaim's father and now Thanatos' warrior.
- Sylvia Redbird: Zoey's grandmother
- Erin Bates: "Twin" of Shaunee Cole. She has an affinity for water.
- Shaunee Cole: "Twin" of Erin Bates. She has an affinity for fire.
- Damien Maslin: Jack's boyfriend.
- James Stark: Zoey's Consort and boyfriend.
- Jack Twist: Damien's boyfriend.
- Rephaim: Stevie Rae's Consort and boyfriend.
- Darius: A son of Erebus and Aphrodite's boyfriend.
- Shaylin Ruede: first Marked red fledgling in history.

== Reception ==
In its opening week Destined reached #3 in the New York Times, USA Today Top 150 Bestseller List.

"This amazing writing pair once again weaves together a world where rising darkness threatens and brave teens risk everything." (Romantic Times)

"As the plot lines converge later in the novel, the action becomes both intense and thoroughly entertaining….this outing will not disappoint House of Night fans."(Kirkus Reviews)
