= Tempted (Cast novel) =

2009 novel by P. C. Cast and Kristin Cast

- The first edition cover of Tempted
- Author: P.C. Cast; Kristin Cast
- Language: English
- Series: House of Night
- Genre: Young adult Paranormal romance
- Publisher: St. Martin's Press
- Publication date: October 27, 2009
- Publication place: United States
- Media type: Print (Paperback & Hardback); Audio CD
- Pages: 319
- ISBN: 978-1-905654-58-1
- OCLC: 316019665
- Preceded by: Hunted
- Followed by: Burned

Tempted is the sixth volume of the House of Night fantasy book series, written by American P.C. Cast and Kristin Cast. It was published on October 27, 2009, by St. Martin's Press, an extension of Macmillan Publishers. By February 2010, according to Publishers Weekly, it had already sold 1.1 million copies. The book has been translated in more than 20 different languages.

== Plot ==
Tempted starts immediately after the end of events in the 5th book, Hunted, and is told from the point of view of six characters: Zoey, Stevie Rae, Aphrodite, Rephaim, Heath and Stark.

Zoey has finally banished Neferet and Kalona, but he still haunts her dreams. When another prophecy warns Zoey of her choices, she realizes that she must follow her enemies up to the Vampire Council.

=== Zoey ===
In the aftermath Zoey gathers her allies and starts organizing them. Stevie Rae notices she's very tired and takes over, leaving Zoey to take care of a wounded Stark and her grandmother. Having recovered from her accident, she tells Zoey that she is A-ya's reincarnation and that A-ya was made to love Kalona, so that's why she cannot help being uncontrollably attracted to Kalona, as it's in her soul. In the end she's so stressed that when Erik finds her, demanding a share of her time, they quarrel and she dumps him for being overly jealous and possessive, taking her down to two love interests (whilst Erik forms a relationship with Venus, Aphrodite's ex-roommate).

She rooms in with Aphrodite and has a dream with Kalona at the same time she has a vision that links to several elements from the dream. Alerted by Zoey's panic, Stark climbs up to her room and sleeps there to guard her from further intrusions. Aphrodite leaves and takes Darius to Stark's abandoned room. While they talk, she realizes she's come to love him and is afraid she is incapable of returning his feelings. He soothes her and pledges his Warrior's Oath to her.

The kids return to the House of Night. They find Anastasia Lankford, a professor at the House of Night, dead at Rephaim's hands, and Dragon grieving her loss. Jack stays with Dragon to comfort him and coax him through his pain while Zoey goes to assess the mood of the school. Through Aphrodite's visions, Zoey's dreams of Kalona and Kramisha's prophetic poems they find that Kalona and Neferet plan on getting back the old ways of the vampyres. Following the rumors on Twitter, Jack finds Kalona and Neferet in Venice, on the isle of San Clemente with the Vampyre Council.

Another vision brings a new warning: if Zoey is with Kalona the world will end as they know it, and if she chooses love and Nyx he will "die" and the world will be safe. On the other hand, Zoey can't completely reject him, as she believes he can be saved. In an effort to gain her favor, Kalona shows her his past as Nyx's Warrior and promises to change his ways if she will have him.

Zoey and her friends go to Venice to have their say in the council, but Stevie Rae stays behind, arguing that it's her responsibility as a High Priestess to take care of the rogues. Upon arriving, they learn that Neferet claims to be Nyx Incarnate and Kalona claims to be Erebus. It is revealed that Zoey's destiny is to face Kalona alone, meaning that only she can save the world. The Council declares Aphrodite a Prophetess of the vampyres, but is otherwise distrusting of Zoey, mainly because of her age. After the Council session is over Heath and Zoey talk about the stresses of everything going on Zoey sends Heath to find Stark. He discovers Neferet and Kalona in a secret conversation; Kalona finds Heath. Heath uses the Imprint to call Zoey and she arrives to see Kalona kill him. In her anguish she throws Spirit at Kalona, but her soul shatters and goes to the Otherworld.

=== Stevie Rae ===
While sweeping the Benedictine Abbey grounds, Stevie Rae finds an injured Raven Mocker named Rephaim (the favored son of Kalona) and helps him to safety against her better judgement. She binds his wounds and sends him through the tunnels. Back at the House of Night, she's horrified to learn that he was actually the one to kill Dragon's mate, Anastasia Lankford.

In the tunnels Rephaim is found by the rogue red fledglings, and their leader, Nicole, uses her gift to peer into his mind and learns that Stevie Rae saved him. They use him as bait and catch Stevie Rae, leaving her alongside him in a cage on the roof to be burned down by the sun. Rephaim helps her and the two get in the ground at the last minute. To repay her for nursing him back to health, he offers her his immortal blood to heal her burns. Unexpectedly, the two Imprint and Stevie Rae loses hers with Aphrodite. Alerted by Aphrodite's going into painful convulsions, Zoey calls at the House of Night and Erik and Lenobia rush to find and save Stevie Rae. With the last of her powers, Stevie Rae hides Rephaim from their eyes as they get her out.

== Characters ==
- Zoey Redbird: The main protagonist of the series. She has an affinity for all five elements (air, fire, water, earth, and spirit), and is the only High Priestess to have ever been given that magnitude of power by the goddess Nyx. Zoey is also the youngest High Priestess in vampyre history.
- Nyx: The goddess of the vampyres and Kalona used to be her warrior that he loved to much and she banished him.
- Erik Night: A former fledgling and Zoey's ex-boyfriend, now the vampyre Tracker for Tulsa's House of Night. Erik has a talent for acting, and once won an international House of Night monologue competition. He and Shaunee later start seeing each other.
- Stevie Rae Johnson: Zoey's best friend, and the first red vampyre High Priestess in history. She also has an affinity for earth and is Rephaim's girlfriend later in the series.
- Neferet: The main antagonist and former High Priestess, now immortal consort of Darkness and witch queen of the Tsi Sgili. Neferet is initially introduced as a kind, loving mentor to Zoey, but is gradually revealed to be on the side of Darkness.
- Heath Luck: Zoey's human "almost-boyfriend", who cannot seem to stay away despite her best efforts. Their Imprint breaks twice: once when Zoey Imprints with Loren Blake, and again when Heath is killed by Kalona. Part of Heath's soul later returns in Aurox, the Vessel created by Neferet.
- Aphrodite LaFont: Former "hag from hell" and Zoey's enemy in the first book. Aphrodite starts as a rather bitchy and arrogant vampyre fledgeling. Aphrodite is later unmarked to save Stevie Rae and the two imprint briefly. Her visions remain in spite of losing her mark and becomes an oracle and prophetess. Gradually grows to trust Zoey and the rest of the nerd herd.
- Sylvia Redbird: Zoey's grandmother, a Cherokee Wise Woman. She owns a lavender farm and is often on hand to give Zoey advice and reassurance in the fight against Darkness.
- Erin Bates: A fledgling and member of the nerd herd with an affinity for water before she left to be with the evil red fledgling Dallas. Her body eventually rejects the Change and she dies.
- Shaunee Cole: A fledgling and member of the nerd herd with an affinity for fire. She is Erin Bates twin until she starts to grow her own personality much to Erin's dismay. Suffers the loss of her twin.
- Damien Maslin: A fledgling, member of the nerd herd with an affinity for air. Jack is his boyfriend until being murdered by Neferet. Damien eventually finds love again.
- James Stark: A red vampyre who becomes Zoey's Warrior and Guardian, and has an affinity for archery.
- Jack Twist: Damien's boyfriend
- Rephaim: leader of the Raven Mockers
- Darius: A son of Erebus

== Reception ==
In its opening week the book ranked 1st in the New York Times, USA Today Top 150 Bestseller List. Tempted was a RT Reviewers' Choice Award Nominee for Best Young Adult Paranormal/Fantasy Novel in 2011. "Cast and Cast pull out all the stops and take this story to shattering new heights with devastating consequences!"
