= Dragon's Oath =

2011 novella by P. C. Cast and Kristin Cast

- First edition cover
- Author: P.C. Cast; Kristin Cast
- Illustrator: Kim Doner
- Language: English
- Series: House of Night
- Genre: Young adult Paranormal romance
- Publisher: St. Martin's Press
- Publication date: July 12, 2011
- Publication place: United States
- Media type: Print (Paperback & Hardcover); Audiobook
- Pages: 145
- ISBN: 1-250-00023-8
- OCLC: 701013781
- Preceded by: Awakened
- Followed by: Destined; Lenobia's Vow

Dragon's Oath is the first of the House of Night novellas spin-off series, written by American authors P.C. Cast and Kristin Cast. It was published on July 12, 2011 by St. Martin's Press an extension of Macmillan Publishers.

The first book of the series takes place in Dragon's past, describing his meeting with Anastasia.

== Plot ==
Dragon sits by Jack's funeral pyre and reminisces about his first meeting with Anastasia. He pulls out a locket and opens it, but the wind lifts the last of her hair inside and carries it over to the pyre. This starts a spell Anastasia had laid on the locket, that conveys to Dragon her last wish, to temper his blade with mercy.

The book goes back to his human days. The third son of a lord, Bryan is young, cocky and bold. His father disowns him when he becomes involved in a scandal with a neighbour's daughter and sends him to the Americas. At the docks he meets a Tracker, who claims him as a fledgling and takes him aboard a ship with a sculpted dragon's head, which inspires Bryan in regards to his new name.

At the Chicago House of Night, Anastasia, a 22-year-old newly adult vampyre, has been hired as the Spells and Rituals teacher. While talking with the local High Priestess, Pandeia, and her mate, Anastasia brings up the problem of some fledglings who had asked for a love spell for Bryan. Instead of refusing them, she asks permission to perform a drawing spell, to show the fledglings the truth about Bryan.

She starts the spell on a night with a full moon. As she is also thinking of him at the time of the spell, she is shown a futuristic apparition of him, when he has fully Changed and is no longer a fledgling. Anastasia finds that she loves Bryan, and then he really appears as his nineteen-year-old self. Bryan, who is now Dragon, helps Anastasia finish her spell, and begins leaving her sun-flowers from that moment.

An officer, Jesse Biddle, consults with a creature (it is revealed at that this is Rephaim, the Raven Mocker who is Stevie Rae's Consort) about who he should kill – Anastasia – so that Light doesn't defeat them.

At the House of Night, Pandeia expresses concern regarding Biddle's harassment. Anastasia proposes she go and perform a peace spell. As a Warrior represents the opposite of the spell, they propose she take Bryan, who is still a fledgling, but already a Swordmaster. While she performs a circle near his place, Anastasia is attacked by Biddle and dragged inside after he chokes Bryan. Biddle fights and nearly kills Anastasia, and prepares to rape her, but she draws a circle of salt around her and creates a barrier.

Dragon comes and kills Biddle, and prepares to also kill the creature, but Anastasia has a vision of him and tells him to temper his strength with mercy, and think about what he's doing. Dragon sets the creature free and pledges his Warrior's Oath to her. As a result, he Changes into an adult vampyre.

Back to the present, Nyx and Anastasia materialize in front of him and make a last attempt to make him move on but he refuses. In the end he rejects Nyx for refusing to return Anastasia to him.

== Characters ==
- Dragon
- Anastasia
- Nyx

== Reception ==
"Now that I know about Dragon's life with Anastasia, I understand the man's need for vengeance. The reason for his cold efficiency in duty makes perfect sense. With this new novella series, readers will receive insights that may enhance the full-length [House of Night] series." (Huntress Reviews)
