= Awakened (novel) =

2011 novel

- The first edition cover of Awakened
- Author: P.C. Cast; Kristin Cast
- Language: English
- Series: House of Night
- Genre: Young adult, Paranormal romance, Fantasy
- Publisher: St. Martin's
- Publication date: January 4, 2011
- Publication place: United States
- Media type: Print (Paperback & Hardback); Audio CD
- Pages: 290
- ISBN: 978-0-312-65024-7
- OCLC: 648923066
- Preceded by: Burned
- Followed by: Dragon's Oath; Destined

Awakened is the eighth volume of the House of Night fantasy series written by American authors P.C. Cast and Kristin Cast. The novel was published on January 4, 2011, by St. Martin's Press, an extension of Macmillan Publishers.

Zoey has returned from the Otherworld and is spending time on Sgiach, learning of her powers. Back at the House of Night, Stevie Rae fights back to counteract the influence of Neferet and sort out her link to Rephaim. Both will have to learn that to survive they'll have to face their secrets.

== Plot ==
=== The Isle of Skye ===
Zoey and Stark reassure their connection by having sex under the wishing tree and become connected. Zoey finds out that she wields the ancient magick of the fey and can bring back old fey that serve her elements, prompting Queen Sgiach to ask her to stay on Skye indefinitely and be her successor.

Aphrodite and Darius leave Skye, but Zoey and Stark decide to stay a little longer while Stark recuperates. Zoey continuously senses Darkness on Skye, leading her to believe that she cannot hide from Darkness anymore.

=== Tulsa ===
Neferet returns to the House of Night. In an attempt to draw Zoey back from Skye after Kalona's failed mission, Neferet kills Jack as a debt payment to Darkness. Finding out about Jack's death, Zoey realizes that no matter how good she feels on Skye, Tulsa is her home and she has responsibilities as a High Priestess and returns.

Kalona finds out that he can enter Stark's mind because of the immortality he breathed into him. For the same reason, he realizes that the oath he swore to Neferet doesn't apply to him anymore as he hasn't been fully an immortal since his return.

Neferet allows Zoey to light Jack's funeral pyre and during the ceremony, Neferet asks Zoey for forgiveness to regain everyone's trust. Zoey accepts the fake apology even though she sees through Neferet, but many other people think the apology is genuine. Neferet summons Darkness to drag Rephaim to the funeral and accuses him of being allied with Darkness and Stevie Rae for being allied with Rephaim, then orders the Sons of Erebus to kill both of them.

Kalona interferes and faces the Sons of Erebus with Rephaim. The two fight, but Rephaim only defends himself rather than attacking the warriors. Stevie Rae asks her friends to cast a circle to stop the battle and save Rephaim. She asks Kalona for his son's freedom and he grants it and takes off. A white feather falls from him, symbolizing his good deed. The feather breaks Stevie Rae's concentration and Dragon Lankford lunges to kill Rephaim. Convinced by Stevie Rae's words, Zoey steps between them and stops Dragon, arguing that Rephaim is on the same side, having chosen the path of Light.

Nyx appears then and forgives Rephaim, bespelling him to take human form at night and raven form during the day, to atone for killing Anastasia. She also talks to Damien and Dragon, to convince them to move on, then disappears. Rephaim goes to Dragon and offers his service to pay for the grief he had caused, but Dragon rejects him. When Zoey tries to calm Dragon, he lashes at her for her age.

Because Neferet and Dragon do not accept him at the House of Night, Zoey, her friends, and the red fledglings leave to start a new House of Night on their own in the tunnels, with Zoey being the "vampyre queen", Stevie Rae being the High Priestess, Aphrodite being the Prophetess, Kramisha being the Poet Laureate, and all the red fledglings and Zoey's friends being the students.

Towards the end of the book, Neferet cooperates with the white bull and intends on sacrificing Sylvia Redbird, but ends up killing Linda Heffer (who had recently left Zoey's stepfather due to his infidelity) to create a Vessel for her (someone who has to obey her completely) as a weapon to use against Zoey. Meanwhile, in the Otherworld, Heath is given the opportunity by Nyx, to be the lost soul in this Vessel and he chooses it over being reborn in the real world or remaining in the Otherworld; this way, he can help Zoey in the modern world. Meanwhile, Stark and Zoey are making out and preparing to have sex for their third time, but Stark becomes aggressive, which is unlike himself. He bites Zoey, but she is finally able to stop him (It is implied that it was Kalona, not Stark, in Stark's soul, who took over and got aggressive). When they go to sleep, Zoey has a dream where she learns of her mother's death and realizes that her mother really cared for her. The book ends with Zoey waking up with this new realization and beginning to cry and grieve for her mother's death, and Stark being there to comfort her.

== Publication history ==
In an interview with Entertainment Weekly, the authors confessed their choice of dedication was inspired by the gay suicides in September 2010. The phrase is styled after the It Gets Better Project pledge as a public acknowledgement of their support.

== Reception ==
Following the pattern set by the last three volumes of the series, Awakened debuted at the top of the New York Times, USA Today Top 150 Bestseller List, where it remained for a total of 15 weeks.

"The mega-selling Cast team continues to reveal its pulse-pounding saga through the viewpoints of multiple characters, giving fresh insight into their hearts and motivations... Tragedy, sacrifice and choice are all themes that make this story gripping." - (Romantic Times)
