= Brenda Hiatt =

American novelist

Personal details
- Education: College of William and Mary (BA)
- Occupation: Writer/Teacher

Brenda Hiatt is an American, New York Times and USA Today bestselling author of romantic adventure novels, including traditional Regency romance, time travel romance, historical novels, contemporary humorous mystery, and most recently young adult science fiction romance.

== Biography ==
Born in Washington, D.C., Hiatt graduated from the College of William and Mary, in Williamsburg, VA, with degrees in biology and psychology in 1978, before attending graduate school at Texas A&M University 1979–81. She has since lived in Hawaii, South Carolina, Texas, Indiana and now Florida. She is married and has two children.

== Early career ==
Hiatt has said "I began writing in 1988, an army wife at home with two preschool children. I promised myself that, if nothing sold before my youngest began school, I'd get a 'real job,' so I was thrilled to sell a Regency romance novel to Harlequin six months ahead of that deadline."

== Writing career ==
Hiatt's published novels include six Harlequin Regency Romances, one Harlequin Superromance, two single title historical romances with HarperCollins, six historical romances with Avon Books, and a self-published six book young adult science fiction romance series. Hiatt's first single title historical romance, Scandalous Virtue, was named Best Romance Novel of 1999 by the American Book Readers Association and, like many of her books, is of the Regency Romance genre. Her one time travel romance, Bridge Over Time, presents an unusual spin in the time travel genre as it features two heroines who trade places in time and gives equal time to both. Her traditionally published works also include a Regency Historical Romance series featuring "the Saint of Seven Dials," a series of successive rogue heroes who victimize the rich to help impoverished residents in London's notorious Seven Dials slum. She then went on to publish two spin-off Regency romances with Avon, which became her Seven Saints Hunt Club series.

In September 2013, Hiatt released Starstruck, her first teen science fiction themed novel and the first in a four-book series. The second book in the series, Starcrossed, was released in late January 2014. Book 3 in the series, Starbound, was released in June 2014 with Book 4, Starfall, released in February 2015 as the conclusion to the series. Successful sales of the series and demand from readers for more of it prompted her to release Fractured Jewel, A Starstruck Novella in July 2016. In June 2017 Hiatt released The Girl From Mars, featuring a new heroine who despises and challenges the longstanding heroine, Marsha. In October 2018 she released another Starstruck novel, The Handmaid's Secret, focusing on Marsha's friend Molly.

Starstruck has won awards, including first place in the National Excellence in Romance Fiction Award, first place in the I Heart Indie Contest, first place Book Buyers Best Contest, first place in the International Digital Awards, and second place in the Ancient City Romance Authors Readers Choice Award in the young adult category for each contest.

In January 2014, Hiatt was one of four authors of Scandalous Brides, an ebook "box set" compilation of four full length Regency Romance novels, with Hiatt's earlier published work, Scandalous Virtue, being her contribution. Scandalous Brides premiered at #12 on the USA Today bestsellers list. It then also reached #4 on the New York Times combined fiction print and ebook sales bestseller list.

In April 2015, Hiatt released her first three published books, Gabriella, The Cygnet and Lord Dearborn's Destiny, as an ebook compilation entitled Hiatt Regency Classics 1, 2 & 3. On April 23, 2015, the ebook reached #133 on the USA Today Bestsellers List. This compilation was followed in December 2015 with Hiatt Regency Classics 4, 5, & 6 consisting of Daring Deception, Christmas Bride and Azalea.

In February 2016, Hiatt returned to her Saint of Seven Seven Dials books, after a thirteen-year hiatus in the series, with the publication of Gallant Scoundrel.

== Philanthropy ==
Hiatt has been a member of the Romance Writers of America, a national non-profit genre writers association that provides networking and support to individuals seriously pursuing a career in romance fiction, since 1990. For many years, she participated in the organization's Readers for Life Literacy Autographing, which raised more than $300,000 for adult literacy.

== Awards and honors ==
In 1999, Hiatt won the American Book Readers Association Award for best romance novel for the book Scandalous Virtue.

== Titles ==
- StarTorn, a Starstruck novel – Dolphin Star Press, March, 2025
- Mindbound, a Starstruck novel – Dolphin Star Press, August, 2023
- Unraveling the Stars, a Starstruck novel – Dolphin Star Press, January 2022
- Yuletide Perils, a Starstruck novella – Dolphin Star Press, November 2021
- A Very Regency Christmas – Dolphin Star Press, November 2020
- Convergent, a Starstruck novel – Dolphin Star Press, November 2020
- A Taste for Scandal, a Seven Saints Hunt Club novel – Dolphin Star Press, June 2019
- The Handmaid's Secret, a Starstruck novel – Dolphin Star Press, October 2018.
- The Girl From Mars, a Starstruck novel – Dolphin Star Press, June 2017.
- Christmas Promises, a prequel to A Christmas Bride – Dolphin Star Press, December 2016.
- Fractured Jewel, A Starstruck Novella – Dolphin Star Press, July 2016.
- Gallant Scoundrel, a Saint of Seven Dials novel – Dolphin Star Press, February 2016.
- Hiatt Regency Classics 4, 5, & 6 – Dolphin Star Press, December, 2015
- Hiatt Regency Classics 1, 2 & 3 – Dolphin Star Press, April, 2015
- Starfall – Dolphin Star Press, February, 2015
- Regency Masquerades−Dolphin Star Press, October 2014
- Starbound – Dolphin Star Press, June 2014
- Starcrossed – Dolphin Star Press, January 2014
- Scandalous Brides – Sprigleaf, January 2014
- Starstruck – Dolphin Star Press, September, 2013
- Out of Her Depth – Bell Bridge Books, March 2013 (republished by Dolphin Star Press, January2024)
- The Runaway Heiress – Avon, June 2005
- Taming Tessa (later independently published as Tessa's Touch) – Avon, September 2004
- Wickedly Yours (later republished as Saintly Sins) – Avon, November 2003
- Innocent Passions – Avon, February 2003
- A Rebellious Bride (later republished as Noble Deceptions) – Avon, April 2002
- Rogue's Honor – Avon, July 2001
- Ship Of Dreams – HarperCollins, April 2000
- Scandalous Virtue – HarperCollins, June 1999
- Azalea – Harlequin "Regency Diamonds," August 1994
- Bridge Over Time – Harlequin Superromance, April 1994
- A Christmas Bride – Harlequin Regency, December 1993
- Daring Deception – Harlequin Regency, July 1993
- Lord Dearborn's Destiny – Harlequin Regency, February 1993
- The Ugly Duckling(later independently published as The Cygnet)—Harlequin Regency, September 1992
- Gabriella – Harlequin Regency, March 1992
