= Penelope Fletcher =

British author

- Born: 22 July 1988 (age 38); London, England
- Occupation: Author
- Writing career
- Language: English
- Period: 2010 – present
- Genres: Fantasy, paranormal romance
- Subject: Paranormal romance young adult fiction
- Notable work: Demon Girl
- Website: www.penelopefletcher.com

Penelope Fletcher (born 22 July 1988) is a British writer of paranormal romance and young-adult fantasy fiction. She was born in London and lives in the United Kingdom with her fiancé. Her books have been published digitally as eBooks on Amazon Kindle, Barnes & Noble Nook, and Apple iBooks. She writes erotic fiction under the pen name Hanna Lui.

In an interview with Wattpad, Fletcher mentioned her writing process involves typing where she "just keeps going until it feels like it's the end."

== Publications ==
Most of Penelope Fletcher's work is self-published.

=== Rae Wilder ===
The Rae Wilder novels are about a dystopian world in which humans are on the brink of extinction, threatened by magical demons such as vampires and fairies. They are aimed at the teen market. The titles of the books were changed after they were first published.

1. Glamour (Demon Girl) (October 2010)
2. Compel (Demon Day) (May 2011)
3. Enchant (Demon Dark) (October 2011)
4. Summon (DUE 2013)

=== Beautiful Damned ===
The Beautiful Damned novellas are a paranormal romance series aimed at the adult market.

1. Lunar Light (March 2011)
2. Moon Burn (Due Spring 2012)

=== Dark Creature ===
The Dark Creature books are a gothic romance series about vampires and lycanthropes.

1. Die, My Love (August 2011)
2. Bite, My Love (May 2012)

=== Dragon Souls ===
The Dragon Souls books are a fantasy romance series about a girl who helps a wounded dragon.

1. Smolder (December 2011)
2. Burn (Due December 2012)

=== Cosmic Lovely ===
The Cosmic Lovely books are a science-fiction romance series about a girl who is abducted by aliens and must find a way to save the Earth. They are aimed at young adults.

1. Chaos Theory (April 2012)
2. Flux Equinox (Due 2013)

=== Other books ===
- Aurora Spectre Chronicle (November 2011)
