= List of Harlequin Romance novels released in 1984 =

This is a list of Harlequin Romance novels released in 1984.

== Releases ==
Number	Title	Author	Date	Citations
# 2593	Somewhere To Call Home	Kerry Allyne	January 1984	
# 2594	Yours...Faithfully	Claudia Jameson	January 1984	
# 2595	Voyage Of The Mistral	Madeleine Ker	January 1984	
# 2596	The Chrysanthemum and the Sword	Annabel Murray	January 1984	
# 2597	Roses And Champagne	Betty Neels	January 1984	
# 2598	The Beachcomber	Marion Smith	January 1984	
# 2599	Hard to Handle	Jessica Ayre	February 1984	
# 2600	Brother Wolf	Joyce Dingwell	February 1984	
# 2601	Full Circle	Rosemary Hammond	February 1984	
# 2602	Return A Stranger	Margaret Mayo	February 1984	
# 2603	Night Of Possession	Lilian Peake	February 1984	
# 2604	Borrowed Girl	Alexandra Scott	February 1984	
# 2605	A Deeper Dimension	Amanda Carpenter	March 1984	
# 2606	Springs Of Love	Mary Moore	March 1984	
# 2607	Tomorrow...Come Soon	Jessica Steele	March 1984	
# 2608	The Ashby Affair	Lynsey Stevens	March 1984	
# 2609	House Of Memories	Margaret Way	March 1984	
# 2610	Wildtrack	Nicola West	March 1984	
# 2611	Man Of Gold	Kay Clifford	April 1984	
# 2612	Villa Of Vengeance	Annabel Murray	April 1984	
# 2613	The Silver Flame	Margaret Pargeter	April 1984	
# 2614	Come Love Me	Lilian Peake	April 1984	
# 2615	Castle Of The Lion	Margaret Rome	April 1984	
# 2616	Ride the Wind	Yvonne Whittal	April 1984	
# 2617	Corporate Lady	Rosemary Badger	May 1984	
# 2618	Greek Island Magic	Gloria Bevan	May 1984	
# 2619	The Face Of The Stranger	Angela Carson	May 1984	
# 2620	Pas De Deux	Kathryn Cranmer	May 1984	
# 2621	For Ever And A Day	Rosalie Henaghan	May 1984	
# 2622	A Lamp For Jonathan	Essie Summers	May 1984	
# 2623	A Modern Girl	Rebecca Flanders	June 1984	
# 2624	Kate's Way	Sara Francis	June 1984	
# 2625	Dear Green Isle	Annabel Murray	June 1984	
# 2626	Never Too Late	Betty Neels	June 1984	
# 2627	The Bonded Heart	Betsy Page	June 1984	
# 2628	Remember Me, My Love	Valerie Parv	June 1984	
# 2629	A Girl Called Andy	Rosemary Badger	July 1984	
# 2630	Maelstrom	Ann Cooper	July 1984	
# 2631	The Chequered Silence	Jacqueline Gilbert	July 1984	
# 2632	Desert Flower	Dana James	July 1984	
# 2633	Once More With Feeling	Natalie Spark	July 1984	
# 2634	Almost A Stranger	Margaret Way	July 1984	
# 2635	A Fierce Encounter	Jane Donnelly	August 1984	
# 2636	The Street Of The Fountain	Madeleine Ker	August 1984	
# 2637	The Road To Forever	Jeneth Murrey	August 1984	
# 2638	Starfire	Celia Scott	August 1984	
# 2639	No Alternative	Margaret Way	August 1984	
# 2640	The Tyzak Inheritance	Nicola West	August 1984	
# 2641	New Discovery	Jessica Ayre	September 1984	
# 2642	Connoisseur's Choice	Dixie McKeone	September 1984	
# 2643	Come Into The Sun	Barbara McMahon	September 1984	
# 2644	The Dreaming Dunes	Valerie Parv	September 1984	
# 2645	Season Of Forgetfulness	Essie Summers	September 1984	
# 2646	Carver's Bride	Nicola West	September 1984	
# 2647	Time To Forget	Kerry Allyne	October 1984	
# 2648	A Damaged Trust	Amanda Carpenter	October 1984	
# 2649	Moon Lady	Jane Donnelly	October 1984	
# 2650	Riviera Romance	Marjorie Lewty	October 1984	
# 2651	A Woman In Love	Lilian Peake	October 1984	
# 2652	Soul Ties	Karen Van	October 1984	
# 2653	Don't Call It Love	Lindsay Armstrong	November 1984	
# 2654	The Frozen Heart	Jane Donnelly	November 1984	
# 2655	Two Dozen Red Roses	Rosemary Hammond	November 1984	
# 2656	Polly	Betty Neels	November 1984	
# 2657	On Hill	Leigh Michaels	November 1984	
# 2658	A Place Called Rambulara	Margaret Way	November 1984	
# 2659	Touch Of Gold	Pamela Browning	December 1984	
# 2660	A Place of Wild Honey	Ann Charlton	December 1984	
# 2661	The Road	Emma Goldrick	December 1984	
# 2662	Candleglow	Amii Lorin	December 1984	
# 2663	Storm Warning	Alexandra Scott	December 1984	
# 2664	Golden Haven	Mary Wibberley	December 1984	
