= Chosen (Cast novel) =

2008 novel by P.C. Cast and Kristin Cast

- The first edition cover of Chosen
- Author: P.C. Cast; Kristin Cast
- Language: English
- Series: House of Night
- Genre: Young adult Paranormal romance
- Publisher: St. Martin's
- Publication date: March 4, 2008
- Publication place: United States
- Media type: Print (Paperback & Hardback); Audio CD
- Pages: 307
- ISBN: 978-0-312-36030-6
- OCLC: 156832359
- Preceded by: Betrayed
- Followed by: Untamed

Chosen is the third novel of the House of Night fantasy series, written by American authors P.C. Cast and Kristin Cast. The book was released on March 2, 2008, by St. Martin's Press, an extension of Macmillan Publishers. The book has been since translated into more than 20 other languages including French, Spanish, German and Chinese.

Zoey is plagued by a terrible secret: Neferet, the High Priestess of the Tulsa House of Night, has been reviving the fledglings who had rejected the Change to add them to her personal army. Among them is her best friend, Stevie Rae, and every second she grows further away from her humanity, but Zoey will fight for her even if she doesn't want it.

== Plot ==
Back at the House of Night, Zoey realizes that, as a leader of the Dark Daughters, she has to choose someone else to fill the position of Earth in her circle. Much to everyone else's displeasure, she chooses Aphrodite, when she manifests a new affinity for the Earth.

Zoey also feels more and more estranged from Erik, because of the lies she tells to hide her relationship with Loren. During the night Erik finishes the Change, she loses her virginity to Loren and Imprints with him, breaking her previous one with Heath. Erik walks in on them and angrily breaks up with Zoey. She pulls herself together and leaves to gather her friends, planning to tell them about Stevie Rae, to cast a circle and heal her. On the way, Zoey chances upon Loren and Neferet and hears him confess that Neferet had made him seduce Zoey, for her to become alienated from her closest friends, and that he actually loves Neferet.

Heartbroken, Zoey leaves to get Damien, the Twins and Aphrodite. She had planned to use the occasion to cure Stevie Rae and introduce her to her friends. Because of Loren's meddling, Stevie Rae arrives before Zoey has the chance to explain her to her friends and they feel betrayed, but agree to finish the ritual. When Zoey is about to invoke Earth, Stevie Rae attacks Aphrodite in a fit of jealousy and drinks from her and Changes into the first red adult vampyre. Aphrodite is terrified to discover that her own mark has disappeared and runs away through the secret exit with Stevie Rae after her, leaving Zoey alone with the rest of her friends.

Zoey does her best to explain and she manages to get them to listen until Erik shows up and reveals her infidelity and her relationship with Loren. This shatters Damien and the Twins' last bit of faith in her. On the way back she is seized by a series of spasms, and finds out much later that they came from her Imprint with Loren breaking as he died.

Acting from apparent grief at his loss, Neferet declares war on all humans. Zoey realizes that Neferet is lost to sense, pulls herself together and faces Neferet down after the council. During the confrontation Zoey begins to doubt herself. When she is unsure if she is strong enough to stand against Neferet on her own, she feels the strength of her elements and the tingle of her new marks and is confident in Nyx and the power she has been given. Afterwards, she heads to her dorm and finds that Erik witnessed her exchange with Neferet. He wants to believe her, but is still hurt because of Zoey cheating on him. Tiredly, with Nala in tow, Zoey heads to bed, but not before hearing her goddess whisper, "Believe in yourself, Daughter, and get ready for what is to come."

== Characters ==
- Zoey Redbird: The main protagonist of the series. She has an affinity for all five elements (air, fire, water, earth, and spirit), and is the only High Priestess to have ever been given that magnitude of power by the goddess Nyx. Zoey is also the youngest High Priestess in vampyre history.
- Nyx: The goddess of the vampyres and Kalona used to be her warrior that he loved to much and she banished him.
- Erik Night: A former fledgling and Zoey's ex-boyfriend, now the vampyre Tracker for Tulsa's House of Night. Erik has a talent for acting, and once won an international House of Night monologue competition. He and Shaunee later start seeing each other.
- Stevie Rae Johnson: Zoey's best friend, and the first red vampyre High Priestess in history. She also has an affinity for earth and is Rephaim's girlfriend later in the series.
- Neferet: The main antagonist and former High Priestess, now immortal consort of Darkness and witch queen of the Tsi Sgili. Neferet is initially introduced as a kind, loving mentor to Zoey, but is gradually revealed to be on the side of Darkness.
- Heath Luck: Zoey's human "almost-boyfriend", who cannot seem to stay away despite her best efforts. Their Imprint breaks twice: once when Zoey Imprints with Loren Blake, and again when Heath is killed by Kalona. Part of Heath's soul later returns in Aurox, the Vessel created by Neferet.
- Aphrodite LaFont: Former "hag from hell" and Zoey's enemy in the first book. Aphrodite starts as a rather bitchy and arrogant vampyre fledgeling. Aphrodite is later unmarked to save Stevie Rae and the two imprint briefly. Her visions remain in spite of losing her mark and becomes an oracle and prophetess. Gradually grows to trust Zoey and the rest of the nerd herd.
- Sylvia Redbird: Zoey's grandmother, a Cherokee Wise Woman. She owns a lavender farm and is often on hand to give Zoey advice and reassurance in the fight against Darkness.
- Loren Blake: The vampyre Poet Laureate and a professor at the House of Night, he flirts with Zoey and later Imprints with her, but is revealed to be Neferet's lover and puppet. Neferet kills him in Chosen when he begins to show real concern for Zoey.
- Erin Bates: A fledgling and member of the nerd herd with an affinity for water before she left to be with the evil red fledgling Dallas. Her body eventually rejects the Change and she dies.
- Shaunee Cole: A fledgling and member of the nerd herd with an affinity for fire. She is Erin Bates twin until she starts to grow her own personality much to Erin's dismay. Suffers the loss of her twin.
- Damien Maslin: A fledgling, member of the nerd herd with an affinity for air. Jack is his boyfriend until being murdered by Neferet. Damien eventually finds love again.
- Jack Twist - Damien's boyfriend
- Darius - A son of Erebus

== Reception ==
The third installment of the series received positive reviews.

"Through Zoey’s eyes readers are led into a world that’s getting more complicated by the minute, where friends and enemies can switch positions in a heartbeat. The remarkable Cast duo continues to build a world that you won’t soon forget!"(Romantic Times)

"Chosen, The House of Night series book 3, is like the cream in an Oreo cookie holding the two ends together. This story is gearing up for the final showdown between Zoey and Neferet and mother and daughter team, P.C. and Kristen Cast are setting the stage perfectly for this…Again, P.C. Cast is an auto-buy author for me and this series is also on that auto-buy list." (ParaNormal Romance reviews)
