= House of Night =

Series of fantasy novels by P. C. Cast and Kristin Cast

- House of Night; Marked; Betrayed; Chosen; Untamed; Hunted; Tempted; Burned; Awakened; Destined; Hidden; Revealed; Redeemed; House of Night: Other World; Loved; Lost; Forgotten; Found
- Author: P. C. Cast & Kristin Cast
- Country: United States
- Language: English
- Genre: Romance, fantasy, young adult fiction
- Publisher: St. Martin's Press, Atom/Little Brown
- Published: 2007–2014; 2017–present
- Media type: Print

House of Night is a series of young adult vampire-themed fantasy novels by American author P. C. Cast and her daughter Kristin Cast. It follows the adventures of Zoey Redbird, a 16-year-old girl who is "marked", becomes a fledgling vampyre and is required to attend the House of Night boarding school in Tulsa, Oklahoma. Books in the series have been on the New York Times Best Seller list for 63 weeks and have sold over seven million copies in North America, and more than ten million books worldwide, in 39 countries.

== Plot ==
Zoey and her friends face the usual teenage issues. Zoey keeps some secrets from her friends and gets in trouble with them, forcing her to consider the nature of friendship. Kristin Cast said that these moral dilemmas were included because "those are issues teenagers deal with... We're not afraid to discuss things that are actually happening." As with many contemporary vampire novels, exploration of human nature and social commentary forms a subtext. and Tsi Sgili are taken from real Cherokee legends. (Note: Much of the Kalona myth was apparently made up by the authors, since it refers to events a thousand years ago in Oklahoma, and until 1830, the Cherokee lived not in Oklahoma but in the region of New Echota, Georgia)

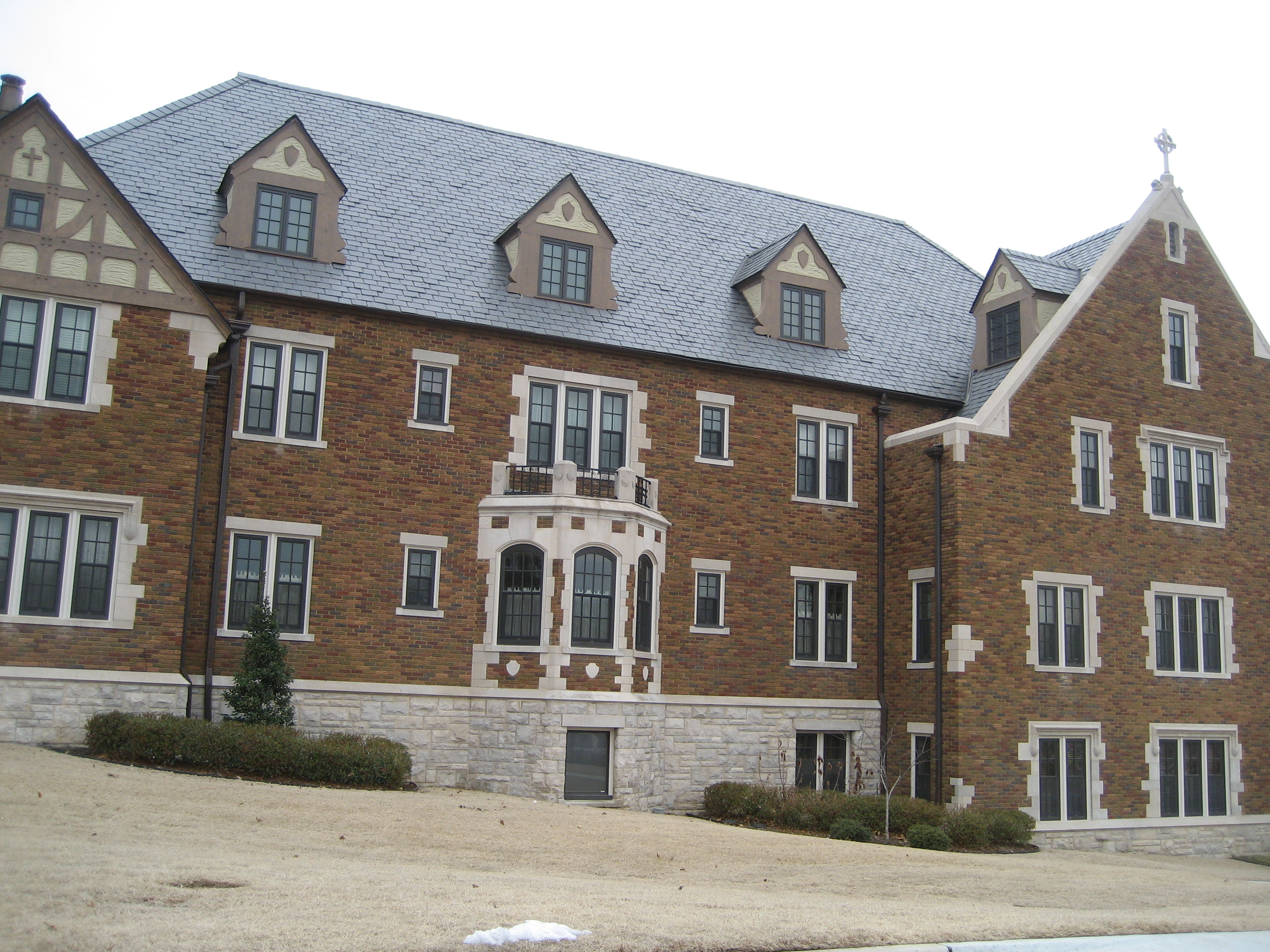
St. Joseph Monastery, Tulsa, the basis for the Benedictine Abbey in the series

== The setting ==
=== The Vampyre World ===
Instead of "vampire", the authors use the variant spelling "vampyre" throughout the series. This convention is also applied to the words "vampyric" and "vampyrism".

In the fictional world of House of Night, a small percentage of the world's teenagers are changed into vampyres when adolescent hormones trigger a strand of what is otherwise junk DNA. Fledglings are "marked" by a Tracker vampyre with a blue crescent-shaped tattoo on their foreheads; when they become full-fledged adult vampyres, this mark becomes solid blue, and is eventually elaborated upon with the addition of further blue 'tattoos', which extend over their forehead and cheeks, typically taking designs related to some aspect of their personality. Fledglings that die and then are later resurrected have their crescent tattoos turn red in place of the usual blue. Red fledglings appear to complete the change once they have made a choice to side with either good or evil, and their expanded tattoos are the same red. (Note: Zoey is the only fledgling to be "marked" with a filled-in mark; as the series progresses, she receives further tattoo-like designs around her cheeks, over her shoulders and across much of the rest of her body.) The marking of a fledgling, and the consequent gifts received as part of being a vampyre, are considered to be gifts from the goddess Nyx, the Greek personification of the night.

The change from human to vampyre takes four years, during which the vampyre teenagers, known as "fledglings", must attend one of the "House of Night" boarding schools, and must remain in constant proximity to adult vampyres, as otherwise the fledgling will die. As a result, fledglings rarely leave the schools in which they live. While at the House of Night boarding school, fledglings are required to take lessons in vampyre history, sociology, and in the powers gifted to them as part of their transition into an adult vampyre. However, one in ten fledglings die before completing the transition into adult vampyre, as their bodies reject the Change. Fledglings who do survive the Change into adulthood are physically stronger than most adult humans, with accelerated reflexes, enhanced dexterity, a heavily extended lifespan, and heightened senses, including night vision.

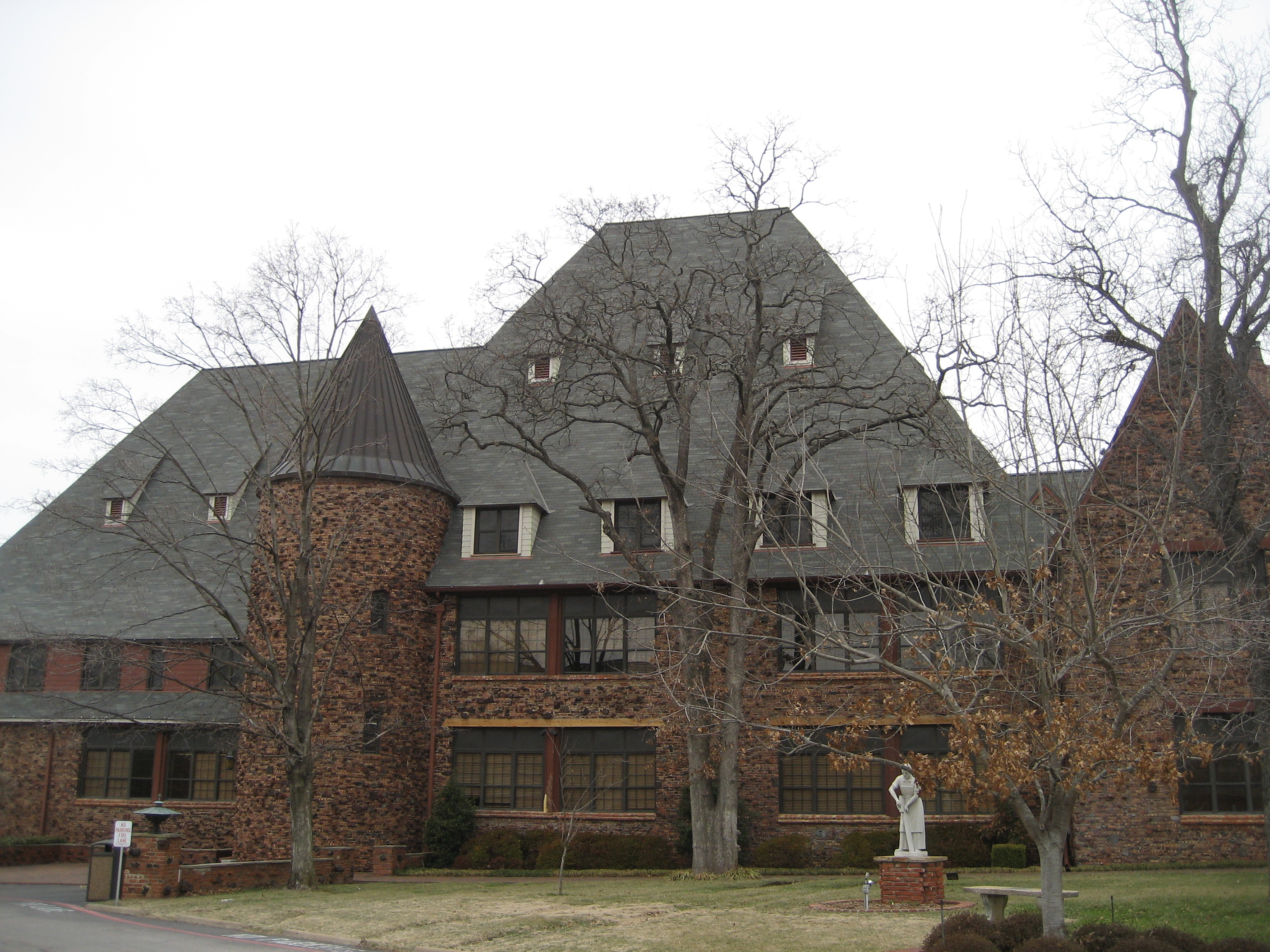
The House of Night, Tulsa (in real life, Cascia Hall)

Older fledglings and adult vampyres need to drink small quantities of human blood, but vampyres at the House of Night do not attack humans to get this, instead receiving donations from blood banks. The taking of blood is pleasurable for both human and vampyre, comparable to and described as better than sex or a drug rush within the series, and may lead to a strong emotional bond between the human and the vampyre, known as "Imprinting". An Imprint can be broken through death, the vampyre Imprinting upon another, or through mystical means; when an Imprint is broken, it causes considerable anguish for both the vampyre and the human.

The series has a strong religious setting, with both Christianity and the beliefs of the vampyres a common thread throughout. In the human world within the series, various faiths exist in opposition to or in support of the vampyres; the "People of Faith", a fictional Protestant Christian denomination, is highly intolerant of those they perceive to be in opposition to their beliefs, including the vampyres. (Note: In an interview, Cast stated that she modelled the People of Faith on "the worst fanatics of all religions", and not exclusively Protestantism.) Catholicism also plays an important role later in the series, with the fledglings joining forces with Catholic nuns against Kalona. The religious setting of the series gives it a strong moral perspective, as it is often enforced that Nyx gives vampyres and humans free will. Throughout the series, Zoey faces difficult decisions and commonly questions whether or not she has made the right choices, with one character dying as a result of her actions in Tempted. In Burned, a Manichaen view of the Universe is presented, in which Good battles Evil, and characters must choose which side to be on, with the black and white bulls, known as Light and Darkness respectively, introduced as representatives of these forces.

=== The Human World ===
The series is set in Tulsa, in a small and reclusive part of Midtown, with many locations in the series taken from real-life Tulsa itself. The House of Night campus is in the real life campus of Cascia Hall Preparatory School, and the climactic scene of the first book in the series takes place in the extensive gardens of the Philbrook Museum of Art. In the series, Zoey also sometimes travels off-campus to the real-life shops of nearby Utica Square, and several important confrontations take place in Utica Square's Starbucks coffee shop. Some of the novels' most dramatic scenes take place in a catacomb-like network of tunnels under downtown Tulsa, built by bootleggers during Prohibition; though a few such tunnels do indeed exist, and can be visited, they are far less extensive than the tunnels described in the series. The abandoned Art Deco train depot where the tunnels begin, however, is real, and is slated to become a concert hall.

The location of Aphrodite's parents' mansion, South 27th Place, is a real street, though the mansion itself is fictional. Though Aphrodite's father, Mr. LaFont, shares a similar name to former mayor of Tulsa Bill LaFortune, his character is not based on LaFortune himself. The Benedictine monastery to which Zoey and her friends flee in the series is real, known as St. Joseph Monastery. The devastating ice storm through which they flee was based on a real ice storm that hit Tulsa in December 2007. The climactic scene in Tempted takes place far from Tulsa, on San Clemente Island near Venice, called Isola di San Clemente in real life. The church at which the Vampyre High Council meets was built in 1131.

Much of Burned takes place on the Inner Hebrides island of Skye, in the palace of Sgiach, the vampyre queen. According to Scottish tradition, Sgiach (usually spelled Sgathach) was a princess many centuries ago, who ran the best warrior training school in Scotland. Princess Sgathach lived in Dunscaith Castle, which is today a ruin.

== Characters ==
The following lists a number of the characters in House of Night.

- Zoey Redbird: the main protagonist of the series. She has an affinity for all five elements (air, fire, water, earth, and spirit), and is the only High Priestess to have ever been given that magnitude of power by the goddess Nyx. Zoey is also the youngest High Priestess in vampyre history.
- Neferet: Main antagonist and former High Priestess, now immortal consort of Darkness and witch queen of the Tsi Sgili. Neferet is initially introduced as a kind, loving mentor to Zoey, but is gradually revealed to be on the side of Darkness.
- Aphrodite LaFont: Former "hag from hell" and Zoey's enemy in the first book. Aphrodite starts as a rather bitchy and arrogant vampyre fledgeling. Aphrodite is later unmarked to save Stevie Rae and the two imprint briefly. Her visions remain in spite of losing her mark and becomes an oracle and prophetess. Gradually grows to trust Zoey and the rest of the nerd herd.
- Stevie Rae Johnson: Zoey's best friend, and the first red vampyre High Priestess in history. She also has an affinity for earth and is Rephaim's girlfriend later in the series.
- Erin Bates: A fledgling and member of the nerd herd with an affinity for water before she left to be with the evil red fledgling Dallas. Her body eventually rejects the Change and she dies.
- Shaunee Cole: A fledgling and member of the nerd herd with an affinity for fire. She is Erin Bates twin until she starts to grow her own personality much to Erin's dismay. Suffers the loss of her twin. Girlfriend of Erik Night in Redeemed.
- Damien Maslin: A fledgling, member of the nerd herd with an affinity for air. Jack is his boyfriend until being murdered by Neferet. Damien eventually finds love again.
- Heath Luck: Zoey's human " almost-boyfriend", who cannot seem to stay away despite her best efforts. Their Imprint breaks twice: once when Zoey Imprints with Loren Blake, and again when Heath is killed by Kalona. Part of Heath's soul later returns in Aurox, the Vessel created by Neferet.
- Erik Night: A former fledgling and Zoey's ex-boyfriend, now the vampyre Tracker for Tulsa's House of Night. Erik has a talent for acting, and once won an international House of Night monologue competition. He and Shaunee later start seeing each other.
- James Stark: A red vampyre who is introduced in the 4th book and eventually becomes Zoey's main love interest as well as her Warrior and Guardian, and has an affinity for archery.
- Nyx: The goddess of the vampyres and Kalona used to be her warrior that he loved too much and she banished him.
- Kalona: Fallen immortal Guardian of Nyx. Father of Rephaim and the Raven Mockers. He was once a glorious winged immortal of Nyx as well as her warrior, but he grew jealous of his brother and was eventually deceived by Darkness, and was thus cast from the Otherworld by Nyx, an act that broke her heart. His wings turned black after this, reflecting the taint of Darkness in his soul.
- Darius: A Son of Erebus tasked with guarding Zoey. He later becomes Aphrodite's Warrior.
- Loren Blake: The vampyre Poet Laureate and a professor at the House of Night. He flirts with Zoey and later Imprints with her after having sex with her, but is revealed to be Neferet's lover and puppet. Neferet kills him in Chosen when he begins to show real concern for Zoey.
- Kramisha: A red fledgling with a gift for poetry who is named Zoey's Poet Laureate.
- Dragon Lankford: Anastasia's husband, the fencing instructor.
- Anastasia Lankford: Dragon's wife, the Spells, and Rituals professor.
- Sylvia Redbird: Zoey's grandmother, a Cherokee Wise Woman. She owns a lavender farm and is often on hand to give Zoey advice and reassurance in the fight against Darkness.
- Jack Twist: Damien's boyfriend and a member of the nerd herd, who has an unofficial affinity for technology. In Awakened, Neferet, needing a sacrifice for the white bull, chose Jack because he refused to revoke Nyx in favor of evil, and killed him, making it seem like an accident.
- Rephaim: Kalona's eldest and favorite Raven Mocker son. Later he becomes Stevie Rae's boyfriend, and is given a normal body in Awakened, but because of the mistakes he made in the past, is only normal by night. By day, he takes the form of a raven.
- Shaylin Ruede: A blind girl who is the first fledgling to be Marked red. When Erik Marks her, she is gifted with an affinity for True Sight, and later for water.
- Nisroc: Kalona's second eldest son and second most evolved, took care of his brothers while Kalona and Rephaim were away.

== Novels ==
=== House of Night ===
1. Marked (May 2007) – ISBN 9780312360269
2. Betrayed (October 2007) – ISBN 9780312360283
3. Chosen (March 2008) – ISBN 9780312360306
4. Untamed (September 2008) – ISBN 9780312379834
5. Hunted (March 2009) – ISBN 9780312577995
6. Tempted (October 2009) – ISBN 9780312609382
7. Burned (April 2010) – ISBN 9780312387969
8. Awakened (January 2011) – ISBN 9780312650247
9. Destined (October 2011) – ISBN 9780312387983
10. Hidden (October 2012) – ISBN 9781250041746
11. Revealed (October 2013) – ISBN 9780312594435
12. Redeemed (October 2014) – ISBN 9780312594442

=== House of Night: Other World ===
1. Loved (October 2017) – ISBN 9781538431122
2. Lost (July 2018) – ISBN 9781538440742
3. Forgotten (October 2019) – ISBN 9781982548056
4. Found (July 2020) – ISBN 9781982548100

=== Novellas ===
- Dragon's Oath (July 2011) – ISBN 9781250000231
- Lenobia's Vow (January 2012) – ISBN 9781250000248
- Neferet's Curse (February 2013) – ISBN 9781250000255
- Kalona's Fall (July 2014) – ISBN 9781250046116

=== Other related books ===
- The Fledgling Handbook 101 (October 2010) – ISBN 9780312595128
- The Nyx in the House of Night: Mythology, Folklore (June 2011) – BenBella Books, Inc. – ISBN 9781935618553
- House of Night: Legacy (July 2012) – Dark Horse Comics – ISBN 9781595829627
- Wisdom of the House of Night Oracle Cards: A 50-Card Deck and Guidebook (October 2012) – Ten Speed Press – ISBN 9780770433444

== Adaptations ==
=== Film adaptation ===
In November 2011, it was announced that the film rights to House of Night had been acquired by producer Samuel Hadida's production company, Davis Films, with Lionsgate having the distribution rights, with plans for five movies created, and an outline of the screenplay written. However, as of 2019, there were no known future plans for the movies; the contract for the rights to the movies expired in the fall of 2020. In February 2025, Rain Li is set to direct the film along with the novel's author P. C. Cast and her daughter Kristin to co-write and Samuel's brother Victor Hadida and Molly Hassell are producing the film reportedly, Highland Film Group picked up the rights and sold the film at the European Film Market in Berlin. In October 2026, it was announced that Johanna Watts has replaced Li as director and that filming would begin in early 2027.

=== Comic book adaptation ===
P.C. Cast announced on her website that a graphic book adaptation of the House of Night series, titled House of Night: Legacy, would be published in monthly issues by Dark Horse Comics starting the November 9, 2011. The comic book spanned five issues, each relating to a different element. The action takes place between Marked and Betrayed concerning Zoey's struggle to become a good leader for the Dark Daughters. To help her learn, Nyx places five tests in her way, each dealing with a story from The Fledgling Handbook 101. The drawings were done by Joëlle Jones, cover by Jenny Frison.

== Reception ==
The series has received generally good reviews, reaching 5th in the New York Times Children's Bestsellers list.

=== Accolades ===
- Romantic Times Reviewers' Choice Award for Marked (Young Adult Novel)
- Romantic Times Reviewers' Choice Award for Tempted (Best Young Adult Paranormal/Fantasy Novel)
- Goodreads Choice Award for Burned (Favorite Book, Young Adult Fantasy, Favorite Heroine)
- A nomination for Teen Read Award for Best series in 2010.

The sixth novel in the series, Tempted, went on sale in October, 2009 with a first printing of a million copies, entered the USA Today bestseller list that week at #1. In January, 2010, Gezeichnet, a German translation of Marked, reached the #1 spot on the Der Spiegel bestseller list. The seventh novel, Burned, was released on April 27, 2010, and like Tempted, entered the USA Today bestseller list at #1. Awakened, released in January, 2011, also entered the list at #1.

=== Bans and Challenges ===
In 2014, pastor Phillip Missick of King of Saints Tabernacle created a petition to ban the House of Night series as well as the Twilight series, and other vampire themed books aimed at teen audiences. He stated that he wanted the books "purged from the shelves" of the Austin Memorial Library in Cleveland, TX.

In 2009 Henderson Junior High School in Stephenville, Texas, banned the entire series from its libraries, including the books that had yet to be written for "sexual content and nudity".
