= Betrayed (Cast novel) =

2007 novel by P.C. Cast and Kristin Cast

- The first edition cover of Betrayed
- Author: P.C. Cast; Kristin Cast
- Language: English
- Series: House of Night
- Genre: Young adult Paranormal romance
- Publisher: St. Martin's
- Publication date: October 2, 2007
- Publication place: United States
- Media type: Print (Paperback & Hardback); Audio CD
- Pages: 354
- ISBN: 978-0-312-36028-3
- OCLC: 132681533
- Preceded by: Marked
- Followed by: Chosen

Betrayed is the second novel of the House of Night fantasy series, written by American authors P.C. Cast and Kristin Cast. The book was released on October 2, 2007, by St. Martin's Press, an extension of Macmillan Publishers. Since, it has been translated in more than 20 other languages, including Chinese, Portuguese and Romanian.

== Plot ==
Zoey has been a vampyre fledgling for only a month now and she already is the leader of the Dark Daughters and the local High Priestess in training. She has been chosen by a cat, called Nala, has a tight-knit group of friends and a claimed to be gorgeous maybe-boyfriend in Erik Night. The situation is stable when a strange string of murders among the ranks of local football players leads the police and the human media to the Tulsa House of Night.

At her first parent visitation, Zoey is reunited with her family for the first time in a month. With them comes her grandmother, but is saddened to notice the stiffness of her parents, which contrasts strongly with the loving and friendly behavior of Stevie Rae's mother. Neferet comes upon their meeting and is almost immediately engaged in a religious dispute by Zoey's stepfather. In the ensuing argument, Zoey's parents vow never to come to the House of Night again, and Neferet kicks them out.

The same night, Zoey witnesses Aphrodite being verbally abused by her parents and starts developing sympathy for her enemy. Later on, she chances upon Neferet scolding Aphrodite and is shocked by this new side of her mentor. That day, Neferet invites Zoey for a private dinner. Upon hearing that Zoey saw her and Aphrodite, she informs her that the latter's visions were no longer valid, as Nyx had withdrawn her gift, and advises Zoey to keep her distance.

Later on, while watching TV, Zoey learns of the death of one of the high school football players whom she knew and goes on a walk to clear her head. She chances upon a crying Aphrodite who claims to have had another vision, that included Zoey's grandmother. She asks for a favor for her help and asks Zoey to take an oath. Unwilling to risk her grandmother's life, she accepts and learns that Aphrodite has seen her grandmother in a car, stuck on a collapsing local bridge, at a precise time. Zoey calls her grandmother to tell her to stay at home and then she and her friends make a call to the police about a bomb on the bridge, to keep other people away from it, around the time it was set to fall. Aphrodite's vision turns out to be true, making Zoey begin to doubt Neferet.

When two of her ex-boyfriend's friends disappear and are found murdered, she begins to suspect Neferet has something to do with it, especially after witnessing her discussing the murders with "undead", supposedly deceased students in a dream. Meanwhile, Zoey must make decisions regarding her love life, as she is drawn to her ex-boyfriend Heath due to their Imprint, maintains a relationship with fledgling peer Erik Night and captures the interest of Poet Laureate and teacher Loren Blake.

Zoey reorganizes the Dark Daughters, now that she is in charge of them, but Neferet takes credit for most of her new ideas at the first new Dark Daughters ritual. Shortly after the ritual, her best friend Stevie Rae rejects the Change and dies. As Zoey grieves over Stevie Rae, she learns that Heath too has disappeared, following the two other murders. Using her Imprint, a connection formed when vampyres consume a person's blood, she is able to locate him and takes off to retrieve him.

She finds out that Heath is being held captive by "undead" fledglings. Using her elemental affinities, Zoey frees Heath, but also finds out that it was Neferet who changed the dying fledglings into the "undead" creatures – one of which is Stevie Rae. The fledglings had lost their humanity and reverted to an almost feral state. She runs away with Heath, vowing to return. At the school, Neferet attempts to erase Zoey's memory, but Zoey recovers her memory and starts hatching a plan to help her former best friend. Zoey now has to use her bravery to save her best friend.

== Characters ==
- Zoey Redbird: The main protagonist of the series. She has an affinity for all five elements (air, fire, water, earth, and spirit), and is the only High Priestess to have ever been given that magnitude of power by the goddess Nyx. Zoey is also the youngest High Priestess in vampyre history.
- Nyx: The goddess of the vampyres and Kalona used to be her warrior that he loved to much and she banished him.
- Erik Night: A former fledgling and Zoey's ex-boyfriend, now the vampyre Tracker for Tulsa's House of Night. Erik has a talent for acting, and once won an international House of Night monologue competition. He and Shaunee later start seeing each other.
- Stevie Rae Johnson: Zoey's best friend, and the first red vampyre High Priestess in history. She also has an affinity for earth and is Rephaim's girlfriend later in the series.
- Neferet: The main antagonist and former High Priestess, now immortal consort of Darkness and witch queen of the Tsi Sgili. Neferet is initially introduced as a kind, loving mentor to Zoey, but is gradually revealed to be on the side of Darkness.
- Heath Luck: Zoey's human "almost-boyfriend", who cannot seem to stay away despite her best efforts. Their Imprint breaks twice: once when Zoey Imprints with Loren Blake, and again when Heath is killed by Kalona. Part of Heath's soul later returns in Aurox, the Vessel created by Neferet.
- Aphrodite LaFont: Former "hag from hell" and Zoey's enemy in the first book. Aphrodite starts as a rather bitchy and arrogant vampyre fledgeling. Aphrodite is later unmarked to save Stevie Rae and the two imprint briefly. Her visions remain in spite of losing her mark and becomes an oracle and prophetess. Gradually grows to trust Zoey and the rest of the nerd herd.
- Sylvia Redbird: Zoey's grandmother, a Cherokee Wise Woman. She owns a lavender farm and is often on hand to give Zoey advice and reassurance in the fight against Darkness.
- Loren Blake: The vampyre Poet Laureate and a professor at the House of Night, he flirts with Zoey and later Imprints with her, but is revealed to be Neferet's lover and puppet. Neferet kills him in Chosen when he begins to show real concern for Zoey.
- Erin Bates: A fledgling and member of the nerd herd with an affinity for water before she left to be with the evil red fledgling Dallas. Her body eventually rejects the Change and she dies.
- Shaunee Cole: A fledgling and member of the nerd herd with an affinity for fire. She is Erin Bates twin until she starts to grow her own personality much to Erin's dismay. Suffers the loss of her twin.
- Damien Maslin: A fledgling, member of the nerd herd with an affinity for air. Jack is his boyfriend until being murdered by Neferet. Damien eventually finds love again.
- Jack Twist: Erik's roommate
- Detective Marx: Loren's eldest brother

== Reception ==
The book reached #30 in the USA Today Top 150 bestselling books, lasting for 58 weeks on the list.

"The Cast and Cast team is back and stirring up deep trouble in their beguiling supernatural world….The issues faced by these teens are not child's play, and the stakes are life and death." (Romantic Times)
