= Thea Harrison =

American author

- Born: Teddy Harrison
- Occupation: Writer
- Writing career
- Pen name: Thea Harrison / Amanda Carpenter
- Language: English
- Genres: Paranormal Romance; Science Fiction; Fantasy; Romance
- Notable work: Dragon Bound
- Notable awards: RITA award – Paranormal Romance; 2012 Dragon Bound Amazon Best Books of 2011, Romance; RT Book Reviews Seal of Excellence Winner, May 2011; RT Book Reviews Editor's Pick, Outstanding Novel of 2011; RT Editor Award Best Shapeshifter Romance 2013 RT Book Reviews Best Paranormal Worldbuilding 2015
- Website: theaharrison.com

Thea Harrison is the pen name of American author Teddy Harrison, who writes paranormal romance, sci-fi fantasy, and contemporary romance novels, including the New York Times and USA Today bestselling Elder Races series. Harrison has also written contemporary romance novels for Harlequin Mills & Boon under the pen name Amanda Carpenter.

== Early writing ==
In the 1980s and 1990s, Harrison {wrote for Harlequin Mills & Boon under the name Amanda Carpenter. The Amanda Carpenter romances have been published in more than ten languages, and have sold over a million and a half copies worldwide.

Fifteen of the Amanda Carpenter books were re-released as ebooks through 2021 and 2022.

== Work ==
Writing as Thea Harrison, her books have won numerous awards and appeared on the New York Times bestsellers list and the USA Today bestsellers list.

Her books have been published in multiple languages, including German, Italian, French, and Spanish.

Harrison has received a number of positive reviews for her characters and world building. For example, USA Today's HEA Blog stated, "Thea Harrison is always on my must-read list. Her heroes and heroines are complicated, hot and just plain fun!" A review from bookbinge.com states, "Harrison’s world-building is top notch".

The Washington Post has called her Elder Races series "fantastic." Of Dragon Bound (2011), the first novel in the Elder Races series, Publishers Weekly wrote, "Harrison goes beyond the usual vampires and werewolves to create an entertaining cast of supernatural characters." Booklist called it "an outstanding blend of romantic suspense and urban fantasy with great storytelling and world building." Publishers Weekly felt that new readers and old readers alike would "cheer" the protagonist of Oracle's Moon (2012).

In April 2020, Harrison announced she would be writing and releasing a set of four interconnected novellas featuring Dragos and Pia, the hero and heroine of her RITA award winning novel Dragon Bound (2011). Because she had previously retired the couple from future stories, this announcement was enthusiastically received by fans who had expressed their desire for more stories about the couple in a poll Harrison held on social media and through her newsletter. The first book, The Unseen, was released in 2020. In a February 2021 announcement to fans, Harrison revealed she was going on a writing and publishing hiatus for health reasons. As a result, plans for the novella series changed. The series was shortened to 2 novellas. The second and final novella, The Adversary, released in 2021.

== Bibliography ==
=== Elder Races Series Books ===
1. Dragon Bound (2011)
2. Storm's Heart (2011)
3. Serpent's Kiss (2011)
4. Oracle's Moon (2012)
5. Lord's Fall (2012)
6. Kinked (2013)
7. Night's Honor (2014)
8. Midnight's Kiss (2015)
9. Shadow's End (2015)

=== Elder Races Series Novellas ===
1. True Colors (2011)
2. Natural Evil (2012)
3. Devil's Gate (2012)
4. Hunter's Season (2012)
5. The Wicked (2013)
6. Dragos Takes a Holiday (2013)
7. Pia Saves the Day (2014)
8. Peanut Goes to School (2014)
9. Dragos Goes to Washington (2015)
10. Pia Does Hollywood (2015)
11. Liam Takes Manhattan (2015)
12. The Chosen (2018)
13. Planet Dragos (2018)
14. The Unseen (2020)
15. The Adversary (2021)

=== Elder Races Series Collections ===
1. Divine Tarot (2014)
2. Destiny’s Tarot (2014)
3. A Dragon’s Family Album (2014)
4. A Dragon's Family Album II (2017)
5. A Dragon's Family Album: Final Collection (2018)
6. The Elder Races Tarot Collection (2018)
7. The Elder Races: Complete Novella Bundle 2013-2018 (2018)

=== Game of Shadows Series ===
1. Rising Darkness (2013)
2. Falling Light (2014)

=== Moonshadow Series ===
1. Moonshadow (2016)
2. Spellbinder (2017)
3. Lionheart (2018)
4. The NYT Bestselling Moonshadow Box Set (2022)

=== American Witch ===
1. American Witch (2019)

=== Amanda Carpenter Romances ===
1. A Deeper Dimension (Rereleased 2021)
2. The Wall (Rereleased 2021)
3. A Damaged Trust (Rereleased 2021)
4. The Great Escape (Rereleased 2021)
5. Flashback (Rereleased 2021)
6. Rage (Rereleased 2021)
7. Reckless (Rereleased 2021)
8. Waking Up (Rereleased 2022)
9. Caprice (Rereleased 2022)
10. The Gift of Happiness (Rereleased 2022)
11. Rose-Coloured Love (Rereleased 2022)
12. Passage of the Night (Rereleased 2022)
13. Cry Wolf (Rereleased 2022)
14. A Solitary Heart (Rereleased 2022)
15. The Winter King (Rereleased 2022)

== Awards and reception ==
- 2012 - Romance Writers of America RITA Award, Paranormal Romance – Dragon Bound
