= Time-travel romance =

Subgenre of romantic fiction

Time-travel romance is a subgenre of romantic fiction associated with paranormal romance. Time-travel romance focuses on romantic love and includes an element of time travel. Time-travel romance stories may or may not have a happy ending. Jude Deveraux's A Knight in Shining Armor is one of the best known time-travel romance novels, famous for the lack of a happy ending. Time-travel romances feature at least one character transported to a time period which is unfamiliar to them. A recurring theme is the conflict of falling in love and subsequently the character must decide whether to stay in the alternate time or return to the time he or she came from.

Time-travel romance settings may vary, from a present-day character sent back to the past, as in Binding Vows by Catherine Bybee, or with a character from the past sent forward to the future, as in several books in the Highlander series by Karen Marie Moning. A common location theme in time-travel romance is Scotland, such as in the popular Outlander series. Although the focus of time-travel romance is the love story between the characters, there is always some mechanism of science fiction or magic involved to facilitate travel through time. Enchanted stones, magical jewelry, and time machines are all methods employed to send the character to the destination time period. Examples of authors specializing in this genre include Diana Gabaldon, Catherine Bybee, Karen Marie Moning, and Susanna Kearsley.

The term "timeslip romance" is sometimes used for a relational genre, at times more focused on nostalgia than romance, with examples of that form including Portrait of Jennie and Time and Again, although some definitions of timeslip romance do not require a romantic aspect.
