= Catherine Bybee =

American writer

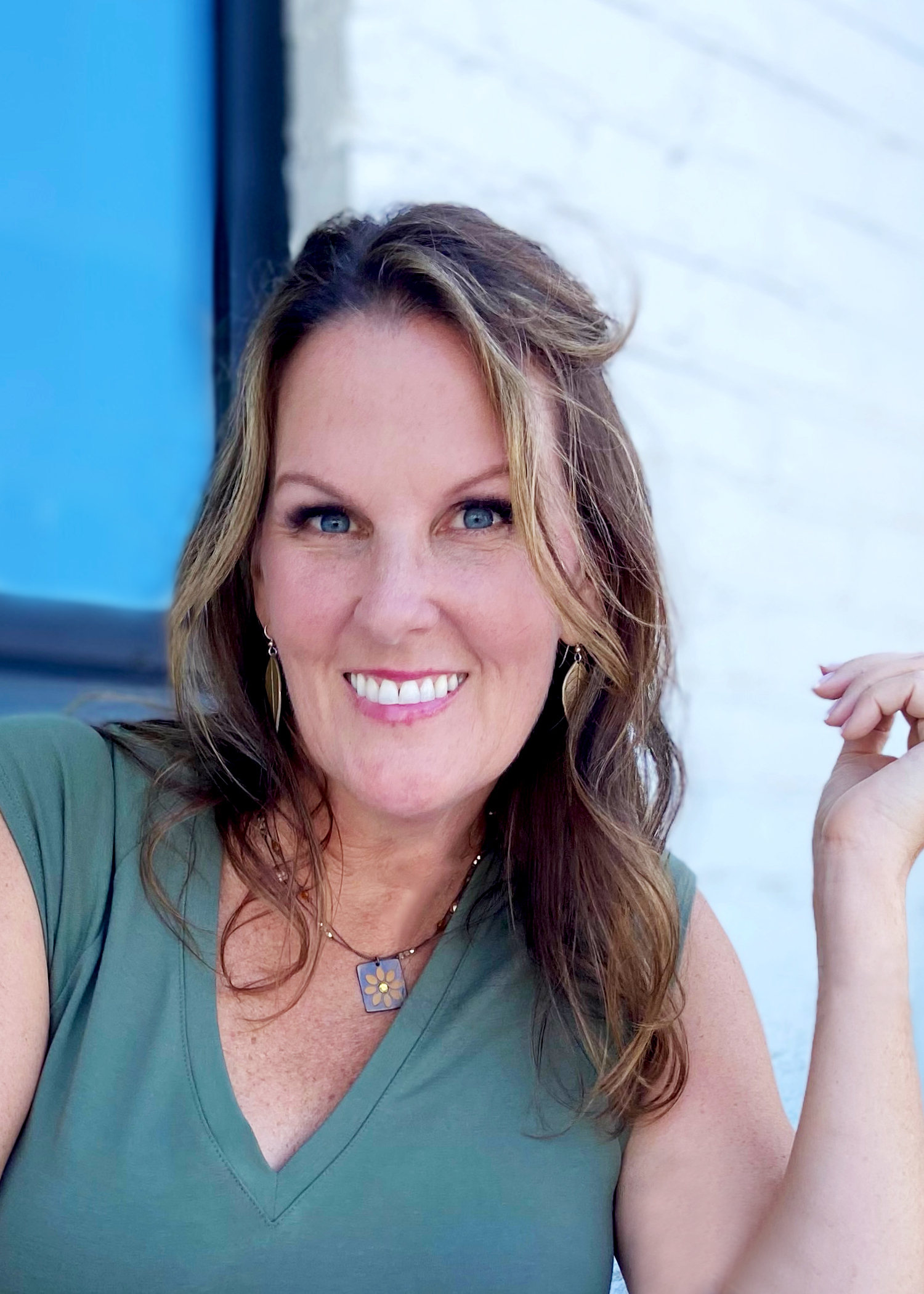
- Bybee in 2016
- Occupation: Novelist
- Children: 2
- Writing career
- Period: 2009–present
- Genres: Contemporary romance, paranormal romance, romantic suspense, women's fiction
- Website: www.catherinebybee.com

Catherine Bybee is an American author. She has written 45 books that have collectively sold more than 11 million copies and have been translated into more than twenty languages. Several of the books she authored have been on The New York Times and USA Today bestsellers lists.

Raised in Washington State, Bybee moved to Southern California in the hope of becoming a movie star. After growing bored with waiting tables, she returned to school and became a registered nurse, spending most of her career in urban emergency rooms. She now writes full time and has penned The Not Quite series, The Weekday Brides series, The Most Likely To series, and The First Wives series.

== Early life ==
Bybee was raised in Washington State, and is the survivor of child abuse and a teen who "graduated high school by the skin of my teeth." Romance novels became a way to escape reality, "Romance novels saved my life more than once, and I don't mean that figuratively."

Bybee moved to California in hopes of becoming an actress, but she eventually landed in nursing school and began working in urban emergency rooms. However, Bybee's nursing career was cut short when a fall, while helping a patient transfer from wheelchair to gurney, injured her back resulting in multiple surgeries over the course of seven years. It was during her recovery that she decided to start writing, "I didn't take a bunch of classes in writing. I couldn't spell my way out of a paper bag. But I had to learn."

Strong reader support has changed Catherine's life. She didn't grow up with money, and she says what she appreciates most is how success as an author has allowed her to improve other people's lives. She hired a full time assistant. "It's fabulous to actually employ people, for crying out loud. I hope that everyone can experience that."

== Career ==
Bybee published nine books through small press, but it was her tenth book, Wife by Wednesday, that became her breakout novel. On December 15, 2011, Wife by Wednesday entered the USA Today Bestsellers list at #35, staying on for seven weeks. On February 12, 2012, it entered the New York Times Bestsellers list at #18 for ebook fiction, and on February 26, 2012, was #13 for combined print and ebook. Wife by Wednesday was also the #1 best-selling Kindle Direct Publishing book, and #5 overall best-selling Kindle book, in December 2011. It went on to become the #11 overall best-selling Kindle book for 2012. Originally written for Harlequin, but rejected, Wife by Wednesday sold 300,000 copies by the time Amazon Publishing offered her a book deal.

The bestselling Weekday Brides series, developed from Wife by Wednesday, was bought by Montlake Romance in September 2012. In April 2012, Montlake also bought Bybee's second contemporary series, The Not Quite Series. Bybee has since sold over 11 million copies of her work and have been translated into more than 20 languages. She hit the #1 Wall Street Journal Bestseller spot with her novel, Making It Right, and continues to hit the "Amazon Top 100" and the "Wall Street Journal" with her contemporary releases.

== Bibliography ==
The Weekday Brides Series

- Wife By Wednesday (2011)
- Married By Monday (2012)
- Fiancé By Friday (2013)
- Single By Saturday (2014)
- Taken By Tuesday (2014)
- Seduced By Sunday (2015)
- Treasured By Thursday (2015)

The First Wives Series (A Weekday Brides Spinoff)

- Fool Me Once (2017)
- Half Empty (2018)
- Chasing Shadows (2018)
- Faking Forever (2019)
- Say It Again (2019)

The Richter Series (A First Wives Spinoff)

- Changing The Rules (2021)
- A Thin Disguise (2021)
- An Unexpected Distraction (2021)

The Not Quite Series

- Not Quite Dating (2012)
- Not Quite Mine (2013)
- Not Quite Enough (2013)
- Not Quite Forever (2014)
- Not Quite Perfect (2016)
- Not Quite Crazy (2018)

The Most Likely To Series

- Doing It Over (2016)
- Staying For Good (2017)
- Making It Right (2017)

The Creek Canyon Series

- My Way To You (2020)
- Home To Me (2020)
- Everything Changes (2020)

The D'Angelos Series

- When It Falls Apart (2022)
- Be Your Everything (2022)
- Beginning of Forever (2023)
- The Whole Time (2023)
- Maybe One Day (2025)

The Heirs Series

- All Our Tomorrows (2024)
- The Forgotten One (2024)
- No More Yesterdays (2025)

Queen Anne Hill Series

- Lead Me Home (June 2026)

The MacCoinnich Time Travel Series

- Binding Vows (2013)
- Silent Vows (2013)
- Redeeming Vows (2013)
- Highland Shifter (2013)
- Highland Protector (2013)

The Ritter Werewolves Series

- Before The Moon Rises (2010)
- Embracing The Wolf (2010)

Stand Alone Novels

- Possessive (2011)
- Soul Mate (2013)
