= P. C. Cast =

American romance/fantasy author

- Born: April 30, 1960 (age 66); Watseka, Illinois, U.S.
- Occupation: Writer
- Children: Kristin Cast
- Writing career
- Language: English
- Notable work: House of Night series (co-author)
- Website: www.pccastworlds.com

Phyllis Christine Cast (born April 30, 1960) is an American romance/fantasy author, known for the House of Night series she writes and her daughter Kristin Cast edits, as well as her own Goddess Summoning and Partholon book series.

== Career ==
On her own, P. C. Cast is known for her Goddess Summoning and Partholon book series. Her first book, Goddess by Mistake, originally published in 2001, won the Prism, Holt Medallion, and Laurel Wreath awards, and was a finalist for the National Readers' Choice Award; her subsequent books have also won a variety of prizes.

In 2005, she and her daughter began co-writing the House of Night series. In the wake of the current popularity of vampire fiction led by Stephenie Meyer's Twilight series, the Casts' books have enjoyed substantial and increasing critical and commercial success, and in March 2009, the fifth book in their series, Hunted, opened at number one on the best-seller lists of USA Today and The Wall Street Journal.

According to P. C. Cast, the concept for the House of Night novels came from her agent, who suggested the theme "vampire finishing school." The books take place in an alternative universe version of Tulsa, Oklahoma inhabited by both humans and "vampyres" (Cast uses this alternative spelling in the books, explaining it as a choice she made "just 'cause I like the way it looks"). The protagonist, Zoey Redbird, age 16, is "marked" as a "fledgling" and moves to the "House of Night" school to undergo her transformation.

In November 2008, Variety reported that producers Michael Birnbaum and Jeremiah S. Chechik had obtained an option to acquire the motion picture rights in the House of Night series. No film resulted from this, and in November 2011, it was announced that the film rights had been acquired by producer Samuel Hadida's company, Davis Films.

== Personal life ==
Born in Watseka, Illinois, Cast now lives in Oregon. She also lived in Tulsa where she taught English at South Intermediate High School in Broken Arrow and where her daughter was a student at the University of Tulsa.

== Influence ==
One of Cast's former students is horror journalist and novelist Preston Fassel, who calls Cast his "earliest writing mentor" and cites her as an influence on his novel Our Lady of the Inferno.

== Published works ==
=== Goddess Summoning ===
1. Goddess of the Sea, Berkley, 2003 (ISBN 0-425-19279-2).
2. Goddess of Spring, Berkley, 2004 (ISBN 0-425-19749-2)
3. Goddess of Light, Berkley, 2005 (ISBN 0-425-20196-1)
4. Goddess of the Rose, Berkley, 2006 (ISBN 0-425-20891-5)
5. Goddess of Love, Berkley, 2007 (ISBN 0-425-21528-8)
6. Warrior Rising, Berkley, 2008 (ISBN 0425221377)
  - Goddess of Troy, 2011 (ISBN 0-749-95361-6) [Reissue of Warrior Rising]
7. Goddess of Legend, Berkeley, 2010 (ISBN 0-425-22816-9)

=== Partholon ===
The Divine Series (also known as the Partholon Series) was Cast's earliest work, with the first entry, Goddess by Mistake, published in 2001 by the independent press Hawk Publishing. The series follows Shannon Parker, a high school English teacher from Oklahoma who swaps places with Rhiannon, a High Priestess of the goddess Epona from Partholon, a quasi-Greco-Celtic parallel world/dimension populated by humans, centaurs, and monsters known as Fomorians. Following Cast's later success, the original entry was rereleased under the title Divine by Mistake, and followed by a sequel, Divine by Choice, in 2006. Two further entries in the series followed in 2007 and 2009.

1. Divine by Mistake (ISBN 0-373-80247-1) or Goddess by Mistake, August 28, 2001
  - Elphame's Choice (ISBN 0-373-80213-7), November 24, 2004
  - Brighid's Quest (ISBN 0-373-80242-0), November 29, 2005
2. Divine by Choice (ISBN 0-373-80251-X), November 21, 2006
3. Divine by Blood (ISBN 0-373-80291-9), August 28, 2007
4. Divine Beginnings (ISBN 9781426845376), October 1, 2009 [Series Prequel]

=== House of Night ===
1. Marked, St. Martin's Press (ISBN 9780312360269) May 1, 2007
2. Betrayed, St. Martin's Press (ISBN 978-0-312-36028-3) October 2, 2007
3. Chosen, St. Martin's Press (ISBN 9780312360306) March 4, 2008
4. Untamed, St. Martin's Press (ISBN 9780312379834) September 23, 2008
5. Hunted, St. Martin's Press (ISBN 9780312379827) March 10, 2009
6. Tempted, St. Martin's Press (ISBN 9780312567484) October 27, 2009
7. Burned, St. Martin's Press (ISBN 9780312606169) April 27, 2010
8. Awakened, St. Martin's Press (ISBN 9780312650247) January 4, 2011
  - Dragon's Oath, St. Martin's Press (ISBN 9781250000231) July 12, 2011 [Novella]
9. Destined, St. Martin's Press (ISBN 9780312650254) October 25, 2011
  - Lenobia's Vow, St. Martin's Press (ISBN 9781250000248) January 31, 2012 [Novella]
10. Hidden, St. Martin's Press (ISBN 9780312594428) October 16, 2012
  - Neferet's Curse, St. Martin's Press (ISBN 9781250000255) February 19, 2013 [Novella]
11. Revealed, St. Martin's Press (ISBN 9781250061409) October 15, 2013
  - Kalona's Fall, St. Martin's Press (ISBN 9781250046116), July 29, 2014 [Novella]
12. Redeemed, St. Martin's Press (ISBN 9781250055439), October 14, 2014

==== House of Night: Other World ====
1. Loved, Blackstone Publishing (ISBN 9781538507568), July 11, 2017
2. Lost, Blackstone Publishing (ISBN 9781982546472), July 10, 2018
3. Forgotten, Blackstone Publishing (ISBN 9781982546472), October 29, 2019
4. Found, Blackstone Publishing (ISBN 9781665079525), July 7, 2020

==== Related Books ====
- The Fledgling Handbook or The Fledgling Handbook 101, St. Martin's (ISBN 9780312595128) October 26, 2010
- Nyx In The House Of Night, BenBella Books (ISBN 9781935618553) June 7, 2011
- House of Night: Legacy, Dark Horse Comics (ISBN 9781506707174), July 10, 2021

=== Time Raiders ===
- The Avenger (ISBN 0373285965), October 1, 2009

=== Tales of a New World ===
1. Moon Chosen (ISBN 9781250100726), October 18, 2016
2. Sun Warrior (ISBN 9781250100757), October 17, 2017
3. Wind Rider (ISBN 9781250100788), October 16, 2018

=== Dysasters ===
1. The Dysasters, February 26, 2019
2. The Rage of Storms, TBA

==== Dysasters: Graphic Novel ====
1. The Dysasters: A Graphic Novel, Wednesday Books (ISBN 9781250268778), February 25, 2020

=== Sisters of Salem ===
1. Spells Trouble, St. Martin's (ISBN 9781250765642), May 25, 2021
2. Omens Bite, St. Martin's (ISBN 9781250765666), April 5, 2022
3. Hex You
- Boudicca: A Novel, HarperCollins (ISBN 9780063294974), January 21, 2025

=== Anthologies and collections ===
After Moonrise, Harlequin (ISBN 9780373776481), October 23, 2012

- "Possessed" by P. C. Cast
- "Haunted" by Gena Showalter

==== Mysteria ====
Mysteria, Berkley (ISBN 9780425211069), July 5, 2006

- "Mortal in Mysteria" by Susan Grant
- "Alone Wolf" by MaryJanice Davidson
- "The Witches of Mysteria and the Dead Who Love Them" by Gena Showalter
- "Candy Cox and the Big Bad (Were)Wolf" by P. C. Cast

Mysteria Lane, Berkley (ISBN 9781101207413), October 7, 2008

- "Disdaining Trouble" by MaryJanice Davidson
- "The Nanny from Hell" by Susan Grant
- "A Tawdry Affair" by Gena Showalter
- "It's In His Kiss" by P. C. Cast

Mysteria Nights, Berkley (ISBN 9780425241738), July 5, 2011 [Omnibus Reissue]

- Collects the eight previous stories collected in both Mysteria and Mysteria Lane.

Accidental Magic, Berkley (ISBN 9780425263709), September 4, 2012

- Collects both novellas "Candy Cox and the Big Bad (Were)Wolf" and "It's In His Kiss" by author P. C. Cast

==== Love Stories with Bite, Edited by P. C. Cast ====
Immortal: Love Stories with Bite, BenBella Books (ISBN 9781933771922), August 1, 2008

- "Haunted Love" by Cynthia Leitich Smith
- "Amber Smoke" by Kristen Cast
- "Dead Man Stalking" by Rachel Caine
- "Table Manners" by Tanith Lee
- "Changed" by Nancy Holder
- "Blue Moon" by Richelle Mead
- "Free" by Claudia Gray

Eternal: More Love Stories with Bite, BenBella Books (ISBN 978-1935618010), November 2, 2010

- "Bloodshed" by Claudia Gray
- "Say Yes" by Lili St. Crow
- "The Other Side" by Heather Brewer
- "Letters to Romeo" by Nancy Holder
- "Drama Queen’s Last Dance" by Rachel Caine
- "Thief" by Jeri Smith-Ready
