= Kristin Cast =

American author

- Born: November 4, 1986 (age 39); Japan
- Occupations: Editor, novelist
- Relatives: P. C. Cast (mother)
- Writing career
- Language: English
- Years active: 2009–present
- Genres: Young adult fantasy, young adult science fiction, young adult contemporary
- Subjects: Vampires, boarding schools, witches, viruses
- Notable works: House of Night series (editor); Sisters of Salem series (co-author)
- Website: www.kcastauthor.com

Kristin F. Cast (born November 4, 1986, in Japan) is an American author of young adult books and graphic novels, best known for the House of Night series and Sisters of Salem series, written with her mother, P. C. Cast.

== Early life ==
Cast was born on an air force base in Japan, and raised in Oklahoma.

Cast graduated from Broken Arrow Senior High School in 2005. She's explored tattoo modeling and broadcast journalism.

== Personal life ==
Cast is biracial and has Nigerian ancestry. Some of her favorite authors are Pintip Dunn, Karin Slaughter, Nic Stone, VE Schwab, Caleb Roehrig, Justin Cronin, and Emily Suvada. She's a fan of the TV show True Blood.

She's open about having battled with addiction in her 20s and struggling with mental health issues. She's autistic and has OCD. Cast lives in Portland, Oregon.

== Career ==
Cast has been writing stories since 2005. As of September 2020, Cast and her mother have created more than 20 books together. She adapted their novel The Dysasters into a graphic novel and stated plans for more graphic novel scripts during an interview with Books-a-Million in 2020.

=== Co-authored with P. C. Cast ===
==== House of Night series (2007–2014) ====
In 2007, the House of Night series began with the publishing of its first book, Marked. It was created by Kristin and her mother, P. C. Cast, with Kristin beginning when she was 19 years old. Kristin was an editor for the series. The last book of the series, Redeemed was published in 2014.

===== Reception =====
The first book, Marked, was criticized for its overreliance on teen slang by Publishers Weekly, who also noted that it may appeal to teenagers.

The ninth book, Destined, published by St. Martin's Press in 2011, was criticized for its "cringeworthy" dialogue by Kirkus Reviews, though ultimately deemed not disappointing for fans of the series.

The tenth book, Hidden, published by St. Martin's Press in 2012, was #10 on the Publishers Weekly bestseller list in 2012, with ~27,000 units sold.

The twelfth and final book, Redeemed, was praised by Kirkus Reviews for its consistent theme throughout the series and said to be expected to resonate with fans "one last time."

===== Adaptation =====
Rights to the series had been optioned by Empire Pictures for a couple years, with a screenplay by Kent Dalian.

In 2019, it was announced that Don Carmody and David Cormican, producers of the Shadowhunters television series, would create a House of Night live-action television show.

===== Other =====
In 2011, Cast mentioned that she was in the process of creating a House of Night fashion line. As of 2014, the House of Night series has spent 152 weeks on The New York Times series bestseller list.

==== Sisters of Salem series (2021–2022) ====
The first novel, Spells Trouble, about twin witches about to be initiated into their full power, was published by Wednesday Books in 2021. Cast says that she always incorporates her own experiences into the characters she writes, but in Spells Trouble in particular, she channeled feelings of inadequacy and rage for the main character Hunter.

===== Reception =====
Kirkus Reviews called the first novel, Spells Trouble, "only for hardcore fans of the authors."[21] Publishers Weekly criticized the novel for its references to Native Americans as "magical conduits" and "out of place" sex scenes.[22] It debuted on the New York Times-bestseller list at #8.[23]

Kirkus Reviews called the third novel, Hex You, "a rushed ending to a witchy trilogy."[24]

=== Co-authored with Pintip Dunn ===
In October 2022, it was announced that Cast would co-author Seasick, a dual-POV contemporary, locked-door mystery thriller about former friends and affluent classmates out on a celebratory yacht trip. The novel was published in summer 2024 by Delacorte Press.

==== Reception ====
Kirkus Reviews described the novel as "An intriguing but ultimately lackluster whodunit," criticizing it as being "weighed down by weak prose and wooden dialogue."

=== Solo projects ===
==== The Escaped series (2015–2020) ====
In 2014, Cast signed a five-book deal with Diversion Books for a series called The Escaped. In 2015, she released the first book of the series, Amber Smoke.

===== Reception =====
Reviews for the series were mostly negative. Publishers Weekly said about the first book, Amber Smoke, "All but the most diehard paranormal fans will be turned off by the weak writing, uneven storytelling, and lackluster chemistry."

The second book, Scarlet Rain, was criticized by Publishers Weekly for "obvious foreshadowing, inconsistent pacing, and awkward dialogue" that in their opinion turned "reading this short novel into a slog."

==== The Key to Fear series (2020–2021) ====
The Key to Fear, a dystopian YA novel about a corporation protecting citizens from a sinister disease, is her first solo project was published by Blackstone in 2020 Cast says she's been interested in viruses since eighth grade and was inspired to write the novel upon seeing a logo across the street in Portland. A sequel, The Key to Fury, was released in April 2022.

===== Reception =====
Though the first novel was included in awards and several roundups, reviews were mostly negative. Kirkus Reviews criticized it for not bringing anything new to the genre, despite publishing during the COVID-19 pandemic and thus being timely. Publishers Weekly noted that while Cast successfully managed to create an atmosphere of unease, the worldbuilding and characters did not seem developed enough. The Key to Fear was a finalist for the 2020 Voice Arts Award, a Publishers Weekly Pick of 2020 Pandemic Novels for Young Readers, a Gizmodo Pick of New SFF & Horror Books, and a Tor.com Pick of the Month.

The Key to Fury received mixed reviews, with Kirkus Reviews calling it "strictly for fans of the first book."

== Works ==
=== House of Night series ===
Co-created with P. C. Cast

1. Marked, St. Martin's Press (ISBN 9780312360269) May 1, 2007
2. Betrayed, St. Martin's Press (ISBN 978-0-312-36028-3) October 2, 2007
3. Chosen, St. Martin's Press (ISBN 9780312360306) March 4, 2008
4. Untamed, St. Martin's Press (ISBN 9780312379834) September 23, 2008
5. Hunted, St. Martin's Press (ISBN 9780312379827) March 10, 2009
6. Tempted, St. Martin's Press (ISBN 9780312567484) October 27, 2009
7. Burned, St. Martin's Press (ISBN 9780312606169) April 27, 2010
8. Awakened, St. Martin's Press (ISBN 9780312650247) January 4, 2011
  - Dragon's Oath, St. Martin's Press (ISBN 9781250000231) July 12, 2011 [Novella]
9. Destined, St. Martin's Press (ISBN 9780312650254) October 25, 2011
  - Lenobia's Vow, St. Martin's Press (ISBN 9781250000248) January 31, 2012 [Novella]
10. Hidden, St. Martin's Press (ISBN 9780312594428) October 16, 2012
  - Neferet's Curse, St. Martin's Press (ISBN 9781250000255) February 19, 2013 [Novella]
11. Revealed, St. Martin's Press (ISBN 9781250061409) October 15, 2013
  - Kalona's Fall, St. Martin's Press (ISBN 9781250046116), July 29, 2014 [Novella]
12. Redeemed, St. Martin's Press (ISBN 9781250055439), October 14, 2014

=== The Escaped series ===
- Amber Smoke, Diversion Publishing, 2015 (ISBN 978-1-62681-553-7)
- Scarlet Rain, Diversion Publishing, 2016 (ISBN 978-1-62681-894-1)
- Cerulean Sea, Diversion Publishing, 2020 (ISBN 9781635760484)

==== The Escaped novella ====
- The Scent of Salt & Sand, Diversion Publishing, 2016 (ISBN 978-1682303436) (between books 2 and 3 of The Escaped)

=== Sisters of Salem series ===
- Spells Trouble, Wednesday Books, 2021 (ISBN 978-1250765635)
- Omens Bite, Wednesday Books, 2022 (ISBN 9781250765666)

=== The Key series ===
1. The Key to Fear, Blackstone Publishing, 2020
2. The Key to Fury, Blackstone Publishing, 2022

=== Moonstruck series ===
with P.C. Cast

1. Draw Down the Moon, St. Martin's Publishing Group, 2024
2. Give Up the Night, St. Martin's Publishing Group, 2025

=== Towerfall series ===
1. The Empress, Sourcebooks, 2025
2. The Lovers, Sourcebooks, 2026
3. Fortune, Sourcebooks, 2026

=== Other novels ===
- The Dysasters, Wednesday Books, 2019 (ISBN 978-1-250-14104-0), with P.C. Cast
- Sugar & Snowflakes, Camellia Lane, 2025
