= Angela Knight (author) =

American author of mostly erotic fantasy

- Occupation: Novelist
- Writing career
- Period: 1996–present
- Genres: Fantasy, erotica
- Website: www.angelasknights.com

Angela Knight is an American author of mostly erotic fantasy. She is the author of the Mageverse series as well as other books across the romance fantasy genre.

== Personal life ==
Angela Knight is a pen name for South Carolina native Julie Woodcock. As of 2004 she resides in Spartanburg, South Carolina with her husband, Michael, who is a police detective and their adult son, Anthony.

== Career ==
Angela Knight often credits her writing career to a short story called "The Mouse that Went to the Moon" which she wrote in pencil and illustrated in crayon at nine years old. She also states that her love for the romance genre came from the novel, The Wolf and the Dove by Kathleen Woodiwiss. She began her writing career as a journalist in South Carolina. She was a newspaper reporter in South Carolina, under her real name for ten years, as Julie Woodcock. Knight (Woodcock) worked for the Spartanburg Herald-Journal writing stories from "Pathologist suspended amid sex allegations" to "McDonald's has served Spartanburg for 40 years." Through her journalism work she was recognized for her writing, winning several awards from the South Carolina Press Association over the course of her tenure at the newspaper.

Angela Knight's first known published work outside of journalism was a comic book she wrote in 1986 called "Cycops" which ran for three issues. Knight had planned and already illustrated 15 volumes, but it was cut by publisher. Even today she uses these illustration and drawing skills to work on her book covers, which are 3D models that she designs. Knight even completed the cover art for Elizabeth Jewell's, Dark Callings in 2007.

In 1996, she discovered Red Sage Publishing, a small press publishing house. Her first romance story was published with them under the Secrets: The Best in Women's Sensual Romance, Vol. 2 series alongside Bonnie Hamre, Susan Paul, Doreen Delsalvo. During her time with Red Sage, Angela Knight wrote a few more novellas. Angela Knight was also included in, Secrets: The Best in Women's Sensual Fiction, Vol. 3, Secrets: The Best in Women's Erotic Romance, Vol. 6, Secrets: The Best in Women's Sensual Fiction, Vol. 7, Secrets: The Best in Women's Erotic Romance, Vol. 11, Secrets: The Best in Women's Erotic Romance, Vol. 14. Angela Knight while in-between short stories for the Secrets collections, also wrote a short story for the Ellora's Cavemen: Tales from the Temple II anthology. Angela Knight also published one full novel underneath Red Sage Publishing LLC called The Forever Kiss, a western inspired vampire novel, and an introduction to Angela Knight's writing style.

During her time at Red Sage Publishing, Knight's editor Cindy Hwang had asked her if she would be interested in being picked up by Berkley Publishing and Angela Knight said yes.

Berkley Publishing is a subsidiary branch of Penguin Random House, another much larger publishing company. Angela Knight's first published story, "Seduction's Gift" with Berkeley was in their Hot Blooded Collection alongside Christine Feehan, Maggie Shayne, and Emma Holly. She later republished "Forever Kiss" as a novella which is an adaptation of the same novel published with Red Sage. After this, Angela Knight went on to publish Master of the Night which was the official start of her Mageverse series which spanned across 10 novels and 6 novellas in various anthology collections. She also published her series The Time Hunters/Jane's Warlord a further 3 novels and 4 novellas with Berkley.

During her time at Berkley, Angela Knight had a brief stint with Loose ID publishing where she published three short stories and novellas in different collections. Most notably her work with Loose ID, was a novella in Romance at the Edge: In Other Worlds. She also republished "Stranded" which is a novella underneath them. With Loose ID, she also wrote and published, Passionate Ink: A Guide to Writing Erotic Romance which is a novel providing tips and a guideline for a writer to pen their own erotica novel.

Currently she is signed with Changeling Press LLC, and is still an active author within the erotica sphere. With them she has published the Arcane Talent series which consists of 6 novels. She has also published the Mothership Rangers series. Alongside of these series, Angela Knight has also published a few standalone novels with them with her most recent release being Invisible Monsters in November 2025, with another new release planned for early January 2026.

== Series ==
Angela Knight's Work is primarily focused on writing erotica series. Usually her work revolves around normal women dealing with extraordinary worlds and circumstances. Angela Knight herself says, "I like starting with a premise nobody else has used, then building an entire world around it with its own laws and social problems. I love showing my protagonists struggling with love and survival in worlds like that."

Angela Knight's Mageverse series is a vampire erotica retelling inspired by the Knights of the Roundtable. In the novels, we follow different characters all connected to different knights, mostly dealing with Morgana Le Fay. The series was Knight's longest running series which ran for twelve years across ten novels and six novellas.

Angela Knight's Merlin's Legacy series is a sequel series to the Mageverse novels. It takes place within the same universe of the originals, but it is set farther into the future. It still features the series ran for six novels across three years.

The Arcane Talents series follows a series of different couples. The novels revolve around the romance between the main female characters and their mates, magical men who all possess a "spirit animal" which allows them to shapeshift. The series ran for six novels across six years.

Angela Knight's Forever Kisses series is a collection of novellas published alongside of her first novel with the same name. The stories tackle Knight's usual romance themes of fantasy erotica. It is one completed novel, and five novellas.

The Graven Gods series by Angela Knight centers around struggling novelist Summer St. Clare who has turned her childhood imaginary friend Paladin into the lead detective in her novel series. Things take a turn when he is no longer not so imaginary, and becomes a steady figure in her life. The series is currently one novel, and it is Angela Knight's only self-published novel.

Angela's Knight's Time Hunters series is a futuristic erotica focusing on Jane Colby. Jane is a crime reporter who is marked for death, at least until a warlord sent from the future arrives to protect her. This series ran for three novels and four novellas.

The Mothership Rangers series is another futuristic/fantasy erotica series. This set of novels covers ideas from aliens, superhuman, and BDSM. Currently, the series has run for two novels, with the most recent release being in 2025.

== Bibliography ==
Mageverse Series
Title	Anthology (If Applicable)	Series Order	Year Published
The Once and Future Lover	Wicked Games	0.25	2014
Seduction's Gift	Hot Blooded	0.5	2005
Master of the Night		1	2004
Galahad	Bite	1.5	2004
Master of the Moon		2	2005
Master of Wolves		3	2006
"Moon Dance"	Over The Moon	3.5	2007
Master of Swords		4	2006
Master of Dragons		5	2007
Vampire's Ball	Hot for the Holidays	5.5	2009
Master of Fire		6	2010
Master of Smoke		7	2010
Master of Shadows		8	2011
Master of Darkness		9	2012
Oath of Service	Love Bites	9.5	2014
Master of Magic		10	2017

Merlin's Legacy Series
Title	Anthology (If Applicable)	Series Order	Year Published
Master of Seduction		1	2017
Master of Valor		2	2018
Master of Fate		3	2019
Master of Passion		4	2019
Master of Honor		5	2020
Master of Desire		6	2020

Talents Series
Title	Anthology (If Applicable)	Series Order	Year Published
Arcane Kiss		1	2017
Arcane Heart		2	2018
Arcane Island		3	2022
Raven's Song		4	2022
Arcane Deception		5	2023
Arcane Betrayal: An Arcane Talents Christmas Romance		6	2023

Forever Kisses Series
Anthology Title	Short Story/Novella Titles	Series Order	Year Published
Forever Kisses	Forever Kiss and Beth's Kiss	1	2021
Forever Kisses Vol.2	Hope's Kiss, Kissing the Hunter, A Candidate for the Kiss, and Blood and Kisses	2	2021

Graven Gods Series
Title	Anthology (If Applicable)	Series Order	Year Published
Paladin		1	2016

Time Hunters Series
Title	Anthology (If Applicable)	Series Order	Year Published
Jane's Warlord		1	2007
Warfem	Warlord	1.25	2007
The Warlord and the Fem	Warlord	1.5	2007
Baby, You've Changed	Warlord	1.75	2007
Warrior		2	2008
Guardian		3	2009
Enforcer	Unbound	3.5	2013

Mothership Rangers Series
Title	Anthology (If Applicable)	Series Order	Year Published
Wildcard		1	2024
Invisible Monsters		2	2025

Misc. Novels, Novellas, and Short Stories
Title	Anthology (If Applicable)	Year Published
Roarke's Prisoner	Secrets 2	1996
Blood and Kisses	Secrets 3	1997
Candidate for the Kiss	Secrets 6	2000
Kissing the Hunter	Secrets 7	2004
Wake Me	Secrets 11	2004
Taming Jack	Tales from the Temple 2	2004
Mercenaries		2005
Hero Sandwich	Hard Candy	2005
Stranded	In Other Worlds	2005
Vampire Christmas	A Changeling for All Seasons	2005
Blood Service	All Wrapped Up	2006
Captive Dreams		2006
Dragon Dance	Beyond the Dark	2007
Blood and Roses	Burning Up	2007
Passionate Ink		2007
The Dark One	Dark Side	2007
Mad Dog Love	Shifter	2008
The Dhampir		2010
Without Restraint		2015
Dracula Dominant		2015
Wake Me		2016
Vampire Christmas		2016
Christmas Magic-Frosty the Snow Dom		2016
Mistletoe and Masks (Yule Tied)		2016
Infernal Desire		2017
Christmas Carole		2018
Fox and Feral		2019
Passionate Prisoners		2021
All Wrapped Up		2023
UnMasked		2024
How to Write Fight Scenes		2025

== Awards ==
Angela Knight's books and series are the winners of multiple awards and achievements.

Before her fiction work Angela Knight won numerous awards for journalism with the South Carolina Press Association.

Her novel awards are as follows:

Romantic Times Awards

- Book of the Year Award, Forever Kiss, (2004)
- Career Achievement award in Paranormal Romance (2007)
- Reviewer's Choice Best Erotic Romance (2007)
- Reviewer's Choice Best Werewolf Romance (2007)

USA Today

- Three week bestseller for USA Today (Master of the Moon)
- No. 35 & No. 76 booklist for USA Today (Master of Wolves)

Publishers Weekly

- Debuted at No. 10 (Master of Wolves)

The New York Times

- Bestseller Extended List (Master of Wolves)

== Writing instruction ==
Currently, even though Angela Knight is still writing and publishing, her main work seems to be focused on writing instruction. Angela Knight has written two author based self help books: Passionate Ink: Angela Knight's Guide to Writing Romance (Women's Fiction Writing Guides Book 1) focuses on writing one's romance novel from the outline to the final draft. Her second book, Fictional Combat (Women's Fiction Writing Guides 2) focuses on writing action scenes and how to add conflict into one's story. Angela Knight has also been to numerous book conferences alongside other erotica authors including Sizzle in the South hosted in July 2019 at the Buchanan County Public Library. There she announced her novel Without Restraint alongside fellow authors Sylvia Day and Lora Leigh. Angela Knight also runs a few online classes, including but not limited to courses about pitches, query letters, and writing and editing a romance novel. All of the classes are hosted through SavvyAuthors.
