= Thief of Hearts (disambiguation) =

Thief of Hearts is a 1984 American drama film.

Thief of Hearts can also refer to:

== Music ==
- "Thief of Hearts", a song by Bon Jovi on the 2004 album 100,000,000 Bon Jovi Fans Can't Be Wrong
- "Thief of Hearts", a song by Madonna on the 1992 album Erotica
- "Thief of Hearts", a 1984 song by Melissa Manchester from the film of the same name
- "Thief of Hearts", a song by Tina Turner on the 1996 album Wildest Dreams

== Television ==
- Ladrón de corazones ("Thief of Hearts"), a 2003 American Spanish-language telenovela
- "Thief! (Of Hearts)", a 1987 episode of the American animated TV series The New Archies
- "Thief of Hearts", a 1994 episode of the American TV series Viper
- "Thief of Hearts", a 2005 episode of the American TV series The Inside
- "Thief of Hearts", a 2020 episode of the American TV series L.A.'s Finest

== Other ==
- Thief of Hearts, a 1995 novel by Laurence Yep
- Thief of Hearts, a 2001 novel by MaryJanice Davidson
- Thief of Hearts, a horse that won the Prix de Condé in 1997
