= Undead and Unwed =

2004 novel by MaryJanice Davidson

- Author: MaryJanice Davidson
- Language: English
- Series: The Undead Series
- Genre: mystery, horror, romance
- Publisher: Berkley
- Publication date: 2004 (Berkley edition)
- Publication place: United States
- Media type: Print
- Pages: 288 pp (Berkley edition)
- ISBN: 0-425-19485-X (Berkley edition)
- OCLC: 54471927
- LC Class: CPB Box no. 2149 vol. 16
- Followed by: Undead and Unemployed

Undead and Unwed is a paranormal romance novel by MaryJanice Davidson. It is the first adventure of Elizabeth Anne "Betsy" Taylor in the Undead series after her transformation into a vampire. The book was released on March 2, 2004 through Berkley Books and was on the Maclean's bestseller list for April 4, 2004.

== Plot summary ==
Betsy Taylor—former model, newly unemployed secretary, 30, and still single—wakes up after being flattened by a Pontiac Aztek in a tacky coffin wearing cheap knock-off shoes. Her mother is glad she is back, albeit as a vampire, but her stepmother is enraged that Betsy has reclaimed her designer-shoe collection. With a wealthy best friend and a newly acquired doctor pal who is not susceptible to her formidable allure, she sets out to right wrongs but is abducted by Nostro, a tacky 500-year-old vampire who rules the undead roost. It seems that Betsy is an anomaly: a vampire who doesn't burn in sunlight, can fight the urge to feed, and is not repulsed by religious articles, all of which may make her the prophesied Queen of the Vampires. Teaming up with gorgeous vampire Eric Sinclair, who is in her opinion a major pervert, she takes on Nostro and his minions.

== Characters ==
=== Major characters ===
Undead and Unwed features the following characters.

- Elizabeth Anne "Betsy" Taylor: Betsy is a normal unemployed woman until she is hit by a car and wakes up a vampire.
- Eric Sinclair: Eric is infatuated by Betsy and has plans for the newly risen vampire. He is also quite fond of Betsy himself.
- Jessica: Best friend to Betsy, Jessica is rich and devastated by her friend's untimely death. She is quick to accept Betsy being a vampire.
- Marc: a doctor Betsy meets on top of a building when she saves him from attempting to kill himself. Although he finds her attractive, he informs her that she is not his type as he is gay.
- Tina: is Eric's maker, best friend, and second in command. She is protective of Eric and quick to help Betsy. She gave up on men a long time ago.
- Nostro: is a short-tempered 500 year old vampire who currently controls the vampires.

=== Other characters ===
- Nick Berry: Nick was Betsy's dream guy until she died and was reawakened as a vampire. After a very bad sexual encounter, Betsy decides things are over with Nick.
- The Fiends: a group of feral vampires who were starved of blood when they were turned into vampires. These vampires were created by Nostro and reverted to animals.
- Dennis: Sinclair's male vampire companion and butler. Gay.
- Karen: Sinclair's human ladyfriend and meal, whom Betsy has a deep connection with.

== Reception ==
Critical reception has been mostly positive. Kliatt gave the audiobook for Undead and Unwed a favorable review, writing that "Wu adds a bevy of emotions to Betsy's otherwise repetitive one-shoe note, making her both likable and amusing."
