= Emma Holly =

American novelist

- Born: 1961; New Jersey, United States
- Died: June 11, 2022 (aged 60–61)
- Occupation: Novelist
- Writing career
- Period: 1998–2022
- Genres: Erotica, Romance, Paranormal
- Website: www.mninter.net/~emmah

Emma Holly (1961–2022) was an American author who specialized in writing erotic romance novels, often with a focus on BDSM. She wrote over seventy books and was a finalist for the Romance Writers of America 2004 RITA award for Best Paranormal Romance.

== Biography ==
Emma Holly was born in New Jersey and raised in Baltimore, where she lived with her older sister Laurie.

Leading back to her pre-adolescent fantasy, to be the fiancée of Batman, Holly always wanted to be a writer. After 10 years of writing, she sold her first book in 1998.

Holly specialized in writing erotica-romance and often with a focus on BDSM. Another common element of Holly's erotic style was a bisexual male protagonist. She has written over twenty books and was a finalist for the Romance Writers of America 2004 RITA award for Best Paranormal Romance.

== Bibliography ==
=== Single erotica-romance novels ===
- Ménage, 1998
- Cooking Up a Storm, 1998
- Velvet Glove, 1999
- In the Flesh, 2000
- Strange Attractions, 2004
- Personal Assets, 2004
- All U Can Eat, 2006
- Fairyville, 2007, 2008 (with epilogue, previously published as Amazon short, And Then There Were Four).

=== Beyond Desire series ===
1. Beyond Innocence, 2001 also in Beyond Desire
2. Beyond Seduction, 2002 also in Beyond Desire

=== Midnight Desire series ===
#	Title	Also In	Publication Date
0.5	Luisa's Desire	Fantasy Midnight Desire	2002 2006
1	Catching Midnight	Midnight Desire	2003
2	Hunting Midnight		2003
2.5	The Night Owl	Hot Blooded	2004
3	Courting Midnight		2005
4	Kissing Midnight		2009
5	Breaking Midnight		2009
6	Saving Midnight		2009
7	Devil at Midnight		2010
8	Angel at Dawn		2011

=== Demons series ===
1. The Demon's Daughter, 2004
2. The Demon's Angel in Demon's Delight
3. The Countess' Pleasure in Hot Spell
4. Prince of ice, 2006
5. Demon's Fire, 2008

=== Anthologies and collections ===
Anthology or Collection	Contents	Publication Date	Comments
Secrets Volume 4	The Love Slave	1998	with Helena Ravenscroft and Susie Raymond
Black Lace Omnibus IV	The Top of her Game	1999	with MaryJanice Davidson, Catherine Spangler and Vickie Taylor
Fantasy	Luisa's Desire	2002	with Christine Feehan, Sabrina Jeffries and Elda Minger
Hot Spell	The Countess' Pleasure	2005	with Meljean Brook, Lora Leigh and Shiloh Walker
Hot Blooded	The Night Owl	2004	with Christine Feehan, Angela Knight and Maggie Shayne
Beyond Desire	Beyond Innocence Beyond Seduction	2005	
Midnight Desire	Luisa's Desire Catching Midnight	2006	
Demon's Delight	The Demon's Angel	2007	with MaryJanice Davidson, Catherine Spangler and Vickie Taylor
Beyond the Dark	Queen of All She Surveys	2007	with Angela Knight, Lora Leigh and Diane Whiteside
