= Undead and Unappreciated =

Book by MaryJanice Davidson

- Author: MaryJanice Davidson
- Language: English
- Series: The Undead Series
- Genre: mystery, horror, romance
- Publisher: Berkley
- Publication date: 2005 (Berkley edition)
- Publication place: United States
- Media type: Print
- Pages: 288 pp (Berkley edition)
- ISBN: 0-425-20433-2 (Berkley edition)
- OCLC: 57722421
- Dewey Decimal: 813/.6 22
- LC Class: PS3604.A949 U525 2005
- Preceded by: Undead and Unemployed
- Followed by: Undead and Unreturnable

Undead and Unappreciated is the third novel in the Undead series by MaryJanice Davidson. The breezily written paranormal romance novel is told from the point of view of Betsy Taylor, reluctant Vampire Queen and not-so-reluctant shoe-hound, and introduces a major character to the series: Laura, Betsy's half-sister and the daughter of the Devil herself.

The book marks the series' first time being printed in hardback and was listed on the Wall Street Journal's hardcover bestseller list for July 14, 2005.

== Plot summary ==
The novel has two prologues. The first prologue relates how the devil, out of boredom, possessed a "not very nice" woman and gave birth to a daughter; however, the devil soon returned to Hell, since she preferred it to living with a newborn. The devil's daughter, Laura, was given up for adoption by her biological mother, Antonia, for whom the possession was like a fugue state. Ironically, Laura is adopted by a Presbyterian minister and his wife, the Goodmans. The second prologue introduces the recently turned vampire Betsy Taylor, the heroine of the Undead series of paranormal romance novels, as she crashes a meeting of Alcoholics Anonymous, where she hopes to learn techniques to control her thirst for blood. The two prologues are related because Laura is Betsy's half-sister, sharing the same father; the not-very-nice Antonia is Betsy's stepmother.

This third novel of the series has thirty-five chapters and, as usual, is told from the point of view of Betsy (first-person narrative). The early chapters introduce Betsy, who has become the Queen of the Vampires through odd circumstances, and her circle of friends/roommates. Her best friend is the very cool and very wealthy Jessica, whom she's known since the seventh grade; Jessica is patient with Betsy and supportive. Another close friend and confidante is Marc Spangler, an emergency-ward physician. Other major human characters include Betsy's father and stepmother Antonia ("the Ant"), who are expecting a baby, Betsy's professor mom Elise (a Civil War historian) and a policeman, Nick Berry. On the vampire side, Betsy is betrothed to the earnest Eric Sinclair, now King of the Vampires; although Eric is smitten with her, Betsy is not enthusiastic.

The novel is framed by a minor story, a wedding between a vampire and a human, Andrea Mercer and Daniel Harris, who are friends with Betsy. Such marriages are almost unheard-of because vampires had traditionally viewed human beings as "sheep", that is, as food rather than romantic partners. In an early chapter, Betsy is asked to preside at the wedding; she does so in the final chapter, quoting from Romeo and Juliet: "what love can do, that dares love attempt". Throughout the novel, Betsy reminds herself that she needs to prepare for the wedding; Betsy's distractions are also highlighted by noting when she forgets about the upcoming wedding.

The plot begins in earnest when Betsy receives a non-invitation to her stepmother's baby shower; the shower is scheduled for daylight hours, making it impossible for vampires to attend. To reinforce the snub, Betsy's weak-willed father visits Betsy at home to ask her to stay away, where he lets slip that the new baby is Antonia's second child. Betsy and her friends confirm this revelation from Antonia herself, who describes unwillingly how she woke up with no memories of the preceding ten months, and dropped the baby girl, Laura, off at the hospital.

Much of the novel revolves around the search for Laura and getting to know her. Laura turns out to be a beautiful but bashful girl just beginning college, and eager to do the right thing for everyone. She's very sweet-natured and wholesome, always seeking peaceful solutions, and making friends with everyone, even people with difficult tempers. Getting to know Laura, Betsy likes her (although she envies her beauty) and can't bring herself to tell her about her sordid vampiric life or that Laura herself is the "spawn of Satan" and destined to conquer the world.

Before finding Laura, Betsy is frustrated by not knowing enough and resolves to read the Book of the Dead, a holy relic for vampires analogous to the Bible. The Book was written by an insane vampire who could see the future; unfortunately, it also drives anyone reading it insane. Throwing caution to the wind, Betsy reads the Book for several hours. The Book describes Betsy's ascension to Queen of the Vampires and her marriage to Eric, and also predicts that her half-sister Laura is fated to take over the world. Unfortunately, the book drives Betsy insane or, rather, changes her into a traditionally thinking vampire, as shown by the novel's first-person perspective. In that state, she attacks her human friends Jessica and Marc, indulges unbridled passions with her consort Eric, and tries to kill his vampire assistant Tina, who defeats her handily. She wakes up with a bruised head, a recovered sanity and much remorse – and also a new power, to awaken before sunset, which she uses to take Laura to Antonia's baby shower, so that Laura can meet her birth mother. Throughout the remainder of the novel, she tries to recover her friends' trust, particularly Jessica's, and also make amends with Eric.

The novel's climax occurs in a nightclub, Scratch. Betsy inherited the club, but the vampire staff are unhappy with her non-traditional changes, including not allowing them to drink blood from humans or kill them. The staff form a union and strike to demand better "working conditions". As their bargaining chip, the staff kidnap Betsy's half-sister Laura, mistaking her for an ordinary human girl. Unfortunately for them, they handle her too roughly and, despite her dislike of violence, Laura begins killing them with weapons formed from hellfire. Eric joins them and the three together win the fight with the vampires. Laura reveals that she'd known all along about Betsy and about herself, but she was waiting for Betsy to trust her enough. Laura is convinced that she can overcome her demonic heritage and be a good person, although she also displays a touch of temper. Later, Betsy meets the Devil herself—resembling a wonderfully dressed Lena Olin—who reveals that Laura will indeed take over the world.

The novel is also marked by several minor stories that contribute to characterizing Betsy and her friends. It opens with a semi-serious discussion between Marc and Betsy about his recovery from alcoholism. Also near the beginning, Eric and his long-time assistant Tina return from a trip to Europe; Eric gives Betsy a little shoe necklace, playing on Betsy's well-known weakness for shoes and characterizing how much he cares for her. Betsy's compassion is highlighted by her treatment of "George", one of the Fiends she inherited from another vampire vanquished in an earlier novel. Fiends are vampires that have been driven insane, unable to speak or reason, by denying them blood. Most of the Fiends are being tended to by Betsy's vampire friend Alice, but George continually escapes and makes his way to Betsy's house. Betsy begins to feed him her own blood, and George begins to recover his sanity by learning to crochet.

== Reception ==
Undead and Unappreciated was reviewed by Booklist, Publishers Weekly, and the Science Fiction Chronicle.

== Relative chronology ==
The events in the novella "Dead Girls Don't Dance" published in the anthology Cravings (2004) occur before those of this novel.
