= Demon's Delight =

Anthology novel (2007)

- Author: MaryJanice Davidson; Emma Holly; Vickie Taylor; Catherine Spangler
- Cover artist: Cliff Nielsen
- Language: English
- Genre: supernatural, romance, paranormal romance
- Publisher: Berkley Publishing Group
- Publication date: 2007
- Publication place: United States
- Media type: Print (Paperback)
- Pages: 313 pp (first edition, paperback)
- ISBN: 978-0-425-21381-0 (first edition, paperback)
- OCLC: 77767472
- Dewey Decimal: 813/.6 22
- LC Class: PS3604.A949 D46 2007

Demon's Delight is an anthology novel containing four short stories written by authors MaryJanice Davidson, Emma Holly, Vickie Taylor, and Catherine Spangler.

== Novellas ==
=== Witch Way ===
Chris Mere is the descendant of a long line of witches that were cursed in the times of the Salem Witch Trials. The curse causes each generation to pick one descendant and it is his job to kill the witch hunter who comes to destroy the de Mere family. Rhea Goodman is the witch hunter that is destined to kill the next descendant of the de Mere line. Rather than killing Rhea, Chris approaches her days after she discovers her destiny to try to stop the cycle of violence before they become the next dead descendants of their family lines. Witch Way is written by MaryJanice Davidson.

=== Street Corners and Halos ===
Written by Catherine Spangler.

=== The Demon's Angel ===
Written by Emma Holly.

=== Angel and the Hellraiser ===
Written by Vickie Taylor
