= Wyndham Werewolves =

Book series by MaryJanice Davidson

The Wyndham Werewolves series is a paranormal romance book series by MaryJanice Davidson. The series is about the Wyndham werewolf pack and focuses on various characters throughout the series.

== Publications ==
=== Short stories ===
- "Love's Prisoner" (2000, first published in Secrets 6, Red Sage Publishing)
- "Jared's Wolf" (2002, first published in Secrets 8, Red Sage Publishing)
- "Santa Claws" (2003, Naughty or Nice, Ellora's Cave, republished in 2006 in Dead and Loving It, Berkley)
- "Speed Dating Werewolf Style Or, Ow, I Think You Broke The Bone" (2008, first published in Dead Over Heels, Berkley)

=== Novels ===
==== Derik's Bane ====
Starting out in the Wyndham Mansion, Werewolf Derik is ordered by his alpha, Michael Windham, to go to California and find the reincarnation of a powerful sorceress - Morgan LeFay, half sister of King Arthur - and stop her from what ever she is doing by "taking care" of her. If he fails to do so, the world will end in six days. This prediction from psychic werewolf Antonia serves as a diversion for Derik, who has recently become an alpha wolf, and would otherwise have gotten into a fight with Michael over alpha status in the Pack, a fight only one of them could have possibly survived.

Upon his arrival in Monterey, California, Derik discovers that the reincarnation of Morgan LeFay is a gorgeous but benign medical doctor named Sara Gunn, who has had a string of the most unlikely luck since the day she was born, but has no intention whatsoever to destroy the world. Derik, posing as car mechanic, tries to kill her but fails miserably several times, as do others, namely an odd group calling themselves Arthur's Chosen, whose goal is the resurrection of King Arthur. After realizing he can't possibly kill Sara, and convincing her that her string of luck is not pure coincidence, they team up and visit Doctor Cummings, Sara's mentor, who, as it turns out has known of Sara's predicament since before she was born and who points them towards the lair of the Arthur's Chosen in Salem, Massachusetts.

During the trip across the country, Michael tries and succeeds to cajole Sara - who is initially rather not very fond of Derik because he has tried to kill her, but adores his gorgeous body - into sleeping with him by means of several lies and half-truth. Over the next days during the trip, Sara falls under Derik's spell, and when he finally tells her that he has cheated her into sleeping with him, she rejects him at first, but shortly after, they confess their love to each other.

Upon arrival in Boston, Mass., they both put off seeking out the Arthur's Chosen, not wanting to end the trip and the romance that has developed between them. Sara however is captured by the Arthur's Chosen shortly after, brought to a warehouse and forced to give them some of her blood, which they need to resurrect King Arthur through black magic. Derek barges into the warehouse, after having been warned by Antonia that he will die if he enters the warehouse. The Arthur's Chosen release Sara after draining some of her blood and start working on the resurrection, which they can't finish however, because Derik and Sara interfere. The interrupted spell sets free a demon who immediately starts to kill everyone, and would - as Sara sees in a vision - have extinguished all life on earth. After the demon has killed all of the Arthur's Chosen, he severely wounds Derik, breaking his neck, but is attacked by Sara, who, in another nearly-impossible lucky event kills it by simply kicking it with her foot, thus saving the world.

Sara then tends to Derik, who is clinically dead, and tries to reanimate him with CPR. Within minutes, Derik is alive again, and almost completely healed due to his werewolf healing abilities and Sara's magic.

Having successfully saved the world, the couple returns to the Wyndham Mansion and is greeted by all Werewolves. After Dinner with Michael and his wife Jeannie, Derik proposes to Sara by simply answering Michael's question of what will happen next with "We will marry, and you will give us an RV so we can travel the country". Sara, initially reluctant because Derik did not ask her in private first, eventually accepts the proposal. This ends Derik's struggle to prove his alpha status, because he is now married to the most powerful sorceress in the world, more or less cementing his status for everyone to see. It is then also revealed by Antonia that by "taking care" of Sara, she didn't mean "kill", but literally "keep safe", and that Derik was fated to Save the world not by killing Sara but by loving her, and that she couldn't tell him before or he would have screwed it up.

The book was reviewed by Booklist.

== See also ==
- The Undead Series
