= Gena Showalter =

American writer

- Born: 1975 (age 50–51); Oklahoma
- Occupation: Novelist
- Writing career
- Period: 1975–present
- Genres: Romance, young adult fiction, paranormal, contemporary
- Website: www.genashowalter.com

Gena Showalter (born 1975 in Oklahoma) is an American author in the genres of contemporary romance, paranormal romance, and young adult.

Showalter sold her first book at the age of 27, and has published over 70 books. She has been named by The New York Times and USA Today as a bestselling author. Showalter has successfully published in the adult and young adult market.

== Awards ==
Alice in Zombieland was the winner of the 2014 South Carolina Children's, Junior and Young Adult Book Award.

== Bibliography ==
=== Adult Paranormal Romance ===
==== Stand Alone Novels ====
Title	Publication Date	Notes
Oh My Goth	Jul 2006	
Animal Instincts	Apr 2007	ISBN 0-373-77199-1
Catch A Mate,	Jun 2007	ISBN 0-373-77235-1
Temptation in Shadows	Jun 2014	
Ever Night	May 2015	

==== Imperia ====
1. The Stone Prince, September 2003 ISBN 0-373-77007-3
2. Prince of Forever, February 2005 ISBN 0-373-77032-4 (formerly The Pleasure Slave)

==== Alien Huntress ====
#	Title	Also In	Publication Date	ISBN	Notes
1	Awaken Me Darkly		May 2005	ISBN 0-7434-9749-X	Mia Snow & Kyrin en Arr
2	Enslave Me Sweetly		Jun 2006	ISBN 0-7434-9750-3	Eden Black & Lucius Adaire
3	Savor Me Slowly		Dec 2007	ISBN 1-4165-3163-7	Mishka Le'Ace & Jaxon Tremain
4	Tempt Me Eternally	Deep Kiss of Winter	Feb 2009	ISBN 1-4391-5966-1	Aleaha Love & Breean
5	Seduce the Darkness		Jun 2009	ISBN 1-4165-3164-5	Bride McKells & Devyn
6	Ecstasy in Darkness		Oct 2010	ISBN 1-4391-7577-2	Ava Sans & McKell
7	Dark Taste of Rapture		Aug 2011	ISBN 1-4391-7578-0	Noelle Tremain & Hector Dean

==== Atlantis ====
#	Title	Also In	Publication Date	ISBN	Notes
1	Heart of the Dragon		Sep 2005	ISBN 0-373-77057-X	
2	Jewel of Atlantis		Feb 2006	ISBN 0-373-77096-0	
3	The Nymph King		Feb 2007	ISBN 0-373-77096-0	
4	The Vampire's Bride		Mar 2009	ISBN 0-373-77359-5	
5	The Amazon's Curse	Into the Dark	Mar 2009	ISBN 0-373-77451-6	

==== Lords of the Underworld ====
#	Title	Also In	Lord	Lord's Title	Publication Date	ISBN	Comments
0.5	The Darkest Fire	Into the Dark	Geyron	Keeper Of Hell	Apr 2008	ISBN 0-373-77451-6	ebook
1	The Darkest Night		Maddox	Keeper Of Violence	May 2008		
2	The Darkest Kiss		Lucien	Keeper Of Death	Jun 2008		
3	The Darkest Pleasure		Reyes	Keeper Of Pain	Jul 2008		
3.5	The Darkest Prison	Into the Dark	Atlas	Titan God of Strength	Jul 2009		novella ebook
4	The Darkest Whisper		Sabin	Keeper Of Doubt	Sep 2009		
4.5	The Darkest Angel	Heart of the Darkness Dark Beginnings	Lysander	Warrior Angel of the Elite Seven	Jan 2010		novella
4.7	The Darkest Facts: A Lords of the Underworld Companion	Into the Dark			May 2010		
5	The Darkest Passion		Aeron	Keeper Of Wrath	Jun 2010		
6	The Darkest Lie		Gideon	Keeper Of Lies	Jul 2010		
7	The Darkest Secret		Amun	Keeper Of Secrets	Apr 2011		
8	The Darkest Surrender		Strider	Keeper Of Defeat	Sep 2011		
9	The Darkest Seduction		Paris	Keeper Of Promiscuity	Feb 2012		
10	The Darkest Craving		Kane	Keeper Of Disaster	Jul 2013		
11	The Darkest Touch		Torin	Keeper Of Disease	Nov 2014		
12	The Darkest Torment		Baden	Keeper Of Distrust	May 2016		
13	The Darkest Promise		Cameo	Keeper Of Misery	Jun 2017		
14	The Darkest Warrior		Puck	Keeper Of Indifference	June 2018		
14.5	The Darkest Captive	1001 Dark Nights 2018	Galen	Keeper of Jealousy and False Hope	Dec 2018		novella
14.7	The Darkest Assassin	1001 Dark Nights 2019	Fox	Keeper of Distrust	Dec 2019		
15	The Darkest King		William	Of the Dark	Feb 2020		novella
15.5	The Darkest Destiny	1001 Dark Nights 2021	Viola	Keeper of Narcissism	Dec 2021		novella

===== Tales of an Extraordinary Girl =====
1. Playing With Fire, September 2006 ISBN 0-373-77129-0
2. Twice as Hot, February 2010 ISBN 0-373-77437-0

==== Royal House of Shadows ====
A series of 4 books each by a different author

1. Lord of the Vampires by Gena Showalter (August 2011) ISBN 978-0-373-61866-8
2. Lord of Rage by Jill Monroe (September 2011) ISBN 978-0-373-61868-2
3. Lord of the Wolfyn by Jessica Andersen (October 2011) ISBN 978-0-373-61870-5
4. Lord of the Abyss by Nalini Singh (December 2011) ISBN 978-0-373-61872-9

==== Angels of the Dark ====
The Angels of the Dark series takes place in the same universe as Lords of the Underworld series and concerns the armies of Heaven.

1. Wicked Nights, June 2012 ISBN 0-373-77698-5 (Zacharel)
2. Beauty Awakened, February 2013 ISBN 0-373-77743-4 (Koldo)
3. Burning Dawn, May 2014 (Thane)

==== Otherworld Assassins ====
The Otherworld Assassins series takes place in the same universe as the Alien Huntress series. It deals with a different Black Ops group.

1. Last Kiss Goodnight, December 2012, Cover art by Nathália Suellen ISBN 1-4516-7159-8 (Solomon Judah & Vika Lukas)
2. Black and Blue, October 2013 ISBN 978-1-4516-7160-5 (Corbin Blue & Evangeline Black)
3. Dark Swan in Blood Red Kiss anthology, September 2016 ISBN 978-1-5011-4258-1 (Dallas Gutierrez & Lilica Swan)

==== Gods of War ====
1. Shadow and Ice (October 2018)-Knox of Iviland
2. Frost and Flame (September 24, 2019)-Bane of Adwaeweth

==== Rise of the Warlords ====
#	Title	Publication Date	Notes
1	The Warlord	Apr 2021	
2	The Immortal	Feb 2022	

==== Immortal Enemies ====
#	Title	Publication Date	Notes
1	Heartless	Jun 2021	
2	Ruthless	Aug 2022	

==== Non-fiction ====
- Dating The Undead - Loving The Immortal Man December 27, 2011 ISBN 0-373-89252-7

=== Adult Contemporary Romance ===
==== Original Heartbreakers ====
1. The One You Want in The All For You Anthology, December 2014
2. The Closer You Come, March 2015
3. The Hotter You Burn, July 2015
4. The Harder You Fall, November 2015
5. Can't Hardly Breathe, August 2017
6. Can't Let Go, October 2017
7. Can't Get Enough, December 2017 (Self-published)

==== A Jane Ladling Mystery ====
with Jill Monroe

#	Title	Publication Date	Notes
1	Romancing the Gravestone	Sep 2021	
2	No Gravestone Left Unturned	Mar 2022	
3	Game of Gravestones	Sep 2022	

=== Young Adult ===
==== Stand Alone Novels ====
- Oh My Goth, July 2006 ISBN 1-4165-2474-6, Revised edition, September 4, 2018 ISBN 978-1-3351-3972-6

==== Teen Alien Huntress ====
1. Red Handed, June 2007 ISBN 1-4165-3224-2
2. Blacklisted, July 2007 ISBN 1-4165-3225-0

==== Intertwined ====
1. Intertwined, September 2009 ISBN 0-373-21012-4
2. Unraveled, August 2010 ISBN 0-373-21022-1
3. Twisted, August 2011 ISBN 0-373-21038-8

==== White Rabbit Chronicles ====
1. Alice in Zombieland, September 2012 ISBN 0-373-21058-2
2. Through the Zombie Glass, October 2013
3. The Queen of Zombie Hearts, September 2014
4. A Mad Zombie Party, September 2015
5. Kat in Zombieland, February 2017 (short story taking place during A Mad Zombie Party)
- Down the Rabbit Hole, February 2019 (collection of two bonus scenes from the series)

==== Everlife ====
1. Firstlife, February 2016
2. Lifeblood, February 2017
3. Everlife, February 2018

==== The Forest of Good and Evil ====
1. The Evil Queen (June 25, 2019)
2. The Glass Queen(September 29, 2020)

=== Anthologies ===
Anthology or Collection	Contents	Publication Date	ISBN	Comments
Mysteria	The Witches of Mysteria and the Dead Who Love Them	Jul 2006	ISBN 0-425-21106-1	with MaryJanice Davidson, Susan Grant and P.C. Cast
Mysteria Lane	A Tawdry Affair	Dec 2008	ISBN 0-425-22294-2	with MaryJanice Davidson, Susan Grant and P.C. Cast
Deep Kiss of Winter	Tempt me Eternally	Oct 2009	ISBN 1-4391-5966-1	
Heart of Darkness	The Darkest Angel	Jan 2010	ISBN 0-373-77431-1	
Darkest Beginnings	The Darkest Fire The Darkest Prison The Darkest Angel	Apr 2010	ISBN 0-7783-0371-3	
Into the Dark	The Darkest Fire The Amazon's Curse The Darkest Prison	Apr 2010	ISBN 0-373-77451-6	
The Bodyguard	Temptation in Shadows	Jun 2010	ISBN 0-312-94323-7	
On the Hunt	Ever Night	Feb 2011	ISBN 0-451-23243-7	with Jessica Andersen
After Dark	The Darkest Angel	May 2011	ISBN 0-373-77825-2	with debut author Kait Ballenger's novel Shadow Hunter
After Moonrise	Haunted	Nov 2012	ISBN 0-373-77822-8	with P.C. Cast
The Gena Showalter Bundle	The Stone Prince The Pleasure Slave Heart of the Dragon	Feb 2007	ISBN 9781552549032	
Gena Showalter's Atlantis Series Bundle	Heart of the Dragon Jewel of Atlantis The Nymph King The Vampire's Bride The Amazon's Curse	Aug 2009	ISBN 9781426841859	
Lord of the Vampires 4 in 1	Lord of the Vampires The Darkest Angel The Amazon's Curse The Darkest Prison	Aug 2011	ISBN 9781459212466	
Magic at Midnight	The Witches of Mysteria and the Dead Who Love Them A Tawdry Affair	Feb 2013	ISBN 9780425265383	
All For You	The One You Want	Dec 2014	ISBN 9781460380475	
