= Jessica Andersen =

American writer

Jessica S. Andersen
- Born: 1973 (age 52–53); Massachusetts, U.S.
- Education: Tufts University (PhD)
- Occupation: Novelist
- Writing career
- Language: English
- Period: 2001–present
- Genre: Romance
- Website: www.jessicaandersen.com

Jessica S. Andersen (born 1973) is an American writer. Since 2001, she has published over forty books in romance, mystery and science genres. Andersen holds a PhD in Genetics from Tufts University.

== Early life and education ==
Born in 1973, Andersen was born and raised in eastern Massachusetts, United States. Andersen received an undergraduate degree in biology from Tufts University, and then completed a PhD in genetics.

== Career ==
Before beginning to write full time, Andersen worked as a patent agent at the U.S. Patent an Trademark Office, a freelance editor, landscaper and a professional horse trainer and riding coach.

Andersen published her first novel, The Stable Affair, in 2002. She went on to write prolifically for Harlequin Intrigue, producing multiple series including the Bodyguards Unlimited, Denver, CO series, the Bear Claw Creek Crime Lab series, and several standalone romantic suspense titles.

In 2011, she contributed Lord of the Wolfyn to the Royal House of Shadows multi-author series alongside Gena Showalter, Jill Monroe, and Nalini Singh.

Beginning in 2013, Andersen adopted the pen name Jesse Hayworth for her Mustang Ridge series, a contemporary western romance series set on a family-run dude ranch in Wyoming. The Mustang Ridge series comprises five novels and a novella, published between 2013 and 2015 by Signet/Penguin.

== Bibliography ==
=== Single novels ===
- The Stable Affair (Ltdbooks 2002 ISBN 9781553165262)
- The Guardian of the Amulets, 2003
- Bullseye, September 2005 also in Silent Awakening
- Red Alert, January 2006
- Under the Microscope, January 2007
- Prescription: Makeover, April 2007
- Classified Baby, August 2007
- Meet Me at Midnight, September 2007
- Twin Targets, 2008 also in Lord of the Wolfyn
- Snowed in With the Boss, March 2009
  - Book 3 of Kenner County Crime Unit
- Internal Affairs, October 2009
- With the MD … at the Altar?, June 2008 also in The Heart of Brody Mcquade
- Under the Microscope, January 2007
- Protector of One also in Internal Affairs
- Doctor's Orders

=== Dolphin Friendly series ===
1. Dolphin Friendly, February 2003
2. Seal with a Kiss, December 2003

=== Bear Claw Creek Crime Lab series ===
1. Ricochet, April 2006
2. At Close Range April 2006
3. Rapid Fire, July 2006
4. Manhunt in the Wild West, 2008
5. Mountain Investigation, 2009
6. Internal Affairs, 2009
7. Bear Claw Conspiracy, 2011 also in Man With the Muscle
8. Bear Claw Bodyguard, 2011 also in Black Ops Bodyguard
9. Bear Claw Lawman, 2012

=== Boston General series ===
1. Dr. Bodyguard, October 2003
2. Secret Witness, March 2004 also in Heart of a Hunter
3. Intensive Care, August 2004 also in Bulletproof Billionaire
4. Body Search, December 2004
5. Covert M.D., March 2005 also in Someone Safe
6. Sheriff's Daughter, June 2005 also in Bounty Hunter Honor

=== The Final Prophecy series ===
1. Night Keepers, June 2008
2. Dawn Keepers, January 2009
3. Sky Keepers, August 2009
4. Demon Keepers, April 2010
5. Blood Spells, November 2010
5.1. Crystal Skull in On the Hunt
6. Storm Kissed, June 2011
7. Magic Unchained, April 2012
8. Spellfire, 2012

=== Royal House of Shadows ===
A series of 4 books each by a different author

1. Lord of the Vampires by Gena Showalter (August 2011) ISBN 978-0-373-61866-8
2. Lord of Rage by Jill Monroe (September 2011) ISBN 978-0-373-61868-2
3. Lord of the Wolfyn by Jessica Andersen (October 2011) ISBN 978-0-373-61870-5
4. Lord of the Abyss by Nalini Singh (December 2011) ISBN 978-0-373-61872-9

=== Anthologies and collections ===
Anthology or Collection	Contents	Publication Date	In Collaboration With
Heart of a Hunter	Secret Witness	2004	Sylvie Kurtz
Bulletproof Billionaire	Intensive Care	2004	Mallory Kane
Someone Safe	Covert M.D	2005	Lori L. Harris
Bounty Hunter Honor	Sheriff's Daughter	2005	Kara Lennox
Silent Awakening	Bullseye	2005	Elaine Barbieri
On the Hunt	Crystal Skull	Feb 2011	Gena Showalter
A Taste of Romance	Dr. Protector	Sep 2006	Jane Porter, Stef Ann Holm and Kathryn Shay
The Heart of Brody Mcquade/ With the MD … at the Altar	With the MD … at the Altar	Sep 2008	Mallory Kate
Man With the Muscle/ Bear Claw Conspiracy	Bear Claw Conspiracy	Dec 2011	Julie Miller
Black Ops Bodyguard/ Bear Claw Bodyguard	Bear Claw Bodyguard	Jan 2012	Donna Young
