= Nathália Suellen =

Brazilian digital artist and illustrator (born 1989)

- Education: Self-taught
- Known for: Digital art / Mixed media / Book illustration
- Movement: Contemporary / Digital Art / Pop Surrealism / Lowbrow

Nathália Suellen (born 20 February 1989) is a surrealist digital artist and commercial illustrator from Rio de Janeiro, Brazil.

== Overview ==
Entirely self-taught, Suellen's signature style incorporates female in surroundings of a twisted and disturbing world characterized by the use of symbolism, retro-futurism and dystopia, born from a high-detailed mixture of photography, 3D and digital painting.

The themes of her work include self-discovery, sorrow, dreams/nightmares, fear of unknown, mortality, femininity and the juxtaposition of the pop surrealism and dark art imagery.

Her main characters are often captured in scenes where something sad is about to happen, as if they were trapped in a bad dream.

"Cinematic Styled Artist", as labeled by the BritishAdvanced Photoshop magazine in 2012, Suellen developed her unique style and technique by creating photo collage that result from a combination of commercial lighting and digital painting, tending to have a cinematic finish with each new work.

Nathália started her own business in 2008, specializing in dark art, cover design and photo manipulation.

Despite her personal illustrations, Nathália is mostly known by her commercial works and a notable clientele list which consists of musicians, photographers, best-selling writers as well as major companies including Random House, Penguin Group, HarperCollins, Simon & Schuster, McCann Erickson, Scholastic and Harry N. Abrams Books.

== Selected press ==
- Imagine Fx magazine,(Future Publishing) "Cover Stars":"If you wanna be my cover", 2012, issue 91, p17
- Imagine Fx magazine, issue 97 July, 2013.
- Idea photos magazine, May/June 2009, China
- IEVA 2013, Lithuania
- Photoshop Creative Brasil, Issue 17, 48
- Sketchoholic Book Art (Mad Artist Publishing): Vanity, 2012
- Julia Kuzmenko: Digital Photo Retouching: Beauty, Fashion & Portrait Photography Book Mad Artist Publishing
- Folha de S. Paulo, 2011
- Redivider 9.2, Art and Literature, 2012
- Dark Beauty Magazine Feature, Emptiness of Winter Solstice, 2011
- Faerie Magazine Cover, "Tales of the Silk Road" Issue 23, 2012

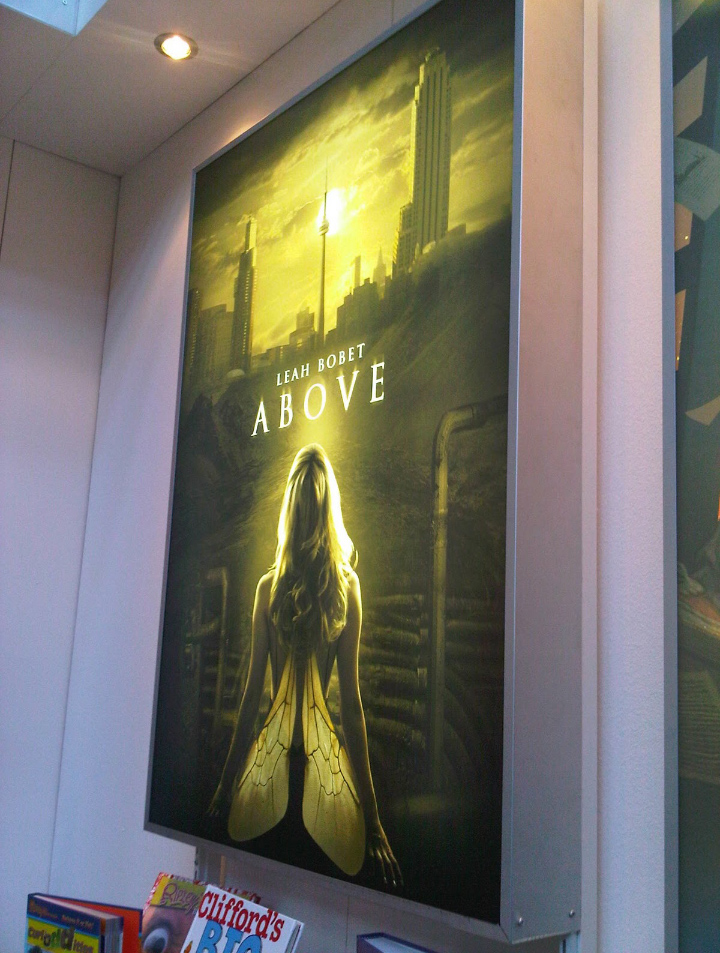
Suellen's Art "ABOVE" (Scholastic), Frankfurt Book Fair, 17 October 2011.

== Selected works ==
- Dark Moor – "Ars Musica", 2013
- Almah, "Unfold" 2013
- Noturna (band) – "A Dream Within a Dream", 2011
- The Grisha Trilogy: "The Gathering Dark" ["Shadow and Bone" (USA)], Leigh Bardugo – The New York Times bestselling author, (Orion Publishing Group) – ISBN 9780805094596
- Raven Quinn (American musician) – Art to "Not in Vain" Album – 2012
- "Last Kiss Goodnight", Gena Showalter – The New York Times and USA Today bestselling author,(Simon & Schuster) – ISBN 9781451671599
- "Black and Blue", Gena Showalter – The New York Times and USA Today bestselling author,(Simon & Schuster) – ISBN 9781451671605
- "Kill My Only Enemy", Disdained (band), Album Art – (Rambo/Sony Music)
- "Iraena's Ashes", Alpine Fault (band), 2012 – Album Art – (Rare Breed Records)
- "Splintered" and "Unhinged" by A.G Howard. (Abrams Books Publishing) – ISBN 9781419704284
- "On the other side" series by Denise Grover Swank
- "Here"(2011) and "There"(2012) – ISBN 1466394579 / ISBN 978-1466358287
- "The Splendor Falls", Rosemary Clement-Moore (Random House) 2009 – ISBN 9780552561358
- "Dark Descendant", Jenna Black – (Simon & Schuster) – ISBN 978-1451606799
- "Above", Leah Bobet, (Scholastic Publishing), 2012 – ISBN 978-0-54529-670-0
- The Cursed Ones, Nancy Holder, 2010 (Simon & Schuster) – ISBN 978-0857070821
- The Replacement, Brenna Yovanoff, 2011 (Simon & Schuster) – ISBN 0-316-78753-1
- A Brush of Darkness, Allison Pang, (Simon & Schuster), 2011 – ISBN 1439198322
- Coveted series: Compelled and Bitter Disenchantment, Shawntelle Madison – ISBN 0988798530
