= Susan Grant =

American writer

- Education: United States Air Force Academy (1982)
- Occupations: Novelist, pilot
- Writing career
- Genres: Romance, Science fiction
- Notable work: Contact
- Notable awards: RITA award – Paranormal Romance; 2003 Contact
- Website: susangrant.com

Susan Grant is a United States Air Force veteran, pilot, and bestselling American writer who has won numerous awards, including the Romance Writers of America RITA Award.

== Biography ==
Grant was born in New York. She graduated from the United States Air Force Academy in 1982, the third class to include women, and was commissioned as an officer in the United States Air Force. She attended pilot training at Laughlin Air Force Base, Texas and stayed on for three more years as a flight instructor pilot in the T-37. Her next assignment was to Mather Air Force Base, California, flying T-43s as a command pilot. Upon her honorable discharge from the Air Force in 1989, she went on to work for United Airlines as a pilot, flying Boeing 737s, Boeing 747s, and Boeing 777s (current position).

Grant began writing in 1997, taking chapters of her book to work for her colleagues to read. She is now the author of many award-winning, best-selling novellas and novels, including Contact, which won the 2003 Romance Writers of America RITA Award . She lives in Auburn, California.

== Bibliography ==
=== Star series ===
- Star Raider (previously The Star Queen in the anthology The Only One (2003) with Christine Feehan and Susan Squires) (prequel, novella)
- Star King (2000) (RITA finalist)
- Star Prince
- The Star Princess (2003) (previous title Star Rogue)
- Star Champion (previous title The Champion of Barésh) (RITA finalist)
- Star Heroes (contains the novellas Star Puppy and Star Hero)

=== 2176 Freedom series ===
- The Legend of Banzai Maguire (2004)
- The Scarlet Empress (2004)

=== Otherworldly Men series ===
- Guardian Alien (2006) (previous title Your Planet or Mine?)
- Royally Mated (2007) (previous titles My Favorite Earthling and Royal Recruit)
- Cyborg and the Single Mom (2007) (previous title How to Lose an Extraterrestrial in 10 Days)

=== Borderlands series ===
- Warleader (previous title Moonstruck) (RITA finalist)
- Hunting the Warlord’s Daughter (previous title The Warlord's Daughter)
- Raider Born (previous title Sureblood)

=== Sky Mates series ===
- Hawk
- Falcon

=== The Lost Colony series ===
- The Last Warrior

=== Stand-alone novels ===
- Once a Pirate (2000)
- Contact (2002) (RITA winner)
- The Day Her Heart Stood Still (novella)

=== Anthologies ===
- Mission: Christmas (featuring the novella “Snowbound With a Prince”)
- Mortal in Mysteria in the anthology Mysteria (2006) with MaryJanice Davidson, P. C. Cast and Gena Showalter
- The Nanny From Hell in the anthology Mysteria Lane (2008) with MaryJanice Davidson, P. C. Cast and Gena Showalter
- Mysteria Nights (bundle of Mysteria and Mysteria Lane anthologies)

== Awards and reception ==
- 2003 - Romance Writers of America RITA Award, Paranormal Romance – Contact

Publishers Weekly said Once a Pirate "creates a satisfying ending that, with a little suspension of disbelief, holds up to scrutiny".

Contact is an "emotionally charged aviation romance" but has a "slow beginning and implausible premise" according to Publishers Weekly.

The Star King received two PEARL awards and a RITA Award nomination.

Publishers Weekly said of The Legend of Banzai Maguire "this adrenaline-laced, romantic adventure seizes the reader's attention with its gutsy, larger-than-life characters and compelling, colorful vision of the future" and called the book "a strong launch for a very promising series".

Publishers Weekly said of The Scarlet Empress: "Though the novel requires giant leaps of faith, pleasantly shocking twists and turns keep readers enthralled. Grant's writing remains vivid whether describing astounding futuristic advances, depicting a vicious gun volley or drawing a poignant love scene."
