= Oh My Goth =

2006 young adult novel by Gena Showalter

- First edition
- Author: Gena Showalter
- Language: English
- Genre: fantasy coming-of-age
- Publisher: MTV Books
- Publication date: 2006
- Publication place: United States
- ISBN: 1416524746 (mass market paperback edition)

Oh My Goth is an American young adult fantasy coming-of-age novel originally published by MTV Books (a division of Simon & Schuster partnered with MTV) in 2006, written by Gena Showalter. The book features the story of Jade Leigh, a goth high school student often mocked by her peers, who wakes up one morning to discover that her social status has been revamped in an alternate dimension, with goth being the popular fashion style, and the jocks and cheerleaders being unpopular. Showalter inexplicably rewrote the book and had it republished in 2018 by Harlequin Teen, then set this new version to supersede the original version, which by then had been pulled from print production. Showalter had made large-scale changes to the original text, including the main catalyst that causes Jade's world to be altered in the story.

== Original plot ==
Jade Leigh, a high school student in Oklahoma, lives a goth lifestyle with a group of close-knit goth peers. Together they "dabble in the dark arts" (never defined), attend a local hangout that is themed around vampires and serves drinks, and dress up in black clothing and heavy makeup. At home, Jade and her father do not get along; Jade's mother died in a car crash when Jade was a young schoolgirl, after which she became interested in the goth subculture, much to her father's annoyance. At school, Jade is routinely mocked by her peers, particularly by Mercedes, a popular cheerleader from a suburban upbringing. Despite Jade being frustrated that people think she's weird for the way she looks, she often makes fun of the way Mercedes looks, calling her a "Barbie" and a "clone" as insults. Jade notices a new boy in school, a loner named Clarik, and gets into a fight with Mercedes that day. Both girls are sent to the principal's office, where the principal escorts them both to a secluded area of forestry, then suddenly straps the girls down on gurneys, forcibly drugs them, and has them rendered unconscious.

Jade wakes up in her bedroom for what is presumably the following morning of school, having trouble remembering what occurred in the principal's office. She is shocked to find that goth is the most popular fashion in school, with her friends and herself all the most beloved people there. Mercedes and her friends are pariahs who are bullied and treated poorly in this world, and while Jade finds this amusing at first, she soon discovers that she does not like the newfound popularity, nor can she relate anymore to her suddenly popular (and now vain and selfish) goth friends. She begins spending time with Clarik, developing romantic feelings for him; Clarik is bothered by Jade's disregard for Mercedes, and reveals to her that Mercedes is an extremely unhappy person in her private home life. Jade reluctantly finds herself spending time with Mercedes, who is the only other person aside from Clarik who remembers that they are living in an alternate reality induced by the drugging incident in the principal's office. Their tense companionship fails to last, however, when Mercedes and Jade cannot get along due to their aesthetic differences. Mercedes reveals a neglected and psychologically painful life with her family, becoming increasingly self-destructive in the new alternate reality, while Jade breaks down crying, revealing that she watched her mother die in the car crash that had occurred years prior. Jade's mother had encouraged her daughter not to conform to the whims of society before dying in the overturned car, leaving Jade to wait for the paramedics.

Clarik is able to discover how to send himself and the two girls back to their own dimension after he discovers that the high school is working with new secretive laboratory technology. He has Jade and Mercedes lie down while he drugs them into unconsciousness, repeating the process that brought them to their alternate reality in the first place, which brings them into their own proper dimension again. The girls corner the principal and demand answers. The principal reveals that she is Clarik's mother and that the girls were purposely used in an experimental form of discipline by virtual reality technology that will soon be implemented routinely in the school to keep the students in-line. Jade and Mercedes are disgusted by this, but do not interfere. They fall back into their usual social hierarchy, but Mercedes is substantially nicer to Jade, and Jade ceases referring to Mercedes as superficial and stupid.

=== Alternate plot ===
The 2018 republication of Oh My Goth had several notable changes made to the plot, including that the school's role in placing the characters in an alternate dimension is completely removed. Instead, Jade's deceased mother (using supernatural magic when Jade and Mercedes are unexpectedly hit by a vehicle) brings the girls into the alternate dimension to teach Jade a lesson in perceptions about others. Characters were described in more detail, Jade was given more inner dialogue, and Jade and Mercedes are given deeper motivations for their mutual hatred. Mercedes was once Jade's best friend, but has since moved on from her, bullying her and reading her private diary in front of everybody at a house party. Jade, who has decided to make herself purposely aloof and cynical since her mother's death, is off-putting and creepy even to her other goth friends. Jade and Mercedes grow to prefer the alternate reality they are placed in, since Jade and Clarik begin dating and Mercedes finds solace in Jade's group of close-knit goth friends. Showalter also expands more on goth subculture and what it is, as in the 2006 version of the book, she had failed to give a nuanced or accurate portrayal of the subject matter.

== Reason for the rewrite ==
Gena Showalter's rewrite of Oh My Goth was given no formal, cited explanation or reason for the rewrite by Showalter herself, although the 2018 Harlequin Teen republication advertised the book's history of having been rewritten on the front cover and dust jacket flaps of the book itself, while the 2006 version of the book was completely pulled from publication by MTV Books, except for used copies that continued to be sold by third-party distributors and thrift stores. The original 2006 version of the book had a white-and-magenta cover with a photograph of a goth girl's midriff adorned with leather and steel chains, along with the caption "kiss my hall pass" (a mimicry of the slang term "kiss my ass") printed on it. This cover art was credited to a company/artist called Office In Concept. The new 2018 rewrite had a black cover with pink stylized gothic text and a picture of a girl's hands holding onto a diary.

The 2018 rewrite was dedicated to "three amazing women who made this rewrite possible, and helped me [Showalter] breathe life into an old story - Natashya Wilson, Gabrielle Vicedomini and Kristi Yantal." Reviewers and critics suggested that Showalter had rewritten the book due to a backlash against it that the 2006 version had received from Goodreads reviewers, although there is no published record of Showalter ever claiming this herself. As of 2022, it is still unknown exactly why the book was rewritten.

=== Variations ===
- Oh My Goth by Gena Showalter (2006, MTV Books, ISBN 1416524746)
- Oh My Goth by Gena Showalter (2018, Harlequin Teen, ISBN 9781335139726)

== Reception ==
Oh My Goth received mixed reviews from critics in both its original 2006 publication and its rewritten 2018 publication. Kirkus Reviews criticized the book (2018 version) for its heavy-handed message and its lack of racial diversity, but overall had a positive view of the book, stating, "Jade's first-person narration is a little heavy on the "you don't know what you've got till it's gone" message, but it's a fun read nonetheless. Diversity is light; of Jade's three best friends, two have surnames that suggest they are Southeast Asian and Latinx, while all others assume a white default." Professional book blogger and critic Miranda of Miranda Reads, who had read both the 2006 and the 2018 version, said of the original 2006 version of the book, "so, when I heard that Gena was re-writing her Oh My Goth standalone because the reviews were so bad, I just had to check out the original (and the "revamped" version). And the verdict? The original was alright. I honestly don't really see why she would redo it." Miranda was critical of the original 2006 version's "cringe factor", such as the character Jade's usage of the made-up slang term "fright" in place of "cool" as purported common goth slang (which Showalter had specifically created for the book), as well as the idea of the goth characters having a "Coffin Club" where they would plan their own funerals every week. Miranda later reviewed the 2018 rewritten publication, saying of that version, "the characters felt annoying by the end of the first chapter, and I could barely read Jade's perspective because my eyes were rolling so hard. I am mentally, emotionally and physically exhausted after pushing my way through this mess. Ultimately, this rewrite was not a significant improvement… just a bit different from the original."

Other reviewers were more positive about Oh My Goth, often unaware that the edition they had purchased for sale post-2018 was the rewritten version. Jessica's Reading Room praised the 2018 version of the book, saying, "I really liked this book and considering the hardcore culture of goths, it was surprisingly clean! I would absolutely let younger teens read it and hopefully they can learn good things from it! I guess my only issue with this book is that the philosophizing and learning gets a little repetitive. A couple of places start to feel a little like a morality lecture, but those are few and far between." The Compulsive Reader praised the 2006 version of the book, saying of it, "this novel gives a wild and highly entertaining twist on the life of modern teenagers while still remaining true to reality by throwing in many of the issues millions of them face each and every day. It is evident through the dialogue and actions of these genuine and lively characters that Showalter knows teenagers, and what's more, she empathizes with them." Under The Covers Book Blog supported the 2018 rewritten version, while also arguing that Goodreads reviewers had missed the point of which demographic Showalter was trying to target her book towards; "I know there have been bad reviews on Goodreads about this book and I've read a few of them," said writer Angela for Under The Covers Book Blog. "Yes, at some point they make sense if they are looking for a more serious young adult book. I'm not sure what Showalter had in mind writing this book, but I assume she was targeting the younger teen readers. Readers that would enjoy movies like Freaky Friday with Lindsay Lohan or 17 Again with Zac Efron. It's a teen's POV of her life."
