= Lora Leigh =

American writer (born 1965)

- Born: March 6, 1965 (age 61); Ohio, US
- Occupation: Author
- Writing career
- Period: 2003–Present
- Genres: Erotic, Fantasy, Romance
- Notable works: Breeds, Men of August
- Website: loraleigh.com

Lora Leigh (born March 6, 1965) is a New York Times bestselling author of erotic romance novels. Leigh started publishing with electronic publisher Ellora's Cave in 2003. Leigh's longest-running series is The Breeds. She won the 2009 RT Award for erotica. Leigh was born in Ohio and raised in Martin County, Kentucky, US.

== Reception ==
Critical reception for Leigh's books have been mixed over the years. Romantic Times reviewed Soul Deep (Breed Series) giving it two stars out of five for an overabundance of plot contrivances, but giving Lion's Heat a four and a half star rating. Publishers Weekly has both praised (Maverick) and panned (Legally Hot) Leigh's work. Dear Author panned Leigh's work, citing Leigh's Menage a Magick (Ellora Cave Publishing) that the world building was "perfunctory". International Business Times News called Deadly Sins "a fun guilty pleasure". Library Journal noticed the "unvarnished language of erotica" of Coyote's Mate

== Fan events ==
Leigh organizes various events to promote her work and connect with fans. She holds an annual Reader's Appreciation Weekend for her fans; the 2010 event in Huntington, West Virginia, was her fourth. She also hosts discussion groups on her work.

== Bibliography ==
=== Stand Alone ===
Title	Publication Date	Anthology or Collection	Publisher
Time Share: Amelia’s Journey	Mar 2004	Ellora's Cavemen: Tales from the Temple I	Ellora's Cave
Fyre Brand	Jul 2009	Surrender to Fire	Ellora's Cave
Sealed With a Wish	Sep 2009	White Hot Holidays Volume 1	Ellora's Cave
The One	Jun 2011		Ellora's Cave

=== The Breeds ===
Order as suggested by author.

Book #	Title	Publication Date	Mates	Breed	Anthology	Publisher
1	Tempting the Beast	2003	Callan and Merinus	Lion		Ellora's Cave
2	The Man Within	2004	Taber and Roni	Panther		Ellora's Cave
3	Elizabeth’s Wolf	2004	Dash and Elizabeth	Wolf		Ellora's Cave
4	Kiss of Heat	2004	Sherra and Kane	Snow Leopard		Ellora's Cave
5	Soul Deep	2007	Kiowa and Amanda	Coyote		Ellora's Cave
5.5	The Breed Next Door	2006	Tarek and Lyra	Lion	Hot Spell Overcome	Berkley
6	Megan’s Mark	2006	Braden and Megan	Lion		Berkley
7	Harmony’s Way	2006	Harmony and Lance	Lion		Berkley
8	Tanner’s Scheme	2007	Tanner and Scheme	Bengal		Berkley
8.5	Wolfe’s Hope	2004	Wolfe and Hope	Wolf		Ellora's Cave
9	Jacob’s Faith	2004	Jacob and Faith	Wolf		Ellora's Cave
10	Aiden’s Charity	2004	Aiden and Charity	Wolf		Ellora's Cave
10.5	In a Wolf’s Embrace	2007	Matthais and Grace	Wolf	Beyond the Dark Overcome	Berkley
14	Dawn’s Awakening	2008	Dawn and Seth	Cougar		Berkley
11.5	A Jaguar’s Kiss	2008	Saban and Natalie	Black Jaguar	Shifter Overcome	Berkley
12	Mercury’s War	2008	Mercury and Ria	Lion		Berkley
12.5	Christmas Heat	2008	Noble and Haley	Jaguar	The Magical Christmas Cat Too Hot to Touch Paranormal Holiday Anthology Trio	Berkley
13	Coyotes Mate	2009	Del Rey and Anya	Coyote		Berkley
13.5	A Christmas Kiss	2009	Hawke and Jessica	Wolf	Hot for the Holidays Too Hot to Touch Paranormal Holiday Anthology Trio	Berkley
14	Bengals Heart	2009	Cabal and Cassa	Bengal		Berkley
15	Lions Heat	2010	Jonas and Rachael	Lion		Berkley
16	Styx’s Storm	2010	Styx and Storm	Wolf		Berkley
16.5	Primal Kiss	Feb 2011	Creed and Kita	Lion	Primal Too Hot to Touch	Berkley
17	Navarro’s Promise	Apr 2011	Navarro and Mica	Wolf		Berkley
17.5	An Inconvenient Mate	Nov 2011	Malachi and Isabelle	Coyote	Tied with a Bow	Berkley
18	Lawe's Justice	Dec 2011	Lawe and Diane	Lion		Berkley
19	Stygian's Honor	Aug 2012	Stygian and Honor			Berkley
19.5	The Devil’s Due	Jul 2013	Devil and Katie		Enthralled	Berkley
20	Rule Breaker	Feb 2014	Rule and Gypsy	Lion		Berkley
21	Bengal’s Quest	Jun 2015	Graeme and Catarina			Berkley
22	Wake a Sleeping Tiger	Mar 2017	Cullen and Chelsea			Berkley
23	Crossbreed	Sep 2018	Cassandra and Dog			Berkley
33		2019				
34		2019				

=== Men of August ===
Book #	Title	Publication Date	Anthology	Publisher
1	Marly's Choice	2003		Ellora's Cave
2	Sarah's Seduction	2004		Ellora's Cave
3	Heather's Gift	2005		Ellora's Cave
4	August Heat	Dec 2003	12 Quickies of Christmas Volume 1	Ellora's Cave

=== Nauti Boys ===
Book #	Title	Publication Date	Anthology or Collection	Publisher
1	Nauti Boy	2007	The Nauti Boys Collection	Berkley
2	Nauti Nights	2007	The Nauti Boys Collection	Berkley
3	Nauti Dreams	2008	The Nauti Boys Collection	Berkley
4	Nauti Intentions	2009	The Nauti Boys Collection	Berkley
5	Nauti Deceptions	2010	The Nauti Boys Collection	Berkley
6	Nauti Kisses	Aug 2010	Nauti and Wild	Berkley

=== Nauti Girls ===
Book #	Title	Publication Date	Anthology or Collection	Publisher
1	Nauti Temptress	Nov 2012		Berkley
2	Nauti Siren	Apr 2013	Nautier and Wilder	Berkley
3	Nauti Enchantress	Jun 2014		Berkley
4	Nauti Seductress	Nov 2015		Berkley
5	Nauti Angel	Nov 2017		Berkley

=== The SEALs ===
Book #	Title	Publication Date	Anthology or Collection	Publisher
1	Reno's Chance	2005	Honk If You Love Real Men Taken	St Martin's Press
2	Dangerous Games	2007		St Martin's Press
3	For Maggie's Sake	2007	Real Men Do It Better Taken	St Martin's Press
4	Hidden Agendas	2007		St Martin's Press
5	Killer Secrets	2008		St Martin's Press
6	Atlanta Heat	2008	Rescue Me Taken	St Martin's Press

=== Elite Ops ===
Book #	Title	Publication Date	Anthology or Collection	Publisher
1	Wild Card	2008		St Martin's Press
1.5	Night Hawk	2009	Taken on St. Martin Website	St Martin's Press
2	Maverick	2008		St Martin's Press
3	Heat Seeker	2009		St Martin's Press
4	Black Jack	2010		St Martin's Press
5	Renegade	2010		St Martin's Press
6	Hannah’s Luck	2010	Men of Danger	St Martin's Press
6.5	Enigma	Dec 2010		St Martin's Press
7	Live Wire	2011		St Martin's Press

=== Bound Hearts Series ===
Book #	Title	Publication Date	Anthology or Collection	Publisher
1	Surrender	Jul 2009	Surrender To Fire Surrender/Submission	Ellora's Cave Kindle
2	Submission	Sep 2015	Surrender/Submission Submission/Seduction	Ellora's Cave Kindle
3	Seduction	Jul 2004	Submission/Seduction	Ellora's Cave
4	Wicked Intent	Nov 2006	Wicked Sacrifice	Ellora's Cave
5	Sacrifice	Nov 2006	Wicked Sacrifice	Ellora's Cave
6	Embraces	Mar 2007	Shameless Embraces	Ellora's Cave
7	Shameless	Mar 2007	Shameless Embraces	Ellora's Cave
8	Forbidden Pleasure	Jun 2007		St. Martin's Press
9	Wicked Pleasure	May 2008		St. Martin's Press
10	Only Pleasure	Jan 2009		St. Martin's Press
11	Guilty Pleasure	Jan 2010		St. Martin's Press
12	Dangerous Pleasure	Jul 2011		St. Martin's Press
13	Secret Pleasure	Aug 2015		St. Martin's Press
14	Intense Pleasure	Jan 2017		St. Martin's Press

=== The Legacy Series ===
Book #	Title	Publication Date	Publisher
1	Shattered Legacy	Jun 2006	Ellora's Cave
2	Shadowed Legacy	Jul 2006	Ellora's Cave
3	Savage Legacy	Jul 2007	Ellora's Cave
4	Dragon Prime	Nov 2007	Ellora's Cave

=== The Callahans Series ===
Book #	Title	Publication Date	Publisher
1	Midnight Sins	2011	St. Martin's Press
2	Deadly Sins	2012	St. Martin's Press
3	Secret Sins	2012	St. Martin's Press
4	Ultimate Sins	2014	St. Martin's Press

=== Men of Summer ===
Book #	Title	Publication Date	Publisher
1	Loving Lies	2006	Samhain Publishing
2	Wicked Lies	2015	St. Martin's Press
3	Dirty Little Lies	2016	St. Martin's Press

=== Brute Force ===
Book #	Title	Publication Date	Publisher
1	Collision Point	2018	St. Martin's Press
2	Dagger's Edge	2018	St. Martin's Press
3	Lethal Nights	2019	St. Martin's Press

=== Law and Disorder ===
Book #	Title	Publication Date	Coauthor	Publisher
0.1	Moving Violations	Jul 2004	Veronica Chadwick	Ellora's Cave

=== Moving Violations Series ===
Book #	Title	Publication Date	Coauthor	Publisher
1	One Tough Cowboy	Jan 2019	Veronica Chadwick	St. Martin's Press
2	Strong, Silent Cowboy	Mar 2021	Veronica Chadwick	St. Martin's Press
3	Her Renegade Cowboy	Sep 2021	Veronica Chadwick	St. Martin's Press

=== Blood Ties ===
Book #	Title	Publication Date	Anthology or Collection	Publisher
1	Knight Stalker	May 2004	Manaconda	Ellora's Cave

=== Cowboy ===
Book #	Title	Publication Date	Anthology or Collection	Coauthor	Publisher
1	Cowboy and the Captive	Dec 2015	Cops and Cowboys Rugged Texas Cowboy		St. Martin's Press
2	Cowboy and the Thief	Dec 2015	Rugged Texas Cowboy		St. Martin's Press

=== Chronicles of Brydon ===
Book #	Title	Publication Date	Breed	Publisher
1	Broken Wings	2005	Vulture	Ellora's Cave

=== Wounded Warrior ===
Book #	Title	Publication Date	Anthology or Collection	Publisher	ISBN
1	Cooper’s Fall	Jun 2009	Real Men Last all Night Taken	St Martin's Press	
2	Shelia’s Passion	Jan 2012	Legally Hot Taken	St Martin's Press	
3	Erin’s Kiss	May 2015	Hot Alphas	St Martin's Press	ISBN 9781250066886

=== B.O.B ===
Book #	Title	Publication Date	Coauthor	Publisher
1	B.O.B’s Fall	Aug 2004	Veronica Chadwick	Ellora's Cave

=== Wizard Twins ===
Book #	Title	Publication Date	Publisher
1	Menage a Magick	Sep 2003	Ellora's Cave
2	When Wizard’s Rule	Sep 2009	Ellora's Cave
3	Twin Passions	Nov 2012	Ellora's Cave
4	Reluctant Consort	May 2014	Ellora's Cave

=== Kentucky Nights ===
Book #	Title	Publication Date	Publisher	Comments
1	In Isabeau's Eyes	Apr 2019	Berkley	Former Title: Where the Heart Lies

=== Anthologies and collections ===
Anthology or collection	Contents	Publication Date	Coauthor	Publisher
Ellora's Cavemen: Tales from the Temple I	Time Share: Amelia’s Journey	Mar 2004		Ellora's Cave
Manaconda	Knight Stalker	May 2004		Ellora's Cave
Submission/Seduction	Submission Seduction	Jul 2004		Ellora's Cave
12 Quickies of Christmas Volume 1	August Heat	Dec 2004		Ellora's Cave
Honk If You Love Real Men	Reno's Chance	2005		St Martin's Press
Cops and Cowboys	Cowboy and the Captive	2005		Ellora's Cave
Hot Spell	The Breed Next Door	2006		Berkley
Wicked Sacrifice	Wicked Intent Sacrifice	Nov 2006		Ellora's Cave
Beyond the Dark	In a Wolf’s Embrace	2007		Berkley
Real Men Do It Better	For Maggie's Sake	2007		St Martin's Press
Shameless Embraces	Embraces Shameless	Mar 2007		Ellora's Cave
Shifter	A Jaguar’s Kiss	2008		Berkley
Rescue Me	Atlanta Heat	2008		St Martin's Press
The Magical Christmas Cat	Christmas Heat	2008		Berkley
Real Men Last all Night	Cooper’s Fall	Jun 2009		St Martin's Press
Surrender To Fire	Surrender	Jul 2009		Ellora's Cave
Hot for the Holidays	A Christmas Kiss	2009		Berkley
Paranormal Holiday Anthology Trio	Christmas Heat A Christmas Kiss	2010		Berkley
Men of Danger	Hannah’s Luck	Apr 2010		St Martin's Press
Nauti and Wild	Nauti Kisses	Aug 2010		Berkley
Primal	Primal Kiss	Feb 2011		Berkley
The Nauti Boys Collection	Nauti Boy Nauti Nights Nauti Dreams Nauti Intentions Nauti Deceptions	Feb 2011		Kindle
Tied with a Bow	An Inconvenient Mate	Nov 2011		Berkley
Legally Hot	Shelia’s Passion	Jan 2012		St Martin's Press
Nautier and Wilder	Nauti Siren	Apr 2013		Berkley
Enthralled	The Devil’s Due	Jul 2013		Berkley
Taken	Reno's Chance For Maggie's Sake Atlanta Heat Night Hawk Cooper’s Fall Sheila’s Passion	Jul 2014		St Martin's Press
Overcome	The Breed Next Door In a Wolf’s Embrace A Jaguar’s Kiss	Feb 2015		Berkley
Hot Alphas	Erin’s Kiss	May 2015		St Martin's Press
Surrender/Submission	Surrender Submission	Sep 2015		Kindle
Too Hot to Touch	Christmas Heat A Christmas Kiss Primal Kiss	Oct 2015		Berkley
Rugged Texas Cowboy	Cowboy and the Captive Cowboy and the Thief	Dec 2015		St Martin's Press
