= Undead (series) =

2004 book series by MaryJanice Davidson

Undead is a paranormal romance book series that is written by MaryJanice Davidson and published through Berkley Books. The series was first launched in 2004 with the publication of Undead and Unwed, and as of 2016 there are fifteen books in the series, and several accompanying short stories. Davidson attributes the popularity of the series to the absurdism, tone, and believability of the characters. The series was a reaction to what Davidson saw as cliches and unrealistic characters in paranormal romance novels.

== Synopsis ==
The series follows Betsy Taylor, a woman that loses her job and is killed on the day of her thirtieth birthday. She later awakens in a funeral home and discovers that not only is she a vampire but she's the queen of the vampires. At the start of the series Betsy is frequently at odds with fellow vampire Eric Sinclair, however as the novels progress the two fall in love and eventually get married. Betsy also discovers that she has a half-sister, Laura, who is the Antichrist fated to take over the world. The main setting for the series is Saint Paul, Minnesota.

== Book listing ==
The first four volumes have been reprinted as Betsy the Vampire Queen. Volumes 5 - 7 have been reprinted as Betsy Bride of the Vampire and also includes Dead and Loving It (short stories).

=== Undead and Unwed ===
Undead and Unwed is the first adventure of Elizabeth Anne "Betsy" Taylor in the Undead series after her transformation into a vampire. The book was released on March 2, 2004, through Berkley Books and was on the Maclean's bestseller list for April 4, 2004.

Betsy Taylor—former model, newly unemployed secretary, 30, and still single—wakes up after being flattened by a Pontiac Aztek in a tacky coffin wearing cheap knock-off shoes. Her mother is glad she is back, albeit as a vampire, but her stepmother is enraged that Betsy has reclaimed her designer-shoe collection. With a wealthy best friend and a newly acquired doctor pal who is not susceptible to her formidable allure, she sets out to right wrongs but is abducted by Nostro, a tacky 500-year-old vampire who rules the undead roost. It seems that Betsy is an anomaly: a vampire who doesn't burn in sunlight, can fight the urge to feed, and is not repulsed by religious articles, all of which may make her the prophesied Queen of the Vampires. Teaming up with gorgeous vampire Eric Sinclair, who is in her opinion a major pervert, she takes on Nostro and his minions.

Critical reception has been mostly positive. Kliatt gave the audiobook for Undead and Unwed a favorable review, writing that "Wu adds a bevy of emotions to Betsy's otherwise repetitive one-shoe note, making her both likable and amusing."

=== Undead and Unemployed ===
Published in 2004, the book follows Betsy Taylor, a newly turned vampire that has to deal with the aftermath of becoming the new Queen of Vampires - a role that has resulted in her marrying the sexy Eric Sinclair. He irritates her, however when multiple vampires end up getting murdered she finds that she must turn to him for help. Knight Ridder gave Undead and Unemployed a favorable review, stating that it was "very silly stuff, but silly done just right." Kliatt also gave the book a favorable review.

=== Undead and Unappreciated ===
Undead and Unappreciated is the third novel in the Undead series. The breezily written paranormal romance novel introduces a major character to the series: Laura, Betsy's half-sister and the daughter of the Devil herself.

The book marks the series' first time being printed in hardback and was listed on the Wall Street Journal 's hardcover bestseller list for July 14, 2005.

The novel has two prologues. The first prologue relates how the devil, out of boredom, possessed a "not very nice" woman and gave birth to a daughter; however, the devil soon returned to Hell, since she preferred it to living with a newborn. The devil's daughter, Laura, was given up for adoption by her biological mother, Antonia, for whom the possession was like a fugue state. Ironically, Laura is adopted by a Presbyterian minister and his wife, the Goodmans. The second prologue introduces the recently turned vampire Betsy Taylor, the heroine of the Undead series of paranormal romance novels, as she crashes a meeting of Alcoholics Anonymous, where she hopes to learn techniques to control her thirst for blood. The two prologues are related because Laura is Betsy's half-sister, sharing the same father; the not-very-nice Antonia is Betsy's stepmother.

This third novel of the series has thirty-five chapters and, as usual, is told from the point of view of Betsy (first-person narrative). The early chapters introduce Betsy, who has become the Queen of the Vampires through odd circumstances, and her circle of friends/roommates. Her best friend is the very cool and very wealthy Jessica, whom she's known since the seventh grade; Jessica is patient with Betsy and supportive. Another close friend and confidante is Marc Spangler, an emergency-ward physician. Other major human characters include Betsy's father and stepmother Antonia ("the Ant"), who are expecting a baby, Betsy's professor mom Elise (a Civil War historian) and a policeman, Nick Berry. On the vampire side, Betsy is betrothed to the earnest Eric Sinclair, now King of the Vampires; although Eric is smitten with her, Betsy is not enthusiastic.

The novel is framed by a minor story, a wedding between a vampire and a human, Andrea Mercer and Daniel Harris, who are friends with Betsy. Such marriages are almost unheard-of because vampires had traditionally viewed human beings as "sheep", that is, as food rather than romantic partners. In an early chapter, Betsy is asked to preside at the wedding; she does so in the final chapter, quoting from Romeo and Juliet: "what love can do, that dares love attempt". Throughout the novel, Betsy reminds herself that she needs to prepare for the wedding; Betsy's distractions are also highlighted by noting when she forgets about the upcoming wedding.

The plot begins in earnest when Betsy receives a non-invitation to her stepmother's baby shower; the shower is scheduled for daylight hours, making it impossible for vampires to attend. To reinforce the snub, Betsy's weak-willed father visits Betsy at home to ask her to stay away, where he lets slip that the new baby is Antonia's second child. Betsy and her friends confirm this revelation from Antonia herself, who describes unwillingly how she woke up with no memories of the preceding ten months, and dropped the baby girl, Laura, off at the hospital.

Much of the novel revolves around the search for Laura and getting to know her. Laura turns out to be a beautiful but bashful girl just beginning college, and eager to do the right thing for everyone. She's very sweet-natured and wholesome, always seeking peaceful solutions, and making friends with everyone, even people with difficult tempers. Getting to know Laura, Betsy likes her (although she envies her beauty) and can't bring herself to tell her about her sordid vampiric life or that Laura herself is the "spawn of Satan" and destined to conquer the world.

Before finding Laura, Betsy is frustrated by not knowing enough and resolves to read the Book of the Dead, a holy relic for vampires analogous to the Bible. The Book was written by an insane vampire who could see the future; unfortunately, it also drives anyone reading it insane. Throwing caution to the wind, Betsy reads the Book for several hours. The Book describes Betsy's ascension to Queen of the Vampires and her marriage to Eric, and also predicts that her half-sister Laura is fated to take over the world. Unfortunately, the book drives Betsy insane or, rather, changes her into a traditionally thinking vampire, as shown by the novel's first-person perspective. In that state, she attacks her human friends Jessica and Marc, indulges unbridled passions with her consort Eric, and tries to kill his vampire assistant Tina, who defeats her handily. She wakes up with a bruised head, a recovered sanity and much remorse – and also a new power, to awaken before sunset, which she uses to take Laura to Antonia's baby shower, so that Laura can meet her birth mother. Throughout the remainder of the novel, she tries to recover her friends' trust, particularly Jessica's, and also make amends with Eric.

The novel's climax occurs in a nightclub, Scratch. Betsy inherited the club, but the vampire staff are unhappy with her non-traditional changes, including not allowing them to drink blood from humans or kill them. The staff form a union and strike to demand better "working conditions". As their bargaining chip, the staff kidnap Betsy's half-sister Laura, mistaking her for an ordinary human girl. Unfortunately for them, they handle her too roughly and, despite her dislike of violence, Laura begins killing them with weapons formed from hellfire. Eric joins them and the three together win the fight with the vampires. Laura reveals that she'd known all along about Betsy and about herself, but she was waiting for Betsy to trust her enough. Laura is convinced that she can overcome her demonic heritage and be a good person, although she also displays a touch of temper. Later, Betsy meets the Devil herself—resembling a wonderfully dressed Lena Olin—who reveals that Laura will indeed take over the world.

The novel is also marked by several minor stories that contribute to characterizing Betsy and her friends. It opens with a semi-serious discussion between Marc and Betsy about his recovery from alcoholism. Also near the beginning, Eric and his long-time assistant Tina return from a trip to Europe; Eric gives Betsy a little shoe necklace, playing on Betsy's well-known weakness for shoes and characterizing how much he cares for her. Betsy's compassion is highlighted by her treatment of "George", one of the Fiends she inherited from another vampire vanquished in an earlier novel. Fiends are vampires that have been driven insane, unable to speak or reason, by denying them blood. Most of the Fiends are being tended to by Betsy's vampire friend Alice, but George continually escapes and makes his way to Betsy's house. Betsy begins to feed him her own blood, and George begins to recover his sanity by learning to crochet.

Undead and Unappreciated was reviewed by Booklist, Publishers Weekly, and the Chronicle.

=== Undead and Unreturnable ===
The fourth novel in the Undead series, begins at Christmastime in the Kingdom of the dead (Minneapolis), which is complicated as it sounds. Betsy Taylor isn't going to let a little thing like death and blood-drinking stop her from enjoying the holidays or planning her upcoming spring wedding to drop-dead gorgeous vamp Eric Sinclair. But all is not merry and bright-Betsy is plagued by ghosts who demand her help in rectifying their past mistakes, and a serial killer is on the loose. With his victims all being, blond women. Besty fits the profile exactly...

The book starts out with the knowledge that Betsy is technically dead, however everyone but close family and friends think that she is still alive. In Betsy's life she has a stepmother, Antonia (the Ant) who gives birth to a younger brother, Jon, and her best friend, rich Jessica, and Laura, is technically her half-sister but also the devil's daughter after Satan possessed her stepmother (The Ant who gave her up for adoption to, ironically, the Goodman's). She also receives attention from a human boy who is a past member of a gang of vampire slayers. She also has a gay human friend called Marc, a doctor she saved in the first novel from suicide and a human policemen who is a former flame named Nick Berry.

Aside from all of this she has vampire servants who work for her and a hostage wild vampire dubbed George the Fiend. George is a wild vampire created by a 500-year-old vampire Betsy killed. She feeds him with her blood to make him stronger and Jessica teaches him different things such as crocheting. Laura later attacks George the Fiend thinking her mother (Satan) is using him to annoy her and meddle in her life. After Betsy tries to break up the fight Laura stabs her with a sword forged by Hellfire that kills magical creatures, however it doesn't kill her. After this Laura is sent to feed him.

Eric and Betsy fight after she reveals she can hear his thoughts during sex. Eric is hurt she doesn't tell him earlier and goes back to his room which causes Betsy to point out that he hasn't fully committed to their relationship.

Also, in an attempt to connect with her people Betsy starts an advice column intended for new vampires which others deem as stupid. Also, the human boy, with the decidedly shady past as an ex-vampire slayer, decides to write her life story as a fiction story and publish it through his university course, however Sinclair and his best friend Tina wipe his memory of it to save Betsy from exposure.

After a serial killer known as the "Driveway Killer" kills her stepmother's next door neighbor a ghost starts plaguing Betsy. Laura and her set out to find him and discover him in a rundown house with a hostage. Laura kills him and the two set the hostage free.

Betsy finds herself somewhat frightened of Laura doing the fight scene in which the overtake the serial killer and set the hostage free.

In this novel it seems that Antonia knows that Laura is her daughter.

The book has received reviews from Kliatt, Booklist, and the Library Journal.

=== Undead and Unpopular ===
Published in 2006, Undead and Unpopular begins with Betsy Taylor, Queen of Vampires, celebrating her 31st birthday and her 1st anniversary of being dead (or perhaps that should be undead.) She has told her friends that she doesn't want a party but she is sure that they are planning a surprise party for her.

She is trying to plan her summer wedding to Sinclair but it doesn't help that he is avoiding having anything to do with it and deciding to give up drinking blood in honour of her birthday is just making her cranky. And nobody likes a cranky vampire.

Jessica, her best friend since childhood, has been diagnosed with cancer and this leads Betsy to think that maybe converting her friend to become a vampire might be a good idea.

With a delegation of European vampires arriving to pay their respects to her, a baby brother to babysit, unexpected guests dropping by and a phone that just won't stop ringing she has plenty to keep her occupied. And that's before she deals with the zombie in the attic....

The book received a review from Kliatt. Booklist,

=== Undead and Uneasy ===
Undead and Uneasy was published in 2007. In the days leading up The Big Day, Vampire Queen Betsy Taylor seems to have a full house - and the wedding guests have yet to arrive. Along with her human buddies, there's a ghost, a werewolf, and a Fiend crashing at her place. And though her fiancé, Vampire King Eric Sinclair, conveniently disappears when the conversation turns to seating charts and flower arrangements, he does manage to make his oh-so-sexy presence known at other moments.

Betsy knows the next few weeks won't be smooth sailing - but she never expects just what's in store for her. Cold feet are no surprise, especially with an undead groom. But when Sinclair truly goes missing - and not just to avoid wedding preparations - along with most of her friends and loved ones, Betsy is frantic. Alone and afraid for the fate of everyone she loves, Betsy can't trust anyone as she tries to find them and whoever is behind all the disappearances. And what happens next will shake the foundation of the vampire world forever in the bestselling series that "breath(es) new life into conventional vampire lore."*

The book received reviews from Kliatt, the Coventry Evening Telegraph, Publishers Weekly, and Booklist.

=== Undead and Unworthy ===
This 2008 edition to the series has Betsy Taylor, back to rule the nights as Vampire Queen––and survive the days as a new suburban bride. But it's not all marital bliss. Betsy's husband, Sinclair, has been perusing The Book of the Dead, Betsy's being hounded by a ghost who's even more insufferable in death than in life, and a pack of formerly feral vampires has decided to pay an unwelcome visit...

=== Undead and Unwelcome ===
The eighth book in the Undead series was released on June 2, 2009. Betsy Taylor has problems that only a vampire queen/suburban wife could possibly understand. Such as taking the body of her werewolf friend Antonia—who died in her service—to Cape Cod, where she's not sure if the Wyndham werewolves will welcome her with fangs or friendship. Meanwhile, her posse back in St. Paul is sending frantic e-mails alerting Betsy to her half-sister's increasingly erratic behavior. Looks like the devil's daughter is coming into her own—and raising hell. The book was reviewed by Booklist.

=== Undead and Unfinished ===
In the ninth book in the series, Satan wants her daughter Laura (Betsy's half-sister), who is the antichrist, to visit Hell so she could understand her heritage. But Satan says Laura would need Betsy to accompany her. Betsy agrees, but only under the condition that Satan fix things so that Betsy can read the Book of the Dead for more than just a few minutes. Reading it for more than a few minutes at a time drives a person insane.

Betsy and Laura visit Hell, which results in a time-travelling journey that reveals the history of Betsy's husband, Sinclair, and has some serious consequences.

The book was reviewed by Booklist and was on the Publishers Weekly Bestseller List for July 15, 2010.

=== Undead and Undermined ===
Undead and Undermined is the tenth book in the Undead series, by MaryJanice Davidson. It was released on July 5, 2011, and was reviewed by the Library Journal.

After her time traveling stint with Laura, Betsy comes back from hell. When she returns home, she's shocked to find that things have been changed. Nick is back and no longer hates her, Jessica is pregnant and Garrett, aka George the Fiend, is alive. While Betsy struggles to accept this new reality, she discovers that an unwelcome guest traveled back with her to the present. Between fighting with her sister the Antichrist and a shoe induced panic attack, she has her hands full. Just when things can't get much worse, she returns to hell to make a deal with the devil herself.

=== Undead and Unstable ===
Undead and Unstable was published in 2012. Everyone in Vamp Central is in mourning for Marc, who committed suicide to prevent a disastrous future. There is a heated debate over whether to let him rest in peace or to raise him from the dead. Just when things have reached an impasse, Marc is found lurking around the attic newly undead. While Betsy is dealing with this, a visitor from the future arrives and waits for her to do something, and so does the devil, but she has no idea what either of them wants. Eventually Betsy unintentionally gives both unwelcome visitors what they want, which changes the course of the future.

=== Undead and Unsure ===
Betsy's in deep trouble again. Thanks to her, the devil is dead and the Antichrist isn't happy about it. To get her sister to speak to her again, Betsy does what she does best: irritate people. Her sister becomes so exasperated that Betsy gets her way, and makes Laura promise to show up for Thanksgiving. During a late Thanksgiving dinner, Jessica's pregnancy seems less than normal and Laura becomes angry again. Betsy is dragged back to Hell, where Laura abandons her. She is left to figure out how to get the hell out of Hell on her own, which she has no idea how to do.

=== Undead and Unwary ===
For Elizabeth Taylor, Queen of the Undead, it's business as usual. When she isn't avoiding going to Hell to become co-ruler or complaining about her life, she's adjusting to things yet again. Marc and Tina are suddenly best friends, Jessica and Dick-Not-Nick are doting new parents, and her vampire husband is paying more attention to his two puppies than her. Eventually, her responsibilities in Hell catch up to her. Hell is still nothing more than a misty void of nothingness, until Betsy runs into a familiar soul or two. Before she knows it, Hell has some semblance of a place again. The new Hell is now a huge mall, complete with a directory and a Macy's. Between coming up with new punishments, like trying on shoes at Payless that never fit, she actually begins to have fun with the job. Just when she's getting into the swing of things, her father makes a reappearance. Betsy gets through things with a little help from her friends, two mischievous babies, and strangely enough, a lawnmower. Hell better watch out, because their new ruler is just getting started.

=== Undead and Done ===
October 24, 2016 Readers will celebrate the strong conclusion of Davidson's once-groundbreaking blend of humorous women's fiction and paranormal romance in its 12th volume (after Undead and Unforgiven). Betsy, queen of the vampires and shoe-loving ruler of Hell-as-the-Mall-of-America, is determined not to let her half-sister Laura (the self-righteous former Antichrist) set the terms for the vampires' come-out. She asks Fred the mermaid for assistance, which becomes all the more necessary when the Wyndham werewolves decamp nearby, worried about their anonymity. Betsy proves she's a good deal less vapid than given credit for by turning a theological bee in her bonnet into an innovative parole program for some of Hell's most well-behaved denizens, though her constant mental exposition is deservedly and funnily mocked by her hunky consort Sinclair. For those who once loved the series, which has faltered in recent installments, this provides a proper send-off. Agent: Evan Gregory, Ethan Ellenberg Literary.

== Short stories ==
- "Dead Girls Don't Dance" in Cravings (Jove, 2004)
- "Biting in Plain Sight" in Bite (Jove, 2004)
- "The Incredible Misadventures of Boo and the Boy Blunder" in Kick Ass (Berkley, 2005)
- "A Fiend in Need" in Dead and Loving It (Berkley, 2006)
- "Undead and Wed: A Honeymoon Story" in Dead Over Heels (Berkley, 2008)
- "Undead and Underwater" in Undead and Underwater (Berkley, 2013)
- "Unwavering" in Undead and Unmistakable (Self Published through Amazon, 2017)

== See also ==
- The Wyndham Werewolves Series
- Undead
