= Taillefaire =

Taillefaire may refer to

- Lady Callista Taillefaire, character in novels by Laura Kinsale

== See also ==
- Germaine Tailleferre (1892 - 1983), French composer
