= Laura Griffin =

American novelist

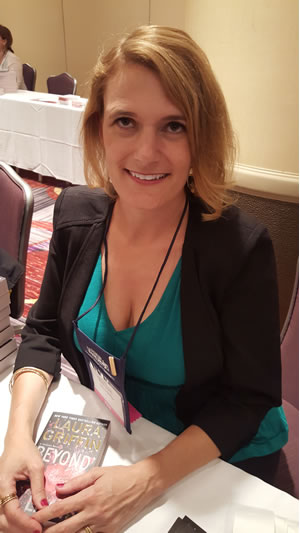
- Laura Griffin at the Romance Writers of America Conference, July 2015
- Born: 1973 (age 52–53)
- Occupation: Novelist
- Writing career
- Pen name: Laura Griffin
- Genre: romantic suspense
- Notable awards: RITA award – Best Romantic Suspense; 2010 Whisper of Warning; RITA award – Best Romantic Suspense; 2013 Scorched
- Website: www.lauragriffin.com

Laura Griffin (born 1973) is a New York Times and USA Today bestselling American author of romantic suspense. She has won Romance Writers of America RITA Award for Best Romantic Suspense twice, as well as the Daphne du Maurier Award.

== Biography ==
Griffin started her career as a journalist and preferred hard-news stories. She attributes her experience to her desire to write suspense fiction, since she's able to make justice prevail and give the characters happy endings. "As a reporter, you cover a lot of stories that go unresolved or do not end happily."

She grew up reading Nancy Drew books, and as she grew older, Stephen King and Patricia Cornwell. "I love King and Cornwell because their books go above and beyond scary. To me it's the characters that make them so compelling — I care about the people, so I can't stop turning the pages to see what happens to them."

In 2013, Griffin teamed up with bestselling author Allison Brennan to co-write a female detective series. Since they were both with different publishers, they decided to self-publish this series.

She currently resides in Austin, Texas.

== Bibliography ==
=== Alpha Crew series ===
- At the Edge. March 2016
- Edge of Surrender. March 2016
- Cover of Night. September 2017
- Total Control. September 2019

=== Borderline ===
- 1. One Last Breath. September 2007
- 2. One Wrong Step. April 2008

=== Glass Sisters ===
- 1. Thread of Fear. October 2008
- 2. Whisper of Warning. April 2009

=== Tracers ===
- 1. Untraceable. November 2009
- 2. Unspeakable. July 2010
- 2.5 "Unstoppable". October 2010
- 3. Unforgivable. December 2010
- 4. Snapped. September 2011
- 5. Twisted. April 2012
- 6. Scorched. November 2012
- 7. Exposed. June 2013
- 8. Beyond Limits. February 2015
- 9. Shadow Fall. September 2015
- 10. Deep Dark. May 2016
- 11. At Close Range. January 2017
- 12. Touch of Red. October 2017
- 13. Stone Cold Heart. April 2019

=== Moreno & Hart Mysteries ===
co-author Allison Brennan

- 1. Crash and Burn. September 2013
- 2. Hit and Run. July 2014
- 3. Lost and Found. January 2016

=== Texas Murder Files series ===
- 1. Hidden. August 2020
- 2. Flight. March 2021
- 3. Midnight Dunes. May 2022

=== Wolfe Security series ===
- 1. Desperate Girls. August 2018
- 2. Her Deadly Secrets. July 2019

=== Stand-alone works ===
- Far Gone. April 2014
- Nightfall. April 2013
- Surrender at Dawn. June 2011
- Last Seen Alone. September 2021

== Awards and reception ==
- 2010: Romance Writers of America RITA Award for Best Romantic Suspense for Whisper of Warning
- 2013: Romance Writers of America RITA Award Finalist for Best Romantic Suspense for Twisted
- 2013: Romance Writers of America RITA Award for Best Romantic Suspense for Scorched

Griffin has also received several starred reviews from Publishers Weekly, as well as a Romantic Times Top Pick.

Several of her novels made the New York Times and USA Today bestseller lists. Twisted reached the USA Today list at #132 in April 2012; Scorched reached #89 in November 2012; Exposed reached #139 in July 2013; and Beyond Limits reached #85 in February 2015.

Awards
Preceded by Cindy Gerard	Winner of the RITA Award for Best Romantic Suspense; 2010	Succeeded by Karen Rose
Preceded by J.D. Robb	Winner of the RITA Award for Best Romantic Suspense; 2013	Succeeded by Carolyn Crane
