= Joanna Bourne =

American novelist

Joanna W. Bourne
- Joanna Bourne at Romance Writers of America Conference, July 22, 2015, New York, NY
- Citizenship: United States
- Education: Goucher College; Georgetown University
- Occupation: Author
- Writing career
- Language: English
- Period: Contemporary
- Genre: Romance novels
- Notable works: My Lord and Spymaster, The Black Hawk
- Notable awards: RITA award – Regency Historical Romance; 2009 My Lord and Spymaster; RITA award – Historical Romance; 2012 The Black Hawk

Joanna Watkins Bourne is an American, best-selling author of historical romance novels set in Europe during the Napoleonic wars. Her novels about a group of spies have won numerous awards. Her books have been described as "witty, beautifully descriptive, [and] cleverly plotted". The Spymaster's Lady is frequently cited as a reader favorite, with a spy hero who is both 'alpha' and 'beta' and a spy heroine who is "brave and clever". Rogue Spy, which features a code-breaker and a British service agent, was listed by Library Journal as one of the ten best romances of 2014.

== Biography ==
Joanna Bourne graduated from Goucher College and Georgetown University. After working as a research analyst for the Congressional Research Service in Washington, D.C., she taught English in Africa. Then she joined the State Department as a Foreign Service Officer. She has lived in England, France, Germany, Nigeria, Iran, and Saudi Arabia. She currently lives in the Blue Ridge Mountains.

Bourne's first novel, Her Ladyship’s Companion, was published in 1983 by Avon. She did not write her second novel until 25 years later.

== Bibliography ==
- Her Ladyship's Companion (1983)
- Spymaster's Lady (2008)
- My Lord and Spymaster (2008)
- The Forbidden Rose (2010)
- The Black Hawk (2011)
- Rogue Spy (2014)
- Beauty Like the Night (2017)

== Awards and reception ==
Awards for Joanna Bourne
Year	Nominated work	Category	Award	Result	Notes	Ref.
2009	My Lord and Spymaster	Regency Historical Romance	Romance Writers of America RITA Award	Won		
2009	The Spymaster's Lady	Best Historical Romance	Romance Writers of America RITA Award	Finalist		
2009	The Spymaster's Lady	Romance	RUSA Reading List	Won		
2011	The Forbidden Rose	Best Historical Romance	Romance Writers of America RITA Award	Finalist		
2012	The Black Hawk	Historical Romance	Romance Writers of America RITA Award	Won		
2014	Rogue Spy	Top Ten Best Romances of 2014	Library Journal Best Books 2014	Listed		
