= Alexis Daria =

American romance writer

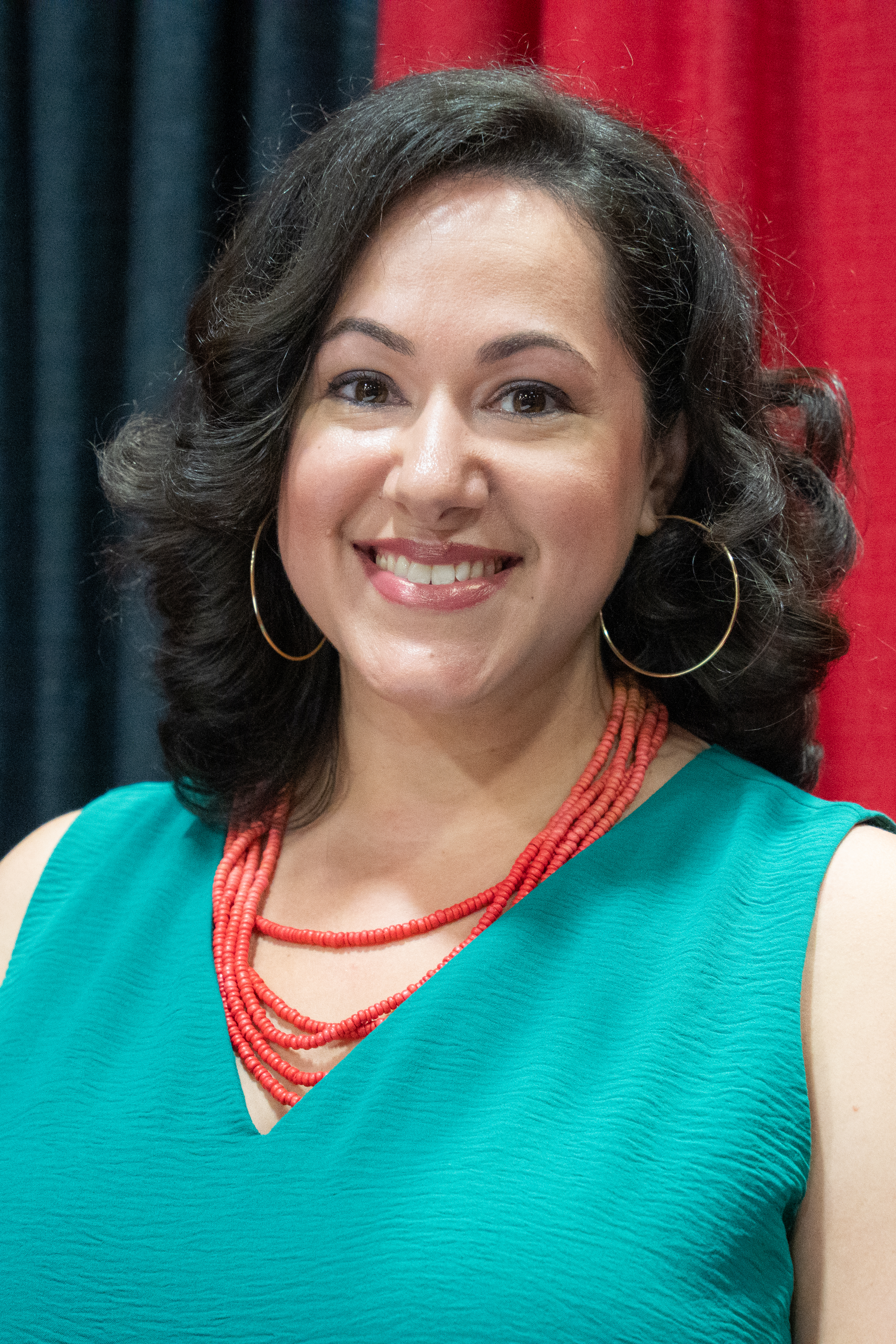
- Daria at National Book Festival 2025
- Occupation: Writer
- Writing career
- Genre: Romance
- Notable works: Take the Lead, You Had Me at Hola
- Notable awards: RITA award – Best First Book; 2018 Take the Lead
- Website: alexisdaria.com

Alexis Daria is an American writer of romance novels. Her most well known book is You Had Me at Hola. Her 2018 debut novel Take the Lead received a Romance Writers of America RITA Award.

The cover of You Had Me at Hola was designed by illustrator Bo Feng Lin.

Daria has a bachelor's degree in Computer Arts. She currently resides in New York City.

== Bibliography ==
=== Novels ===
- Dance With Me (originally published 2017, re-published 2025)
- Take the Lead (St. Martin's Press, 2018)
- You Had Me at Hola (Avon, 2020)
- A Lot Like Adiós (HarperCollins, 2021)
- Along Came Amor (HarperCollins, 2025)
- The Holiday Hookup List (Amazon Publishing, 2025)

=== Novellas ===
- Dance All Night (2018)
- What the Hex (2022)

=== Short stories ===
- "Solstice Dream"
- "Solstice Miracle"
- "All I Want for Nochebuena" in Amor Actually (2021)

== Awards and reception ==
- 2018 - Romance Writers of America RITA Award, Best First Book – Take the Lead
- 2021 - New York Public Library Best Books for Adults 2021 – A Lot Like Adiós
