= Angela Quarles =

American novelist

- Occupation: Writer
- Writing career
- Language: English
- Years active: 2012–present
- Genres: time travel romance, contemporary romance
- Notable work: Must Love Chainmail
- Website: www.angelaquarles.com

Angela Quarles is an American time travel and contemporary romance author who has published 9 novels. Her novel Must Love Chainmail won the 2016 RITA Award for Best Paranormal Romance. Her debut novel Must Love Breeches made the USA Today bestseller list the week of November 5, 2015.

== Life ==
Angela Quarles lives in Mobile, Alabama and owns a bookstore called The Haunted Bookstore. She graduated with a bachelor's degree from Emory University and a master's from Georgia State University.

== Writing ==
Quarles has published 9 novels.

Quarles likes to write stories set in alternative universes because she gets "to play 'what if' with history. It allows me a little more freedom than a genre such as historical fiction."

Quarles debut novel Must Love Breeches was praised by USA Today as "a delicious twist on historical drama and romance.". Library Journal praised her second novel, Must Love Chainmail, saying, "There are many time travel novels, but this one stands out for its very authentic approach to the perils and experiences of traveling through time to another culture."

== Awards and honors ==
Must Love Breeches, the first book in her Must Love time travel romance series, debuted on the USA Today bestseller list at #149 on Nov. 5, 2015. Must Love Chainmail, the second book in her Must Love time travel romance series, won the 2016 RITA Award from the Romance Writers of America.

Her steampunk romance novel Steam Me Up, Rawley was selected by Library Journal as Best Self-Published Romance of 2015.

== Selected bibliography ==
=== Novels ===
Must Love series

- Must Love Breeches (2014)
- Must Love Chainmail (2015)
- Must Love Kilts (2016)
- Must Love More Kilts (2017)

Stolen Moments series

- Earning It (2017)
- Risking It (2017)
- Deserving It (2018)

Mint Julep & Monocle Chronicles series

- Steam Me Up, Rawley (2015)

=== Novelettes and short works ===
- As You Wish, originally published as Beer and Groping in Las Vegas by Secret Cravings Publishing, 2012
