= Molly O'Keefe =

American novelist

- Occupation: Novelist
- Writing career
- Period: 2001–present
- Genres: Romance, contemporary
- Notable work: Crazy Thing Called Love
- Notable awards: RITA award – Best Contemporary Romance; 2014 Crazy Thing Called Love; RITA award – Best Romance Novella; 2010 "The Christmas Eve Promise
- Website: www.molly-okeefe.com

Molly O'Keefe is an American author of contemporary romance. She is a two-time winner of Romance Writers of America's RITA Award for Best Contemporary Romance for Crazy Thing Called Love in 2014, and for Best Romance Novella for "The Christmas Eve Promise" in 2010.

== Suicide Squad promotion and author reaction ==
Molly O'Keefe received notice in 2016 when one of their books, Between the Sheets, was featured in the second trailer and the ending scene of the 2016 film Suicide Squad, being read by the character Harley Quinn. On August 26, 2016, O'Keefe published an article on Bustle.com, revealing that she had nothing to do with her book appearing in the film, saying that:

"the insulting and ridiculous stereotype of the passive, unhappy, unsatisfied woman who reads romance novels (which has always been bullshit) is utterly obliterated as Harley Quinn sips her tea and turns a page."

== Biography ==
O'Keefe is from a small town outside of Chicago and attended university in St. Louis. She currently lives in Toronto, Ontario, Canada with her husband and two children.

== Bibliography ==
=== Alatore ===
1. His Wife for One Night. Harlequin. February 2011 [2011]. ISBN 9780373716883.
2. Unexpected Family. Harlequin. June 2012 [2012]. ISBN 9780373717835.

=== Boys of Bishop ===
1. Wild Child. Bantam. October 2013 [2013]. ISBN 9780345533715.
2. Never Been Kissed. Bantam. July 2014 [2014]. ISBN 9780345549013.
3. Between the Sheets. Bantam. July 2014 [2014]. ISBN 9780345549037.
4. Indecent Proposal. Bantam. September 2014 [2014]. ISBN 9780345549051.

=== Crooked Creek Ranch ===
1. Can't Buy Me Love. Bantam. June 2012 [2012]. ISBN 9780440423072.
2. Can't Hurry Love. Bantam. July 2012 [2012]. ISBN 9780345525611.
2.5 All I Want for Christmas Is You. Loveswept. November 2013 [2013]. ISBN 9780345542441.
3. Crazy Thing Called Love. Bantam. January 2013 [2013]. ISBN 9780345533692.

=== Into The Wild ===
1. Seduced. Self. May 2014 [2014]. ISBN 9781507776353.
2. Tempted. Self. July 2015. ASIN B00XI2OXLE.

=== The Mitchells of Riverview Inn ===
1. Baby Makes Three. Harlequin. December 2007 [2007]. ISBN 9780373714605.
2. A Man Worth Keeping. Harlequin. April 2008 [2008]. ISBN 9780373714865.
3. Worth Fighting For. Harlequin. August 2008 [2008]. ISBN 9780373715107.

=== The Notorious O'Neills ===
1. The Temptation of Savannah O'Neill. Harlequin. August 2010 [2010]. ISBN 9780373716517.
2. Tyler O'Neill's Redemption. Harlequin. September 2010 [2010]. ISBN 9780373716579.
3. The Scandal and Carter O'Neill. Harlequin. October 2010 [2010]. ISBN 9780373716630.

=== Everything I Left Unsaid ===
1. Everything I Left Unsaid. Random House Publishing Group. October 2015. ISBN 9781101884492.
2. The Truth About Him. Random House. November 2015. ISBN 9781101884515.

=== Stand-alone works ===
- Too Many Cooks. Harlequin. October 2001 [2001]. ISBN 9780373441280.
- Kiss the Cook. Harlequin. March 2003 [2003]. ISBN 9780373441617.
- Cooking Up Trouble. Harlequin. March 2003 [2003]. ISBN 9780373441617.
- Pencil Him In. Harlequin. May 2004 [2004]. ISBN 9780373441891.
- Dishing it Out. Harlequin. April 2005 [2005]. ISBN 9780373442119.
- Family at Stake. Harlequin. August 2006 [2006]. ISBN 9780373713653.
- His Best Friend's Baby. Harlequin. November 2006 [2006]. ISBN 9780373713851.
- Undercover Protector. Harlequin. July 2007 [2007]. ISBN 9780373714322.
- The Son Between Them. Harlequin. December 2008 [2008]. ISBN 9780373715343.
- The Story Between Them. Harlequin. February 2009 [2009]. ISBN 9780373715428.

== Awards and reception ==
- 2005 - Romantic Times Reviewers Choice award for best Flipside for Dishing It Out
- 2007 - Romantic Times Reviewers Choice award for best Superromance for Baby Makes Three
- 2010 - Romance Writers of America RITA Award for Best Romance Novella for The Christmas Eve Promise
- 2014 - Romantic Times Reviewers Choice award for best Contemporary Romance for Between the Sheets
- 2014 - Romance Writers of America RITA Award for Best Contemporary Romance for Crazy Thing Called Love

She has also received starred reviews in Publishers Weekly and Booklist, as well as Top Picks in RT Book Reviews. Kirkus Reviews calls O'Keefe "...a master of explaining—and selling—character motivations.". NPR named Crazy Thing Called Love one of the best Love Story books of 2013.
