= HelenKay Dimon =

- Born: 1967 (age 58–59)
- Occupation: Novelist
- Writing career
- Pen name: Darby Kane
- Genre: Romance
- Notable work: The Fixer
- Notable awards: RITA award – Romantic Suspense; 2018 The Fixer
- Website: helenkaydimon.com

HelenKay Dimon is an American author of contemporary romance novels. Dimon is a past president of the Romance Writers of America.

HelenKay Dimon was born in 1967. The only girl in her generation, Dimon was named for her two grandmothers. She was raised in New Holland, Pennsylvania in a household where reading was encouraged. Dimon particularly enjoyed suspense and mysteries.

After earning a double major in journalism and political science from Syracuse University, Dimon moved to Washington, D.C. to work as the legislative correspondent for her hometown's congressman, Robert Smith Walker. Dimon then attended Wake Forest University School of Law. She was graduated in 1995 and joined a small firm in Rockville, Maryland that focused on family law. She specialized in divorce and custody battles. The work began to take a toll on her; as Dimon noted in an interview, "'I'm not sure what a win is in a divorce custody case because everybody loses.'"

A colleague gave Dimon a few romance novels, insisting Dimon needed at least one happy ending. Dimon enjoyed the novels and in 2001 started writing her own stories. She drew on her love of mysteries and her experiences in Washington, D.C. representing Secret Service, CIA, and FBI agents to craft romantic suspense novels. Dimon submitted three pages of a manuscript to a contest run by author Lori Foster. Foster chose twenty winners, including Dimon, and forwarded their entries to her editor at Kensington Books. Although the editor passed on the manuscript, she encouraged Dimon to keep writing.

Although Dimon was working six or seven days a week as a partner in her firm, she continued to write in the evenings. In May 2005, she signed a contract to sell a novella, "When Good Things Happen to Bad Boys", to the same editor who had rejected her manuscript 18 months previously. A separate two-book contract followed. The first book to be published, Hard Hats and Silk Stockings, included the rewritten pages that she had submitted to the Foster contest. In 2007, Dimon retired from law to write full-time.

Since then, Dimon has sold more than 30 novels and novellas to traditional publishers. Some of her work has been excerpted in Cosmopolitan. Her novel Facing Fire was nominated for a RITA Award in 2016.

Dimon's novels are primarily romantic suspense. Most of her books feature heterosexual couples, but she has also started writing gay pairings.

Dimon served as President of the Romance Writers of America in 2018-2019. Under her leadership, the organization worked to increase diversity and inclusion.

== Awards and reception ==
- 2018 - Romance Writers of America RITA Award, Romantic Suspense – The Fixer
