= Dana Marton =

American author

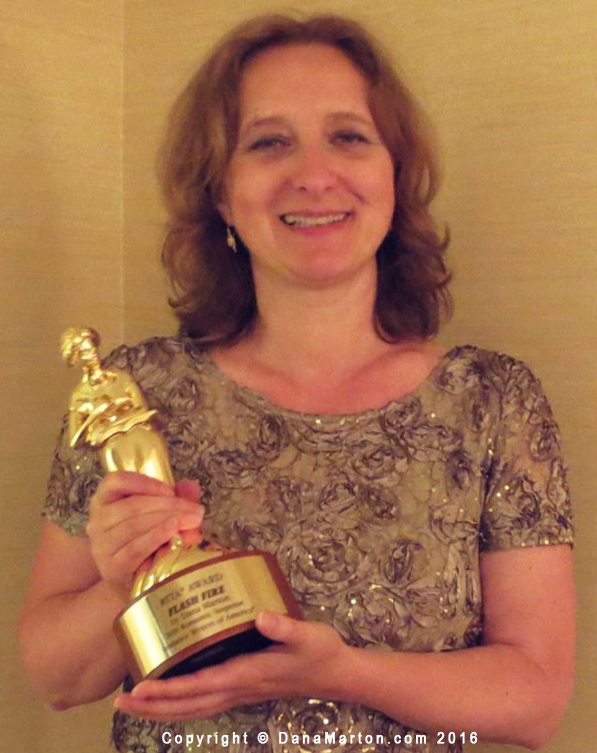
- Dana Marton, 2016
- Occupations: Author, novelist
- Writing career
- Period: 2004 – present
- Genres: Romance and Epic Fantasy
- Subject: Romantic Suspense
- Notable works: CAMOUFLAGE HEART 2006 winner of the Daphne du Maurier Award of Excellence, TALL, DARK AND LETHAL 2008 RITA Award Finalist, FLASH FIRE 2016 RITA Award Winner, GIRL IN THE WATER BookLife Prize Quarter Finalist 2016, DRAGON LORD 2019 RITA Award finalist, SILENT THREAT Daphne du Maurier Award of Excellence and Best Suspense Overall of 2019
- Notable awards: Daphne du Maurier Award of Excellence 2006 & 2019, RITA Award Finalist 2008 & 2019, RITA Award Winner 2016
- Website: www.danamarton.com

Dana Marton is an American author of over fifty novels that have been translated into over a dozen languages and sold more than two million copies worldwide. She is a New York Times and USA Today bestselling author and a winner of the Romance Writers of America RITA Award.

== Bibliography ==
HARLEQUIN TITLES

- Shadow Soldier (October 2004) ISBN 0-373-22806-6
- Secret Soldier (January 2005) ISBN 0-373-22821-X
- The Sheik's Safety (July 2005) ISBN 0-373-22859-7
- Camouflage Heart (October 2005) ISBN 0-373-22875-9 (Daphne du Maurier Award of Excellence)
- Rogue Soldier (February 2006) ISBN 0-373-22902-X
- Protective Measures (May 2006) ISBN 0-373-22917-8
- Bridal Op (August 2006) ISBN 0-373-22933-X
- Undercover Sheik (December 2006) ISBN 0-373-22962-3
- Secret Contract (April 2007) ISBN 978-0-373-69252-1 (RT Book Reviews Top Pick)
- Ironclad Cover (May 2007) ISBN 978-0-373-69258-3 (RT Book Reviews Top Pick)
- My Bodyguard (August 2007) ISBN 978-0-373-69274-3
- Intimate Details (September 2007) ISBN 978-0-373-69280-4
- Sheik Seduction (January 2008) ISBN 978-0373693061
- 72 Hours (April 2008) ISBN 0-373-69322-2
- Sheik Protector (September 2008) ISBN 978-0373693528 (RT Book Reviews Top Pick)
- Tall, Dark And Lethal (December 2008) ISBN 0373693729 (Rita Award Nominee)
- Desert Ice Daddy (March 2009) ISBN 0373693885
- Saved By The Monarch (May 2009) ISBN 978-0373694037 (RT Book Reviews Top Pick)
- Royal Protocol (June 2009) ISBN 978-0373694099
- The Socialite and the Bodyguard (January 2010) ISBN 978-0373694464
- Stranded with the Prince (May 2010) ISBN 978-0373694730
- Royal Captive (June 2010) ISBN 978-0-373-74533-3
- The Spy Who Saved Christmas (October 2010) ISBN 0373695020
- The Black Sheep Sheik (September 2011) (RT Book Reviews Top Pick)
- Last Spy Standing (January 2012) ISBN 978-0373695959
- Spy Hard (June 2012) ISBN 978-0373696253
- The Spy Wore Spurs (July 2012) ISBN 978-0373696314
- Three Cowboys (December 2012) ISBN 978-0373696581

HQ:TEXAS SERIES

- Most Eligible Spy (September 2013) ISBN 978-0373697151
- My Spy (October 2013) ISBN 978-0373697205 (RT Book Reviews Top Pick)
- Spy In The Saddle (October 2013) ISBN 978-0373697267

NON-FICTION

- Many Genres, One Craft: Lessons in Writing Popular Fiction (May 2011) ISBN 978-0938467083

AGENTS UNDER FIRE SERIES

- Guardian Agent (June 2011) ISBN 978-0-9853462-6-3
- Avenging Agent (August 2011) ISBN 978-0-9853462-5-6
- Warrior Agent (October 2011) ISBN 978-0-9853462-7-0
- Agents Under Fire (novella trilogy) (December 2011) ASIN: B006Q2V2J4

BROSLIN CREEK SERIES

- Deathwatch (Broslin Creek #1) (August 2013) ISBN 9780985346294
- Deathscape (Broslin Creek #2) (November 2012) ISBN 9780985346225
- Deathtrap (Broslin Creek #3) (June 2013) ISBN 978-0-9853462-3-2
- Deathblow (Broslin Creek #4) (December 2013) ISBN 978-1-940627-02-1
- Broslin Bride (Broslin Creek #5) (June 2014) ISBN 978-1-940627-04-5
- Deathwish (Broslin Creek #6) (November 2014) ISBN 978-1-940627-06-9
- When You Return To Me (Broslin Creek #6) (November 2015) ASIN: B018LHEVGW
- Broslin Creek Boxed Set (Books 1-3) (November 2013) ISBN 978-1-940627-01-4
- Broslin Creek Boxed Set (Books 4-6) (May 2017) ASIN: B0719KJBQC

PERSONNEL RECOVERY SERIES

- Forced Disappearance (November 2014) ISBN 147782605X
- Flash Fire (November 2015) ISBN 9781940627120 (RITA AWARD Romantic Suspense 2016)
- Girl in the Water October (2016) ISBN 9781940627199

MISSION RECOVERY SERIES

- Silent Threat (January 2018) ISBN 1542047986
- Threat of Danger (June 2018) ISBN 1503950050

OMNIBUS

- Dangerous Attraction Boxed Set (November 2013) ASIN: B00FSY0XGY (with Rebecca York, Patricia Rosemoor, Kaylea Cross, Sharon Hamilton, Jill Sanders, Toni Anderson, Debra Burroughs, Marie Astor, Lori Ryan)

EPIC FANTASY

- Reluctant Concubine (March 2015) ISBN 978-1-940627-09-0 (Previously published as The Third Scroll in 2011)
- Accidental Sorceress (March 2015) ISBN 978-1-940627-08-3
- Guardian Queen (January 2019) ISBN 978-1-940627-39-7

Fiction

- The Secret Life of Sunflowers (as Marta Molnar) (July 2022) ISBN 9781940627489

== Awards and reception ==
- 2016 - Romance Writers of America RITA Award, Romantic Suspense – Flash Fire

Marton also won the Daphne du Maurier award in 2005 for her fourth book, Camouflage Heart. In 2008, her book Tall, Dark and Lethal was nominated for the prestigious RITA Award. Deathscape reached the #1 spot on Amazon's Romantic Suspense Bestseller list in 2012. Her fantasy novel Reluctant Concubine held the #1 spot in its Amazon category for over a month in 2015. She has written over twenty five novels for Harlequin Intrigue.

Kirkus Reviews calls her writing "compelling and honest." Her writing has been featured in the USA Today 'Happy Ever After' section and acclaimed as "must-read romantic suspense".
