= Lauryn Chandler =

American novelist

- Occupation: Novelist
- Writing career
- Pen name: Wendy Warren
- Period: 1993–present
- Genre: Romance
- Notable works: Oh Baby!, Her Very Own Husband
- Notable awards: RITA award – Traditional Romance; 1995 Oh Baby! RITA award – Traditional Romance; 1997 Her Very Own Husband

Lauryn Chandler is an American author of contemporary romance novels. She has also written under the pseudonym Wendy Warren.

Chandler has twice been the recipient of the highest honor given to romance novelists, the Romance Writers of America's RITA Award.

== Bibliography ==
=== As Lauryn Chandler ===
- Mr. Wright (1993)
- Romantics Anonymous (1993)
- Oh, Baby! (1994)
- Her Very Own Husband (1996)
- Just Say I Do (1997)
- The Drifter's Gift (1997)

=== As Wendy Warren ===
- Dakota Bride (2002)
- The Oldest Virgin in Oakdale (2002)
- Making Babies (2005)
- Undercover Nanny (2005)
- The Boss and Miss Baxter (2006)
- Once More, at Midnight (2007)
- The Baby Bargain (2007)

=== Omnibus ===
- Wanted: One Father / Making Babies (2005) (with Penny Richards)
- Other Side of Paradise / Undercover Nanny (2005) (with Laurie Paige)

== Awards and reception ==
Awards for Lauryn Chandler
Year	Nominated work	Category	Award	Result	Notes	Ref.
1995	Oh Baby!	Traditional Romance	Romance Writers of America RITA Award	Won		
1997	Her Very Own Husband	Traditional Romance	Romance Writers of America RITA Award	Won		

Chandler has also been twice nominated for Romantic Times Reviewers' Choice Awards.
