= Carla Laureano =

American novelist

- Education: Pepperdine University
- Occupation: Novelist
- Writing career
- Pen name: Carla Laureano; C.E. Laureano
- Genres: Romance, inspirational Young Adult fantasy
- Notable works: Five Days in Skye, The Saturday Night Supper Club
- Notable awards: RITA award – Inspirational Romance; 2014 Five Days in Skye; RITA award – Romance with Religious or Spiritual Elements; 2019 The Saturday Night Supper Club
- Website: carlalaureano.com

Carla Laureano is an American author of inspirational romance and young adult fantasy. She has received two Romance Writers of America RITA Awards.

== Biography ==
Laureano earned a degree in English in 1997 from Pepperdine University where she studied literature and criticism. She has worked as a salesperson, marketing manager, copywriter, and small business consultant. In addition, she wrote for publications produced by the World Health Organization.

She lives in Denver, Colorado with her husband and two sons.

== Bibliography ==
=== As Carla Laureano ===
- The MacDonald Family Trilogy

1. Five Days in Skye. David C. Cook. June 2013 [2013]. ISBN 9780781410427.
2. London Tides. David C. Cook. July 2015 [2015]. ISBN 9781434708229.
3. Under Scottish Stars. Tyndale House Publishers. July 2020 [2020]. ISBN 9781496426291.

- The Supper Club

1. The Saturday Night Supper Club. Tyndale House Publishers. February 2018 [2018]. ISBN 9781496420244.
2. Brunch at Bittersweet Café. Tyndale House Publishers. February 2019 [2019]. ISBN 9781496432704.
3. The Solid Grounds Coffee Company. Tyndale House Publishers. February 2020 [2020]. ISBN 9781496420329.

- Provenance. Tyndale House Publishers. August 2021 [2021]. ISBN 9781496445926.
- Haven Ridge

1. The Broken Hearts Bakery. Laureano Creative Media. April 2023 [2023]. ISBN 9781732794092.
2. The Beacon Street Bookshop. Laureano Creative Media. September 2023 [2023]. ISBN 9781960079039.
3. The Larkspur House. Laureano Creative Media. August 2024 [2024]. ISBN 9781960079053.

=== As C.E. Laureano ===
- The Song of Seare Trilogy

1. Oath of the Brotherhood. NavPress. April 2014 [2014]. ISBN 9781612915876.
2. Beneath the Forsaken City. NavPress. February 2015 [2015]. ISBN 9781612916316.
3. The Sword and the Song. NavPress. September 2015 [2015]. ISBN 9781612916323.

== Awards and reception ==
- 2014 - Romance Writers of America RITA Award, Inspirational Romance for Five Days in Skye
- 2019 - Romance Writers of America RITA Award for Romance with Religious or Spiritual Elements for 'The Saturday Night Supper Club'
- Beneath the Forsaken City, and Oath of the Brotherhood were RT Book Reviews Top Picks.
