= Nisha Sharma (author) =

American romance novelist

Nisha Sharma is an American author of adult and young adult contemporary romance novels featuring South Asian characters. She also writes sci-fi, paranormal, and fantasy romance as Nina Saxena.

== Early life and education ==
Sharma is the daughter of Indian immigrants. She has stated that the Bollywood movies she watched as a child influenced her affinity for romance fiction. Sharma enrolled at Muhlenberg College, where she began a pre-medical track before switching to an English major. She graduated from Muhlenberg College in 2007 and later earned an MFA from Wilkes University. She also holds a JD from Hofstra University.

== Career ==
Sharma published her first novel, My So-Called Bollywood Life, in 2018, after writing the book as her master's thesis at Wilkes University. The novel earned a RITA Award from the Romance Writers of America, making Sharma the first author of South Asian descent to win the award.

Sharma has written three adaptations of the plays of William Shakespeare into novels featuring South Asian characters, a trilogy titled "If Shakespeare Were an Auntie." The series, published by HarperCollins, includes Dating Dr. Dil, based on The Taming of the Shrew; Marriage and Masti, based on Twelfth Night; and Tastes Like Shakkar, based on Much Ado About Nothing. Influenced by James Baldwin, Sharma wrote that she viewed writing adaptations of Shakespeare as a form of decolonization.

As of 2022, Sharma taught a creative writing class at Muhlenberg College.

As of 2024, she is working on a PhD in social justice and English.

== Bibliography ==
=== As Nisha Sharma ===
==== Stand-alone novels ====
- My So-Called Bollywood Life (2018)
- Radha & Jai's Recipe for Romance (2021)
- The Karma Map (2023)
- The Letters We Keep (2024)
- Illusions of Fire (2025)
- The Lotus Inn (2027)

==== The Singh Family ====
- The Takeover Effect (2019)
- The Legal Affair (2020)
- A Singh Family Christmas (2022)
- The Rival Partnership (2026)

==== If Shakespeare Were an Auntie ====
- Dating Dr. Dil (2022)
- Tastes Like Shakkar (2023)
- Marriage & Masti (2024)

=== As Nina Saxena ===
==== Stand-alone novels ====
- Now You See Him (2025)
- M.A.Y.A. (2025)

==== The Shukra Duology ====
- The Pirate Queen (2024)
- The Warrior Queen (2027)
