= Rosemary Clement-Moore =

American novelist

- Occupation: Novelist
- Writing career
- Language: English
- Genre: Romance
- Notable work: Hell Week
- Notable awards: RITA award – Young Adult Romance; 2009 Hell Week

Rosemary Clement-Moore is an American author. She is a native Texan, who has previously worked as a telephone operator, Chuck E. Cheese costumed character, ranch hand, dog groomer, wedding singer, hair model, actress, stage-hand, director, and playwright.

== Overview ==
Her debut novel, Prom Dates from Hell, was published by Delacorte Press in 2007. It is the first in the Maggie Quinn: Girl vs. Evil series. Other books in the Maggie Quinn series are Hell Week, published in 2008, and Highway to Hell, published in 2009. The first two books, Prom Dates from Hell and Hell Week were combined into a single volume, Brimstone, which was released in 2012.

Other publications include The Splendor Falls, published in 2009, and Texas Gothic, published in 2011. Spirit and Dust followed in 2013.

She is the founding president of the Romance Writers of America's Young Adult Special Interest Chapter in 2009.

She is a frequent guest speaker at the Romance Writers of America National Conference, appearing in 2010, 2011, and 2012. She appeared at the Romantic Times Booklovers convention in 2010, 2011, and 2012.

== Maggie Quinn: Girl vs. Evil ==
- Prom Dates from Hell
- Hell Week

Appeared on VOYA's Perfect Tens for 2009

- Highway to Hell

Appeared on ALA's 2010 List of Best Books for Young Adults

== Texas Gothic ==
Texas Gothic received a starred review from Kirkus Reviews on May 15, 2011 and a starred review from School Library Journal. It was included on Kirkus' Best Teen Books of 2011. It went on to appear on ALA's 2012 List of Best Books for Young Adults.

== Awards and reception ==
- 2008 - Romance Writers of America RITA Award finalist, Best First Book – Prom Dates From Hell
- 2009 - Romance Writers of America RITA Award, Young Adult Romance – Hell Week
