= Barbara Dawson Smith =

American novelist

- Education: Michigan State University
- Occupation: Novelist
- Children: 2
- Writing career
- Pen name: Barbara Dawson Smith, Olivia Drake
- Language: English
- Period: 1985–present
- Genre: Romance
- Notable awards: RITA Award
- Website: www.oliviadrake.com

Barbara Dawson Smith is an American writer of historical romance novels. She also writes under the pen name Olivia Drake.

== Biography ==
Barbara Dawson Smith obtained a degree in journalism at Michigan State University. Shortly after graduating she sold her first historical romance only two weeks after sending it to a publisher and joined the Romance Writers of America in 1981.

Smith lives in Houston, Texas with her husband and their two daughters.

== Awards ==
- Dreamspinner: 1990 "Best Historical Romantic Suspense" from Romantic Times
- A Glimpse of Heaven: 1995 "Best Regency Historical" from Romantic Times
- Tempt Me Twice: 2002 RITA Award Best Short Historical
- 2009 - Romantic Times Reviewers' Choice Award finalist, Best Historical Novels – Seducing the Heiress

== Bibliography ==
=== As Barbara Dawson Smith ===
==== Single novels ====
- No Regrets (1985)
- Stolen Heart (1988)
- Silver Splendor (1989)
- Dreamspinner (1990)
- A Glimpse of Heaven (1995)
- Never a Lady (1996)
- Once Upon a Scandal (1997)
- Her Secret Affair (1998)
- Too Wicked to Love(1999)
- Seduced by a Scoundrel (1999)
- The Duchess Diaries (2005)
- Countess Confidential (2006)
- The Rogue Report {2006}

==== Defiant Fletcher Series ====
1. Defiant Embrace (1985)
2. Defiant Surrender (1987)

==== Fire Coleridge Series ====
1. Fire on the Wind (1992)
2. Fire at Midnight (1992)

==== Rosebuds Series ====
1. Romancing the Rogue (2000)
2. Tempt Me Twice (2001)
3. With All My Heart (2002)
4. One Wild Night (2003)
5. The Wedding Night (2004)

==== Anthologies in collaboration ====
- "Candle in the Snow" in CHRISTMAS ROMANCE (1990) – with Catherine Hart and Betina Krahn
- "Beauty and the Brute" in SCANDALOUS WEDDINGS (1998) – with Rexanne Becnel, Jill Jones and Brenda Joyce

=== As Olivia Drake ===
==== Heiress in London Series ====
1. Seducing the Heiress (2009)
2. Never Trust a Rogue (2010)
3. Scandal of the Year (2011)

==== Cinderella Sisterhood Series ====
1. If the Slipper Fits (2012)
2. Stroke of Midnight (2013)
3. Abducted by a Prince (2014)
4. Bella and the Beast (2015)
5. His Wicked Wish (2016)
6. The Scandalous Flirt (2017)

==== Unlikely Duchesses Series ====
1. The Duke I Once Knew (2018)
2. Forever My Duke (2019)
3. When a Duke Loves a Governess (2021)
