= Simone St. James =

Canadian author

- Occupations: TV producer, author
- Writing career
- Language: English
- Period: 2012–present
- Genres: Mystery, Thriller, Historical Fiction, Romance
- Website: www.simonestjames.com

Simone St. James is a Canadian author of mystery, historical fiction, and romance novels. The themes in St. James's novels often include ghosts, crime, and an investigation. She lives outside of Toronto, Canada and had twenty years of experience in the television business before leaving to write full-time. St. James was inspired to write her first book because she wanted to read a ghost story that was creepy but not gory, and that had a romance in it. Since she couldn't find it, she wrote it herself. Although she claims never to have seen a ghost personally, her books are all about the possibility, and specifically about the "what if" moment. The first books written by St. James were set in the 1920s. She decided after that to write for other time periods like the 1950s.

== Selected texts ==
=== The Haunting of Maddy Clare (2012) ===
The Haunting of Maddy Clare, published March 6, 2012 by Berkley Books, is a mystery novel with paranormal and romance elements. The book received two RITA Awards from the Romance Writers of America (Best First Book and Best Novel with Strong Romantic Elements) and an Arthur Ellis Award from the Crime Writers of Canada for Best First Crime Novel.

=== Silence for the Dead (2014) ===
Silence for the Dead, published December 1, 2014 by Thorndike Press, is a mystery novel set in 1919 England. The book received a positive review from Publishers Weekly and was nominated for a Goodreads Choice Award for Horror (2014).

=== The Broken Girls (2018) ===
The Broken Girls, published March 20, 2018 by Berkley Books, is a mystery novel set with two intertwined timelines in Vermont (1950 and 2014). The book received a starred review from Booklist, as well as a positive review from Publishers Weekly. It was nominated for a Goodreads Choice Award for Mystery & Thriller (2018).

=== The Sun Down Motel (2020) ===
The Sun Down Motel, published February 18, 2020 by Berkley Books, is a mystery thriller novel set in 1982 New York. It was a New York Times best seller. It was nominated for the Goodreads Choice Award for Mystery & Thriller and the Ladies of Horror Fiction Award for Best Novel.

=== The Book of Cold Cases (2022) ===
The Book of Cold Cases, published March 15, 2022 by Berkley Books, is a thriller novel with two intersecting timelines (2017 and 1977) in Oregon. The book received a positive review from Publishers Weekly, and Goodreads named it one of the most anticipated books of 2022. The book was also a Goodreads Choice Award nominee for Mystery & Thriller (2022).

== Publications ==
- The Haunting of Maddy Clare (2012) ISBN 9780451235688
- An Inquiry into Love and Death (2013) ISBN 9780451239259
- Silence for the Dead (2014) ISBN 9780451419484
- The Other Side of Midnight (2015) ISBN 9780451419491
- Lost Among the Living (2016) ISBN 9780451476197
- The Broken Girls (2018) ISBN 9780451489388
- The Sun Down Motel (2020) ISBN 9780440000204
- The Book of Cold Cases (2022) ISBN 9780440000235
- Murder Road (2024) ISBN 9780593200384
- A Box Full of Darkness (2026) ISBN 9780593200414
