= Pintip Dunn =

American novelist

- Education: Harvard University (A.B.); Yale Law School (J.D.)
- Writing career
- Years active: 2015-now
- Genre: young adult
- Notable works: Forget Tomorrow, Seize Today
- Notable awards: RITA award – Best First Book; 2016 Forget Tomorrow; RITA award – Young Adult Romance; 2018 Seize Today
- Website: pintipdunn.com

Pintip Dunn is a New York Times best-selling author of young adult fiction. Her Forget Tomorrow series has been translated into four languages. She is a two-time recipient of the RITA Award.

== Personal life ==
Dunn is the daughter of Thai immigrants and grew up in Parsons, Kansas. She attended Harvard University to study English Literature and Language, earning an A.B., and received her J.D. from Yale Law School.

== Career ==
=== Forget Tomorrow series ===
Dunn's debut young adult novel, Forget Tomorrow (Entangled: Teen, 2015), the first in a series, is set in a sci-fi world in which people can see their own future, where sixteen-year-old Callie sees herself murder her own sister. It was published by Entangled: Teen in 2015 and hit the New York Times Young Adult E-Books Bestseller List at #4. The second book in the series is set ten years later and follows Jessa, Callie's sister, while she tries to prevent a massacre. It was published in 2016. A prequel to the series, Before Tomorrow, was also published in 2016. The third book in the series, Seize Today, was published in 2017.

=== Star-Crossed series ===
The first book in her second young adult series, Star-Crossed, was published in 2018 by Entangled: Teen. It's about a princess who lives on a planet where food is rare and who has to undergo a procedure that takes sixty years off her life but enables her colony to survive via nutrition pills, while her father, the king, is dying.

A sequel, Sky-Kissed, was set to follow in 2019.

=== Standalone novels ===
Dunn's first young adult thriller, The Darkest Lie, is about a teen who investigates her mother's death, who has died by suicide following the accusation that she slept with a high school quarterback. Her second thriller, Girl on the Verge, tells the story of a second-generation immigrant Thai-American teen whose family takes in a white girl who turns her life upside down It was published in 2017 by Kensington. Her third standalone novel, Malice, about a girl who finds out that a student in her school will create a virus that will kill millions in the future, was published by Entangled: Teen in 2020.

Her first rom-com, Dating Makes Perfect, about a Thai-American teen who starts dating against her family's wishes, was published in August 2020 and was favorably received by critics, earning a starred review from Kirkus Reviews. Dunn says she was inspired to write the novel after having conversations with other Asian and Thai-Americans whose families were adamant about them not dating only to change their mind later and ask them about relationships statuses and grandchildren.

== Awards ==
Awards for Pintip Dunn
Year	Nominated work	Category	Award	Result	Notes	Ref.
2016	Forget Tomorrow	Best First Book	Romance Writers of America RITA Award	Won		
2016	The Darkest Lie	Young Adult Contemporary	Romantic Times Reviewers' Choice Award	Finalist		
2017	Forget Tomorrow	Foreign YA Novel	Grand Prix de l'imaginaire	Finalist	translated by Diane Durocher (Lumen, 2017)	
2018	Seize Today	Young Adult Romance	Romance Writers of America RITA Award	Won		
