= Linda Goodnight =

American novelist

- Born: Oklahoma
- Occupation: Novelist
- Writing career
- Pen name: Linda Goodnight
- Period: 2000 - present
- Genres: inspirational romance, contemporary romance and women's fiction
- Notable awards: RITA award – Best Inspirational Romance; 2008 A Touch of Grace
- Website: www.lindagoodnight.com

Linda Goodnight is an American author of inspirational romance, contemporary romance and women's fiction. In 2008, she received the Romance Writers of America RITA Award for Best Inspirational Romance for her novel A Touch of Grace.

== Biography ==
Goodnight grew up in Prague, Oklahoma and was an avid reader, but didn't consider writing fiction a career until her former neighbor Sharon Sala began publishing romance novels. She started writing while raising a family and working full-time as a nurse. After working as a nurse for fourteen years, Goodnight became a teacher in a small rural school in 1985. In 1995, she was named "teacher of the year" by her colleagues. It was at this time that she decided to get serious about her writing and completed a novel. Twelve years later, she retired from teaching to write full-time.

She married her husband Gene when they were in their twenties, and he brought three children to the marriage. They went on to have three children of their own, and as they were set to retire, adopted from Ukraine in 2008 and 2009. She is also active in orphan ministry. They live outside Seminole, Oklahoma.

She cites Gone with the Wind as another inspiration as she kept rewriting the ending. "Clearly, I was meant to write books with happy endings...and so I do."

Her first published writing appeared in an anthology called Prairie Brides in 2000 for Barbour. She was picked up by Silhouette in 2002 for her novels. In 2015, she departed from romance to women's fiction with the publication of The Memory House.

== Awards and reception ==
- 2007 - Romantic Times Reviewers Choice Award for Steeple Hill Love Inspired for The Heart of Grace
- 2008 - Romance Writers of America RITA Award for Best Inspirational Romance for A Touch of Grace

She has also finaled four times in the RITA Award, won Booksellers' Best and ACFW Book of the Year.

Romantic Times Book Review gave A Touch of Grace 4.5 stars and a Top Pick, saying, "From its sad, touching beginning to an equally moving conclusion, [it] will keep you riveted."

Out of thirty-seven books reviewed on Romantic Times Book Review, thirty-one are 4 stars and above, but her only 2 star was for Cowboy Daddy, Jingle-Bell Baby which they said "The characters have excellent chemistry, but they're both stereotypes -- and the plot is crippled by multiple cliches."

RITA-nominated The Christmas Child received a B+ from guest reviewer Silver James on Smart Bitches Trashy Books, saying "a sweet romance with very real emotions and...funny secondary characters." However, for her RITA-nominated book, The Wedding Garden, a different reviewer at Smart Bitches gave it a DNF (did not finish): "I really wanted to like The Wedding Garden and Linda Goodnight is a solid writer, but I haven’t been able to finish the book...[T]here are too many frustrating wave-my-hands-in-the-air moments, mostly having to do with the secret baby plot line and the hero and heroine’s too-simplistic internal conflicts." Romantic Times, however, gave it 4 stars, calling it, "a tender tale of love lost and found, with a mystery solved and loved ones laid to rest."

On November 18, 2013, The Gift of Christmas hit #1 on Publishers Weekly's Mass Market bestsellers list, remaining on the list for at least nine weeks.

Romantic Times Book Review called The Memory House "...a tender story about love, loss, healing and redemption." Bookreporter's review stated that she "weaves a story of wounded souls who come into each other’s orbits to help each other heal." Jayne at Dear Author gave it a B− saying, "This is a story of painful emotions, loss, grief, love and redemption. It’s loaded with angst but it’s quiet, smoldering angst not in-your-face, slap you upside the head angst."

== Bibliography ==
=== The Brothers' Bond ===
1. A Season For Grace. Steeple Hill. December 2006. ISBN 9780373874118.
2. A Touch of Grace. Steeple Hill. March 2007. ISBN 9780373874262.
3. The Heart Of Grace. Steeple Hill. June 2007. ISBN 9780373874378.

=== The Buchanons ===
1. Cowboy Under the Mistletoe. Love Inspired. October 2014. ISBN 9780373879212.
2. The Christmas Family. Love Inspired. November 2015. ISBN 9780373818723.

=== A Honey Ridge Novel ===
1. The Memory House. HQN. March 2015. ISBN 9780373779642.

=== Redemption River ===
1. Finding Her Way Home. Steeple Hill. January 2010. ISBN 9780373875719.
2. The Wedding Garden. Steeple Hill. May 2010. ISBN 9780373875955.
3. A Place to Belong. Steeple Hill. February 2011. ISBN 9780373876556.
4. The Christmas Child. Love Inspired. September 2011. ISBN 9780373876976.
5. The Last Bridge Home. Love Inspired. January 2012. ISBN 9780373816019.

=== The Rocky Mountain Heirs ===
1. The Nanny's Homecoming. Love Inspired. June 2011. ISBN 9780373876808.

=== Whisper Falls ===
1. Rancher's Refuge. Love Inspired. December 2012. ISBN 9780373877874.
2. Baby in His Arms. Love Inspired. June 2013. ISBN 9780373878246.
3. Sugarplum Homecoming. Love Inspired. November 2013. ISBN 9780373878543.
4. The Lawman's Honor. Love Inspired. February 2014. ISBN 9780373878710.

=== Stand-alone works ===
- For Her Child. Silhouette. January 2002. ISBN 9780373195695.
- Married in a Month. Silhouette. August 2003. ISBN 9780373196821.
- Her Pregnant Agenda. Silhouette. October 2003.
- Saved By The Baby. Silhouette. February 2004. ISBN 9780373197095.
- Rich Man, Poor Bride. Silhouette. November 2004. ISBN 9780373197422.
- The Least Likely Groom. Silhouette. December 2004. ISBN 9780373197477.
- In The Spirit Of...Christmas. Steeple Hill. November 2005. ISBN 9780373873364.
- Sometimes When We Kiss. Silhouette. January 2006. ISBN 9780373198009.
- Prince Incognito. Silhouette. April 2006. ISBN 9780373198115.
- A Very Special Delivery. Steeple Hill. May 2006. ISBN 9780373873692.
- Married Under the Mistletoe. Harlequin. November 2006. ISBN 9780373039203.
- Missionary Daddy. Steeple Hill. August 2007. ISBN 9780373874446.
- Winning The Single Mom's Heart. Harlequin. July 2008. ISBN 9780373175253.
- A Time To Heal. Steeple Hill. September 2008. ISBN 9780373874972.
- The Millionaire's Nanny Arrangement. Harlequin. October 2008. ISBN 9780373175437.
- The Snow-Kissed Bride. Harlequin. January 2009. ISBN 9780373175611.
- Home To Crossroads Ranch. Steeple Hill. March 2009. ISBN 9780373875214.
- The Baby Bond. Steeple Hill. May 2009. ISBN 9780373875283.
- Jingle-Bell Baby. Mills and Boon. August 2009. ISBN 9780263208504.
- Cowboy Daddy, Jingle-Bell Baby. Harlequin. November 2009. ISBN 9780373176236.
- Her Prince's Secret Son. Harlequin. February 2010. ISBN 9780373176397.
- The Lawman's Christmas Wish. Steeple Hill. December 2010. ISBN 9780373876389.

=== Anthologies and short stories ===
- The Barefoot Bride. Barbour. March 2000. ISBN 9781577487128. in Prairie Brides
- Beauty for Ashes. Barbour. July 2000. ISBN 9781577487920. in Lessons of the Heart
- Troubled Waters. Barbour. May 2001. ISBN 9781586601348. in Love Afloat
- The Outlaw's Gift. Tyndale House. September 2004. ISBN 9780842381208. in Cowboy Christmas
- An English Bride Goes West. Barbour. September 2008. ISBN 9781602601192. in A Bride By Christmas
- Unforgettable. Harlequin. April 2009. ISBN 9780373786480. in Mothers and Daughters
- Yuletide Homecoming. Love Inspired. October 2012. ISBN 9780373877775. in A Snowglobe Christmas
- The Rambler's Bride. 2014. in First Kisses
