= Rachel Gibson (writer) =

American romance author

- Born: 1961 (age 64–65); United States
- Occupation: Novelist
- Children: 3
- Writing career
- Pen name: Rachel Gibson
- Period: 1998–present
- Genre: Romance
- Notable works: True Confessions, Not Another Bad Date
- Notable awards: RITA award – Contemporary Single Title; 2002 True Confessions; RITA award – Contemporary Single Title; 2009 Not Another Bad Date
- Website: www.rachelgibson.com

Rachel Gibson (born 1961) is an American author of contemporary romance novels. She is a two time winner of the Romance Writers of America RITA Award.

== Biography ==
With the publication of her first novel in 1998, Simply Irresistible, Gibson became a New York Times and USA Today bestselling author.

== Bibliography ==
=== Single novels ===
- Drop Dead Gorgeous (2022)
- How Lulu Lost Her mind (2020)
- Truly Madly Yours (1999)
- It Must Be Love (2000)
- True Confessions (2001)
- Lola Carlyle Reveals All (2002)
- Blue By You (2013)
- What I Love About You (2014)
- Just Kiss Me (2016)

=== Chinooks Hockey Team series ===
1. Simply Irresistible (1998)
2. See Jane Score (2003)
3. The Trouble with Valentine's Day (2005)
4. True Love and Other Disasters (2009)
5. Nothing But Trouble (2010)
6. Any Man of Mine (2011)
7. The Art of Running In Heels (2017)

=== Lovett, Texas ===
1. Daisy's Back in Town (2004)
2. Crazy On You (2012)
3. Rescue Me (2012)
4. Run To You (2013)
5. I Do! (2015)

=== Writers series ===
1. Sex, Lies, and Online Dating (2006)
2. I'm in No Mood for Love (2006)
3. Tangled Up In You (2007)
4. Not Another Bad Date (2008)

=== Anthologies in collaboration ===
- "I Do!" (2014)
- "Blue By You" (2013)
- "Now and Forever" in Secrets on a Perfect Night December 2000 (with Victoria Alexander and Stephanie Laurens)

== Awards and reception ==
- 2002 - Romance Writers of America RITA Award, Contemporary Single Title – True Confessions
- The Trouble With Valentine's Day: Borders Books Best Romantic Comedy 2006
- 2009 - Romance Writers of America RITA Award, Contemporary Single Title – Not Another Bad Date

She has also won The Golden Heart Award, the National Reader's Choice, Amazon Editor's Top Pick, Publisher Weekly's Quill nominee, and Borders bestselling romantic comedy for 2006.
