= Laura Drake =

American author of contemporary romance

- Laura Drake at the Romance Writers of America Literacy Signing, July 22, 2015, New York, NY
- Occupation: Novelist
- Writing career
- Period: 2013–present
- Genres: Romance, contemporary
- Notable work: The Sweet Spot
- Notable awards: RITA Award – Best First Book; 2014 The Sweet Spot
- Website: www.lauradrakebooks.com

Laura Drake is an American author of contemporary romance. In 2014, she won the Romance Writers of America's RITA Award for Best First Book for The Sweet Spot.

== Biography ==
Drake grew up in the suburbs outside Detroit, Michigan. She sold her Sweet on a Cowboy series, romances set in the world of professional bull riding, to Grand Central in January 2012. Before the first book in that series was published, she went on to sell a Harlequin SuperRomance in June 2012 and three more in March 2013. Her debut novel, The Sweet Spot, was released in the summer of 2013 and won a RITA for Best First Book.

Drake worked as a CFO until leaving to work full-time on her writing.

== Bibliography ==
=== Sweet on a Cowboy series ===
1. The Sweet Spot. Grand Central. May 2013. ISBN 9781455521951.
2. Nothing Sweeter. Grand Central. January 2014. ISBN 9781455521975.
3. Sweet on You. Grand Central. August 2014. ISBN 9781455521937.

=== Widow's Grove series ===
1. Her Road Home. Harlequin. August 2013. ISBN 9780373718702.
2. The Reasons to Stay. Harlequin. August 2014. ISBN 9780373608638.
3. Twice in a Blue Moon. Harlequin. July 2015. ISBN 9780373609185.

== Awards and commendation ==
- 2014 - Romance Writers of America RITA Award, Best First Book – The Sweet Spot
- Starred review in Library Journal, as well as Top Picks in RT Book Reviews
