= Kristan Higgins =

American novelist

- Education: College of the Holy Cross (BA)
- Occupation: Novelist
- Writing career
- Period: 2006–present
- Genres: Romance, contemporary
- Notable awards: RITA award – Best Contemporary Single Title; 2008 Catch of the Day; RITA award – Best Contemporary Single Title; 2010 Too Good Too Be True; RITA award – Best Mainstream Fiction; 2018 Now That You Mention It
- Website: www.kristanhiggins.com

Kristan Higgins is an American writer. She is a New York Times, USA Today, Wall Street Journal, and Publishers Weekly bestselling American author of humorous contemporary romance. She is a three-time winner of Romance Writers of America's RITA Award and a five-time nominee for the Kirkus Prize for Best Work of Fiction.

== Biography ==
Higgins is from Durham, Connecticut. Before writing, she worked in advertising and public relations. She lives with her firefighter husband and two children in Connecticut. She graduated from the College of the Holy Cross with a Bachelor of Arts in English literature.

== Bibliography ==
=== Blue Heron series ===
1. The Best Man. HQN. February 2013. ISBN 9780373777921.
2. The Perfect Match. HQN. October 2013. ISBN 9780373778195.
3. Waiting on You. HQN. March 2014. ISBN 9780373778584.
4. In Your Dreams. HQN. September 2014. ISBN 9780373779314.
5. Anything for You. HQN. December 2015. ISBN 9780373789085.

=== Gideon's Cove, Maine ===
1. Catch of the Day. HQN. October 2007. ISBN 9780373772247.
2. The Next Best Thing. HQN. January 2010. ISBN 9780373774388.
3. Somebody to Love. HQN. April 2012. ISBN 9780373776580.

=== Cambry-on-Hudson ===
1. If You Only Knew. HQN. August 2015. ISBN 9780373784974.
2. On Second Thought. HQN. January 2017. ISBN 9780373789252.
3. Good Luck with That. Berkley. August 2018. ISBN 978-0-451-48939-5.

=== Stand-alone novels ===
- Fools Rush In. HQN. November 2006. ISBN 9780373771097.
- Just One of the Guys. HQN. August 2008. ISBN 9780373772995.
- Too Good To Be True. HQN. February 2009. ISBN 9780373773558.
- All I Ever Wanted. HQN. August 2010. ISBN 9781426864087.
- My One and Only. HQN. March 2011. ISBN 9780373775576.
- Until There Was You. HQN. October 2011. ISBN 9780373776115.
- Now That You Mention It. HQN. December 2017. ISBN 9781525811364.
- Life and Other Inconveniences. Berkley Books. April 2020.
- Always the Last to Know. Berkley. 2020.
- Pack Up the Moon. Berkley. 2021. ISBN 978-0451489487.
- Out of the Clear Blue Sky. Berkley. 2022.
- A Little Ray of Sunshine. Berkley. 2023.

== Awards and reception ==
- 2008 - Romance Writers of America RITA Award for Best Contemporary Single Title Romance for Catch of the Day
- 2010 - Romance Writers of America RITA Award for Best Contemporary Single Title Romance for Too Good To Be True
- 2018 - Romance Writers of America RITA Award for Best Mainstream Fiction for Now That You Mention It

Her books have been translated into more than two dozen languages and received numerous starred reviews from Publishers Weekly, Booklist, Library Journal, Kirkus and Romantic Times. She is a five-time nominee for The Kirkus Prize for best work of fiction.

Romantic Times calls Higgins "the master of small-town romance".

Library Journal calls Higgins "the funniest author out there."

Publishers Weekly cited On Second Thought as being written with "uncommon grace and empathy".
