= Caroline Linden =

American novelist

- Occupation: Novelist
- Writing career
- Pen name: Caroline Linden
- Period: 2005–present
- Genres: historical romance, contemporary romance
- Notable awards: RITA award – Best Romance Novella; 2012 I Love the Earl
- Website: www.carolinelinden.com

Caroline Linden is an American author of historical and contemporary romance. She won Romance Writers of America RITA Award for Best Romance Novella in 2012 for I Love the Earl, making it the first digital-first publication to win this award. Her books have been translated into eleven foreign languages.

== Biography ==
Linden grew up the daughter of a member of United States Air Force. She earned her undergraduate degree in math from Harvard University and worked doing actuarial coding for a financial services firm. She met her husband in the math department of Harvard.

After a brief stint in Miami, she returned to Boston with her family, which created a break in her computer programming career. She decided to try fiction writing one night when she had nothing to read and a new iMac. After spending five years on three manuscripts, her agent sold What A Woman Needs. She likes writing books set in Regency England because it was "rich in intrigue and drama, with a major war, political upheaval, national scandals and spies, but it was also on the cusp of a new age of invention and scientific discovery. It was a good age for woman, historically speaking. It was also a beautiful age, with an emphasis on graceful architecture, landscaping and fashion—and that always makes a world more appealing."

She credits the original Star Wars trilogy as being a major influence, "The story-telling arc hits every button for me. It's got everything, from sword fights to romance to intrigue to secrets and sacrifice and a really hot pirate. Sorry, blockade runner. And the fate of the universe hangs on all these other storylines coming together. That moment at the end of Return of the Jedi, when Darth Vader is watching as the Emperor zaps Luke, and Luke cries out to him ... that pulls on everything from the series, that one pivotal scene that tips the plot into resolution." She tries to do the same for her books-- "make everything hang together and fit logically so that at the end, a reader can look back and say, 'Oh, now I see it all! Even that random little thing in Chapter Two turned out to play a part.'"

Linden resides near Boston with her husband and two children.

== Bibliography ==
=== The Bow St. Agents: Spies in Love ===
1. A View to a Kiss. February 2009
2. For Your Arms Only. December 2009
3. You Only Love Once. September 2010

=== The Reece Family ===
1. What a Gentleman Wants. September 2006
2. What a Rogue Desires. September 2007
3. A Rake's Guide to Seduction. June 2008

=== Scandals ===
- 1. Love and Other Scandals. August 2013
- 2. It Takes a Scandal. May 2014
- 2.5 All's Fair in Love and Scandal. April 2015
- 3. Love in the Time of Scandal. June 2015

=== The Truth About the Duke ===
1. I Love the Earl September 2011
2. One Night in London. September 2011
3. Blame It on Bath. March 2012
4. The Way to a Duke's Heart. September 2012

=== Stand-alone works ===
Historical romance

- What a Woman Needs August 2005
- Written in My Heart. November 2013

Contemporary romance

- Will You Be My Wi-Fi?. 2014

=== Short stories and anthologies ===
- "When I Met My Duchess". June 2013. In At The Duke's Wedding
- "Like None Other". August 2010

== Awards and reception ==
- 2011: The Daphne du Maurier Award for Best Historical Romantic Mystery/Suspense for You Only Love Once
- 2012: Romance Writers of America RITA Award for Best Romance Novella for I Love the Earl

Linden has finaled twice in the RITA, for A View to a Kiss and Will You Be My Wi-Fi?. She has also received starred reviews in Publishers Weekly and Booklist.

Awards
| Preceded by Virginia Kantra | Winner of the RITA Award for Best Romance Novella; 2012 | Succeeded by Eloisa James |
