= Nicole Burnham =

American novelist

- Born: Key West, Florida
- Education: Colorado State University (BA); University of Michigan (MA); University of Michigan Law School (JD)
- Occupation: Author
- Writing career
- Pen name: Niki Burnham
- Genres: Romance; young adult fiction
- Notable work: The Knight's Kiss
- Notable awards: RITA award – Short Contemporary Romance; 2004 The Knight's Kiss
- Website: nicoleburnham.com

Nicole Burnham is the author of several romance novels and books for teens. She writes romances under the name Nicole Burnham and young adult novels under the name Niki Burnham.

== Biography ==
Nicole Burnham is originally from Colorado, but was born in Key West, Florida, while her father was briefly stationed there with the military. She graduated from Mannheim American High School in 1988, then obtained her B.A. in political science magna cum laude in 1991 from Colorado State University, where she was Phi Beta Kappa. She earned both an M.A. in political science from the University of Michigan and a J.D. from the University of Michigan Law School in 1994. She clerked for a federal magistrate in Colorado and practiced law in St. Louis, Missouri before turning to writing full-time.

Burnham was a double finalist for the Romance Writers of America's Golden Heart in 2000. One of those two finalist manuscripts was Going to the Castle, which went on to become her first published novel the following year. She won the 2004 RITA in the Best Short Contemporary Series category for The Knight's Kiss, her third published novel. She was a RITA finalist again in 2005 for The Bowen Bride and in 2015 for Slow Tango With a Prince.

Burnham served on the board of directors of the Romance Writers of America for four years.

Burnham currently resides in Boston, Massachusetts. She is an avid baseball fan and maintains a blog called The Go-Ahead in which she discusses writing, health, and her favorite baseball teams, the Boston Red Sox and the Colorado Rockies. She appeared on Jeopardy! in July 2000, losing to eventual Jeopardy! Tournament of Champions runner-up Tad Carithers.

== List of works ==
=== Romance novels – Nicole Burnham ===
==== The Royal Scandals series ====
1. Christmas With a Prince (prequel novella) - November 2013
2. Scandal With a Prince - November 2013
3. Honeymoon With a Prince - December 2013
4. Christmas on the Royal Yacht (novella) - October 2014
5. Slow Tango With a Prince - June 2014
6. The Royal Bastard - June 2015
7. Christmas With a Palace Thief (novella) - October 2015
8. A Royal Scandals Wedding (novella) - August 2016
9. The Wicked Prince - August 2016
10. One Man's Princess - October 2017

These romances follow the Barrali royal family of the fictional island nation of Sarcaccia. The books are set in various locations around the world.

Three Royal Scandals Christmas novellas (Christmas With a Prince, Christmas on the Royal Yacht, and Christmas With a Palace Thief) were also released in a single collection titled A Royal Scandals Christmas.

==== The Royal Scandals: San Rimini series ====
1. The Hire (prequel novella) - February 2020
2. Fit for a Queen - February 2020
3. Going to the Castle - March 2020
4. The Prince's Tutor - April 2020
5. The Knight's Kiss - May 2020
6. Falling for Prince Federico - June 2020
7. To Kiss a King - July 2020

These romances follow the diTalora royal family of the fictional Mediterranean country of San Rimini.

Royal Scandals: San Rimini Books 2 - 5 (Going to the Castle, The Prince's Tutor, The Knight's Kiss, and Falling For Prince Federico) were originally released in a shorter format by Silhouette Books (2001-2004).

==== The Bowen, Nebraska series ====
- The Bowen Bride - November 2018

The Bowen Bride was originally released in a shorter format by Silhouette Books (2004).

==== Other romance fiction ====
- One Bachelor to Go (Silhouette Romance) - February 2004

=== Young adult novels – Niki Burnham ===
==== The Valerie Winslow series ====
1. Royally Jacked - Simon Pulse (UK title: Royally Crushed ) - 2004
2. Spin Control - Simon Pulse - 2005
3. Do-Over - Simon Pulse - 2006
4. Reality Check (short story) - 2006

This series of romantic comedies centers on high school sophomore Valerie Winslow, whose parents are getting a divorce. Her father is offered a job with the royal family in the fictional European country of Schwerinborg. Valerie opts to go along, where she ends up falling for the royal family's teenage son, Prince Georg.

==== Anthologies ====
- "Night Swimming" in Fireworks: Four Summer Stories with Erin Haft, Sarah Mlynowski, and Lauren Myracle (Scholastic Point) - April 2007
- "Last Stand" in Breaking Up (Is Hard To Do) with Terri Clark, Ellen Hopkins, and Lynda Sandoval (Houghton Mifflin Graphia) - May 2008

==== Other young adult fiction ====
- Sticky Fingers - Simon Pulse - 2005
- Scary Beautiful — Simon Pulse -2006
- Goddess Games — Simon & Schuster Books for Young Readers - 2007
- Shot Through the Heart - 2011

== Honors and awards ==
Awards for Nicole Burnham
Year	Nominated work	Category	Award	Result	Notes	Ref.
2004	The Knight's Kiss	Short Contemporary Romance	Romance Writers of America RITA Award	Won		
2005	The Bowen Bride	Traditional Series romance	Romance Writers of America RITA Award	Finalist		
2005	Royally Jacked		American Library Association Quick Picks for Reluctant Young Adult Readers	Listed		
2005	Royally Jacked		New York Public Library's Books for the Teen Age	Listed		
2015	Slow Tango With a Prince	Contemporary: Long romance	Romance Writers of America RITA Award	Finalist		

Royally Jacked was also a Teen People Pick.
