= Monette Cummings =

American writer

Monette A. Cummings
- Born: June 30, 1914; Kansas City, Missouri, United States
- Died: December 22, 1999 (aged 85); Lawrence, Kansas, United States
- Writing career
- Genre: Pulp magazine
- Subjects: Regency romance Planetary romance
- Notable work: The Beauty’s Daughter
- Notable awards: Golden Medallion – Regency Romance; 1986 The Beauty’s Daughter

Monette A. Cummings (1914 – 1999) was an American writer of pulp fiction of various genres including regency romance and planetary romance.

She was born in Kansas City, Missouri. Her work was collected in Exile and Other Tales of Fantasy, published in 1968.

Her novel The Beauty’s Daughter was awarded a Golden Medallion by the Romance Writers of America.

Cummings died in Lawrence, Kansas in 1999.

== Awards ==
- 1986 - Romance Writers of America Golden Medallion, Regency Romance – The Beauty’s Daughter
