= RITA Award =

Literary award for romance fiction

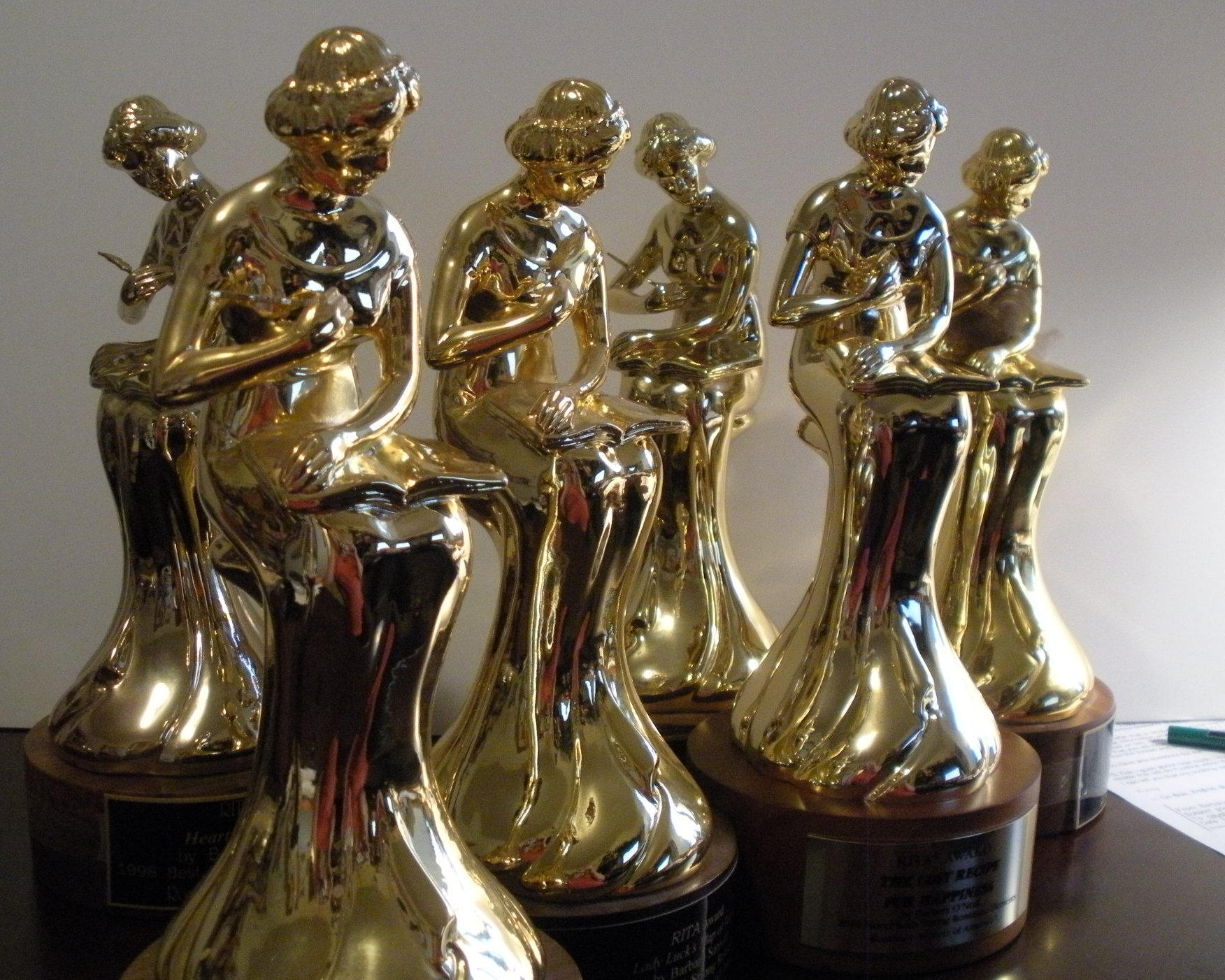
- Awarded for: Excellence in romantic fiction
- Country: United States
- Presented by: Romance Writers of America
- Website: http://www.rwa.org

The RITA Award (called the Golden Medallion from 1982 to 1989), presented by the Romance Writers of America (RWA) from 1982 to 2019, was an award for English-language romance fiction. It was named for the RWA's first president, Rita Clay Estrada. After not being awarded in 2020, it was replaced by the Vivian Award, which was awarded once in 2021.

== Procedure ==
The RITA Award opened for entries in the fall. Entrants had to supply five printed books by the posted deadline. Each title was judged by five judges during the preliminary round. Finalists were announced in mid-March and winners were announced at the annual award ceremony, held on the last day of the RWA's National Conference, normally in July. Winning authors received a gold statuette while book editors received a plaque.

== Controversies ==
In their final years, the RITA and Vivian awards were both at the center of various controversies because of objectionable content and a lack of diversity in the winning works.

=== 2015 For Such a Time controversy ===
In 2015, For Such a Time, written by Kate Breslin and published by Bethany House, was nominated for two RITA Awards in the Best Inspirational Romance and Best First Book categories. The nominations were criticized as antisemitic, because the book was set in Theresienstadt concentration camp during World War II and featured a Jewish prisoner being saved by an SS officer, falling in love with him and converting to Christianity.

=== 2018-2020 diversity controversy ===
The RITA Awards, like the English-language romance fiction industry as a whole, were overwhelmingly dominated by white authors. This caused controversy in 2018 when Alyssa Cole's An Extraordinary Union, a novel about interracial romance during the American Civil War, made no appearance among the RITA Awards finalists despite winning multiple other awards. Instead, all finalists were about white women, of whom all but one fell in love with British aristocrats. In response, the RWA board noted that less than half of 1% of finalists were by Black authors, none had ever won the award, and gave a commitment to improve the diversity of the award. The board issued an apology after the 2019 finalists again underrepresented persons of color or LGBTQ+ persons.

In 2019, Kennedy Ryan became the first Black woman to be awarded a RITA.

RWA cancelled the 2020 RITA Awards after several contestants and judges withdrew due to diversity concerns. A new award, the Vivian, named after Black RWA founder Vivian Stephens, was launched in late 2020.

=== 2021 Vivian Awards controversy ===
The inaugural Vivian Award in 2021 caused further controversy. The "Romance with Religious or Spiritual Elements" category winner At Love’s Command, written by Karen Witemeyer and published by Bethany House, faced criticism of anti-Indigenous racism. The book featured an American soldier as the male protagonist, who had taken part in massacres of Indigenous nations, including the Wounded Knee Massacre, and portrayed Indigenous religious practices as inferior to Christian ones. In response, Sara Whitney, the winner in the Best Mid-length Contemporary Romance category, announced that she would be returning her award in protest, because of "its narrow definition of inspirational romance and discussion of characters seeking redemption from 'crimes against humanity' prove the organization has not listened or learned from its current or former members."

The RWA initially defended the award, writing, "Romance with Religious or Spiritual Elements requires a redemptive arc as a genre convention." It said that no judges had submitted any concerns over the book, but that they would be creating a task force to assess "the overall effectiveness of the contest to include the contest process, rubric, and entry and judging guidelines." A day later, however, the RWA rescinded the award with the following statement: "We cannot in good conscience uphold the decision of the judges in voting to celebrate a book that depicts the inhumane treatment of indigenous people and romanticizes real world tragedies that still affect people to this day."

== RITA Award winners ==
| Year | Category | Sorting Category | Title | Author |
|---|---|---|---|---|
| 1990 | Best First Book | | Out of the Blue | Alaina Hawthorne |
| 1991 | Best First Book | | Black Horse Island | Dee Holmes |
| 1992 | Best First Book | | Candle in the Window | Christina Dodd |
| 1993 | Best First Book | | Trust Me | Jeane Renick |
| 1994 | Best First Book | | A Candle in the Dark | Megan Chance |
| 1995 | Best First Book | | Ghostly Enchantment | Angie Ray |
| 1996 | Best First Book | | The Warlord | Elizabeth Elliott |
| 1997 | Best First Book | | Stardust of Yesterday | Lynn Kurland |
| 1998 | Best First Book | | Brazen Angel | Elizabeth Boyle |
| 1999 | Best First Book | | My Darling Caroline | Adele Ashworth |
| 2000 | Best First Book | | The Maiden and The Unicorn | Isolde Martyn |
| 2001 | Best First Book | | A Man Like Mac | Fay Robinson |
| 2002 | Best First Book | | The Border Bride | Elizabeth English |
| 2003 | Best First Book | | Shades of Honor | Wendy Lindstrom |
| 2004 | Best First Book | | Back Roads | Susan Crandall |
| 2005 | Best First Book | | Time Off For Good Behavior | Lani Diane Rich |
| 2006 | Best First Book | | Show Her The Money | Stephanie Feagan |
| 2007 | Best First Book | | The Husband Trap | Tracy Anne Warren |
| 2008 | Best First Book | | Dead Girls Are Easy | Terri Garey |
| 2009 | Best First Book | | Oh. My. Gods. | Tera Lynn Childs |
| 2010 | Best First Book | | One Scream Away | Kate Brady |
| 2011 | Best First Book | | Pieces of Sky | Kaki Warner |
| 2012 | Best First Book | | First Grave on the Right | Darynda Jones |
| 2013 | Best First Book | | The Haunting of Maddy Clare | Simone St. James |
| 2014 | Best First Book | | The Sweet Spot | Laura Drake |
| 2015 | Best First Book | | Run to You | Clara Kensie |
| 2016 | Best First Book | | Forget Tomorrow | Pintip Dunn |
| 2017 | Best First Book | | Once and For All: An American Valor Novel | Cheryl Etchison |
| 2018 | Best First Book | | Take the Lead | Alexis Daria |
| 2019 | Best First Book | | Lady in Waiting | Marie Tremayne |
| 1982 | Category Contemporary Romance | Contemporary Romance | Winner Take All | Brooke Hastings |
| 1982 | Mainstream Contemporary Romance | Contemporary Romance | The Sun Dancers | Barbara Faith |
| 1983 | Contemporary Mainstream Romance | Contemporary Romance | Opal Fires | Lynda Trent |
| 1983 | Contemporary Sensual Romance | Contemporary Romance | The Heart’s Victory | Nora Roberts |
| 1983 | Contemporary Sweet Romance | Contemporary Romance | Renegade Player | Dixie Browning |
| 1984 | Contemporary Romance Under 65,000 words | Contemporary Romance | Memory and Desire | Eileen Bryan |
| 1984 | Contemporary Romance Over 80,000 Words | Contemporary Romance | This Magic Moment | Nora Roberts |
| 1984 | Contemporary Romance 65–80,000 words | Contemporary Romance | Destiny's Sweet Errand | Deirdre Mardon |
| 1984 | Traditional Romance | Contemporary Romance | Untamed | Nora Roberts |
| 1985 | Long Contemporary Series Romance | Contemporary Romance | A Matter of Choice | Nora Roberts |
| 1985 | Mainstream Romance | Contemporary Romance | After All These Years | Kathleen Gilles Seidel |
| 1985 | Short Contemporary Romance | Contemporary Romance | Opposites Attract | Nora Roberts |
| 1985 | Traditional Romance | Contemporary Romance | The Karas Cup | Brittany Young |
| 1986 | Long Contemporary Series Romance | Contemporary Romance | Today, Tomorrow and Always | Georgia Bockoven |
| 1986 | Short Contemporary Romance | Contemporary Romance | Much Needed Holiday | Joan Hohl |
| 1986 | Single Title Romance | Contemporary Romance | Banish Misfortune | Anne Stuart |
| 1986 | Traditional Romance | Contemporary Romance | The Crystal Unicorn | Doreen Malek |
| 1987 | Long Contemporary Series Romance | Contemporary Romance | One Summer | Nora Roberts |
| 1987 | Short Contemporary Romance | Contemporary Romance | Still Waters | Kathleen Creighton |
| 1987 | Single Title Romance | Contemporary Romance | Sunshine and Shadow | Tom and Sharon Curtis |
| 1987 | Traditional Romance | Contemporary Romance | Opal Fire | Sandy Dengler |
| 1988 | Long Contemporary Series Romance | Contemporary Romance | In the Defense of Love | Kathleen Creighton |
| 1988 | Short Contemporary Romance | Contemporary Romance | Stolen Moments | Terri Herrington |
| 1988 | Single Title Romance | Contemporary Romance | Twilight Whispers | Barbara Delinsky |
| 1988 | Traditional Romance | Contemporary Romance | It Takes a Thief | Rita Rainville |
| 1989 | Long Contemporary Series Romance | Contemporary Romance | A Crime of the Heart | Cheryl Reavis |
| 1989 | Short Contemporary Romance | Contemporary Romance | Winter’s Daughter | Kathleen Creighton |
| 1989 | Single Title Romance | Contemporary Romance | Leaves of Fortune | Linda Barlow |
| 1989 | Traditional Romance | Contemporary Romance | Flirtation River | Bethany Campbell |
| 1990 | Long Contemporary Series Romance | Contemporary Romance | The Ice Cream Man | Kathleen Korbel |
| 1990 | Short Contemporary Series Romance | Contemporary Romance | Night of the Hunter | Jennifer Greene |
| 1990 | Single Title Contemporary Romance | Contemporary Romance | Private Relations | Diane Chamberlain |
| 1990 | Traditional Romance | Contemporary Romance | Rhapsody in Bloom | Mona Van Wieren |
| 1991 | Long Contemporary Series Romance | Contemporary Romance | Patrick Gallagher’s Widow | Cheryl Reavis |
| 1991 | Short Contemporary Series Romance | Contemporary Romance | Step Into My Parlor | Jan Hudson |
| 1991 | Traditional Romance | Contemporary Romance | Song of the Lorelei | Lucy Gordon |
| 1992 | Long Contemporary Series Romance | Contemporary Romance | A Rose for Maggie | Kathleen Korbel |
| 1992 | Short Contemporary Series Romance | Contemporary Romance | A Human Touch | Glenda Sanders |
| 1992 | Single Title Contemporary Romance | Contemporary Romance | A Man to Die For | Eileen Dreyer |
| 1992 | Traditional Romance | Contemporary Romance | Every Kind of Heaven | Bethany Campbell |
| 1993 | Long Contemporary Series Romance | Contemporary Romance | The Silence of Midnight | Karen Young |
| 1993 | Short Contemporary Series Romance | Contemporary Romance | Navarrone | Helen R. Myers |
| 1993 | Single Title Contemporary Romance | Contemporary Romance | This Time Forever | Kathleen Eagle |
| 1993 | Traditional Romance | Contemporary Romance | Father Goose | Marie Ferrarella |
| 1994 | Long Contemporary Series Romance | Contemporary Romance | Dragonslayer | Emilie Richards |
| 1994 | Short Contemporary Series Romance | Contemporary Romance | Avenging Angel | Glenna McReynolds |
| 1994 | Contemporary Single Title | Contemporary Romance | Private Scandals | Nora Roberts |
| 1994 | Traditional Romance | Contemporary Romance | Annie and the Wise Men | Lindsay Longford |
| 1995 | Contemporary Single Title | Contemporary Romance | Again | Kathleen Gilles Seidel |
| 1995 | Long Contemporary Series Romance | Contemporary Romance | A Soldier’s Heart | Kathleen Korbel |
| 1995 | Short Contemporary Series Romance | Contemporary Romance | Getting Rid of Bradley | Jennifer Crusie |
| 1995 | Traditional Romance | Contemporary Romance | Oh Baby! | Lauryn Chandler |
| 1996 | Contemporary Single Title | Contemporary Romance | Born in Ice | Nora Roberts |
| 1996 | Long Contemporary Series Romance | Contemporary Romance | The Morning Side of Dawn | Justine Davis |
| 1996 | Short Contemporary Series Romance | Contemporary Romance | Single Dad | Jennifer Greene |
| 1996 | Traditional Romance | Contemporary Romance | Stranger in Her Arms | Elizabeth Sites |
| 1997 | Contemporary Single Title | Contemporary Romance | Daniel’s Gift | Barbara Freethy |
| 1997 | Long Contemporary Series Romance | Contemporary Romance | Wild Blood | Naomi Horton |
| 1997 | Short Contemporary Series Romance | Contemporary Romance | Cowboy Pride | Anne McAllister |
| 1997 | Traditional Romance | Contemporary Romance | Her Very Own Husband | Lauryn Chandler |
| 1998 | Contemporary Single Title | Contemporary Romance | Nobody's Baby But Mine | Susan Elizabeth Phillips |
| 1998 | Long Contemporary Series Romance | Contemporary Romance | Reckless | Ruth Wind |
| 1998 | Short Contemporary Series Romance | Contemporary Romance | Nobody's Princess | Jennifer Greene |
| 1998 | Traditional Romance | Contemporary Romance | His Brother's Child | Lucy Gordon |
| 1999 | Contemporary Single Title | Contemporary Romance | Dream A Little Dream | Susan Elizabeth Phillips |
| 1999 | Long Contemporary Romance | Contemporary Romance | Meant to Be Married | Ruth Wind |
| 1999 | Short Contemporary Romance | Contemporary Romance | The Notorious Groom | Caroline Cross |
| 1999 | Traditional Romance | Contemporary Romance | Monday Man | Kristin Gabriel |
| 2000 | Contemporary Single Title | Contemporary Romance | Body Guard | Suzanne Brockmann |
| 2000 | Long Contemporary Romance | Contemporary Romance | Undercover Princess | Suzanne Brockmann |
| 2000 | Short Contemporary Romance | Contemporary Romance | The Stardust Cowboy | Anne McAllister |
| 2000 | Traditional Romance | Contemporary Romance | Annie, Get Your Groom | Kristin Gabriel |
| 2001 | Contemporary Single Title | Contemporary Romance | First Lady | Susan Elizabeth Phillips |
| 2001 | Long Contemporary Romance | Contemporary Romance | Rogue's Reform | Marilyn Pappano |
| 2001 | Short Contemporary Romance | Contemporary Romance | It Takes A Rebel | Stephanie Bond |
| 2001 | Traditional Romance | Contemporary Romance | The Best Man & The Bridesmaid | Liz Fielding |
| 2002 | Contemporary Single Title | Contemporary Romance | True Confessions | Rachel Gibson |
| 2002 | Long Contemporary Romance | Contemporary Romance | Coming Home To You | Fay Robinson |
| 2002 | Short Contemporary Romance | Contemporary Romance | A Long Hot Christmas | Barbara Daly |
| 2002 | Traditional Romance | Contemporary Romance | Quinn's Complete Seduction | Sandra Steffen |
| 2003 | Contemporary Single Title | Contemporary Romance | No Place Like Home | Barbara Samuel |
| 2003 | Long Contemporary Romance | Contemporary Romance | Taking Cover | Catherine Mann |
| 2003 | Short Contemporary Romance | Contemporary Romance | Taming The Outlaw | Cindy Kay Gerard |
| 2003 | Traditional Romance | Contemporary Romance | The Christmas Basket | Debbie Macomber |
| 2004 | Contemporary Single Title | Contemporary Romance | Birthright | Nora Roberts |
| 2004 | Long Contemporary Romance | Contemporary Romance | The Top Gun's Return | Kathleen Creighton |
| 2004 | Short Contemporary Romance | Contemporary Romance | The Knight's Kiss | Nicole Burnham |
| 2004 | Traditional Romance | Contemporary Romance | Her Royal Baby | Marion Lennox |
| 2005 | Contemporary Single Title | Contemporary Romance | Bet Me | Jennifer Crusie |
| 2005 | Long Contemporary Romance | Contemporary Romance | John Riley's Girl | Inglath Cooper |
| 2005 | Short Contemporary Romance | Contemporary Romance | Miss Pruitt's Private Life | Barbara McCauley |
| 2005 | Traditional Romance | Contemporary Romance | Christmas Eve Marriage | Jessica Hart |
| 2006 | Contemporary Single Title | Contemporary Romance | Lakeside Cottage | Susan Wiggs |
| 2006 | Long Contemporary Romance | Contemporary Romance | Worth Every Risk | Dianna Love Snell |
| 2006 | Short Contemporary Romance | Contemporary Romance | The Marriage Miracle | Liz Fielding |
| 2006 | Traditional Romance | Contemporary Romance | Princess of Convenience | Marion Lennox |
| 2007 | Contemporary Single Title | Contemporary Romance | Adiós To My Old Life | Caridad Ferrer |
| 2007 | Long Contemporary Romance | Contemporary Romance | The Mommy Quest | Lori Handeland |
| 2007 | Short Contemporary Romance | Contemporary Romance | From the First | Jessica Bird |
| 2007 | Traditional Romance | Contemporary Romance | Claiming His Family | Barbara Hannay |
| 2008 | Contemporary Single Title Romance | Contemporary Romance | Catch of the Day | Kristan Higgins |
| 2008 | Contemporary Series Romance | Contemporary Romance | Snowbound | Janice Johnson |
| 2008 | Contemporary Series Romance: Suspense/Adventure | Contemporary Romance | Treasure | Helen Brenna |
| 2009 | Contemporary Single Title | Contemporary Romance | Not Another Bad Date | Rachel Gibson |
| 2009 | Contemporary Series Romance | Contemporary Romance | A Mother's Wish | Karen Templeton |
| 2009 | Contemporary Series Romance: Suspense/Adventure | Contemporary Romance | Danger Signals | Kathleen Creighton |
| 2010 | Contemporary Single Title Romance | Contemporary Romance | Too Good To Be True | Kristan Higgins |
| 2010 | Contemporary Series Romance | Contemporary Romance | A Not-So-Perfect Past | Beth Andrews |
| 2010 | Contemporary Series Romance: Suspense/Adventure | Contemporary Romance | The Soldier's Secret Daughter | Cindy Dees |
| 2011 | Contemporary Single Title Romance | Contemporary Romance | Simply Irresistible | Jill Shalvis |
| 2011 | Contemporary Series Romance | Contemporary Romance | Welcome Home, Cowboy | Karen Templeton |
| 2011 | Contemporary Series Romance: Suspense/Adventure | Contemporary Romance | The Moon That Night | Helen Brenna |
| 2012 | Contemporary Single Title Romance | Contemporary Romance | Boomerang Bride | Fiona Lowe |
| 2012 | Contemporary Series Romance | Contemporary Romance | Doukaki's Apprentice | Sarah Morgan |
| 2012 | Contemporary Series Romance: Suspense/Adventure | Contemporary Romance | Soldier's Last Stand | Cindy Dees |
| 2013 | Contemporary Single Title Romance | Contemporary Romance | The Way Back Home | Barbara Freethy |
| 2013 | Long Contemporary Series Romance | Contemporary Romance | A Gift For All Season | Karen Templeton |
| 2013 | Short Contemporary Series Romance | Contemporary Romance | A Night of No Return | Sarah Morgan |
| 2014 | Contemporary Romance | Contemporary Romance | Crazy Thing Called Love | Molly O'Keefe |
| 2014 | Short Contemporary Romance | Contemporary Romance | Why Resist a Rebel? | Leah Ashton |
| 2015 | Contemporary Romance: Long | Contemporary Romance | Baby, It's You | Jane Graves |
| 2015 | Contemporary Romance: Mid-Length | Contemporary Romance | One in a Million | Jill Shalvis |
| 2015 | Contemporary Romance: Short | Contemporary Romance | A Texas Rescue Christmas | Caro Carson |
| 2016 | Contemporary Romance: Long | Contemporary Romance | Brokedown Cowboy | Maisey Yates |
| 2016 | Contemporary Romance: Mid-Length | Contemporary Romance | Him | Sarina Bowen and Elle Kennedy (first self-published winner in this category) |
| 2016 | Contemporary Romance: Short | Contemporary Romance | The Nanny Plan | Sarah M. Anderson |
| 2017 | Contemporary Romance: Long | Contemporary Romance | Miracle on 5th Avenue | Sarah Morgan |
| 2017 | Contemporary Romance: Mid-Length | Contemporary Romance | Carolina Dreaming | Virginia Kantra |
| 2017 | Contemporary Romance: Short | Contemporary Romance | Christmas on Crimson Mountain | Michelle Major |
| 2018 | Contemporary Romance: Long | Contemporary Romance | Falling Hard | Lexi Ryan |
| 2018 | Contemporary Romance: Mid-Length | Contemporary Romance | Tell Me | Abigail Strom |
| 2018 | Contemporary Romance: Short | Contemporary Romance | Second Chance Summer | Kait Nolan |
| 2019 | Contemporary Romance: Long | Contemporary Romance | Long Shot | Kennedy Ryan |
| 2019 | Contemporary Romance: Mid-Length | Contemporary Romance | Advanced Physical Chemistry | Susannah Nix |
| 2019 | Contemporary Romance: Short | Contemporary Romance | The Bachelor’s Baby Surprise | Teri Wilson |
| 2014 | Erotic Romance | | Claim Me | J. Kenner |
| 2015 | Erotic Romance | | The Saint | Tiffany Reisz |
| 2016 | Erotic Romance | | For Real: A Spires Story | Alexis Hall |
| 2017 | Erotic Romance | | Off the Clock | Roni Loren |
| 2018 | Erotic Romance | | Wicked Dirty | J. Kenner |
| 2019 | Erotic Romance | | Three-Way Split | Elia Winters |
| 1982 | Mainstream Historical Romance | Historical Romance | Day Beyond Destiny | Anna James |
| 1982 | Category Historical Romance | Historical Romance | Rendezvous at Gramercy | Constance Ravenlock |
| 1983 | Mainstream Historical Romance | Historical Romance | The Endearment | LaVyrle Spencer |
| 1983 | Category Historical Romance | Historical Romance | Defiant Love | Mara Seger |
| 1984 | Historical Romance | Historical Romance | Hummingbird | LaVyrle Spencer |
| 1984 | Category Historical Romance | Historical Romance | The Clergyman’s Daughter | Julie Jeffries |
| 1985 | Regency Romance | Historical Romance | The Lurid Lady Lockport | Kasey Micheals |
| 1985 | Historical Romance | Historical Romance | Twice Loved | LaVyrle Spencer |
| 1986 | Regency Romance | Historical Romance | The Beauty’s Daughter | Monette Cummings |
| 1986 | Historical Romance | Historical Romance | Not So Wild a Dream | Francine Rivers |
| 1987 | Regency Romance | Historical Romance | Lord Abberley’s Nemesis | Amanda Scott |
| 1987 | Historical Romance | Historical Romance | By Right of Arms | Robyn Carr |
| 1988 | Regency Romance | Historical Romance | Sugar Rose | Susan Carroll |
| 1988 | Historical Romance | Historical Romance | The Gamble | LaVyrle Spencer |
| 1989 | Regency Romance | Historical Romance | Brighton Road | Susan Carroll |
| 1989 | Historical Romance | Historical Romance | Sunflower | Jill Marie Landis |
| 1990 | Series Historical Romance | Historical Romance | Silver Noose | Patricia Gardner |
| 1990 | Single Title Historical Romance | Historical Romance | The Bride | Julie Garwood |
| 1990 | Regency Romance | Historical Romance | The Rake and the Reformer | Mary Jo Putney |
| 1991 | Series Historical Romance | Historical Romance | A Wild Yearning | Penelope Williamson |
| 1991 | Single Title Historical Romance | Historical Romance | Where Love Dwells | Elizabeth Stuart |
| 1991 | Regency Romance | Historical Romance | The Sandalwood Princess | Loretta Chase |
| 1992 | Series Historical Romance | Historical Romance | The Tender Texan | Jodi Thomas |
| 1992 | Single Title Historical Romance | Historical Romance | Courting Miss Hattie | Pamela Morsi |
| 1992 | Regency Romance | Historical Romance | Emily and the Dark Angel | Jo Beverley |
| 1993 | Best Historical Series Romance | Historical Romance | The Prisoner | Cheryl Reavis |
| 1993 | Single Title Historical Romance | Historical Romance | Keeper of the Dream | Penelope Williamson |
| 1993 | Regency Romance | Historical Romance | An Unwilling Bride | Jo Beverley |
| 1994 | Historical Series Romance | Historical Romance | My Lady Notorious | Jo Beverley |
| 1994 | Historical Single Title Romance | Historical Romance | Untamed | Elizabeth Lowell |
| 1994 | Regency Romance | Historical Romance | Deidre and Don Juan | Jo Beverley |
| 1995 | Historical Romance | Historical Romance | To Tame a Texan’s Heart | Jodi Thomas |
| 1995 | Long Historical Romance | Historical Romance | Dancing on the Wind | Mary Jo Putney |
| 1995 | Regency Romance | Historical Romance | Mrs. Drew Plays Her Hand | Carla Kelly |
| 1996 | Long Historical Romance | Historical Romance | Something Shady | Pamela Morsi |
| 1996 | Short Historical Romance | Historical Romance | Lord of Scoundrels | Loretta Chase |
| 1996 | Regency Romance | Historical Romance | Gwen's Christmas Ghost | Lynn Kerstan and Alicia Rasley |
| 1997 | Long Historical Romance | Historical Romance | Conor's Way | Laura Lee Guhrke |
| 1997 | Short Historical Romance | Historical Romance | Always to Remember | Lorraine Heath |
| 1997 | Regency Romance | Historical Romance | The Lady's Companion | Carla Kelly |
| 1998 | Long Historical Romance | Historical Romance | Promise of Jenny Jones | Maggie Osborne |
| 1998 | Short Historical Romance | Historical Romance | Heart of a Knight | Barbara Samuel |
| 1998 | Regency Romance | Historical Romance | Love's Reward | Jean R. Ewing |
| 1999 | Long Historical Romance | Historical Romance | My Dearest Enemy | Connie Brockway |
| 1999 | Short Historical Romance | Historical Romance | Merely Married | Patricia Coughlin |
| 1999 | Regency Romance | Historical Romance | His Grace Endures | Emma Jenson |
| 2000 | Long Historical Romance | Historical Romance | Silken Threads | Patricia Ryan |
| 2000 | Short Historical Romance | Historical Romance | The Proposition | Judith Ivory |
| 2000 | Regency Romance | Historical Romance | The Rake's Retreat | Nancy Butler |
| 2001 | Long Historical Romance | Historical Romance | Devilish | Jo Beverley |
| 2001 | Short Historical Romance | Historical Romance | The Mistress | Susan Wiggs |
| 2001 | Regency Romance | Historical Romance | A Grand Design | Emma Jensen |
| 2002 | Long Historical Romance | Historical Romance | The Bridal Season | Connie Brockway |
| 2002 | Short Historical Romance | Historical Romance | Tempt Me Twice | Barbara Dawson Smith |
| 2002 | Regency Romance | Historical Romance | Much Obliged | Jessica Benson |
| 2003 | Long Historical Romance | Historical Romance | Stealing Heaven | Madeline Hunter |
| 2003 | Short Historical Romance | Historical Romance | The Bride Fair | Cheryl Reavis |
| 2003 | Regency Romance | Historical Romance | Debt to Delia | Barbara Metzger |
| 2004 | Long Historical Romance | Historical Romance | The Destiny | Kathleen Givens |
| 2004 | Short Historical Romance | Historical Romance | Worth Any Price | Lisa Kleypas |
| 2004 | Regency Romance | Historical Romance | Prospero's Daughter | Nancy Butler |
| 2005 | Long Historical Romance | Historical Romance | Shadowheart | Laura Kinsale |
| 2005 | Short Historical Romance | Historical Romance | A Wanted Man | Susan Kay Law |
| 2005 | Regency Romance | Historical Romance | A Passionate Endeavor | Sophia Nash |
| 2006 | Long Historical Romance | Historical Romance | The Devil to Pay | Liz Carlyle |
| 2006 | Short Historical Romance | Historical Romance | The Texan's Reward | Jodi Thomas |
| 2006 | Regency Romance | Historical Romance | A Reputable Rake | Diane Gaston |
| 2007 | Long Historical Romance | Historical Romance | On the Way to the Wedding | Julia Quinn |
| 2007 | Short Historical Romance | Historical Romance | The Book of True Desires | Betina Krahn |
| 2008 | Historical Romance | Historical Romance | Lessons of Desire | Madeline Hunter |
| 2008 | Regency Historical Romance | Historical Romance | The Secret Diaries of Miss Miranda Cheever | Julia Quinn |
| 2009 | Historical Romance | Historical Romance | The Edge of Impropriety | Pam Rosenthal |
| 2009 | Regency Historical Romance | Historical Romance | My Lord and Spymaster | Joanna Bourne |
| 2010 | Historical Romance | Historical Romance | Not Quite a Husband | Sherry Thomas |
| 2010 | Regency Historical Romance | Historical Romance | What Happens in London | Julia Quinn |
| 2011 | Historical Romance | Historical Romance | His at Night | Sherry Thomas |
| 2011 | Regency Historical Romance | Historical Romance | The Mischief of the Mistletoe | Lauren Willig |
| 2012 | Historical Romance | Historical Romance | The Black Hawk | Joanna Bourne |
| 2012 | Regency Historical Romance | Historical Romance | A Night to Surrender | Tessa Dare |
| 2013 | Historical Romance | Historical Romance | A Rogue by Any Other Name | Sarah MacLean |
| 2014 | Historical Romance | Historical Romance | No Good Duke Goes Unpunished | Sarah MacLean |
| 2015 | Historical Romance: Long | Historical Romance | Fool Me Twice | Meredith Duran |
| 2015 | Historical Romance: Short | Historical Romance | Romancing the Duke | Tessa Dare |
| 2016 | Historical Romance: Long | Historical Romance | Tiffany Girl | Deeanne Gist |
| 2016 | Historical Romance: Short | Historical Romance | It Started with a Scandal | Julie Anne Long |
| 2017 | Historical Romance: Long | Historical Romance | No Mistress of Mine | Laura Lee Guhrke |
| 2017 | Historical Romance: Short | Historical Romance | A Duke to Remember | Kelly Bowen |
| 2018 | Historical Romance: Long | Historical Romance | Between the Devil and the Duke | Kelly Bowen |
| 2018 | Historical Romance: Short | Historical Romance | Waltzing with the Earl | Catherine Tinley |
| 2019 | Historical Romance: Long | Historical Romance | A Wicked Kind of Husband | Mia Vincy |
| 2019 | Historical Romance: Short | Historical Romance | A Duke in the Night | Kelly Bowen |
| 2004 | Novel with Strong Romantic Elements | Mainstream Fiction with a Central Romance | Between Sisters | Kristin Hannah |
| 2005 | Novel with Strong Romantic Elements | Mainstream Fiction with a Central Romance | A.K.A. Goddess | Evelyn Vaughn |
| 2006 | Novel with Strong Romantic Elements | Mainstream Fiction with a Central Romance | Lady Luck's Map of Vegas | Barbara Samuel |
| 2007 | Novel with Strong Romantic Elements | Mainstream Fiction with a Central Romance | A Lady Raised High | Jennifer Ashley w/a Laurien Gardner |
| 2008 | Novel with Strong Romantic Elements | Mainstream Fiction with a Central Romance | Silent in the Grave | Deanna Raybourn |
| 2009 | Novel with Strong Romantic Elements | Mainstream Fiction with a Central Romance | Tribute | Nora Roberts |
| 2010 | Novel with Strong Romantic Elements | Mainstream Fiction with a Central Romance | The Lost Recipe for Happiness | Barbara O'Neal |
| 2011 | Novel with Strong Romantic Elements | Mainstream Fiction with a Central Romance | Welcome to Harmony | Jodi Thomas |
| 2012 | Novel with Strong Romantic Elements | Mainstream Fiction with a Central Romance | How to Bake a Perfect Life | Barbara O'Neal |
| 2013 | Novel with Strong Romantic Elements | Mainstream Fiction with a Central Romance | The Haunting of Maddy Clare | Simone St. James |
| 2017 | Mainstream Fiction with a Central Romance | Mainstream Fiction with a Central Romance | The Moon in the Palace | Weina Dai Randel |
| 2018 | Mainstream Fiction with a Central Romance | Mainstream Fiction with a Central Romance | Now that You Mention It | Kristan Higgins |
| 2019 | Mainstream Fiction with a Central Romance | Mainstream Fiction with a Central Romance | How to Keep a Secret | Sarah Morgan |
| 1992 | Futuristic/Fantasy/Paranormal Romance | Paranormal Romance | Angel for Hire | Justine Davis |
| 1993 | Futuristic/Fantasy/Paranormal Romance | Paranormal Romance | Emily’s Ghost | Antoinette Stokenberg |
| 1994 | Futuristic/Fantasy/Paranormal Romance | Paranormal Romance | Falling Angel | Anne Stuart |
| 1995 | Paranormal Romance | Paranormal Romance | Lord of the Storm | Justine Davis |
| 1996 | Paranormal Romance | Paranormal Romance | The Covenant | Modean Moon |
| 1997 | Paranormal Romance | Paranormal Romance | Stardust of Yesterday | Lynn Kurland |
| 1998 | Paranormal Romance | Paranormal Romance | FireHawk | Justine Dare |
| 1999 | Paranormal Romance | Paranormal Romance | The Bride Finder | Susan Carroll |
| 2000 | Paranormal Romance | Paranormal Romance | Nell | Jeanette Baker |
| 2001 | Paranormal Romance | Paranormal Romance | The Highlander's Touch | Karen Marie Moning |
| 2002 | Paranormal Romance | Paranormal Romance | Heart Mate | Robin D. Owens |
| 2003 | Paranormal Romance | Paranormal Romance | Contact | Susan Grant |
| 2004 | Paranormal Romance | Paranormal Romance | Shades of Midnight | Linda Fallon |
| 2005 | Paranormal Romance | Paranormal Romance | Blue Moon | Lori Handeland |
| 2006 | Paranormal Romance | Paranormal Romance | Gabriel's Ghost | Linnea Sinclair |
| 2007 | Paranormal Romance | Paranormal Romance | A Hunger Like No Other | Kresley Cole |
| 2008 | Paranormal Romance | Paranormal Romance | Lover Revealed | J.R. Ward |
| 2009 | Paranormal Romance | Paranormal Romance | Seducing Mr. Darcy | Gwyn Cready |
| 2010 | Paranormal Romance | Paranormal Romance | Kiss of a Demon King | Kresley Cole |
| 2011 | Paranormal Romance | Paranormal Romance | Unchained: The Dark Forgotten | Sharon Ashwood |
| 2012 | Paranormal Romance | Paranormal Romance | Dragon Bound | Thea Harrison |
| 2013 | Paranormal Romance | Paranormal Romance | Shadow's Claim | Kresley Cole |
| 2014 | Paranormal Romance | Paranormal Romance | The Firebird | Susanna Kearsley |
| 2015 | Paranormal Romance | Paranormal Romance | Evernight | Kristen Callihan |
| 2016 | Paranormal Romance | Paranormal Romance | Must Love Chainmail | Angela Quarles (first self-published winner in this category) |
| 2017 | Paranormal Romance | Paranormal Romance | The Pages of the Mind | Jeffe Kennedy |
| 2018 | Paranormal Romance | Paranormal Romance | Hunt the Darkness | Stephanie Rowe |
| 2019 | Paranormal Romance | Paranormal Romance | Dearest Ivie | J.R. Ward |
| 2000 | Romantic Novella | | Starry, Starry Night | Marianne Willman |
| 2001 | Romance Novella | | Final Approach to Forever from Once Upon A Dream | Merline Lovelace |
| 2002 | Romance Novella | | I Will from Wish List | Lisa Kleypas |
| 2003 | Romance Novella | | To Kiss in Shadows | Lynn Kurland |
| 2004 | Romance Novella | | Prisoner of the Tower in The Wedding Chase | Gayle Wilson |
| 2005 | Romance Novella | | Her Enemy in Night's Edge | Maggie Shayne |
| 2006 | Romance Novella | | The Naked Truth about Guys in The Naked Truth | Alesia Holliday |
| 2007 | Romance Novella | | Tis the Silly Season in A NASCAR Holiday | Roxanne St. Claire |
| 2008 | Romance Novella | | Born in My Heart in Like Mother, Like Daughter | Jennifer Greene |
| 2009 | Romance Novella | | The Fall of Rogue Gerard in It Happened One Night | Stephanie Laurens |
| 2010 | Romance Novella | | The Christmas Eve Promise in The Night Before Christmas | Molly O'Keefe |
| 2011 | Romance Novella | | Shifting Sea in Burning Up | Virginia Kantra |
| 2012 | Romance Novella | | I Love the Earl | Caroline Linden |
| 2013 | Romance Novella | | Seduced by a Pirate | Eloisa James |
| 2014 | Romance Novella | | Take Me, Cowboy | Jane Porter |
| 2015 | Romance Novella | | His Road Home | Anna Richland |
| 2016 | Romance Novella | | Nice Girls Don't Ride | Roni Loren |
| 2017 | Romance Novella | | Her Every Wish | Courtney Milan |
| 2018 | Romance Novella | | Forbidden River | Brynn Kelly |
| 2019 | Romance Novella | | Bad Blood | M. Malone |
| 1985 | Inspirational Romance | Romance with Religious or Spiritual Elements | For the Love of Mike | Charlotte Nichols |
| 1986 | Inspirational Romance | Romance with Religious or Spiritual Elements | From This Day Forward | Kathleen Karr |
| 1995 | Inspirational Romance | Romance with Religious or Spiritual Elements | An Echo in the Darkness | Francine Rivers |
| 1996 | Inspirational Romance | Romance with Religious or Spiritual Elements | As Sure as the Dawn | Francine Rivers |
| 1997 | Inspirational Romance | Romance with Religious or Spiritual Elements | The Scarlet Thread | Francine Rivers |
| 1998 | Inspirational Romance | Romance with Religious or Spiritual Elements | Homeward | Melody Carlson |
| 1999 | Inspirational Romance | Romance with Religious or Spiritual Elements | Patterns of Love | Robin Lee Hatcher |
| 2000 | Inspirational Romance | Romance with Religious or Spiritual Elements | Danger in the Shadows | Dee Henderson |
| 2001 | Inspirational Romance | Romance with Religious or Spiritual Elements | The Shepherd's Voice | Robin Lee Hatcher |
| 2002 | Inspirational Romance | Romance with Religious or Spiritual Elements | Beneath a Southern Sky | Deborah Raney |
| 2003 | Inspirational Romance | Romance with Religious or Spiritual Elements | Never Say Goodbye | Irene Hannon |
| 2004 | Inspirational Romance | Romance with Religious or Spiritual Elements | Autumn Dreams | Gayle Roper |
| 2005 | Inspirational Romance | Romance with Religious or Spiritual Elements | Grounds To Believe | Shelley Bates |
| 2006 | Inspirational Romance | Romance with Religious or Spiritual Elements | Heavens To Betsy | Beth Pattillo |
| 2007 | Inspirational Romance | Romance with Religious or Spiritual Elements | Revealed | Tamera Alexander |
| 2008 | Inspirational Romance | Romance with Religious or Spiritual Elements | A Touch of Grace | Linda Goodnight |
| 2009 | Inspirational Romance | Romance with Religious or Spiritual Elements | Finding Stefanie | Susan May Warren |
| 2010 | Inspirational Romance | Romance with Religious or Spiritual Elements | The Inheritance | Tamera Alexander |
| 2011 | Inspirational Romance | Romance with Religious or Spiritual Elements | In Harm's Way | Irene Hannon |
| 2012 | Inspirational Romance | Romance with Religious or Spiritual Elements | The Measure of Katie Calloway | Serena B. Miller |
| 2013 | Inspirational Romance | Romance with Religious or Spiritual Elements | Against the Tide | Elizabeth Camden |
| 2014 | Inspirational Romance | Romance with Religious or Spiritual Elements | Five Days in Skye | Carla Laureano |
| 2015 | Inspirational Romance | Romance with Religious or Spiritual Elements | Deceived | Irene Hannon |
| 2016 | Inspirational Romance | Romance with Religious or Spiritual Elements | A Noble Masquerade | Kristi Ann Hunter |
| 2017 | Romance with Religious or Spiritual Elements | Romance with Religious or Spiritual Elements | My Hope Next Door | Tammy L. Gray |
| 2018 | Romance with Religious or Spiritual Elements | Romance with Religious or Spiritual Elements | Then There Was You | Kara Isaac |
| 2019 | Romance with Religious or Spiritual Elements | Romance with Religious or Spiritual Elements | The Saturday Night Supper Club | Carla Laureano |
| 1989 | Romantic Suspense | | Brazen Virtue | Nora Roberts |
| 1990 | Romantic Suspense | | Perchance to Dream | Kathleen Korbel |
| 1991 | Romantic Suspense | | Night Spice | Karen Keast |
| 1992 | Romantic Suspense | | Night Shift | Nora Roberts |
| 1993 | Romantic Suspense | | Divine Evil | Nora Roberts |
| 1994 | Romantic Suspense | | Nightshade | Nora Roberts |
| 1995 | Romantic Suspense | | Hidden Riches | Nora Roberts |
| 1996 | Romantic Suspense | | Winter’s Edge | Anne Stuart |
| 1997 | Romantic Suspense | | See How They Run | Bethany Campbell |
| 1998 | Romantic Suspense | | On the Way to a Wedding | Ingrid Weave |
| 1999 | Romantic Suspense | | Cool Shade | Theresa Weir |
| 2000 | Romantic Suspense | | The Bride's Protector | Gayle Wilson |
| 2001 | Romantic Suspense | | Carolina Moon | Nora Roberts |
| 2002 | Romantic Suspense | | The Surgeon | Tess Gerritsen |
| 2003 | Romantic Suspense | | Three Fates | Nora Roberts |
| 2004 | Romantic Suspense | | Remember When - Part 1 | Nora Roberts |
| 2005 | Romantic Suspense | | I'm Watching You | Karen Rose |
| 2006 | Romantic Suspense | | Survivor in Death | J.D. Robb |
| 2007 | Romantic Suspense | | Blackout | Annie Solomon |
| 2008 | Romantic Suspense | | Ice Blue | Anne Stuart |
| 2009 | Romantic Suspense | | Take No Prisoners | Cindy Gerard |
| 2010 | Romantic Suspense | | Whisper of Warning | Laura Griffin |
| 2011 | Romantic Suspense | | Silent Scream | Karen Rose |
| 2012 | Romantic Suspense | | New York to Dallas | J.D. Robb |
| 2013 | Romantic Suspense | | Scorched | Laura Griffin |
| 2014 | Romantic Suspense | | Off the Edge | Carolyn Crane (first self-published winner) |
| 2015 | Romantic Suspense | | Concealed in Death | J.D. Robb |
| 2016 | Romantic Suspense | | Flash Fire | Dana Marton |
| 2017 | Romantic Suspense | | Repressed | Elisabeth Naughton |
| 2018 | Romantic Suspense | | The Fixer | HelenKay Dimon |
| 2019 | Romantic Suspense | | Fearless | Elizabeth Dyer |
| 1983 | Young Adult Romance | | Andrea | Jo Stewart |
| 1984 | Young Adult Romance | | Julie’s Magic Moment | Barbara Bartholomew |
| 1985 | Young Adult Romance | | The Frog Princess | Cheryl Zach |
| 1986 | Young Adult Romance | | Waiting for Amanda | Cheryl Zach |
| 1987 | Young Adult Romance | | Video Fever | Kathleen Garvey |
| 1988 | Young Adult Romance | | Does Your Nose Get in the Way, Too? | Arlene Erlbach |
| 1989 | Young Adult Romance | | The Ghosts of Stony Cove | Eileen Charbonneau |
| 1990 | Young Adult Romance | | Renee | Vivan Schurfranz |
| 1992 | Young Adult Romance | | Now I Lay Me Down to Sleep | Lurlene McDaniel |
| 1993 | Young Adult Romance | | Song of the Buffalo Boy | Sherry Garland |
| 1994 | Young Adult Romance | | Summer Lightning | Wendy Corsi Staub |
| 1995 | Young Adult Romance | | Second to None | Arleynn Presser |
| 1996 | Young Adult Romance | | Runaway | Cheryl Zach |
| 2008 | Young Adult Romance | | Wicked Lovely | Melissa Marr |
| 2009 | Young Adult Romance | | Hell Week | Rosemary Clement-Moore |
| 2010 | Young Adult Romance | | Perfect Chemistry | Simone Elkeles |
| 2011 | Young Adult Romance | | The Iron King | Julie Kagawa |
| 2012 | Young Adult Romance | | Enclave | Ann Aguirre |
| 2013 | Young Adult Romance | | The Farm | Emily McKay |
| 2015 | Young Adult Romance | | Boys Like You | Juliana Stone |
| 2016 | Young Adult Romance | | The Anatomical Shape of a Heart | Jenn Bennett |
| 2017 | Young Adult Romance | | The Problem with Forever | Jennifer L. Armentrout |
| 2018 | Young Adult Romance | | Seize Today | Pintip Dunn |
| 2019 | Young Adult Romance | | My So-Called Bollywood Life | Nisha Sharma |
| 1990 | Best Romance of 1989 | Best Romance | Morning Glory | LaVyrle Spencer |
| 1991 | Best Romance of 1990 | Best Romance | The Prince of Midnight | Laura Kinsale |
| 1992 | Best Romance of 1991 | Best Romance | Outlander | Diana Gabaldon |
| 1993 | Best Romance of 1992 | Best Romance | Come Spring | Jill Marie Landis |
| 1994 | Best Romance of 1993 | Best Romance | Lord of the Night | Susan Wiggs |
| 1995 | Best Romance of 1994 | Best Romance | It Had To Be You | Susan Elizabeth Phillips |
| 1996 | Best Romance of 1995 | Best Romance | Born in Ice | Nora Roberts |
| 1998 | RWA's Favorite Book of 1997 | Best Romance | Nobody's Baby But Mine | Susan Elizabeth Phillips |

== Vivian Award winners ==
=== Best First Book ===
- 2021: Love Me Like a Love Song by Annmarie Boyle

=== Contemporary Romance ===
- 2021
  - Long Contemporary Romance: False Start by Jessica Ruddick
  - Mid-Length Contemporary Romance: Tempting Taste by Sara Whitney
  - Short Contemporary Romance: Engaging the Enemy by Reese Ryan

=== Erotic Romance ===
- 2021: Pure Satisfaction by Rebecca Hunter

=== Historical Romance ===
- 2021
  - Long Historical Romance: Ten Things I Hate About the Duke by Loretta Chase
  - Mid-Length Historical Romance: A Study in Passion by Louisa Cornell

=== Mainstream Fiction with a Central Romance ===
- 2021: An Everyday Hero by Laura Trentham

=== Most Anticipated Romance ===
- 2021: Burning Caine by Janet Oppedisano

=== Romance with Religious or Spiritual Elements ===
- 2021: At Love's Command by Karen Witemeyer. The award was rescinded (see above).

=== Romantic Suspense ===
- 2021
  - Long Romantic Suspense: Hail Mary by Hope Anika
  - Mid-Length Romantic Suspense: Storm by Janie Crouch

=== Speculative Romance ===
- 2021
  - Long Speculative Romance: A Stitch in Time by Kelley Armstrong
  - Mid-Length Speculative Romance: Betwixt by Darynda Jones
