= Elizabeth Elliott (romance author) =

American writer

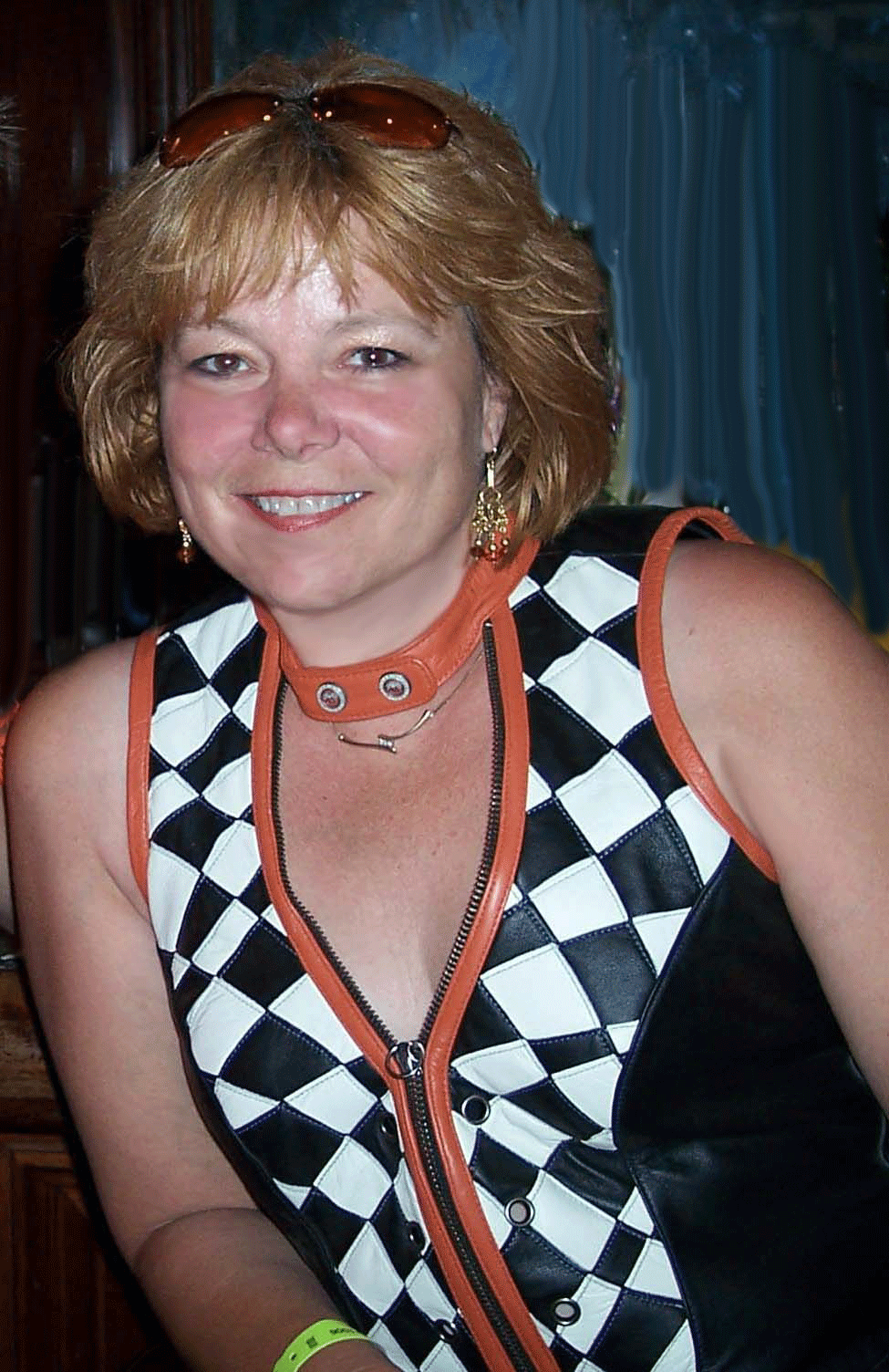
- Born: Linda Kay Elliott; Fort Worth, Texas, United States
- Occupation: Novelist
- Spouse: William Crippes
- Writing career
- Pen name: Elizabeth Elliott
- Period: 1995 – present
- Genre: Romance
- Notable work: The Warlord
- Notable awards: RITA award – Best First Book; 1996 The Warlord
- Website: www.elizabeth-elliott.com

Elizabeth Elliott (born in Fort Worth, Texas as Linda Elliott) is the pseudonym for American romance novel author Linda Crippes. All of her novels are published by Bantam Books, now owned by Random House. In addition to writing, she has held various management positions with Fortune 500 companies and worked as a management consultant for a variety of smaller businesses, specializing in information technology. She lives in Minnesota with her husband. She is a recipient of the RITA Award.

== Awards ==
- 1993 – Romance Writers of America Golden Heart Award
- 1996 – RITA Award in the category of Best First Book for The Warlord

== Bibliography ==
- The Warlord (1995)
- Scoundrel (1996)
- Betrothed (1996)
- When You Wish (1997) (anthology)
- "The Dark Knight" (2012)
