= Pamela Morsi =

American writer (1951–2024)

- Born: March 12, 1951; Muskogee, Oklahoma, U.S.
- Died: December 14, 2024 (aged 73); San Antonio, Texas, U.S.
- Education: Oklahoma State University (BA); University of Missouri
- Occupation: Novelist
- Writing career
- Period: 1991–2024
- Genre: Romance novel
- Website: www.pamelamorsi.com

Pamela Morsi (March 12, 1951 – December 14, 2024) was an American writer. She was the author of 29 romance novels, beginning in 1991.

== Biography ==
Morsi was a USA Today Bestselling Author and wrote 29 novels. She was a two-time recipient of the RITA Award for her novels Courting Miss Hattie (Single Title Historical Romance - 1992) and Something Shady (Long Historical Romance - 1996). She was a librarian, with a master's degree from University of Missouri and a BA from Oklahoma State University. Morsi was known for writing primarily fiction and romance novels that feature stories of humor and insight as she portrays the lives of ordinary people in everyday situations. At the time of her death, she was living with her husband and daughter in San Antonio, Texas.

== Book to film adaptation ==
Morsi helped in her community on issues regarding accessible transportation and foster parenting for the disabled. She also helped organize the regional games for Special Olympics. Her interest in people with special needs is also shown through characters in her books, notably the mentally-disabled lead character of "Jelly" in her 2010 novel The Bikini Car Wash. The Bikini Car Wash has been optioned for development as In-Plainview (www.In-Plainview.com), a cable network series and feature film spin-off by actor/producer Bryan Kent in Los Angeles.

== Bibliography ==
=== Stand alone novels ===
- Mr. Right Goes Wrong (July 2014)
- Love Overdue (August 2013)
- The Lovesick Cure (September 2012)
- The Bentleys Buy a Buick (September 2011)
- The Bikini Car Wash (July 2010)
- The Social Climber of Davenport Heights (April 2010)
- Red's Hot Honky-Tonk Bar (July 2009)
- Last Dance at Jitterbug Lounge (May 2008)
- Bitsy's Bait & BBQ (February 2007)
- The Night We Met (November 2006)
- The Cotton Queen (February 2006)
- By Summer's End (February 2005)
- Suburban Renewal (February 2004)
- Letting Go (March 2003)
- Doing Good (March 2002)
- Here Comes the Bride (July 2000)
- Sweetwood Bride (August 1999)
- Sealed with a Kiss (May 1998)
- No Ordinary Princess (June 1997)
- The Love Charm (November 1996)
- Simple Jess (April 1996)
- Something Shady (July 1995)
- Marrying Stone (August 1994)
- Runabout (February 1994)
- Wild Oats (September 1993)
- Garters (August 1992)
- Courting Miss Hattie (October 1991)
- Heaven Sent (January 1991)

=== Non-fiction ===
- "A Working Class Romance" essay in North American Romance Writers (1999, ISBN 0810836041)
