= Sarah Morgan (writer) =

British author

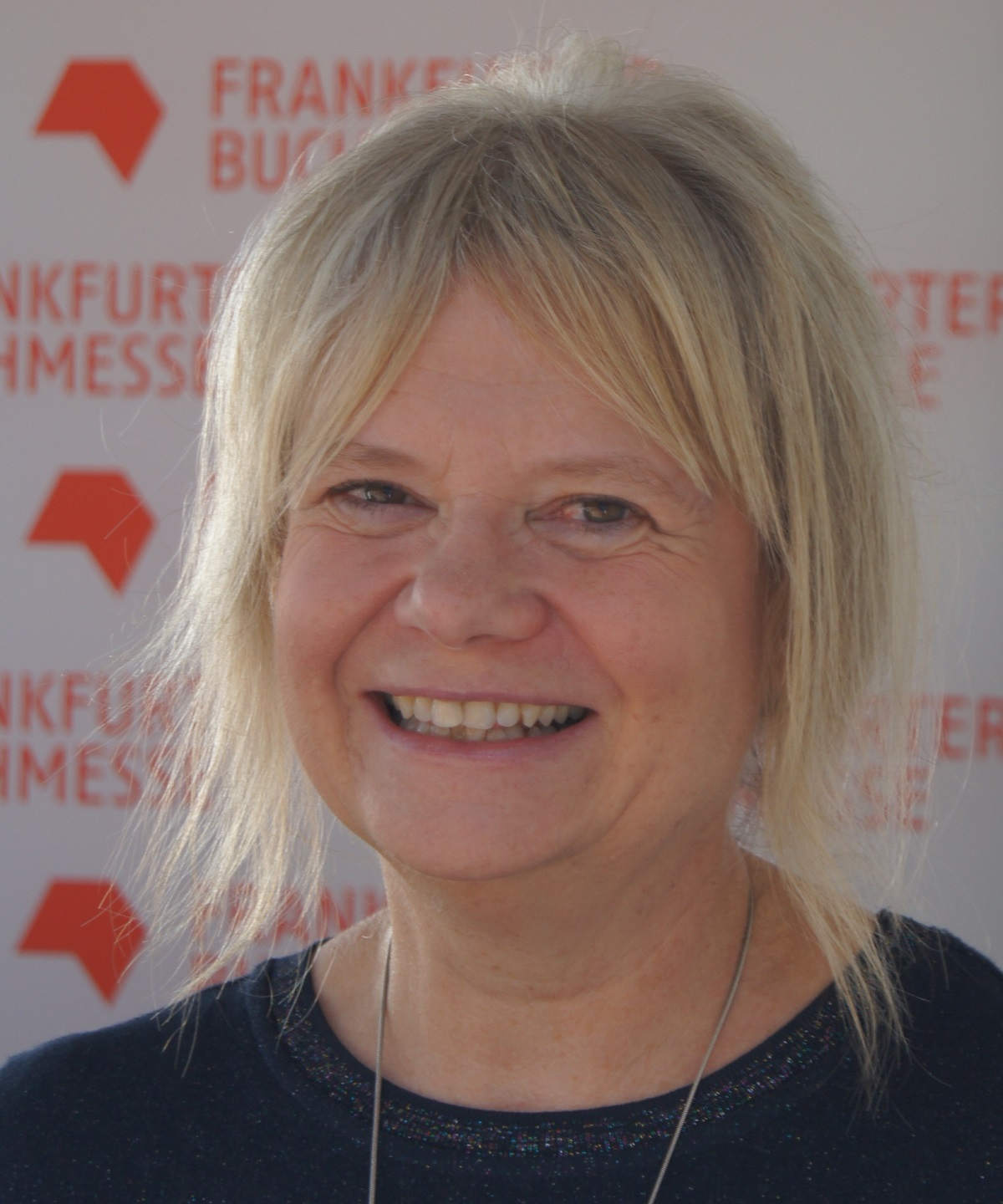
- Sarah Morgan (Frankfurt Book Fair 2018)
- Born: United Kingdom
- Occupation: Novelist
- Children: 2 sons
- Writing career
- Language: English
- Period: 2000–present
- Genres: Romance & Women's Fiction
- Notable awards: RITA Award (2012, 2013, 2017, 2019), RT Reviewers Choice Award (2012)
- Website: sarahmorgan.com

Sarah Morgan is a British writer of more than eighty romance novels and mainstream women's fiction from 2000.

== Biography ==
Morgan was a nurse before she started writing after the birth of her first son. She lives with her husband and two sons near London.

As a child, she dreamed of becoming a writer. Her professional background as a nurse is also reflected in her doctoral romances. Her specialty is contemporary romances, told in a humorous and sensual way. Many of her romances, such as the From Manhattan with love series, are based in New York City, Morgan's favorite city.

Her books were translated in several languages and sold more than 18 million copies worldwide. She is a Sunday Times and USA Today bestselling author.

== Awards ==
RITA Award presented by Romance Writers of America (RWA)

- 2011 Dare She Date The Dreamy Doc (Short Contemporary Series, finalist)
- 2012 Doukaki's Apprentice (Contemporary Series, winner)
- 2013 A Night of No Return (Short Contemporary Series, winner)
- 2014 Sleigh Bells in the Snow (Contemporary Single Title, finalist)
- 2017 Miracle on 5th Avenue (Long Contemporary Romance, winner)
- 2019 How To Keep A Secret (Mainstream Fiction with a Central Romance, winner)

RT Reviewers Choice Award

- 2012 The Forbidden Ferrara (Harlequin Presents, winner)

All About Romance Reader Award

- 2015 Playing by the Greek's Rules (Best Category Romance, winner)

== Booklist ==
- The Doctor's Engagement (2001)
- Worth The Risk (2001)
- The Midwife’s Child (2001)
- The Nurse's Christmas Wish (2005)
- Gift of a Family (2005)
- Million-dollar love-child (2006)
- Ripped (2013)
- Burned (2014)

=== Lakeside Mountain Rescue Series ===
- The Doctor's Christmas Bride (2004)
- The Nurse's Wedding Rescue (2004)
- The Midwife's Marriage Proposal (2005)
- The Christmas Marriage Rescue (2006)
- The Midwife's Christmas Miracle (2006)
- Italian Doctor, Sleigh-Bell Bride (2008)
- Snowbound: Miracle Marriage (2009)
- Christmas Eve: Doorstep Delivery (2010)

=== Glenmore Island Doctors Series ===
- A Bride for Glenmore (2007)
- Single Father, Wife Needed (2007)
- The Rebel Doctor's Bride (2008)
- Dare She Date the Dreamy Doc? (2010)

=== The Private Lives of Public Playboys Series ===
- A Night of No Return (2012)
- Lost to the Desert Warrior (2013)
- Woman in a Sheikh's World (2014)

=== Puffin Island Series ===
- Playing by the Greek's Rules
- First Time in Forever (2015)
- Some Kind of Wonderful (2015)
- Christmas Ever After (2015)

=== O'Neil Brothers Series ===
- Sleigh Bells in the Snow (2013)
- Suddenly Last Summer (2014)
- Maybe This Christmas (2014)

=== From Manhattan with Love Series ===
- Midnight at Tiffany's (2015)
- Sleepless in Manhattan (2016)
- Sunset in Central Park (2016)
- Miracle on 5th Avenue (2016)
- A New York Christmas Fairy Tale (2016)
- New York, actually (2017)
- Holiday in the Hamptons (2017)
- Moonlight over Manhattan (2017)

=== Standalone novels ===
- How to Keep a Secret (2018)
- The Christmas Sisters (2018)
- One Summer In Paris (2019)
- A Wedding in December (2019)
- Family for Beginners (2020)
- One More for Christmas (2020)
- The Summer Seekers (2021)
- The Christmas Escape (2021)
- Beach House Summer (05/2022)
- Snowed in for Christmas (10/2022)
- The Christmas Book Club (10/2023)
- The Christmas Cottage (10/2024)
