= Linda Barlow =

American author

Linda Ruth Barlow
- Born: Boston, Massachusetts, U.S.
- Education: Wheaten College (BA); Boston College (MA)
- Occupations: Novelist, IT consultant
- Writing career
- Pen name: Linda Barlow
- Period: 1984-present
- Genres: contemporary romance, historical romance, general fiction, thrillers, romantic suspense
- Notable work: Leaves of Fortune
- Notable awards: Golden Medallion – Single Title Romance; 1989 Leaves of Fortune
- Website: www.lindabarlow.com

Linda Ruth Barlow is an American author of contemporary romance, historical romance, general fiction, thrillers, and romantic suspense. She has won numerous industry awards, including the 1989 Romance Writers of America RITA Award for Best Single Title Romance for her novel Leaves of Fortune, Romantic Times' Best New Historical Novelist of 1986, and a Lifetime Achievement award from Romantic Times. She is also vice president of Monash Research, an IT consultant firm.

== Biography ==
Barlow was born in Boston, MA and in addition to writing books, she has taught university courses, co-founded a software company, and served as an expert witness on search engine technology. Her books have been translated into approximately 20 foreign languages. She contributed two essays to Dangerous Men and Adventurous Women, a collection of essays on the romance industry edited by Jayne Ann Krentz. This book won the Susan Koppelman Award for Excellence in Feminist Studies of Popular Culture and American Culture in 1993.

Barlow earned a BA from Wheaton College and an MA from Boston College, where she was a doctoral fellow in English literature for several years. Since then, she held served on the faculty of Boston College and Middle East Technical University (Orta Dogu Teknik Universitisi) in Ankara, Turkey. Barlow did graduate work in biology at Harvard University, where she was a teaching assistant for Comparative Functional Anatomy of the Vertebrates at the Harvard Extension School. In addition, she taught Neurobiology and Anatomy and Physiology at Cambridge College. Barlow has also given workshops and seminars all over the United States.

She started her career in IT at MIT's Technology Review, and wrote non-fiction articles on technical writing, training, and editing, scholarly articles, as well as on various software/online services industry topics, including an early 1990s-era guide to Web search engines called, The Spider's Apprentice. She co-wrote "America In-Line, Does This Suck, or What?" with Curt Monash about AOL appearing in Upside Magazine's May 1997 issue.

She is currently vice president of Monash Research and in the past has managed or contributed heavily to technology and interface development, marketing, finance and operations for the company. She consults, edits, and does speechwriting/speech-doctoring, and expert witness testimony on search engine-related issues for the company's clients.

She was Romance Writers of America's keynote speaker at the annual conference in 1989. She served as President of Novelists, Inc. in 1992 and did two three-year terms on the Executive Council of the Authors Guild in the 1990s. She currently serves as a member of the Novelists, Inc. Advisory Council.

== Bibliography ==
=== Adams ===
Contemporary Romance

1. Flights of Fancy. April 1984.
2. Bewitched. October 1984.
3. Knight of Passion. January 1985.
4. By Love Possessed. May 1985.

=== Night Games ===
1. Blazing Nights: Kate. September 2013.

=== Trevor Family Chronicles ===
Historical Romance

1. Fires of Destiny. August 1986.
2. Her Sister's Keeper. April 1993.

=== Stand-alone works ===
Paranormal Romance

- Midnight Rambler. October 1987.
- The Zrakon's Curse. October 2014.

Thriller

- Uncover Me. August 2014.

General Fiction

- The Zrakon's Bride. July 2014.

Romantic Suspense

- Intimate Betrayal. November 1995.

Contemporary Romance

- Beguiled. January 1984.
- Siren's Song. November 1985.
- Hold Back the Night. November 1986.
- Hunter's Bride. June 1993.
- Keepsake. December 1994.
- ——; William G. Tapply. Thicker Than Water. September 1995.

Historical Romance

- Leaves of Fortune. September 1988.

=== Non-fiction ===
- "Beneath the Surface: The Hidden Codes of Romance" essay with Jayne Ann Krentz in Dangerous Men and Adventurous Women: Romance Writers on the Appeal of the Romance (1992, ISBN 0-8122-3192-9, 0-8122-1411-0)
- "The Androgynous Writer: Another View of Point of View" essay in Dangerous Men and Adventurous Women: Romance Writers on the Appeal of the Romance (1992, ISBN 0-8122-3192-9, 0-8122-1411-0)

== Awards and reception ==
Awards for Linda Barlow
Year	Nominated work	Category	Award	Result	Notes	Ref.
1986	Siren's Song	Jove Second Chance	Romantic Times Reviewers Choice Award	Won		
1986			Romantic Times Best New Historical Romance Author	Won		
1989	Leaves of Fortune	Single Title Romance	Romance Writers of America Golden Medallion	Won		
1995			Inaugural winner of the Romantic Times Career Achievement Best Author in Contemporary Novel Award	Won		

Romantic Times named Intimate Betrayal and Thicker Than Water as Top Picks.

Her RITA-winning novel Leaves of Fortune received mixed industry reviews. Kirkus Reviews called it a "murky brew, complete with ghostly visitations..." Publishers Weekly said, "Past and present collide predictably in a competent, though not especially exciting novel... The most compelling, evocative scenes take place in India... Otherwise, this is a largely overheated brew of incest, New Age mysticism and dark deeds." However, The New York Times listed it as a noteworthy book in 1990 and the original reviewer said "it should be subtitled 'Something for Everyone.' The novel has 'channeling and crystals for the New Age crowd. And for mainstream readers, there is money, lots of it, as well as power plays, revenge, death and even eating disorders.'"
