= Eileen Charbonneau =

American novelist

- Occupation: Novelist
- Writing career
- Notable work: The Ghosts of Stony Cove
- Notable awards: Golden Medallion – Young Adult Romance; 1989 The Ghosts of Stony Cove

Eileen Charbonneau is a novelist whose books include The Connor Emerald (2000), Rachel LeMoyne (1999), The Randolph Legacy (1998), and Waltzing in Ragtime (1996). Her books for young people are The Ghosts of Stony Clove (1988), In the Time of Wolves (1994), Honor to the Hills (1997). Charbonneau was raised in Valley Stream, New York. She lives in the Hudson River Valley of New York, and in the Catskill Mountains, with her husband. They have two daughters, Abigail and Marya, and a son, Lawrence. Eileen Charbonneau is sister to the actress Patricia Charbonneau.

== Awards and reception ==
- 1989 - Romance Writers of America Golden Medallion, Young Adult Romance – The Ghosts of Stony Cove
