= Susan Carroll (author) =

American novelist

Susan Carol Cute Coppula
- Born: Susan Carol Cute; 1952 (age 73–74)
- Occupation: Novelist
- Children: 2
- Writing career
- Pen name: Susan Carroll; Serena Richards
- Language: English
- Period: 1986–present
- Genre: Romance
- Notable works: Sugar Rose, Brighton Road, The Bride Finder
- Notable awards: Golden Medallion – Regency Romance; 1988 Sugar Rose Golden Medallion – Regency Romance; 1989 Brighton Road RITA award – Paranormal Romance; 1999 The Bride Finder

Susan Coppula, née Susan Carol Cute (born 1952) is an American writer of romance novels under her pen names, Susan Carroll and Serena Richards since 1986.

== Biography ==
Born Susan Carol Cute in 1952, Susan Coppula obtained a Degree in English with complementary studies in history in the Indiana University. Since 1986, Susan has published books under three different pseudonyms: Susan Carroll, Susan Coppula, and Serena Richards. Susan lives in Rock Island, Illinois.

== Bibliography ==
=== As Susan Carroll ===
==== Stand alone novels ====
- The Lady Who Hated Shakespeare, 1986/No
- The Sugar Rose, 1987/Jul
- Brighton Road, 1988/Oct
- The Bishop's Daughter, 1990/Sep
- The Wooing of Miss Masters, 1991/Sep
- Mistress Mischief, 1992/Jul
- Christmas Belles, 1992/Sep
- Miss Prentiss and the Yankee, 1993/Nov
- The Valentine's Day Ball, 1993/Dec
- Black Lace and Linen, 1994/Fev
- Love Power, 1994/Aug
- The Painted Veil, 1995/Aug
- Parker and the Gypsy, 1997/Sep

==== St. Leger Family Saga Series ====
1. The Bride Finder, 1998/Sep
2. The Night Drifter, 1999/Sep
3. Midnight Bride (originally titled Valentine's Bride), 2001/Apr

==== The Dark Queen Saga ====
1. The Dark Queen, 2005/Mar series 1
2. The Courtesan, 2005/Jul
3. The Silver Rose, 2006/Mar
4. The Huntress, 2007/Jul
5. Twilight of a Queen, 2009/Jul
6. The Lady of Secrets, 2012/Dec

==== Omnibus ====
- Brighton Road / The Sugar Rose, 1994/Jun

=== As Susan Coppula ===
==== Winter Macy Series ====
1. Winterbourne, 1987/Mar
2. Shades of winter, 1988

==== Single novels ====
- Avenging Angel, 1991

=== As Serena Richards ===
==== Single novels ====
- Masquerade, 1989
- Escapade, 1991
- Rendezvous, 1991

== Awards ==
Awards for Susan Carroll
| Year | Nominated work | Category | Award | Result | Notes | Ref. |
|---|---|---|---|---|---|---|
| 1988 | Sugar Rose | Regency Romance | Romance Writers of America Golden Medallion | Won | | |
| 1989 | Brighton Road | Regency Romance | Romance Writers of America Golden Medallion | Won | | |
| 1999 | The Bride Finder | Paranormal Romance | Romance Writers of America RITA Award | Won | | |
