= Karen Rose =

American novelist

- Born: Karen Rose Hafer; Baltimore, Maryland, U.S.
- Occupation: Novelist
- Genre: Romantic suspense
- Notable awards: RITA Award

Website
- www.karenrosebooks.com

Karen Rose (born Karen Rose Hafer in Baltimore, Maryland, United States) is an internationally bestselling, RITA-award winning romantic suspense author. Rose was born and raised in the Maryland suburbs of Washington, D.C. She met her husband, Martin, on a blind date when they were seventeen and after they both graduated from the University of Maryland (Karen with a degree in chemical engineering), they moved to Cincinnati, Ohio. Karen worked as a chemical engineer for a large consumer goods company, earning two patents, but as Karen says, “scenes were roiling in my head and I couldn't concentrate on my job so I started writing them down. I started out writing for fun, and soon found I was hooked.”

Her debut suspense novel, Don't Tell, was released in July, 2003. Since then, she has published more than fifteen novels and two novellas. Her twenty-fifth novel, Say No More, was released in August 2020.

Karen's books have appeared on the bestseller lists of the New York Times, USA Today, London's Sunday Times, and Germany's Der Spiegel (#1), and the Irish Times, as well as lists in South Africa (#1) and Australia.

Her novels, I'm Watching You and Silent Scream, received the Romance Writers of America's RITA award for Best Romantic Suspense for 2005 and 2011. Five of her other books have been RITA finalists. To date, her books have been translated into more than twenty languages.

Karen's books are set in different US states. The books are connected, and characters from previous novels usually make appearances, even if they are not from those places.

A former high school teacher of chemistry and physics, Karen lives in Florida with her husband of more than thirty years and her dog, Loki.

== Bibliography ==
2003 – Don't Tell (Chicago Book 1)
2004 – Have You Seen Her? (Raleigh)
2004 – I'm Watching You (Chicago Book 2)
2005 – Nothing to Fear (Chicago Book 3)
2005 – Dirty Secrets (St. Petersburg, Florida novella, previously published in the anthology Hot Pursuit)
2006 – You Can't Hide (Chicago Book 4)
2007 – Count to Ten (Chicago Book 5)
2007 – Die for Me (Philadelphia/Atlanta Book 1)
2009 – Scream for Me (Philadelphia/Atlanta Book 2)
2009 – Kill for Me (Philadelphia/Atlanta Book 3)
2009 – I Can See You (Minneapolis Book 1)
2010 – Silent Scream (Minneapolis Book 2)
2011 – You Belong to Me (Baltimore Book 1)
2012 – No One Left to Tell (Baltimore Book 2)
2012 – Did You Miss Me? (Baltimore Book 3)
2013 – Broken Silence (Baltimore Book 3.5, novella)
2013 – Watch Your Back (Baltimore Book 4)
2014 – Closer Than You Think (Cincinnati Book 1)
2015 – Alone in the Dark (Cincinnati Book 2)
2016 – Every Dark Corner (Cincinnati Book 3)
2017 – Monster in the Closet (Baltimore Book 5)
2018 – Edge of Darkness (Cincinnati Book 4)
2018 – Death Is Not Enough (Baltimore Book 6)
2019 – Say You're Sorry (Sacramento Book 1)
2019 – Into the Dark (Cincinnati Book 5) [Release: Nov 14, 2019 (UK), Nov 26, 2019 (US) ]
2020 – Say No More (Sacramento Book 2)
2021 – Say Goodbye (Sacramento Book 3)
2022 – Quarter to Midnight (New Orleans Book 1)
2023 – Cold Blooded Liar (San Diego Book 1)
2023 – Beneath Dark Waters (New Orleans Book 2)
2024 – Cheater ("San Diego" Book 2)
2024 – Buried Too Deep ("New Orleans" Book 3)
2025 – Dead Man's List ("San Diego" Book 3)
