= Laura Kinsale =

American writer

- Education: University of Texas at Austin
- Occupation: Novelist
- Writing career
- Period: 1985-present
- Genre: Historical romance
- Notable works: The Prince of Midnight, Shadowheart
- Notable awards: RITA award – Best Romance of 1990; 1991 The Prince of Midnight; RITA award – Long Historical Romance; 2005 Shadowheart
- Website: www.laurakinsale.com

Laura Kinsale is an American writer of historical romance novels since 1985. She is a two time winner of the Romance Writers of America RITA Award.

== Biography ==
Kinsale has a Master of Science in Geology from the University of Texas at Austin. She worked in the petroleum industry before beginning to write. Now, she is a winner and multiple nominee for the Best Book of the Year award given by the Romance Writers of America.

She once characterized the oft-derided happy ending in romance novels as an "integration of the inner self."

== Career ==
Kinsale is the creator of Hedgehog Inc., which publishes audiobooks written by Kinsale and other authors, narrated by Nicholas Boulton and produced by The Story Circle, London. Several of the audiobooks released by Hedgehog Inc have been winners or nominees for AudioFile Earphones Awards.

== Bibliography ==
- Uncertain Magic, (1987/Mar)
- Midsummer Moon, (1987/Nov)
- Seize the Fire, (1989/Oct)
- The Prince of Midnight, (1990/Oct)
- Flowers From the Storm, (1992/Oct)
- The Dream Hunter, (1994/Dec)
- My Sweet Folly, (1997/Jan)
- Lessons in French, (2010/Feb)

=== Victorian Hearts Series ===
1. The Hidden Heart, (1986/Apr)
2. The Shadow and the Star, (1991/Oct)

=== Medieval Hearts Series ===
1. For My Lady's Heart, (1993/Dec)
2. Shadowheart, (2004/Apr)

=== Non-fiction ===
- "The Androgynous Reader: Point of View in the Romance" essay in Dangerous Men and Adventurous Women: Romance Writers on the Appeal of the Romance (1992, ISBN 0-8122-3192-9, 0-8122-1411-0)

== Awards ==
- 1991 - Romance Writers of America RITA Award, Best Romance of 1990 – The Prince of Midnight
- 2005 - Romance Writers of America RITA Award, Long Historical Romance – Shadowheart
- Midsummer Moon: 2013 Audiofile Magazine Earphones Award, Best Voices, Fiction and Classics
- My Sweet Folly: 2013 Audiofile Magazine Earphones Award, Best Voices, Fiction and Classics
- The Shadow and the Star: 2013 Audiofile Magazine Earphones Award, Best Voices, Fiction and Classics
- For My Lady’s Heart: by Laura Kinsale; Narrated by Nicholas Boulton; Hedgehog, Inc.; Audio Publishers Association, 2014 Best Romance Finalist
