= List of romantic novelists =

Notable novelists who specialise or specialised in writing romance novels include: (Note: A writer is presumed notable if they have received significant coverage in reliable sources that are independent of the writer and their affiliates and satisfies the Wikipedia inclusion criteria for a stand-alone article.)

== A ==
- Laura Abbot
- Hailey Abbott
- Shana Abé
- Maria Dolores Acevedo
- Cherry Adair
- Jennie Adams
- Lara Adrian
- Cecelia Ahern
- Michele Albert
- Rochelle Alers
- Kate Alexander
- Trisha Alexander
- Victoria Alexander
- Jo Ann Algermissen
- Barbara Allen
- Charlotte Vale Allen
- Harper Allen
- Joan M. Allen
- Heather Allison
- Elizabeth Amber
- Jessica Andersen
- Susan Andersen
- Caroline Anderson
- Catherine Anderson
- Barbara Andrews
- Lucilla Andrews
- Laura Anthony (pen name of Lori Wilde)
- Jane Arbor
- Catherine Archer
- Jennifer Archer
- Catherine Archibald
- Lindsay Armstrong
- Tilly Armstrong
- Judith Arnold
- Jane Ashford
- Dawn Atkins
- Kathryn Atwood
- Jane Austen
- Anne Avery
- Jessica Ayre

== B ==
- Jacqueline Baird
- Anne Baker
- Faith Baldwin
- Kathleen Baldwin
- Donna Ball
- Mary Balogh
- Leanne Banks
- Maya Banks
- Michele Bardsley
- Jill Barnett
- Jean Barrett
- Susan Barrie
- Allie Bates
- Jane Beaufort
- Sally Beauman
- Alex Beecroft
- Marguerite Bell
- Elísabet Benavent
- Jayne Bentley
- Laurien Berenson
- Ariel Berk
- Elizabeth Bevarly
- Jo Beverley
- Helen Bianchin
- Janet Bieber
- Maeve Binchy
- Charlotte Bingham
- Jessica Bird (also known as J. R. Ward)
- Claudia Bishop
- Jaid Black
- Jenna Black
- Terri Blackstock
- Ally Blake
- Andrea Blake
- Jennifer Blake
- Emma Blair
- Laurien Blair
- Diana Blayne
- Annalee Blysse
- Parris Afton Bonds
- Pat Booth
- Elaine Bossik
- Donna Boyd
- Joanna Bourne
- Carla Bracale
- Barbara Taylor Bradford
- Celeste Bradley
- Rita Bradshaw
- Taylor Brady
- Joan Bramsch
- Kylie Brant
- Kate Bridges
- Laurey Bright
- P.A. Brisco / Patty Brisco
- Leigh Bristol
- Annette Broadrick
- Anne Brock
- Suzanne Brockmann
- Connie Brockway
- Anne Brontë
- Charlotte Brontë
- Emily Brontë
- Helen Brooks
- Sandra Brown
- Diana Browning
- Dixie Browning
- Niobia Bryant
- Elizabeth Buchan
- M. L. Buchman
- Nancy Buckingham
- Mary Burchell
- Eleanor Burford
- Pamela Burford
- Rose Burghley
- Nicole Burnham
- Beatrice Burton
- Rebecca Burton
- Shirlee Busbee
- Rob Byrnes

== C ==
- Meg Cabot
- Hall Caine
- Linda Cajio
- Candace Camp
- Bethany Campbell
- Teresa Cameselle
- Marsha Canham
- Ann Carberry
- Ruth Cardello
- Donna Carlisle
- Liz Carlyle
- Teresa Carpenter
- Philippa Carr
- Robyn Carr
- Sherry Carr (also known as Lacey Dancer, Sara Chance, and Sydney Ann Clary)
- Tori Carrington
- Susan Carroll
- Rosemary Carter
- Barbara Cartland
- Zoe Cass (pseudonym of Lois Dorothea Low)
- Carla Cassidy
- Jayne Castle
- Clare Cavendish
- Diane Chamberlain
- Sara Chance (also known as Lacey Dancer, Sherry Carr, and Sydney Ann Clary)
- Lauryn Chandler
- Anita Charles
- Marie Charles
- Loretta Chase
- Marion Chesney
- Sarah Chester
- Denise Chesterton (pseudonym of Denise Naomi Klein Robins Pearson)
- Maureen Child
- Jill Christian (a pseudonym of Norren Dilcock)
- Sue Civil-Brown
- Daphne Clair
- Sydney Ann Clary (also known as Lacey Dancer, Sherry Carr, and Sara Chance)
- Rita Clay
- Margaret Major Cleaves
- Wendy Coakley-Thompson
- Sheila Coates
- Nicole Cody
- Jan Coffey
- Elaine Coffman
- Jackie Collins
- Phoebe Conn
- Helen Conrad
- Carla Cook
- Catherine Cookson
- Deborah Coonts
- Jilly Cooper
- Lori Copeland
- Susan Coppula
- Lecia Cornwall
- Catherine Coulter
- Caroline Courtney
- Josephine Cox
- Helen Crampton
- Sara Craven
- Jasmine Cresswell
- Millie Criswell
- Linda Crockett
- Tanya Anne Crosby
- Jennifer Crusie
- Katy Currie

== D ==
- Janet Dailey
- Claudia Dain
- Ruth Jean Dale
- Blanche d'Alpuget
- Cami Dalton
- Margot Dalton
- Barbara Daly
- Lacey Dancer
- Jordan Dane
- B.J. Daniels
- Emma Darcy
- Lilian Darcy
- Iris Rainer Dart
- Trisha David
- MaryJanice Davidson
- Geralyn Dawson
- Sylvia Day
- Daphne de Jong
- Kit Dealtry (a pseudonym by Kathleen Clarice Louise Cornwell Klein Dealtry Groom)
- Connie Deka
- Barbara Delinsky
- Jude Deveraux
- Jacqueline Diamond
- Christina Dodd
- Robyn Donald
- Sara Donati
- Jane Donnelly
- Carole Nelson Douglas
- Billie Douglass
- Zoe Dozier
- Bonnie Drake
- Shannon Drake
- Jennifer Drew
- Daphne du Maurier
- Elizabeth Duke
- Judith Duncan
- Carola Dunn
- Lee Duran

== E ==
- Kathleen Eagle
- Mignon G. Eberhart
- Dorothy Eden
- Rosemary Edghill
- Cassie Edwards
- Mary Tate Engels
- Tina Engler
- Suzanne Enoch
- Erastes
- Lynn Erickson
- Patricia Ernst
- Leslie Esdaile
- Rita Clay Estrada
- Janet Evanovich
- Shoshanna Evers

== F ==
- Ann Fairfax
- Barbara Faith
- Colleen Faulkner
- Jane Feather
- Constance Fecher (a pseudonym by Constance Fecher Heaven)
- Christine Feehan
- Marie Ferrarella
- Gina Ferris
- Katie Fforde
- Sandra Field
- Liz Fielding
- Trini de Figueroa
- Rebecca Flanders
- Fiona Finlay
- Cardine Fleming
- Caroline Fleming
- Gaelen Foley
- Norrey Ford (a pseudonym of Norren Dilcock)
- Helen Forrester
- Lori Foster
- Natalie Fox
- Jacqueline Frank
- Thea Frederick
- Ashley French

== G ==
- Diana Gabaldon
- Patricia Gaffney
- Abby Gaines
- Shana Galen (also known as Shane Bolks)
- Rita Gallagher
- Clarissa Garland
- Dorothy Garlock
- Julie Garwood
- Diane Gaston (also known as Diane Perkins)
- Tess Gerritsen
- Rachel Gibson
- Amanda Glass
- Ruth Glick
- Elinor Glyn
- Kristi Gold
- Emma Goldrick
- Sergeanne Golon
- Diana Gordon
- Lucy Gordon
- Judith Gould
- Iris Gower
- Heather Graham
- Lynne Graham
- Jeanne Grant
- Susan Grant
- Vanessa Grant
- Patricia Grasso
- Harriet Gray
- Maysie Coucher Greig
- Jennifer Greene
- Tilly Greene
- Lisa Gregory
- Clarice Groom / C. Groom / Kathleen Clarice Groom / Mrs. Sydney Groom (pseudonyms by Kathleen Clarice Louise Cornwell Klein Dealtry Groom)
- Annie Groves
- Carmela Gutiérrez de Gambra

== H ==
- Elizabeth Habersham
- Ginn Hale
- Jocelyn Haley
- Alexis Hall
- Steffie Hall
- Diana Hamilton
- Hervey Hamilton (a pseudonym of Denise Naomi Klein Robins Pearson)
- Laurell K. Hamilton
- Anne Hampson
- Jenny Han
- Lori Handeland
- Kristin Hannah
- Barbara Hannay
- Sarah Hardesty
- Laura Hardy
- Karen Harper
- Madeline Harper
- Lisa Harris
- Elizabeth Harrison
- Jessica Hart
- Sarah Hart
- Caroline Harvey
- Kathryn Harvey
- Diana Haviland
- Karen Hawkins
- Constance Heaven (a pseudonym by Constance Fecher Heaven)
- Shirl Henke
- Virginia Henley
- Ann Herendeen
- Georgette Heyer
- Brenda Hiatt
- Grace Livingston Hill
- Lydia Hitchcock
- Tami Hoag
- Helen Hoang
- Kate Hoffmann
- Joan Hohl
- Sheila Holland
- Emma Holly
- Kate Holmes
- Victoria Holt (also known as Eleanor Hibbert, Jean Plaidy, Philippa Carr)
- Kay Hooper
- Linda Howard (also known as Linda S. Howington)
- Hannah Howell
- Elizabeth Hoyt
- Anna Hudson
- Callie Hugher
- Cally Hughes
- Charlotte Hughes
- Karen Hughes
- Victor Hugo
- Jena Hunt
- Jillian Hunter
- Jackie Hyman

== I ==
- Averil Ives
- Judith Ivory

== J ==
- Brenda Jackson
- Lisa Jackson
- Anna Jacobs
- Michele Jaffe
- Anna James
- E.L. James
- Eloisa James
- Julie James
- Kristin James
- Stephanie James
- Susan James (pen name of Rochelle Alers)
- Vanessa James
- Claudia Jameson
- Kelly Jamison
- Miranda Jarrett
- Sabrina Jeffries
- Michelle Jerott
- Iris Johansen
- Nancy John
- Milly Johnson
- Susan Johnson
- Joan Johnston
- Linda O. Johnston
- Catherine Jones
- Jan Jones
- Crystal Jordan
- Laura Jordan
- Nicole Jordan
- Penny Jordan
- B.D. Joyce
- Brenda Joyce
- Janet Joyce
- Jenna Lee Joyce

== K ==
- Karin Kallmaker
- Andrea Kane
- Julia Kane
- Kathleen Kane
- Alex Kava
- Karen Kay
- Patricia Kay
- Corey Keaton
- Lindsey Kelk
- Kathleen Kellow
- Carla Kelly
- Nancy Kelly
- Sharon Kendrick
- Elle Kennedy
- Kathryne Kennedy
- Lena Kennedy
- Julie Kenner
- Pamela Kent
- Cory Kenyon
- Sherrilyn Kenyon
- Madeleine Ker
- Flora Kidd
- Susan King
- Maggie Kingsley
- Laura Kinsale
- Alexandra Kirk
- Sandra Kitt
- Lisa Kleypas
- TJ Klune
- Angela Knight
- Karleen Koen
- Rosanne Kohake
- Betina Krahn
- Judith Krantz
- Jayne Ann Krentz (also known as Amanda Quick, Jayne Castle)
- Susan Krinard
- Lynn Kurland
- Susan Kyle

== L ==
- Kate Lace
- Patricia Lake
- Rozella Lake
- Arnette Lamb
- Charlotte Lamb
- Alice Elinor Lambert
- Elizabeth Lambert
- Sheila Lancaster
- Jill Marie Landis
- Connie Lane
- Elizabeth Lane
- Roumelia Lane
- Chloe Lang
- Ruth Langan
- Tania Langley
- Cheryl Lanham
- Christina Lauren
- Stephanie Laurens
- Constance Laux
- Kathy Lawrence
- Day Leclaire
- Jane LeCompte
- Miranda Lee
- Rachel Lee
- Lora Leigh
- Roberta Leigh
- Judith Lennox
- Marion Lennox
- Laura Leone
- Julie Elizabeth Leto
- Kathryn Le Veque
- Marjorie Lewty
- Alice Chetwynd Ley
- Sophie Leyton (a pseudonym of Sheila Walsh)
- Rachel Lindsay
- Johanna Lindsey
- Cathie Linz
- Rosina Lippi
- Caren Lissner
- Cait Logan
- Cait London
- Hilary London
- Julia London
- William Stuart Long
- Claire Lorel
- Amii Lorin
- Emilie Loring
- Claire Lorrimer (a pseudonym of Patricia Denise Robins)
- Dorothy Mackie Low (a pseudonym of Lois Dorothea Low)
- Elizabeth Lowell
- Mary Lyons

== M ==
- Heather MacAllister
- Katie MacAlister (also known as Katie Maxwell and Kate Marsh)
- Kinley MacGregor
- Allie Mackay
- Mary Mackie (also wrote as Cathy Christopher, Alex Andrews and Caroline Charles)
- Jan MacLean
- Della Campbell MacLeod
- Debbie Macomber
- Ann Major
- Susan Mallery
- Anne Mallory
- Raynetta Mañees
- Jill Mansell
- Joanna Mansell
- Winifred Langford Mantle (also known as Jan Blaine, Anne Fellowes, Frances Lang and Jane Langford)
- Jill March
- Joanna Marcus
- Deb Marlowe
- Katherine Marlowe
- Ellen Tanner Marsh
- Debra Marshall
- Deborah Martin
- Gail Gaymer Martin
- Gail Z. Martin
- Kat Martin
- Laura Martin
- Sandra Marton
- Kasey Marx
- Jessica Massey
- Anne Mather (also known as Caroline Fleming and Cardine Fleming)
- Laura Matthews
- Patricia Matthews
- A.E. Maxwell
- Kathleen Maxwell
- Mary Maxwell
- Patricia Maxwell
- Anne Mayfield
- Margaret Mayo
- Anne McAllister
- Laurie McBain
- Susanne McCarthy
- Barbara McCauley
- May McGoldrick
- Tate McKenna
- Meagan McKinney
- Rena McLeary
- Barbara McMahon
- Karen McManus
- Kate McMurray
- Judith McNaught
- Casey McQuiston
- Teresa Medeiros
- Susan Meier
- Christina Merlin (a pseudonym by Constance Fecher Heaven)
- Stephenie Meyer
- Judith Michael
- Marie Michael
- Barbara Michaels
- Fern Michaels
- Leigh Michaels
- Linda Lael Miller
- Serena B. Miller
- Sarah Mlynowski
- Nicole Mones
- Karen Marie Moning
- Karyn Monk
- Margaret Moore
- Rachel Moore
- Peggy Moreland
- Hunter Morgan
- Raye Morgan
- Peggy Morse
- Carole Mortimer
- Jill Munroe

== N ==
- Nancy Naigle
- Susan Naiper
- Betty Neels
- Deborah Nicholas
- Marie Nicole
- Celeste O. Norfleet
- Freya North
- Brenda Novak

== O ==
- Constance O'Day-Flannery
- Laurel O'Donnell
- Elisabeth Ogilvie
- Janette Oke
- Elizabeth Oldfield
- Margaret O'Neill
- Kathy Orr
- Ruth Owen

== P ==
- Lynda Page
- Rebecca Paisley
- Diana Palmer
- Margaret Pargeter
- Adele Parks
- Delia Parr
- Roan Parrish
- Valerie Parv
- Ann Patrick
- Lynn Patrick
- Maxine Patrick
- Lois Paxton (a pseudonym of Lois Dorothea Low)
- Rachel Cosgrove Payes
- Diane Pearson
- Judith Pella
- Rafael Pérez y Pérez
- Diane Perkins (also known as Diane Gaston)
- Carly Phillips
- Dorothy Phillips
- Johanna Phillips
- Susan Elizabeth Phillips
- Joan Elliott Pickart
- Rosamunde Pilcher
- Suzy Pizzuti
- Neil S. Plakcy
- Belva Plain
- Edgar Allan Poe
- Ida Pollock
- Patricia Ponder
- Jane Porter
- Elizabeth Power
- Heather Graham Pozzessere
- ArLynn Leiber Presser
- Evadne Price
- Mary Jo Putney

== Q ==
- Angela Quarles
- Carol Queen
- Erica Quest
- Amanda Quick (also known as Jayne Ann Krentz, Jayne Castle)
- Julia Quinn
- Paula Quinn

== R ==
- Ann Radcliffe
- Radclyffe
- Karen Ranney
- Francis Ray
- Jaclyn Reding
- Laura Resnick
- Luanne Rice
- Emilie Richards
- Serena Richards
- Emma Richmond
- Christie Ridgway
- Judith Merkle Riley
- Christine Rimmer
- Francine Rivers
- Karen Robards
- J.D. Robb
- JoAnn Robb
- JoAnn Robbins
- Nora Roberts
- Paula Roberts
- Patricia Robertson
- Denise Robins
- Patricia Robins (a pseudonym of Patricia Denise Robins)
- Suzanne Robinson
- Claire Robyns
- Pam Rock
- Rosemary Rogers
- Kristine Rolofson
- Jeanne Rose
- Pam Rosenthal
- JoAnn Ross
- Kathryn Ross
- Renee Roszel
- Ann Roth
- Barbara Rowan
- Rosamond Royal
- Nan Ryan
- Nancy Henderson Ryan
- Patricia Ryan
- Rachel Ryan

== S ==
- Lynsay Sands
- Robin Schone
- Alicia Scott
- Janey Scott
- Sara Seale
- Alexandra Sellers
- Anya Seton
- Jill Shalvis
- Merry Shannon
- Maggie Shayne
- Jill Sheldon
- Sidney Sheldon
- Suzanne Sherrill
- Valerie Sherwood
- Gena Showalter
- Anita Shreve
- Elsie Silver
- Linnea Sinclair
- Rebecca Sinclair
- Nalini Singh
- Susan Sizemore
- Christina Skye
- Bertrice Small
- Lass Small
- Barbara Dawson Smith
- Joan Smith
- Karen Rose Smith
- Alexandra Sokoloff
- Teresa Southwick
- Nicholas Sparks
- Terry Spear
- LaVyrle Spencer
- Erin St. Claire
- Lael St. James (pen name of Linda Lael Miller)
- Danielle Steel
- Jessica Steele
- Sharon Stephens
- Mariah Stewart
- Mary Stewart
- Bram Stoker
- Katherine Stone
- Alex Stuart
- Anne Stuart
- Robyn Stuart
- V.A. Stuart
- Vivian Stuart
- Katherine Sutcliffe
- Kari Sutherland
- Shanna Swendson

== T ==
- Gladys Taber
- Janelle Taylor
- Jayne Taylor
- Jennifer Taylor
- Corín Tellado
- Sarah Temple
- Cathy Gillen Thacker
- Joyce Thies
- Diane Thomas
- Jodi Thomas
- Rosie Thomas
- Kate Thompson
- Vicki Lewis Thompson
- Elizabeth Thornton
- Kay Thorpe
- Sylvia Thorpe (a pseudonym of June Sylvia Thimblethorpe)
- Jacqueline Topaz
- Betty Trask
- Elizabeth Trehearne
- Jennie Tremaine
- Adriana Trigiani

== V ==
- Karen Van der Zee
- Mona Van Wieren

== W ==
- Tina Wainscott
- Christian Walford (a pseudonym of Norren Dilcock)
- Elizabeth Walker
- Kate Walker
- Shiloh Walker
- Pamela Wallace
- Vivienne Wallington
- Maggie Walsh
- Sheila Walsh (also known as Sophie Leyton)
- J. R. Ward (also known as Jessica Bird)
- Charlotte Ward
- Linda Warren
- Nancy Warren
- Pat Warren
- Wendy Warren
- Elsie B. Washington (using the pseudonym Rosalind Welles)
- Shannon Waverly
- Margaret Way
- Joanna Wayne
- Anne Weale
- Carrie Weaver
- Ingrid Weaver
- Debra Webb
- Peggy Webb
- Meredith Webber
- Tawny Weber
- Theresa Weir
- Sue-Ellen Welfonder
- Kate Welsh
- Sally Wentworth
- Sophie Weston
- Edith Wharton
- Yvonne Whittal
- Mary Whistler
- Susan Wiggs
- Jane Wilby
- Jennifer Wilde
- Lori Wilde (also writes as Laura Anthony)
- Quinn Wilder
- Gina Ferris Wilkins
- Lee Wilkinson
- Eileen Wilks
- Bronwyn Williams
- Cathy Williams
- Tammy Williams
- Penelope Williamson
- Penn Williamson
- Lauren Willig
- Patricia Wilson
- Kathleen Winsor
- Violet Winspear
- Anne Marie Winston
- Rebecca Winters
- Linda Randall Wisdom
- Joan Wolf
- Barbara Wood
- Sara Wood
- Anne Woodard
- Kathleen E. Woodiwiss
- Sherryl Woods
- Victoria Woolf
- Francesca Wright
- Laura Wright
- Melinda Wright
- Laura Wylie
- Trish Wylie
- Pamela Wynne

== X-Z ==
- Jane Yardley
- Rebecca York
- Karen Young
- Carolyn Zane
