= Kathleen Maxwell =

Kathleen Maxwell may refer to:

- A pseudonym of American writer Kathryn Ptacek
- A character in the miniseries V, played by Penelope Windust
