= Connie Lane =

Connie Lane may refer to:

- Connie Lane, pen name of Constance Laux, American writer of romance novels
- Connie Lane (politician), member of the New Hampshire House of Representatives
