= Carolyn Zane =

American novelist

Carolyn Pizzuti
- Occupation: Novelist
- Spouse: Matt Pizzuti (1978-Present)
- Children: Madeline, Grace, Gabriel, Olivia, Silas
- Writing career
- Pen name: Carolyn Zane; Suzy Pizzuti
- Period: 1993–present
- Genre: Romance
- Website: www.carolynzane.net

Carolyn Pizzuti is an American author of romance novels under the pen name Carolyn Zane. She has also been published as Suzy Pizzuti.

== Biography ==
Carolyn was born to Douglas Owen Tope and Mary Patricia Willis and raised in Southern California. When she was five, her family, including younger sister, Judy, moved to Oregon. Carolyn graduated from high school in 1976 in Silverton, Oregon and enrolled at Oregon State University, where she majored in broadcast/speech communications. In 1978, she married her college sweetheart, Matt, and, in 1981, she graduated from OSU and moved to Portland. She worked as a producer/director for local television commercials.

=== Family ===
On their sixteenth wedding anniversary, Carolyn and her husband welcomed their first daughter, Madeline Alexa. A second daughter, Olivia RoseAnne, followed four years later. In 2003, they added an infant son of Guatemalan descent, Silas Matthew, through adoption. When he was 18 months, an African American sibling set, Grace Elizabeth and Gabriel Robert were added to the family, adopted through foster care. While her five children were small, Zane wanted to find a career that she could follow from home.

=== Writing career ===
In March 1993 she finished her first romance novel, The Wife Next Door, which was soon purchased by Silhouette. Since then, she has had more than 30 novels published by four publishers, with several million copies in print worldwide. Her work has been selected as Top Pick by Romantic Times, where Cheryl Hanson described her latest work Beyond the Storm by saying, "The writing is so riveting and real that you'll feel the storm and the pain of the aftermath." Reviewer Pamela Cohen says Zane's genre books are "strong on humor, snappy repartee and passionate moments."

Two of her novels have been inspirational romances, written under the pen name Suzy Pizzuti. These were released in 1998 and 1999. After what Zane refers to as the world's longest maternity leave, she went back to work as the launch author for Abingdon Press's Quilts of Love series. Her book, Beyond the Storm, inspired by the Joplin/Tuscaloosa tornadoes, debuted October 2012.

== Works ==
=== Brubaker Brides Series ===
- Miss Prim's Untamable Cowboy (1997)
- His Brother's Intended Bride (1997)
- Cinderella's Secret Baby (1998)
- The Rich Gal's Rented Groom (1998)
- Johnny's Pregnant Bride (1999)
- The Millionaire's Waitress Wife (2000)
- Montana's Feisty Cowgirl (2000)
- Tex's Exasperating Heiress (2001)
- Carolina's Gone a Courting (2004)
- Georgia Gets Her Groom! (2004)
- Virginia's Getting Hitched (2004)

=== Novels ===
- Wife in Name Only (1994)
- The Wife Next Door (1994)
- The Baby Factor (1995)
- Unwilling Wife (1995)
- Weekend Wife (1995)
- Bachelor Blues (1995)
- How to Hook a Husband (And a Baby) (1996)
- Marriage in a Bottle (1996)
- Single in Seattle (1996)
- It's Raining Grooms (1997)
- Of Royal Blood (2002)
- Taking on Twins (2002)
- The Cinderella Inheritance (2003)

=== Quilts of Love Series ===
- Beyond the Storm (2012)

=== Omnibus ===
- The Family Factor (2002) (with Marie Ferrarella)
- The Bluest Eyes in Texas / Wife in Name Only (2002) (with Joan Johnston)
- A Colton Family Christmas (2002) (with Judy Christenberry, Linda Turner)
- Of Royal Blood / In Pursuit of a Princess (2003) (with Donna Clayton)
- The Coltons: Brides of Privilege (2004) (with Ruth Langan, Kasey Michaels)
- Stuck on You (2004) (with Cait London, Wendy Rosnau)
- Three Weddings and a Giggle (2006) (with Karen Ball, Liz Curtis Higgs)

== See also ==
List of romantic novelists
