= Michele Bardsley =

American novelist (born 1970)

Michele Bardsley is the pen name of Michele Freeman (born Michele Renee Vail on January 21, 1970, in Tulsa, Oklahoma) who is an American writer of paranormal and contemporary romantic fiction. Bardsley is a New York Times and USA Today bestselling author and has published more than 40 novels, novellas, short stories, and articles since the publication of her first book in 1999. She has written young adult paranormal fiction under Michele Vail. She lives in Texas with her husband, four dogs, and two cats.

== Biography ==
Bardsley received her first publishing contract in 1998 from pioneer electronic publisher, Hard Shell Word Factory, for her romantic comedy, Daddy In Training (out-of-print). She's had numerous short stories, novellas, and novels published by electronic, independent, and traditional publishers. Her novel, Because Your Vampire Said So (Signet Eclipse, 2008), received the 2008 RT Reviewer's Choice Award for Best Vampire Romance.

Over the years, her work has earned awards and recognition from many organizations and publications. A few include: “A Mother Scorned” won the Grand Prize in the 72nd Annual Writer’s Digest Writing Competition; Love Gone Wild (formerly published as Wild Women) received OWFI's coveted trophy award for Best Book of Fiction and FWA's Royal Palm Award for Best Romance Novel; and A Demon is a Girl’s Best Friend was awarded Crème de la Crème from the Oklahoma Writer's Federation, Inc. Bardsley's poetry, nonfiction, and short-short fiction have received awards and recognition from Northwoods Journal, Tulsa Community College, Byline Magazine, Scribe & Quill, Oklahoma State University, Amazing Instant Novelist, OWFI, Writer's Bloc, Writer's Digest, and WriteLink.

== Selected works ==
=== Broken Heart Series ===
1. I'm The Vampire, That's Why (Signet Eclipse, 2006)
2. Don't Talk Back To Your Vampire (Signet Eclipse, 2007)
3. Because Your Vampire Said So (Signet Eclipse, 2008)
4. Wait Till Your Vampire Gets Home (Signet Eclipse, 2008)
5. Over My Dead Body (Signet Eclipse, 2009)
6. Come Hell or High Water (Signet Eclipse, 2010)
7. Cross Your Heart (Signet Eclipse, 2010)
8. Must Love Lycans (Signet Eclipse, 2011)
9. Only Lycans Need Apply (Signet Eclipse, 2013)
10. Broken Heart Tails (Freeman Publications, 2014)
11. Some Lycan Hot (Freeman Publications, 2015)
12. You'll Understand When You're Dead (Freeman Publications, 2015)
13. Lycan On the Edge (Freeman Publications, 2015)
14. Your Lycan or Mine? (2017)

=== Broken Heart Holidays ===
1. Valentine's Day Sucks
2. Harry Little, Leprechaun
3. A Zombie for Christmas

=== The Pack Rules Series ===
1. The Werewolf's Bride
2. The Werewolf Bodyguard
3. Two Alphas and a Lady
4. Bear Witness
5. A Five Pack of Shifter Romances (Collection of Novellas)
6. The Dragon's Wife
7. Bear Winter

=== Deed Brothers Series ===
1. A Damned Deed
2. A Christmas Deed
3. A Dirty Deed

=== Wizards of Nevermore Series ===
1. Never Again (Signet Eclipse, 2011)
2. Never Say Never (Signet Eclipse, 2012)
3. Never Say Die (Signet Eclipse, 2017)

=== Violetta Graves Series ===
1. In Good Spirits
2. A Spirited Defense
3. Getting in the Spirit

=== Frisky Romance Series ===
1. Frisky Business
2. Frisky Summer
3. Frisky Threesome

=== Holiday Bites Series ===
1. Holiday Bites (Collection): Christmas for Eve, Candy for Valentine, and Treats for Trixie
2. Fireworks for July

=== Wolves on the Prowl (Completed Series) ===
1. A Wild Ride
2. Wild Threesome
3. Blood Wild
4. Wild Darkness
5. Going Wild (Omnibus)

=== Single Titles ===
- Heart of Magic
- Love Gone Wild

=== Short stories ===
- A Mother Scorned
- A Demon is a Girl's Best Friend
- Diana the Zombie

=== The Reaper Diaries (written as Michele Vail) ===
1. Undeadly
2. Unchosen
3. Unbroken

== See also ==
- List of Romance Novelists
