= Tanya Anne Crosby =

American writer of romance novels

- Born: June 5, 1962 (age 64); Rota, Spain
- Occupation: Novelist
- Writing career
- Period: 1992–present
- Genre: Romance
- Website: www.tanyaannecrosby.com

Tanya Anne Crosby (born June 5, 1962) is a Spanish-American writer of romance novels. She is a five-time nominee for a Romantic Times Career Achievement Award. Her novels have been translated into Spanish, Italian, French, Russian and Chinese.

== Personal life ==
Tanya Anne Crosby was born on June 5, 1962, in Rota in Andalusia, Spain. Her mother is Spanish and her father an American military. She grew up as a military brat with disparity in cultures.

Crosby is married and has two children. She resides in Traverse City, Michigan.

== Writing career ==
Crosby published her first romance novel "Angel of fire" in 1992 for Avon Books. She has written numerous novels and her books have been translated into eight languages: Russian, Italian, Chinese, French, German, Spanish, Dutch and Portuguese.

Her fifth historical romance, Once Upon a Kiss, launched the Avon Romantic Treasures line.

After a 10-year hiatus, she returned with her first contemporary romantic suspense for Kensington. Speak No Evil, her first romantic suspense novel was released in 2013. She returned to the genre with a brand-new historical series, entitled The Guardians of the Stone. Crosby's first title for The Story Plant is titled THE GIRL WHO STAYED and will be released April 2016.

Crosby has now written for The Story Plant, Kensington Publishing, Harlequin, and Avon Books/Harper Collins, where her fifth book Once Upon a Kiss launched the Avon Romantic Treasures line.

== Bibliography ==
=== Single Novels ===
1. ANGEL OF FIRE; Avon Books, Apr 1992
2. SAGEBRUSH BRIDE; Avon Books, Jun 1993
3. VIKING'S PRIZE; Avon Books, Apr 1994
4. A CHRISTMAS TOGETHER; Avon Books, Oct 1994
5. ONCE UPON A KISS; Avon Books, Feb 1, 1995
6. KISSED; Avon Books, Dec 1, 1995
7. THE MACKINNON'S BRIDE; Avon Books, Jun 1, 1996
8. MARRIED AT MIDNIGHT; Avon Books, Sep 1996
9. LYON'S GIFT; Avon Books, Jun 1, 1997
10. PERFECT IN MY SIGHT; Avon Books, May 1, 1998
11. ON BENDED KNEE; Avon Books, Jan 1, 1999
12. HAPPILY EVER AFTER;Avon Books, Nov 9, 1999
13. LION HEART; Avon Books, 2000
14. THE IMPOSTOR'S KISS; Harlequin Books, Dec 2003
15. THE IMPOSTOR PRINCE; Harlequin Books Sep 2006
16. SPEAK NO EVIL; Kensington Books Mar 2013
17. TELL NO LIES; Kensington Books Mar 2014
18. HIGHLAND FIRE; Oliver-Heber Books Jan 2014
19. HIGHLAND STEEL; Oliver-Heber Books Oct 2014
20. HIGHLAND STORM; Oliver-Heber Books Dec 2015
21. THE WINTER STONE; Oliver-Heber Books April 2014
22. THE GIRL WHO STAYED; The Story Plant April 2016

=== Novellas ===
1. LADY'S MAN; Oliver-Heber Books, April 2012
2. HIGHLAND SONG; Oliver-Heber Books, 2013
3. ONCE UPON A HIGHLAND LEGEND;Oliver-Heber Books, d 2014
4. MISCHIEF & MISTLETOE; Oliver-Heber Books, 2013
5. MACKINNONS' HOPE; Oliver-Heber Books, Oct 2015

=== MacKinnon-Brodie Saga Series ===
1. The MacKinnon's Bride, Avon Books 1996/Jun
2. Lion's Gift, Avon Books, 1997/Jun
3. One Bended Knee, Avon Books, 1999/Ene
4. Lion Heart, Avon Books, 2000/Jul

=== The Impostors Series ===
1. The Impostor Kiss, Harlequin Enterprises, 2003/Dec
2. The Impostor Prince, Harlequin Enterprises, 2006/Sep

=== Anthologies in collaboration ===
- "Heaven's Gate" in A Christmas Together (with Jane Bonander, Jennifer Horsman and Joan Johnston), Avon Books, 1994/Oct
- "A kiss After Midnight" in Married at Midnight (with Kathleen E. Woodiwiss, Jo Beverley, and Samantha James) Avon Books, 1996/Sep
