= Phoebe Conn =

American novelist (born 1941)

Phoebe Jane Conn
- Born: 1941 (age 84–85); California
- Education: University of Arizona; California State University, Los Angeles (BA, MA)
- Occupation: Novelist
- Writing career
- Pen name: Phoebe Conn, Cinnamon Burke
- Period: 1983–present
- Genre: Romance
- Website: www.phoebeconn.com

Phoebe Conn (born 1941 in California) is the maiden name and pseudonym of Phoebe Jane Conn, a best-selling American author of over thirty romance novels. She has also published one novel under the pseudonym Cinnamon Burke.

== Biography ==
Phoebe Jane Conn was born in 1941 in California. She studied art at the University of Arizona, and graduated from California State University Los Angeles with a B.A. in art history, an Elementary Teaching Credential, and later, an MA in education. After graduation, Conn taught for many years.

Long an avid reader, Conn credits a Ricardo Montalbán commercial for Silhouette Romances for inspiring her to write her first book. Once the decision had been made, Conn outlined dozens of published romance novels to better understand how the genre was structured.

== Bibliography ==
=== Novels ===
- Tender Savage (1983)
- Captive Heart (1983)
- Love's Elusive Flame (1983)
- Savage Fire (1984)
- Ecstasy's Paradise (1984)
- Savage Storm (1985)
- Loving Fury (1986)
- Emerald Fire (1987)
- Starlit Ecstasy (1987)
- Arizona Angel (1988)
- Hearts of Gold (1988)
- Beyond the Stars (1988)
- By Love Enslaved (1989)
- No Sweeter Ecstasy (1990)
- Tempt Me With Kisses (1991)
- Love Me 'Til Dawn (1992)
- Desire (1993)
- Tangled Hearts (1993)
- Starfire (1994)
- Swept Away (1994)
- Beloved (1994)
- Apache Caress (1994)
- Paradise (1995)
- Ring of Fire (1995) (writing as Cinnamon Burke)
- Beloved Legacy (1996)
- A Touch of Love (1997)
- Forbidden Legacy (1998)
- Wild Legacy (1999)
- Wild Desire (2003)
- Midnight Blue (2006)
- "Mango Summer (2008)
- "Dawn of Desire (2008)

=== Omnibus ===
- A Bride's Temptation (1992) (with Kathleen Drymon and Susan Sackett)
- A Christmas Kiss: Six Holiday Love Stories (1992) (with Caroline Bourne and Kathleen Drymon)
- To Love and to Honor (1995) (with Colleen Faulkner, Debra Hamilton and Victoria Thompson)
- Baby Dreams (1996) (with Barbara Benedict, Carol Finch, Jo Goodman, Hannah Howell and Jane Kidder)
- Snow Angels (1999) (with Cherie Claire and Victoria Dark)
- Lovescape (2004) (with Anne Avery, Sandra Hill and Dara Joy)
