= Barbara Andrews =

Barbara Andrews may refer to:

- Barbara Andrews (novelist), American writer of romance novels
- Barbara Andrews (bishop), Anglican Canadian bishop
- Barbara Andrews (Lutheran pastor), American Lutheran pastor.
