= Tom E. Huff =

American author

Thomas Elmer Huff
- Born: Thomas Elmer Huff; January 8, 1938; Tarrant County, Texas, U.S.
- Died: January 16, 1990 (aged 52); Fort Worth, Texas, U.S.
- Occupations: Teacher, novelist
- Writing career
- Pen name: Edwina Marlow; Beatrice Parker; T. E. Huff; Katherine St. Clair; Jennifer Wilde; Tom E. Huff
- Period: 1968–1989
- Genres: gothic fiction, romance

Thomas Elmer Huff (January 8, 1938 – January 16, 1990) was a best-selling American author of 23 gothic and romance novels as T. E. Huff and Tom E. Huff and under the female pen names Edwina Marlow, Beatrice Parker, Katherine St. Clair, and Jennifer Wilde.

== Careers ==
Thomas Elmer Huff was born on January 8, 1938, in Tarrant County, Texas, United States. He graduated from Poly High School and from Texas Wesleyn College in 1960. He spent several years as English teacher at R. L. Paschal High School before becoming a novelist.

He wrote gothic novels for nine years under the pseudonyms Edwina Marlow, Beatrice Parker, T. E. Huff, and Katherine St. Clair. In 1976, Huff adopted the pseudonym Jennifer Wilde when he began writing historical romance novels. His first release, Love's Tender Fury, had 41 printings in its first five years, and his second historical romance, Dare to Love, spent 11 weeks on The New York Times paperback bestseller list. His historical romances were noted for being written in first person, from the heroine's perspective. Many of his books also featured multiple male protagonists, and "the man who first captures the heroine's heart isn't always the one who ends up with it."

Huff earned a Career Achievement Award in 1987–1988 from Romantic Times.

Huff died suddenly of a massive heart failure on 16 January 1990 in Fort Worth, Texas, where he was buried.

== Bibliography ==
Some of his novels are reedited under the pseudonym of Jennifer Wilde or under different titles.

=== As Edwina Marlow ===
==== Single novels ====
- The Master of Phoenix Hall (1968)
- Falconridge (1969)
- When Emmalyn Remembers (1970)
- The Lady of Lyon House (1970)
- Danger At Dahlkari (1975)
- Midnight At Mallyncourt (1975)

=== As Beatrice Parker ===
==== Single novels ====
- Come to Castlemoor (1970)
- Betrayal At Blackcrest (1971)
- Stranger By the Lake (1971)
- Wherever Lynn Goes (1975)
- Jamintha (1975)

=== As T. E. Huff ===
==== Single novels ====
- Nine Bucks Row (1973) aka Susannah, Beware
- Meet a Dark Stranger (1974) aka Whisper in the Darkness

=== As Katherine St. Clair ===
==== Single novel ====
- Room Beneath the Stairs (1975)

=== As Jennifer Wilde ===
==== Marietta Danver Trilogy ====
1. Love's Tender Fury (1976)
2. Love Me, Marietta (1981)
3. When Love Commands (1984)

==== Single novels ====
- Dare to Love (1978)
- Once More, Miranda (1983)
- Angel in Scarlet (1986)
- The Slipper (1987)
- They Call Her Dana (1989)

=== As Tom E. Huff ===
==== Single novel ====
- Marabelle (1980)

== See also ==
List of romantic novelists
