= Patricia Kay =

American novelist

Patricia Ann Kay
- Born: March 7, 1937 (age 89); Ohio, United States
- Occupation: Novelist
- Children: 3
- Writing career
- Pen name: Ann Patrick; Trisha Alexander; Patricia Kay
- Language: English
- Period: 1990 - present
- Genre: Romance
- Website: www.patriciakay.com

Patricia Ann Kay (born March 7, 1937), also known as Trisha Alexander and Ann Patrick, is an American bestselling author of romance novels and women's fiction. She has authored more than 50 books, with four million copies published in 18 countries.

== Biography ==
Kay was born and raised in northeastern Ohio with her three younger sisters. She has lived in New York, California, Alabama and Stockholm, Sweden and, since 1969, has lived in Houston, Texas. She has three grown children.

Her books have been on the USA Today Bestseller lists and have also been best-sellers in Sweden. She was a finalist for a Romance Writers of America RITA Award, the highest honor bestowed on a romance novelist, in 2000 in the category Contemporary Single Title, for her novel The Wrong Child.

Kay is also an acclaimed teacher of writing. She teaches a variety of online writing classes including a series of novel writing classes which are all listed on her website.

== Bibliography ==
=== As Ann Patrick ===
==== Single novels ====
- Opening Act (1990)
- Hearts Collide (1991)
- For Services Rendered (1991)
- Betting on Love (1992)

=== As Trisha Alexander ===
==== Single novels ====
- Cinderella Girl (1990)
- Say You Love Me (1993)
- What Will the Children Think? (1994)
- Let's Make It Legal (1994)
- The Real Elizabeth Hollister.... (1995)
- The Girl Next Door (1995)
- The Constant Heart (1996)
- Substitute Bride (1997)
- With This Wedding Ring (1998)
- A Mother for Jeffrey (1999)

==== When Cantrell Family Series ====
1. When Somebody Loves (1992)
2. When Somebody Needs You (1992)
3. When Somebody Wants You (1993)

==== The Groom Series ====
1. Here Comes the Groom (1993)
2. Mother of the Groom (1993)

==== Three Brides & a Baby Series ====
1. A Bride for Luke (1996)
2. A Bride for John (1996)
3. A Baby for Rebecca (1996)
4. Stop the Wedding! (1997)

==== Callahans & Kin Series ====
1. Wedding Bells and Mistletoe (1999)
2. Falling for an Older Man (2000)

=== As Patricia Kay ===
==== Single novels ====
- Comfort and Joy (1997)
- The Wrong Child (2000)
- The Other Woman (2001)
- Family Album (2002)
- Secrets of a Small Town (2003)
- Man of the Hour (2004)
- Come October (2005)
- Which End Is Up? (2006)
- Wish Come True (2007)
- His Brother's Bride-to-Be (2009)
- Wrong Groom, Right Bride (2010)
- Meet Mr. Prince(2011)

==== Callahans & Kin Series ====
3. Just a Small-town Girl (2001)
4. Annie and the Confirmed Bachelor (2003)

==== Callie's Corner Cafe Series ====
1. A Perfect Life (2006)
2. It Runs in the Family (2006)
3. She's the One (2006)

==== The Hathaways of Morgan Creek Series ====
1. Nanny in Hiding (2004)
2. His Best Friend (2005)
3. You've Got Game (2005)

==== Stockwells of Texas Multi-Author Series ====
4. The Millionaire and the Mom (2001)

==== Secret Lives of Society WivesMulti-Author Series ====
3. The One-Week Wife (2006)

==== Stockwells of Texas Multi-Author Series ====
3. The Billionaire and His Boss (2008)

==== Omnibus ====
- A Long Road Home (2003) (with Allison Leigh)
- Baby on the Way / Counting on a Cowboy / Secrets of a Small Town (2004) (with Marie Ferrarella and Karen Sandler)
- Cowboy on Her Trail / Man of the Hour (2004) (with Janis Reams Hudson)
- Devil You Know / Nanny in Hiding (2004) (with Laurie Paige)
- She's the One / Call Me Cowboy (2006) (with Judy Duarte)
- One-Week Wife / Bought-and-Paid-for Wife (2007) (with Bronwyn Jameson)

== See also ==
- List of romantic novelists
- List of novelists from the United States
