= Susan Andersen =

American writer (born 1950)

- Born: 1950 (age 75–76); United States
- Occupation: Novelist
- Writing career
- Period: 1989–present
- Genres: Romance, suspense
- Website: www.susanandersen.com

Signature
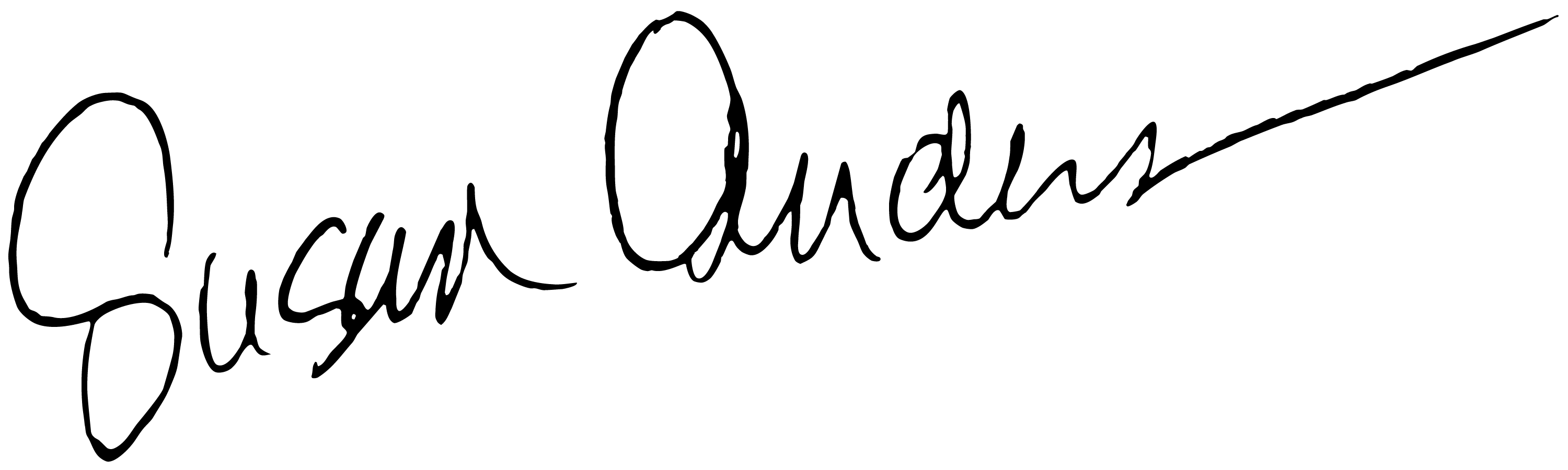

Susan Andersen (born 1950) is an American writer of romance novels since 1989.

== Biography ==
Born in 1950, Andersen was raised in Seattle, Washington with her two older brothers. She trained as a dental assistant, although she did not like working for dentists. After she turned 30, Andersen felt that she might have the "life experience to string an entire book together." Her first novel, Shadow Dance was published in 1989.

Her novels are known for being funny as well as containing "sexy sizzle and great characterization." She has been nominated three times for Romantic Times Magazine's Reviewers' Choice Awards, winning in 1998 for Baby, I'm Yours. She is a New York Times, USAToday, and Publishers Weekly best seller and has also been named a Romantic Times Career Achievement Award winner. She has appeared ten times on the list of 10 novels picked as Amazon.com Editor's Choice. Her novel Coming Undone was nominated for a RITA award.

== Bibliography ==
=== Single novels ===
- Shadow Dance 1989/09
- Present Danger 1993/02
- Obsessed 1993/10
- On Thin Ice 1995/08
- Exposure 1996/04
- Baby, I'm Yours 1998/05
- Be My Baby 1999/03
- Baby, Don't Go 2000/05
- All Shook Up 2001/05
- Burning Up 2010
- Running Wild 2015
- Notorious 2016
- It Had to Be You 2017
- The Ballad of Hattie Taylor 2021 (Andersen's only historical romance)

=== Marines Series ===
1. Head Over Heels 2002/01
2. Getting Lucky 2003/03
3. Hot and Bothered 2004/08
4. Coming Undone 2007/08

=== Las Vegas' showgirls Series ===
1. Skintight 2005/07
2. Just for Kicks 2006/08

=== The Sisterhood Diaries Series ===
1. Cutting Loose 2008/08
2. Bending the Rules 2009
3. Playing Dirty 2011
4. Running Wild 2015

=== Razor Bay/Bradshaw Brothers Series ===
1. That Thing Called Love 2012
2. Some Like It Hot 2013
3. No Strings Attached 2014

== See also ==
- List of romantic novelists
