= Anne Mallory =

American novelist

- Born: Michigan, United States
- Occupation: Novelist
- Writing career
- Genres: Historical Romance, Mystery
- Website: www.annemallory.com

Anne Mallory is an American author of historical romance novels. Her books blend romance and mystery. Her name is a pseudonym.

== Biography ==
Mallory submitted her first manuscript, Masquerading the Marquess, for consideration for the 2003 Romance Writers of America Golden Heart Award, given to a previously unpublished author. The book was a finalist in the competition and caught the attention of one of the judges, an editor from Avon. The editor purchased the book, which was released in October 2004. This debut novel was later nominated for a Romantic Times Reviewers' Choice Award for Best First Historical Romance.

Her style of writing has been likened to that of Amanda Quick, blending mystery and romances in a Regency setting. Romantic Times described her first novel as "lively, exciting, cleverly plotted" with an "independent, intelligent heroine and equally smart hero."

Born in Michigan, Mallory now lives in California.

As of January 2013, the author went on hiatus from historical romance in order to write in a different genre under a different name.

== Books ==
- In Total Surrender (October 2011)
- One Night Is Never Enough (March 2011)
- Seven Secrets of Seduction (June 2010)
- For The Earl's Pleasure (July 2009)
- The Bride Price (November 2008)
- Three Nights of Sin (April 2008)
- What Isabella Desires (August 2007)
- The Earl of Her Dreams (November 2006)
- The Viscount's Wicked Ways (April 2006)
- Daring the Duke (August 2005)
- Masquerading the Marquess (Oct 2004)

== Awards ==
- Finalist for RWA Golden Heart Award for Masquerading the Marquess
- USA Today best selling books top 150, through Sunday May 4, 2008
- Finalist for RWA RITA award for Regency Historical Romances for Three Nights of Sin
- Finalist for RWA RITA award for Paranormal Romances for For the Earl's Pleasure

== See also ==
- List of romantic novelists
