= Tina St. John =

American writer

- Born: 1966 (age 59–60); Michigan, United States
- Occupation: Novelist
- Writing career
- Pen name: Tina St. John, Lara Adrian
- Language: English
- Period: 1995-present
- Genre: Romance
- Website: tinastjohn.com

Tina St. John (born 1966 in Michigan, United States), is an author of historical and paranormal romance novels. As Tina St. John she wrote seven historical romances, and under the pseudonym Lara Adrian she currently writes the New York Times and #1 internationally bestselling Midnight Breed vampire series of paranormal romances, published by Random House Books.

== Biography ==
Tina St. John was born on 1967 in Michigan, USA. She is a descendant of Mayflower passenger Governor William Bradford. She currently resides with her husband in coastal New England.

She left a career in corporate administration to become a full-time writer in 1995, and sold her first-completed novel to Ballantine (Random House) in January 1998. She signs her historical romances as Tina St. John, and her popular series of vampires, Midnight Breed, under the pseudonym Lara Adrian. Her seven out-of-print historical romance novels were reissued in 2012 by the author as independently published ebooks and trade paperbacks.

Past recognitions include being awarded "Bestselling Debut Author of 2007" from Borders Books for Kiss of Midnight and "One of Amazon.com's Top 10 Best Romance Novels of 2007" with Midnight Awakening.

Her writing influences include Bram Stoker and Anne Rice.

== Bibliography ==
=== As Tina St. John ===
==== Debut novel (stand-alone story) ====
- Lord of Vengeance (June 1999; reissued by author March 2012)

==== Warrior Trilogy (in reading order) ====
1. White Lion's Lady (August 2001; reissued by author May 2012)
2. Black Lion's Bride (May 2002; reissued by author May 2012)
3. Lady of Valor (April 2000; reissued by author May 2012)

==== Dragon Chalice Series (paranormal historical romance) ====
1. Heart of the Hunter (June 2004; reissued by author March 2012)
2. Heart of the Flame (March 2005; reissued by author March 2012)
3. Heart of the Dove (December 2005; reissued by author March 2012)
4. Heart of the Dragon (uncontracted; forthcoming TBA)

=== As Lara Adrian ===
==== The Midnight Breed series ====
1. Kiss of Midnight (May 1, 2007, ISBN 978-0-553-58937-5)
2. Kiss of Crimson (May 29, 2007, ISBN 978-0-553-58938-2)
3. Midnight Awakening (November 27, 2007, ISBN 978-0-553-58939-9)
4. Midnight Rising (March 25, 2008, ISBN 978-0-440-24444-8)
5. Veil of Midnight (December 30, 2008, ISBN 978-0-440-24449-3)
6. Ashes of Midnight (May 26, 2009, ISBN 978-0-440-24450-9)
7. Shades of Midnight (December 29, 2009, ISBN 978-0-440-24526-1)
8. Taken by Midnight (September 28, 2010, ISBN 978-0-440-24527-8)
9. Deeper Than Midnight (June 28, 2011, ISBN 978-0-440-24611-4)
10. A Taste of Midnight (December 5, 2011, ISBN 978-0-345-53259-6) [novella]
11. Darker After Midnight (January 24, 2012, ISBN 978-0-345-53087-5)
12. Edge of Dawn (February 26, 2013, ISBN 978-0-345-53260-2)
13. The Midnight Breed Series Companion (P.B - June 26, 2013, ISBN 978-1-939193-92-6, E-Book - May 29, 2013 ISBN 978-1-939193-91-9)
14. Marked by Midnight
15. Crave the Night (January 16, 2014, ISBN 978-1780335773)
16. Tempted by Midnight - 1001 Dark Nights
17. Bound to Darkness (November 17, 2015, ISBN 978-1494596859)
18. Stroke of Midnight - 1001 Dark Nights
19. Defy the Dawn
20. Claimed in Shadows
21. Break the Day

==== Midnight Breed Novella ====
- A Touch of Midnight ebook (December 5, 2011)
