= Lecia Cornwall =

Canadian author of romantic fiction

- Born: c. 1960 (age 65–66); Toronto, Ontario, Canada
- Occupation: Author
- Writing career
- Language: English
- Period: 2011–present
- Genre: Historical fiction
- Subject: Regency era
- Website: leciacornwall.com

Lecia Cornwall (born c. 1960 ) is a Canadian author of romantic fiction. Her works have primarily featured the Regency era.

== Early life ==
Lecia Cornwall was born in Toronto, Ontario. She became interested in history after watching the miniseries The Six Wives of Henry VIII at the age of ten, which prompted her to begin reading about the Plantagenets and the Tudors, as well as fairy tales. Years later, after staying home to raise her children, Cornwall decided to begin writing fiction, with a focus on medieval historical romance. To learn how to write a novel, she read as many medieval romances as possible at her local library, including works by Jo Beverley, Philippa Gregory, Jude Deveraux, and Julie Garwood. Having exhausted the library's offerings on the subject, Cornwall discovered Bernard Cornwell's "dashing, brave, tormented, inspiring hero" Richard Sharpe, who interested her in reading other Regency-era fiction by such authors as Mary Balogh, Julia Quinn, and Eloisa James. She also read non-fiction works on the era. Cornwall considers the Regency period to be

"One of history's most fascinating eras. Not only do you have the English aristocracy at its peak, complete with titles, grand homes, art and the most baffling code of social behavior ever, you have the sweeping backdrop of great world events — soldiers marching to war, the rise and fall of nations, the changes brought about by the Industrial Revolution, and new ideas in practically every field, from fashion to fiction."

== Writing career ==
Cornwall's writing career began in 2009, when she learned that one of her manuscripts had attracted a literary agent wishing to represent her. This manuscript became Cornwall's debut novel, Secrets of a Proper Countess, which was published by Avon Books in 2011. Set in the Regency period, it follows the widowed Countess Isobel Maitland, who is kept as a virtual prisoner by her husband's family until she meets Lord Blackwood, a known scoundrel who is secretly a government spy. A lover of fairy tales, Cornwall approached the story as a hybrid of Cinderella and The Scarlet Pimpernel. Publishers Weekly stated that the novel had "just the right blend of mystery, manners, and passion," with "truly nefarious villains, plenty of action, and a dash of glamour" that made it "a seductive read."

Avon Books published her novella, All the Pleasures of the Season, in 2011. One of Cornwall's first Regency story drafts was later published in 2012 as How to Deceive a Duke. Publishers Weekly opined that the chemistry of the novel's two protagonists "will draw the reader into a fast-paced novel that travels from the English countryside and London to the battle of Waterloo." In 2013, Avon published her sixth work, Once Upon a Highland Summer.

== Works ==
- Secrets of a Proper Countess (2011)
- The Price of Temptation (2011)
- All the Pleasures of the Season (2012)
- How to Deceive a Duke (2012)
- The Secret Life of Lady Julia (2013)
- Once Upon a Highland Season series

- Once Upon a Highland Summer (2013)
- Once Upon a Highland Autumn (2014)
- Once Upon a Highland Christmas (2014)

- What a Lady Most Desires (2014)
