= Carla Cassidy =

American novelist

Carla Bracale Cassidy
- Born: Carla Bracale; Unknown; Kansas, U.S.
- Occupation: Novelist
- Spouse: Frank Cassidy
- Children: 1
- Writing career
- Pen name: Carla Cassidy, Carla Cook
- Period: 1988–present
- Genre: Romance

Carla Cassidy, née Carla Bracale (born in Kansas, U.S.) is an American writer of over 80 romance novels since 1988. She initially signed her novels as Carla Bracale (her maiden name); now as Carla Cassidy (her married name). She also penned a fantasy novel as Carla Cook.

== Biography ==
Cassidy grew up in a very small town in Kansas, U.S., where her father was an educator to children.

She has been a professional cheerleader, an actress, and a singer-dancer in a show band before settling into writing.

Carla married Frank Cassidy and they had a daughter; they live in Kansas. She has published more that 160 books starting in 1988.

== Bibliography ==
=== Carla Bracale ===
==== First Kiss Series ====
3. Falling For You (1988)
6. Fair-Weather Love (1989)

==== Sweet Dreams Series Muli-Author ====
- My Dream Guy (1989)
- Dream Date (1989)
- Puppy Love (1991)
- Down With Love (1991)

==== Single Novels ====
- joseph luzada (1992)

=== Carla Cassidy ===
==== Born in the USA series Multi-Author ====
- Patchwork Family (1991)

==== Single novels ====
- Fire and Spice (1992)
- Whatever Alex Wants (1992)
- Homespun Hearts (1992)
- Golden Girl (1993)
- A Fleeting Moment (1993)
- Something New (1993)
- Heart of the Beast (1993)
- Pixie Dust (1993)
- The Littlest Matchmaker (1993)
- Fugitive Father (1994)
- Under the Boardwalk (1994)
- The Marriage Scheme (1994)
- Try to Remember (1994)
- Anything for Danny (1994)
- Mystery Child (1996)
- Mom in the Making (1996)
- Deputy Daddy (1996)
- Passion in the First Degree (1996)
- An Impromptu Proposal (1996)
- Daddy on the Run (1996)
- Pop Goes the Question (1997)
- Pregnant With His Child (1997)
- Their Only Child (1997)
- Will You Give My Mommy a Baby? (1998)
- Lost in His Arms (2001) translated on Russian in 2003 famous Russian writer Valery Terekhin as "Долгая дорога к счастью" ("Long way to happiness") and published in "Raduga"
- Just One Kiss (2001)
- In a Heartbeat (2001)
- Born of Passion (2001)
- Get Blondie (2004)
- Promise Him Anything (2004)
- The Perfect Family (2005)
- Are You Afraid? (2006)
- Without a Sound (2006)
- Hell on Heels (2006)
- A Forbidden Passion (2006)
- The Bodyguard's Promise (2006)
- Paint It Red (2007)
- His New Nanny (2007)
- Every Move You Make (2008)
- Pregnesia (2009)

==== Dreamscapes: Whispers of Love series Multi-Author ====
- Swamp Secrets (1993)
- Silent Screams (1994)

==== Loop Series ====
2. Getting It Right: Jessica (1994)

==== Lawman Lovers series Multi-Author ====
- Behind Closed Doors (1997)

==== Cheyenne Nights series ====
1. Midnight Wishes (1997)
2. Sunrise Vows (1997)
3. Sunset Promises (1997)

==== Reluctant Sisters series Multi-Author ====
- Reluctant Dad (1998)
- Reluctant Wife (1998)

==== Lost and Found series Multi-Author ====
- Father's Love (1998)

==== Mustang, Montana series ====
1. Code Name Cowboy (1998)
2. Her Counterfeit Husband (1998)
3. Rodeo Dad (1999)
4. Wife for a Week (1999)
5. Imminent Danger (2000)

==== Royally Wed series Multi-Author ====
- The Princess's White Knight (1999)
- An Officer and a Princess (2001)

==== Virgin Brides series Multi-Author ====
- Waiting for the Wedding (2000)

==== Against All Odds series Multi-Author ====
- One of the Good Guys (2000)

==== Year of Loving Dangerously series Multi-Author ====
- Strangers When We Married (2000)

==== Delaney Heirs series ====
1. Man on a Mission (2001)
2. Once Forbidden... (2001)
3. To Wed and Protect (2002)
4. Out of Exile (2002)

==== Coltons series Multi-Author ====
- Pregnant in Prosperino (2002)

==== Tale of the Sea series Multi-Author ====
- More Than Meets the Eye (2002)

==== Lone Star Country Club series Multi-Author ====
- Promised to a Sheikh (2002)

==== Romancing the Crown series Multi-Author ====
- Secrets of a Pregnant Princess (2002)

==== Soulmates series Multi-Author ====
- A Gift from the Past (2003)

==== The Pregnancy Test series ====
1. What If I'm Pregnant...? (2003)
2. If the Stick Turns Pink... (2003)

==== Cherokee Corners series ====
- Dead Certain (2003)
- Last Seen... (2003)
- Trace Evidence (2003)
- Manhunt (2004)

==== Marrying the Boss's Daughter series Multi-Author ====
- Rules of Engagement (2004)

==== Athena Force Multi-Author series ====
7. Deceived (2005)
16. Pawn (2006)

==== Wild West Bodyguards series Multi-Author ====
- Defending the Rancher's Daughter (2005)
- Protecting the Princess (2005)
- The Bodyguard's Return (2007)
- Safety In Numbers (2007)

==== Omnibus in collaboration ====
- Shadows '93 (1993) (with Lori Herter and Kathleen Korbel)
- Beautiful Stranger (2001) (with Heather Graham) (The Last Cavalier / Mystery Child)
- To Wed a Royal (2002) (with Valerie Parv)
- Trace Evidence / Tie That Binds (2004) (with Laura Gale)
- Manhunt / Joint Forces (2004) (with Catherine Mann)
- In the Dark / Get Blondie - Intimate (2004) (with Heather Graham)
- Hot Pursuit (2005) (with Karen Rose and Annie Solomon)
- Whirlwind Weddings (2005) (with Allison Leigh)
- Defending the Rancher's Daughter / In Dark Waters (2005) (with Mary Burton)

=== As Carla Cook ===
==== Single novels ====
- The Magician (2002)
