= Michelle Jerott =

American writer of romance novels (1961–2021)

- Born: January 17, 1961
- Died: July 5, 2021 (aged 60)
- Education: University of Michigan
- Occupation: Novelist
- Writing career
- Pen name: Michelle Jerott, Michele Albert
- Period: 1997–2021
- Genre: Romance
- Website: www.inkalicious.com

Michelle Jerott (January 17, 1961 – July 5, 2021) was an American writer of romance novels. She wrote under both her real name and her pen name, Michele Albert. She won a Golden Heart Award, was nominated by Romantic Times for "Best Mainstream Novel" twice, and appeared on the Waldenbook's National Bestseller List. She was a member of the Authors Guild and Novelists, Inc.

== Biography ==
=== Personal life ===
Michelle Jerott obtained a degree in classical archaeology from the University of Michigan. Before writing, she worked as archaeologist. She became a mother and went to work in a research lab, which allowed her time to write.

Michelle lived with her husband in a small town outside Madison, Wisconsin.

=== Writing career ===
Her first book, Absolute Trouble, won the Romance Writers of America's 1997 Golden Heart Award for best unpublished contemporary romance. She published her first four books under her name, Michelle Jerott, and later she decided to use the pen name Michele Albert to create a series, "Avalon Investigations", that also was related to her debut book. Her Bodyguard and Getting Her Man were both nominated for Best Mainstream Novel by Romantic Times. Off Limits appeared on the Waldenbook's National Bestseller List.

== Awards ==
- Absolute Trouble, her first book, won the Romance Writers of America's 1997 Golden Heart Award for best unpublished contemporary romance
- Her Bodyguard was nominated for Best Mainstream Novel by Romantic Times
- Getting Her Man was nominated for Best Mainstream Novel by Romantic Times
- Off Limits appeared on the Waldenbook's National Bestseller List

== Bibliography ==
=== As Michelle Jerott ===
==== Single novels ====
- All Night Long, 1999/Jan
- A Great Catch, 2000/Sep
- Her Bodyguard, 2001/Jan

=== As Michele Albert ===
==== Avalon Investigations Series ====
1. Absolute Trouble, 1998/Sep (as Michelle Jerott)
2. Tough Enough 2007/Mar
3. Getting Her Man, 2002/Oct
4. Off Limits, 2003/Sep
5. One Way Out, 2005/Mar
6. Hide in Plain Sight, 2006/May
7. Her Last Chance 2008/Apr
