= Shana Abé =

American author of romance novels

- Born: Texas, U.S.
- Occupation: Novelist
- Writing career
- Period: 1998–present
- Genres: Romance, Fantasy
- Website: www.shanaabe.com

Shana Abé is an American author of romance novels. She is a past winner of the Romantic Times Career Achievement Award and has won numerous Romantic Times Reviewers' Choice Awards.

== Biography ==
Shana Abé was born in Texas. She spent much of her childhood living in Colorado, with a brief stint in Mexico as a foreign exchange student, and, at age seventeen, lived in Japan as a model. Throughout her childhood, Abé wrote, completing what she calls "The Silliest Romance Novel Ever" during her free time during modeling shoots. Her writing focused on romance, as those were the types of books that she most enjoyed reading. She later attended college in Los Angeles, graduating with a degree in drama.

Her second novel, also a contemporary romance, took third place in a writing contest. She sent the book to several prospective agents, many of which responded with questions similar to "Nice voice — but what line are you writing for?" Unwilling to try to fit her writing into some of the rules that governed contemporary romances, Abé chose to concentrate on historical romances. For her first attempt at a historical romance, the newlywed Abé chose to tell the story of her own romance with her husband, set in medieval times. The manuscript was purchased by Bantam Books and published as A Rose in Winter.

Many of Abé's subsequent novels have also been set in the medieval time period. Abé chose the time period because of its "great sense of dichotomy....It inspires thoughts of grandeur, of courtly grace and chivalrous knights — but at the same time there's a gritty, raw aspect to the period that just cannot be denied."

Abé has received the Romantic Times Career Achievement Award, and has been nominated six times for Romantic Times Reviewers' Choice Awards, winning twice.

== Bibliography ==
=== Standalone novels ===
- A Rose in Winter (1998)
- The Promise of Rain (1998)
- The Truelove Bride (1999)
- Intimate Enemies (2000)
- A Kiss at Midnight (2000)
- The Secret Swan (2001)
- The Last Mermaid (2004)
- The Second Mrs. Astor (2021)
- An American Beauty(2023)

=== Drákon series ===
- The Smoke Thief (2005)
- The Dream Thief (2006)
- Queen of Dragons (2007)
- The Treasure Keeper (2009)
- The Time Weaver (2010)

=== The Sweetest Dark series ===
- The Sweetest Dark (April 2013)
- The Deepest Night (August 2013)
- The Fiercest Joy (February 2017)
