= Lass Small =

American novelist

- Born: September 15, 1923; San Antonio, Texas
- Died: January 26, 2011 (aged 87); Fort Wayne, Indiana
- Occupation: Novelist
- Spouse: William H. Small (d. January 2010)
- Children: Carolyn Small Grant, Elizabeth Purcell, Virginia Miner Stephens, and Kelly Small
- Writing career
- Pen name: Cally Hughes; Callie Hugher; Lass Small
- Period: 1983–2000
- Genre: Romantic novels

Lass Small (September 15, 1923 – January 26, 2011) was an American writer of over 60 romance novels from 1983 to 2000. She also signed her novelas as Cally Hughes and Callie Hugher.

She lived in Indianapolis, Indiana.

== Bibliography ==
=== As Cally Hughes ===
==== Single novels ====
- Innocent Seduction (1983)
- A Lasting Treasure (1983)
- Whatever It Takes (1984)
- Treasure to Share (1984)
- Never Too Late (1984)
- Cupid's Revenge (1984)

=== As Lass Small ===
==== Single novels ====
- The Dedicated Man (1983)
- Collaboration (1985)
- Tangled Webb (1985)
- Heaven to Kiss (1986)
- An Irritating Man (1986)
- Intrusive Man (1987)
- Possibles (1987)
- Snow Bird (1987)
- Stolen Day (1987)
- To Meet Again (1987)
- To Love Again (1987)
- Marry Me Not (1988)
- Contact (1990)
- The Loner (1990)
- Not Easy (1990)
- Wrong Address Right Place (1990)
- A Nothing Town in Texas (1991)
- Four Dollars and Fifty-one Cents (1991)
- A Nuisance (1995)
- Impulse (1995)
- Not Looking for a Texas Man (1995)
- My House or Yours? (1996)
- Whatever Comes (1996)
- The Case of the Lady in Apartment 308 (1996)
- A Stranger in Texas (1996)
- The Coffeepot Inn (1997)
- The Texas Blue Norther (1997)
- Chancy's Cowboy (1997)
- How to Win Back a Wife (1998)
- The Best Husband in Texas (1999)
- The Catch of Texas (2000)

==== Lambert Sisters series ====
1. Blindman's Bluff (1988)
2. Goldilocks and the Bear (1988)
3. Hide and Seek (1988)
4. Red Rover (1989)
5. Odd Man Out (1989)
6. Tagged (1989)
7. No Trespassing Allowed (1991)
8. Dominic (1992)

==== The Fabulous Brown Family series ====
1. The Molly Q (1991)
2. ´Twas the Night (1991)
3. A Restless Man (1992)
4. Two Halves (1992)
5. Beware of Widows (1992)
6. A Disruptive Influence (1993)
7. Balanced (1993)
8. Tweed (1993)
9. A New Year (1994)
10. I'm Gonna Get You (1994)
11. Salty and Felicia (1994)
12. Lemon (1994)
13. An Obsolete Man (1995)

==== Keepers of Texas series ====
1. Taken by a Texan (1998)
2. The Hard to Tame Texan (1999)
3. The Lone Texan (1999)
4. A Texan Comes Courting (1999)

==== Collections ====
- Small Treasures: Three Complete Novels; A Lasting Treasure / Treasure to Share / Whatever It Takes (1993)

==== Omnibus in collaboration ====
- Love and Laughter (1998) (with Barbara Bretton and Elise Title)
