= Lacey Dancer =

American novelist (born 1948)

Sydney Ann Cook
- Born: February 1948 (age 78)
- Died: Live Oak, Florida
- Resting place: Jacksonville National Cemetery, Jacksonville, Florida
- Occupation: Novelist
- Spouse: Bishop David Clary (1944-2012)
- Writing career
- Pen name: Sara Chance, Sherry Carr, Sydney Ann Clary, Lacey Dancer
- Language: English
- Period: 1983–2023
- Genre: Romance

Sydney Ann Cook (born 1948) is an American author of contemporary and historical romance novels, who wrote under the pen names Sara Chance, Sherry Carr, Sydney Ann Clary and Lacey Dancer.

She won the Romantic Times Career Achievement Award in 1991–1992 for Series Romance Love and Laughter. Romantic Times awarded her a second Career Achievement Award in 1996 for Series Romantic Adventure. Romantic Times described Dancer's novel Silke as "a dazzling, richly intense love story brimming with fascinating characters, sharply imaginative plotting and irresistible romantic suspense".

Many of her early books were published by Meteor in their Kismet line of category romances. The final title in her Pippa series was ready to be shipped to bookstores when Meteor suddenly folded. The orphaned novel, Many Faces of Love, had difficulty finding a new home, partly because the heroine was over 40, which was rare in the romance novel genre. Dancer finally created her own publishing company, Clear Ice Publishing, to release the novel in mass market paperback form.

== Bibliography ==
=== As Sara Chance ===
==== Single novels ====
- Her Golden Eyes (1983)
- Home at Last (1983)
- This Wildfire Magic (1983)
- A Touch of Passion (1985)
- Look Beyond Tomorrow (1986)
- Where the Wandering Ends (1987)
- Double Solitaire (1987)
- Shadow Watch (1988)
- To Tame the Wind (1988)
- With a Little Spice (1989)
- Fire in the Night (1989)

==== Southern ComfortSeries ====
1. Southern Comfort (1988)
2. Woman in the Shadows (1989)
3. Eye of the Storm (1989)

=== As Sherry Carr ===
==== Single novel ====
- Let Passion Soar (1983)

=== Non-Fiction ===
- Care Giving: Real Life Answers (2014)

==== Single novels ====
- Undercover Affair (1986)
- The Duchess and the Devil (1988)
- Misfit Match (1989)

=== As Lacey Dancer ===
==== Single novel ====
- Sunlight on Shadows (1991)

==== Starke-McGuire ====
1. Silent Enchantment (1990)
2. Diamond On Ice (1991)
3. 13 Days of Luck (1991)
4. Flight of the Swan (1992)
5. Baby Makes Five (1992)
6. Forever Joy (1993)
7. Lightning Strikes Twice (1993)
8. His Woman's Gift (1993)
9. Many Faces of Love (2003)

==== St. James Saga ====
1. Silke (1996)
2. Caprice (1996)
3. Leora (1996)
4. Noelle (1996)

=== Pippa Series ===
1. Choices (2013)
2. Diamond and Ice (2016)
3. Thirteen Nights of Luck (2022)

=== Live Oak Series ===
1. Chase the Fire (2015)
2. Playing with Fire (2017)
3. Strike the Fire (2018)
4. Catch the Fire (2020)
5. Light the Fire (2021)

=== Truth Series ===
1. Truth Kills (2019)
2. Truth Tells (August 2020)
3. Truth Wins (July 2022)
