= Jo Ann Algermissen =

American novelist (1942–2009)

- Born: Jo Ann Hudson; August 27, 1942
- Died: November 20, 2009 (aged 67); Texas, U.S.
- Spouse: Henry C. Algermissen
- Children: 2
- Writing career
- Pen name: Anna Hudson
- Language: English
- Period: 1983–1998
- Genre: Romance novels

Jo Ann Algermissen (née Hudson; 27 August 1942 – 20 November 2009, in Texas) was a United States writer of contemporary romance novels, who also wrote under her maiden name, Anna Hudson from 1983 to 1998. Algermissen won three Romantic Times Reviewer's Choice Awards, for her novels I Do?, Marry-Me Christmas, and A Husband for Christmas, and was nominated for a Romantic Times Career Achievement Award.

== Biography ==
Jo Ann Hudson was born on 27 August 1942. She was an educator during lifetime. She married Henry C. Algermissen and they had two children, Henry "Hank" Algermissen and Jayne Algermissen. She died on 20 November 2009 in Texas.

== Bibliography ==
=== As Anna Hudson ===
- Kiss the Tears Away (1983)
- Design for Desire (1983)
- Body and Soul (1984)
- Take My Hand (1984)
- A Prize Catch (1984)
- Honeymoon (1985)
- Fire and Ice (1985)
- Glittering Promises (1985)
- A Whole Lot of Woman (1985)
- Jeweled Skies Shimmering Sands (1986)
- The Perfect Match (1986)
- Rebel Love (1986)
- Tears of Love (1986)
- Fun and Games (1987)
- Denim and Silk (1987)
- Sweet Talkin' Lover (1987)
- Glory (1994)
- Someday (1995)
- Meant to Be (1996)

=== As Jo Ann Algermissen ===
- Capture the Sun (1984)
- Challenge the Fates (1986)
- Naughty But Nice (1986)
- Serendipity Samantha (1986)
- Hank's Woman (1986)
- Purple Diamonds (1987)
- Couple Diamonds (1987)
- Made in America (1987)
- Lucky Lady (1988)
- Blue Emeralds (1988)
- Butterfly (1989)
- Bedside Manner (1989)
- Paper Stars (1989)
- Sunshine (1990)
- Best Man (1990)
- Golden Bird (1990)
- Would You Marry Me Anyway? (1991)
- Family Friendly (1991)
- Hometown Man (1992)
- I Do? (1996)
- A Marry-Me Christmas (1996)
- Mr. Fix-it (1997)
- A Husband for Christmas (1998)
