= Catherine Archer =

American novelist

Catherine J. Archibald
- Born: August 17, 19??
- Occupation: Novelist
- Spouse: Steve
- Children: 3
- Writing career
- Pen name: Catherine Archer, Catherine Archibald
- Period: 1992–2003
- Genre: romance

Catherine J. Archibald (b. 17 August) is an American writer of 13 historical romance novels as Catherine Archer and Catherine Archibald since 1992 to 2003, mainly located in the medieval age.

== Biography ==
Catherine J. Archibald was born on 17 August, and grew up in Oregon, United States, where now lives again. She married a Canadian, Steve, and had three children, they lived in Alberta during 15 years. She enrolling in nursing school twice, and sold her first novel to Harlequin Inc. in 1992.

== Bibliography ==
=== As Catherine Archer ===
==== Single novels ====
- Rose Among Thorns, 1992/07
- Fire Song, 1998/08

==== Velvet Clayburn series ====
1. Velvet Bond, 1995/07
2. Velvet Touch, 1996/06

==== Noble series ====
1. Lady Thorn, 1997/01
2. Lord Sin, 1997/08

==== Ainsworth's Bride series ====
1. Winter's Bride, 1999/09
2. The Bride of Spring, 2000/06
3. Summer's Bride, 2001/01
4. Autumn's Bride, 2001/10

==== Dragon's Brotherhood ====
1. Dragon's Dower, 2002/02
2. Dragon's Knight, 2002/04
3. Dragon's Daughter, 2003/01

=== As Catherine Archibald ===
==== Single novels ====
- Hawk's Lady, 1997/11
- Loving Charity, 2000/04

== References and sources ==
- All About Romance - Connecting with Catherine Archer
- Fantastic Fiction (List of book edition)
