= Sue-Ellen Welfonder =

American writer of romance novels

Sue-Ellen Welfonder is an American writer of romance novels. She is a USA Today bestselling author and the winner of a 2001 award from Romantic Times. Under her married name she writes historical romances set in medieval Scotland, and as Allie Mackay she writes Scottish-set paranormal romances.

== Biography ==
Welfonder is of Scottish ancestry and was born and raised in Florida, United States. She worked as a flight attendant for twenty years, flying primarily international routes because she is fluent in German. After spending several years living in Dallas, Texas, she met her husband in Munich, Germany, where they lived for fifteen years. They have since returned to Florida.

Welfonder learned to read before she entered school and has long been an avid reader. She began corresponding with her favorite romance author Becky Lee Weyrich, describing her travels. Weyrich encouraged her to try writing romances. For the next five years, Welfonder struggled to become a published author. While working on her novel, she also published several travel articles, a short story in the anthology Chocolate for a Lover's Heart, and various articles in her clan's newsletter. She completed four manuscripts in that time. She submitted only two of these for publication. The first, a paranormal romance with a ghost hero, was rejected by multiple publication houses. Discouraged by these rejections, she would often stop writing for weeks or months. She submitted a second of her manuscripts, Devil in a Kilt, to Warner Books, and it was purchased within two weeks. That novel and those that have followed are historical romances, set in Scotland in the medieval time period. Many of her novels also contain elements of the paranormal. Welfonder sets her novels in Scotland as a tribute to her own Scottish heritage, and she has extensively studied Scottish history and culture since childhood. She is an active member of the Macfie Clan Society of North America.

Her ideas generally appear to her when she is visiting the places that will become a book's settings. Once she has identified the right atmosphere, she first envisions the book's eventual hero, who is usually an "Alpha male: super-sexy, dark, and dashingly handsome." Once the hero's backstory has been fleshed out, Welfonder plans an appropriate heroine. Each story is fully planned well before Welfonder begins writing, although occasionally she detours from her plan. She does her own research and often reads reference books about Scotland or the medieval period for fun. Each book takes her approximately six to eight months to write. When she is finished, Welfonder does not read any reviews of the book if at all possible. Negative reviews distract her, and often leave her unable to write for days at a time.

In 2006 Welfonder released Highlander in My Bed, a Scottish-set paranormal romance, under the pseudonym Allie Mackay. For her pen name she chose Scottish names which were also family names, and made sure the new name was shorter than her existing name.

== Bibliography ==
=== As Sue-Ellen Welfonder ===
==== Highland warriors series ====
1. Sins of a highland devil (2011/Jan)
2. Temptation of a highland scoundrel (2011/Aug)
3. Seduction of a highland warrior

==== McKenzie Series ====
1. Devil In A Kilt (2001/Aug)
2. Bride Of The Beast (2003/Jan)
3. Only For A Knight (2005/Jul)
4. Until The Knight Comes (2006/Jul)
5. Bride for a Knight (2007/Sep)
6. Seducing a Scottish Bride (2009/Mar)
7. A Highlander's Temptation (2009/Oct)

==== MacLean Series ====
1. Knight In My Bed (2002/Apr)
2. Master Of The Highlands (2003/Aug)
3. Wedding For A Knight (2004/Sep)

==== Anthologies in collaboration ====
- Tails of Love (2009/Jun) (with Lori Foster, Stella Cameron, Kate Angell, Dianne Castell, Ann Christopher, Marcia James, Donna MacMeans, Sarah McCarty, Patricia Sargeant)
- Time travel romance
- Irish romance

=== As Allie Mackay ===
==== Her Highlander Series ====
1. Highlander In Her Bed (2006/Nov)
2. Highlander in Her Dreams (2007/Nov)
3. Tall, Dark and Kilted (2008/Nov)
4. Some Like It Kilted (2010/Feb)
