= Joanna Mansell =

Writer of romance novels

- Born: Essex, London
- Occupation: Novelist
- Writing career
- Pen name: Joanna Mansell
- Period: 1986–1995
- Genre: Romantic novel

Joanna Mansell was a popular writer of 23 romance novels from 1986 to 1995, who loved gardening and past times spent daydreaming

== Bibliography ==
=== Single novels ===
- The Night Is Dark (1986)
- Sleeping Tiger (1986)
- Black Diamond (1987)
- Miracle Man (1987)
- Illusion of Paradise (1988)
- Lord and Master (1988)
- The Third Kiss (1988)
- Wild Justice (1988)
- Night with a Stranger (1989)
- The Seduction of Sara (1989)
- Devil in Paradise (1990)
- A Kiss By Candlelight (1990)
- Egyptian Nights (1990)
- Haunted Summer (1990)
- Past Secrets (1990)
- Land of Dragons (1991)
- Istanbul Affair (1991)
- Forgotten Fire (1992)
- Secrets of the Night (1992)
- The Touch of Aphrodite (1993)
- Portrait of Cleo (1993)
- A Perfect Seduction (1994)
- Dark Temptation (1995)
