= Jane LeCompte =

American writer of romance novels (born 1948)

(Nancy) Jane LeCompte
- Born: August 20, 1948 (age 78); Eaton, Ohio, U.S.
- Occupation: Novelist
- Writing career
- Pen name: Jane Ashford, Jane LeCompte
- Period: 1980–present
- Genre: Romance
- Website: www.janeashford.com

(Nancy) Jane LeCompte (born August 20, 1948 Eaton, Ohio) is an American writer of romance novels as Jane Ashford and Jane LeCompte. She lives in Cambridge, Massachusetts. She is a two-time nominee for a Career Achievement Award by Romantic Times BOOKreviews Magazine.

== Bibliography ==
=== As Jane Ashford ===
==== Single novels ====
- Gwendeline 1980/01
- Bluestocking 1980/09
- Man of Honour 1981/03
- Rivals of Fortune 1981/10
- The Three Graces 1982/03
- The Marchington Scandal 1982/07
- The Headstrong Ward 1983/05
- A Radical Arrangement 1983/1
- First Season 1984/01
- Cachet 1984/06 reprint as First Impressions 1985/05
- The Impetuous Heiress 1984/06
- The Repentant Rebel 1984/10
- The Irresolute Rivals 1985/02
- Mirage 1986/10
- The Reluctant Rake 1987/05
- Meddlesome Miranda 1988/12
- The Marriage Wager 1996/10
- The Bargain 1997/09
- Charmed and Dangerous 1998/09
- Bride to Be 1999/08
- Once Again a Bride 2013/04

==== Omnibus In Collaboration ====
- Come November / Bluestocking / Hidden Spring (1980) (with Virginia Myers and Rose Swan)

=== As Jane LeCompte ===
==== Single novels ====
- Moon Passage 1989/01
- Sistren 2006/03
