= Jan Coffey =

American novelist

James A. McGoldrick & Nikoo K. Coffey McGoldrick
- Occupation: Novelist
- Writing career
- Pen name: May McGoldrick; Nikoo McGoldrick & James A. McGoldrick; Jan Coffey; Nicole Cody
- Period: 1995–present
- Genres: Romance, Young adults, Suspense
- Website: www.maymcgoldrick.com

Jan Coffey is a joint pen name for the American writers James A. McGoldrick and Nikoo Kafi McGoldrick, a married couple. They also write historical-romance novels as May McGoldrick and other suspense-romance novels as Nicole Cody. As Nikoo McGoldrick & James A. McGoldrick, they also wrote the book Marriage of Minds.

== Biography ==
James A. McGoldrick and Nikoo Kafi met in 1979 in Stonington, Connecticut, and married the following year. He has a PhD in sixteenth-century British literature and she was a manufacturing engineer. They have two children and reside in California.

== Bibliography ==
=== As May McGoldrick ===
==== MacPherson Family Saga Series ====
1. Angel of the Skye (1996/05)
2. Heart of the Gold (1996/11)
3. The Beauty of the Mist (1997/04)
4. The Intended (1998/03)
5. Flame (1998/09)
6. Tess and the Highlander (2002/10)
- The Thistle and the Rose (1995/09, prequel)

==== Highland Treasury Series ====
1. The Dreamer (2000/05)
2. The Enchantress (2000/08)
3. The Firebrand (2000/11)

==== Rebel promise Series ====
1. The Promise (2001/09)
2. The Rebel (2002/07)

==== Scottish dreams Series ====
1. Borrowed Dreams (2003/06)
2. Captured Dreams (2003/12)
3. Dreams of Destiny (2004/05)

==== Nineteenth-century British romance ====
- Ghost of the Thames (2011)

==== The Scottish Relic trilogy ====
1. Much Ado About Highlanders (2017)
2. Taming the Highlander (2017)
3. Tempest in the Highlands (2017)
- A Midsummer Wedding (2018, novella)

==== The Pennington Family ====
1. Romancing the Scot (2017)
2. It Happened in the Highlands (2018)
3. Sleepless in Scotland (2018)
- Sweet Home Highland Christmas (2018, novella)

==== Royal Highlander ====
1. Highland Crown (2019)
2. Highland Jewel (2019)
3. Highland Sword (2020)

==== Standalone Novellas ====
- Mercy
- Thanksgiving in Connecticut (2012)

==== Contemporary Romance ====
- Made in Heaven (2011)

=== As Nikoo McGoldrick & James A. McGoldrick ===
==== Non-fiction ====
- Marriage of Minds (2000/06)
- Step Write Up (2009/11)

=== As Jan Coffey ===
==== Single novels ====
- Trust Me Once (2001/07)
- Twice Burned (2002/07)
- Triple Threat (2003/07)
- Fourth Victim (2004/07)
- Tropical Kiss (2005/05)
- Five in a Row (2005/07)
- Silent Waters (2006/04)
- The Project (2007/01, reissued as Cross Wired)
- The Deadliest Strain (2008/01)
- The Puppet Master (2009/01)
- Blind Eye (2009/09)
- Aquarian (2012)

=== As Nicole Cody ===
==== Single novels ====
- Love and Mayhem (2006/04, reissued as Arsenic and Old Armor)
