= Elizabeth Lambert =

American novelist

Penelope Williamson
- Born: Fairbanks, Alaska, U.S.
- Occupation: Novelist
- Writing career
- Pen name: Penelope Williamson; Elizabeth Lambert; Penn Williamson
- Period: 1988–present
- Genre: Romance
- Notable works: A Wild Yearning, Keeper of the Dream
- Notable awards: RITA award – Series Historical Romance; 1991 A Wild Yearning; RITA award – Single Title Historical Romance; 1993 Keeper of the Dream

Penelope Williamson (born Fairbanks, Alaska, United States) is an American writer of romance novels under her real name and under the pen names Elizabeth Lambert and Penn Williamson. She is a two time winner of the Romance Writers of America RITA Award.

Penelope Williamson lives with her husband in Idaho. According to WorldCat, her most widely held book, The Outsider, is in 1,868 libraries; Heart of the West is in 1,827. Her books have been translated into French, German, Dutch, Spanish, Polish, Chinese, Hungarian, Japanese, Swedish, and Russian.

== Bibliography ==
=== As Penelope Williamson ===
- Beloved Rogue (May 1988)
- Hearts Beguiled (June 1989)
- A Wild Yearning (1991) - Winner of RITA Award
- Keeper of the Dream (April 1992) - Winner of RITA Award
- Once in a Blue Moon (May 1993)
- Heart of the West (April 1995)
- The Outsider (July 1996)
- The Passions of Emma (September 1997) - Nominated for RITA Award
- Wages of Sin (March 2003)
- The Accident (August 2005)

==== Non-fiction ====
- "By Honor Bound: The Heroine as Hero" essay in Dangerous Men and Adventurous Women: Romance Writers on the Appeal of the Romance (1992, ISBN 0-8122-3192-9, 0-8122-1411-0)

=== As Elizabeth Lambert ===
- Wings of Desire (August 1989)

=== As Penn Williamson ===
- Mortal Sins (June 2000)

== Awards and reception ==
- 1991 - Romance Writers of America RITA Award, Series Historical Romance – A Wild Yearning
- 1993 - Romance Writers of America RITA Award, Single Title Historical Romance – Keeper of the Dream
- 1996 - Romantic Times Reviewers' Choice Award, Best All-Around Historical Romance of the Year – The Outsider
