= Anne Holmberg =

American writer

- Born: 1938 (age 87–88); Colorado, United States
- Education: University of Colorado
- Occupation: Novelist
- Writing career
- Pen name: Anne Avery, Kate Holmes, Anne Woodard
- Period: 1991–present
- Genres: Romance, Fantasy, historical romance, Contemporary
- Website: www.anneavery.com

Anne Holmberg (born 1938 in Colorado, United States), is an American writer of historical romance novels under the pen names of Anne Avery and contemporary romance novels as Kate Holmes. She also signed a novel as Anne Woodard.

== Biography ==
Anne Holmberg was born in 1938 in Colorado (United States), where her family has resided for four generations. She obtained a degree in engineering from the University of Colorado.

She has been a four-time nominee (in 1995, 1996, 1997, and 1999) for a Career Achievement Award from Romantic Times Book reviews.

== Bibliography ==
=== As Anne Avery ===
==== Single novels ====
- A Distant Start September 1993
- All's Fair March 1994
- Far Star March 1995
- Hidden Hearts July 1996
- The Snow Queen December 1996
- Summer Fancy July 1997
- Fortune's Fancy February 1998
- The Highwayman's Daughter May 1998
- Bartered Bride March 1999
- Fire & Ice July 2001
- The Lawman Takes a Wife August 2001
- The Bride's Revenge July 2002

==== Anthologies in collaboration ====
- "Dream Seeker" in Enchanted Crossings October 1994 (with Madeline Baker and Kathleen Morgan)
- "A Dance on the Edge" in Lovescape August 1996 (with Phoebe Conn, Sandra Hill and Dara Joy)

=== As Kate Holmes ===
==== Single novels ====
- Amethyst and Gold July 1999
- Sand Castles January 2000
- The Wild Swans June 2000

==== Anthologies in collaboration ====
- "Marry and Her Gentlemen" in A Christmas Bouquet November 1999 (with Trish Jensen)
- Here Comes Santa Claus October 2001 (with Sandra Hill and Trish Jensen)

=== As Anne Woodard ===
==== Single novels ====
- Dead Aim May 2004
