= Natalie Fox =

Natalie Guilar
- Occupation: Novelist
- Spouse: Ian Guilar
- Writing career
- Pen name: Natalie Fox
- Period: 1991-2002
- Genre: Romantic novel

Natalie Guilar, better known by her pen name Natalie Fox, was a popular writer of 26 romance novels from 1991 to 2002. In 1997 she won the Preston Citizen's book of the year award for Passion With Intent, and since then her books have been translated into many languages.

== Biography ==
=== Single novels ===
- Dreams Are for Living (1991)
- Special Sort of Man (1991)
- Nights of Desire (1991)
- Reluctant Mistress (1991)
- Love in Torment (1992)
- Offer Me a Rainbow (1992)
- Revenge (1992)
- An Imperfect Affair (1992)
- Love on Loan (1993)
- A Love Like That (1993)
- Love or Nothing (1993)
- Possessed by Love (1993)
- One Man, One Love (1994)
- The Fury of Love (1994)
- More Than Lovers (1994)
- Thief of Hearts (1995)
- Promise of Passion (1995)
- Passion with Intent (1996)
- Dangerous Ladies (1996)
- Torn by Desire (1996)
- Man Trouble! (1997)
- A Marriage in the Making (1997)
- The Groom's Daughter (1998)
- Love Is Forever (2001)
- Yesterday's Man (2001)
- Mirror Image (2002)
