= Elizabeth Neff Walker =

American author of romance novels

- Born: United States
- Occupation: Novelist
- Writing career
- Pen name: Elizabeth Neff, Laura Matthews
- Period: 1988–present
- Genre: romance

Elizabeth Rotter is an American author of romance novels. She has been published under the pseudonyms Elizabeth Walker, Elizabeth Neff Walker, and Laura Matthews. As Laura Matthews, she has released more than 30 Regency romance novels. Under her other pseudonyms, she writes mainstream women's fiction or contemporary romances, most of them revolving around people working at a hospital.

== Books ==
=== As Elizabeth Neff Walker ===
- Nomad Harp (1980)
- Curious Courting (1980)
- Lady Next Door (1981)
- In My Lady's Chamber (1981)
- Antique Affair (1984)
- That Other Woman (1984)
- Paternity (1985)
- The Healing Touch (1995)
- Fever Pitch (1995)
- The Best Medicine (1996)
- An Abundant Woman (1998)
- Emotional Ties (1999)
- And One to Grow on (2000)

=== As Elizabeth Walker ===
- Paper Tiger (1983)
- Dark Sunrise (1984)
- Summer Frost (1984)
- Voyage (1987)
- Wild Honey (1987)
- Rowan's Mill (1989)
- The Loving Seasons (1989)
- The Court (1990)
- Conquest (1990)
- Hallmark (1991)
- Day Dreams (1992)
- Call Me Brave (1993)
- Child of Shadows (1994)
- Heart Conditions (1994)
- The Snow Tree (1995)
- Godseed (2004)

=== As Laura Matthews ===
- Lord Greywell's Dilemma (1983)
- Emotional Ties (1984)
- The Proud Viscount (1987)
- A Very Proper Widow (1987)
- Miss Ryder's Memoirs (1988)
- Lord Clayborne's Fancy (1989)
- The Ardent Lady Amelia (1990)
- The Seventh Suitor (1991)
- A Baronet's Wife (1992)
- A Curious Courting (1992)
- Alicia (1992)
- The Village Spinster (1993)
- In My Lady's Chamber (1993)
- The Lady Next Door (1993)
- A Fine Gentleman (1999)
- A Prudent Match (2000)
- A Rival Heir (2002)
- The Nomad Harp (2002)
- Holiday in Bath (2003)
- The Aim of a Lady (2003)

=== Omnibus ===
- A Regency Christmas V (1993) (with Mary Balogh, Jo Beverley, Sandra Heath, Edith Layton)
- A Regency Christmas: Five New Stories (1994) (with Mary Balogh, Jo Beverley, Sandra Heath, Edith Layton)
