= Judith Lennox =

British writer

- Born: Salisbury, Wiltshire, England
- Education: Lancaster University
- Occupation: Novelist
- Writing career
- Period: 1989–present
- Genre: Romantic novel
- Website: www.judithlennox.com

Judith Lennox is an English writer of twenty-three romance novels.

== Biography ==
Lennox was born in Salisbury, Wiltshire and grew up in Hampshire.

Lennox comes from a family of scientists, as her father was a research chemist, her mother was a microbiologist, her elder brother is a mathematician, her younger brother is an electronic engineer, and her sister works in a science department at the University of Cambridge. She married Scottish physicist and they have three sons.

She studied English at Lancaster University and is a romance novelist.

== Select works ==
=== Historic novels ===
- Catching the Tide (2011)
- The Heart of the Night (2009)
- Before the Storm (2008)
- A Step in the Dark (2007)
- All My Sisters (2005)
- Shadow Child (1999)
- Footprints on the Sand (1998)
- The Winter House (1996)
- The Secret Years (1994)
- The Italian Garden (1993)
- Till The Day Goes Down (1992)
- The Glittering Strand (1991)

=== Other novels ===
- One Last Dance (2014)
- The Turning Point (2012)
- Middlemere (2004)
- Written on Glass (2003)
- The Dark-eyed Girls (2001)
- Breaking Out (1998)
- Some Old Lover´s Ghost (1996)
