= Rosanne Kohake =

American novelist

Rosanne Frances Lipps Kohake
- Born: July 20, 1951; Cincinnati, Ohio, United States
- Died: March 7, 2012 (aged 60); Cincinnati, Ohio, United States
- Occupation: Novelist
- Spouse: David F. Kohake
- Children: 3
- Writing career
- Pen name: Rosanne Kohake
- Period: 1984–1985
- Genre: Historical romance
- Notable work: For Honor's Lady

For Honor's Lady, 1984/Jan

Rosanne Kohake, née Lipps (b. 20 July 1951 in Cincinnati, Ohio, United States - d. 7 March 2012 in Cincinnati) was an American writer, who has written three historical romance novels published from 1984 to 1985 by Avon Books. Her novels have been translated into other languages, and her debut novel, For Honor's Lady, has been selected as one of the All-Time Favorites & Classics by the Romantic Times Magazine.

== Biography ==
Rosanne Frances Lipps was born on 20 July 1951 in Cincinnati, Ohio, United States.

She published three historical romances placed in different moments of the United States of America's history, published from 1984 to 1985 by Avon Books. Her first novel, For Honor's Lady, was placed in the American Revolution, her second novel, Chastity Morrow, in the American West, and her last novel, Ambrosia, in the Civil War.

She died of multiple myeloma on 7 March 2012, survived by her husband of nearly 40 years, David F. Kohake, and their 3 children: Beth, David Jr., and Claire.

== Bibliography ==
=== Single novels ===
- For Honor's Lady (1984/Jan)
- Chastity Morrow (1985/Jan)
- Ambrosia (1985/Oct)
