= Susanne McCarthy =

- Born: London, England
- Occupation: Novelist
- Writing career
- Period: 1986-present
- Genre: Romantic novel
- Website: www.susannemccarthy.com

Susanne McCarthy is an author of popular fiction who has written many novels over the past forty years. In the 1980s and 1990s she had twenty-five romances published by Mills and Boon, and subsequently self-published three more which are available on Amazon. In 2024 her most recent book was published by Joffe Books of London in their ChocLit imprint.

Susanne was born in London but has travelled widely and lived in various parts of the UK. She is now retired and lives in Devon with her husband and her dog.

== Bibliography ==
=== Single novels ===
- A Long Way from Heaven (1986)
- Don't Ask for Tomorrow (1987)
- Too Much to Lose (1987)
- Caught in a Dream (1988)
- Love Is for the Lucky (1989)
- Trial by Love (1989)
- Tangled Threads (1990)
- A Casual Affair (1990)
- Dance for a Stranger (1991)
- A Candle for the Devil (1991)
- Second Chance for Love (1992)
- Diamond Heart (1992)
- Satan's Contract (1993)
- Master of Deceit (1993)
- Dangerous Entanglement (1994)
- No Place for Love (1994)
- Practised Deceiver (1995)
- Forsaking All Others (1995)
- Bad Influence (1996)
- Her Personal Bodyguard (1997)
- A Married Woman? (1997)
- His Perfect Wife (1998)
- Bride for Sale (1998)
- The Millionaire's Child (1999)
- Groom By Arrangement (1999)
- Rogan's Game (2014)
- Christmas Secrets (2014)
- Summer Scandal (2015)
- Chasing Stars (2015)
- A Fresh Start at Bramble Cottage (2024)
- Coming Home to Sturcombe Bay (2025)

=== Omnibus In Collaboration ===
- Escape to Caribbean Kisses (2006) (Groom By Arrangement by Susanne McCarthy / The Children's Doctor by Joanna Neil)

== References and sources ==
- Susanne McCarthy's Webpage in Fantastic Fiction's Website
