= Paula Quinn =

American novelist

- Occupations: Writer, novelist
- Writing career
- Pen name: Genevra Thorne
- Genre: Historical romance
- Website: pa0854.wixsite.com/paulaquinn

Paula Quinn is an American novelist best known for writing historical fiction focusing on Scotland. She has written New York Times and USA Today best sellers. Quinn has stated that she chose to write predominantly on Scottish history and Highlanders due to a fascination with the country's culture, history, and beauty.

== Reception ==
Critical reception for Quinn's work has been mostly positive, with RT Book Reviews nominating many of her works for RT Awards and choosing them as "Top Picks" for the website. Publishers Weekly has frequently praised Quinn's work, calling her an "author to watch".

In 2009 Quinn won a regional Romance Writers of America award, the Gayle Wilson Award of Excellence for Historical Romance for her book A Highlander Never Surrenders.

== Bibliography ==
=== Risande Series ===
- Lord of Desire (2005)
- Lord of Temptation (2006)
- Lord of Seduction (2006)

=== MacGregor Series ===
- Laird of the Mist (2007)
- A Highlander Never Surrenders (2008)

=== Children of the Mist Series ===
- Ravished by a Highlander (2011)
- Seduced by a Highlander (2011)
- Tamed by a Highlander (2012)
- Conquered by a Highlander (2012)
- A Highlander for Christmas (2012)

=== Highland Heirs Series ===
- The Seduction of Miss Amelia Bell (March, 2014)
- The Wicked Ways of Alexander Kidd (October, 2014)
- The Sweet Surrender of Janet Buchanan (October, 2014)
- The Scandalous Secret of Abigail MacGregor (2015)
- The Taming of Malcolm Grant (2015)
- A Highlander's Christmas Kiss (2016)
- The Scot's Bride (2017)
- Laird of the Black Isle (2018)
- Highlander Ever After (2018)

=== Rulers of the Sky Series ===
- Scorched (2016)
- Ember (2017)
- White Hot (2017)

=== Hearts of the Highlands Series ===
- Heart of Ashes (2019)
- Heart of Shadows (2019)
- Heart of Stone (2019)

=== Writing as Genevra Thorne ===
- The Enchanted (2016)
- The Beloved (2016)
