= Jeanne Hines =

American novelist

- Born: July 29, 1922; West Virginia, United States
- Died: August 23, 2014 (aged 92)
- Occupation: Novelist
- Writing career
- Pen name: Jeanne Hines, Valerie Sherwood, Rosamond Royal
- Period: 1973–1991
- Genres: Gothic fiction, Romance

Jeanne Hines ( July 29, 1922 in West Virginia - August 23, 2014) was an American writer of gothic novels using her real name and romance novels as Valerie Sherwood and Rosamond Royal.

== Biography ==
Jeanne Hines was born in Moorefield, West Virginia, the daughter of Llewellyn Brown McNeill and Bess Heiskell McNeil. She grew up in a traditional family, but dreamed of doing something more than marrying and becoming a housewife. She married in 1943 Edward Thomas Hines (March 2, 1914 - Dec. 8, 2001) and moved to Charlotte, North Carolina, but she was writing while she traveled with her husband between their five mansions along the East Coast.

She worked as a reporter and fashion magazine illustrator before turning to fiction and becoming a novelist. Published since 1973, she penned gothic novels under her real name and romance novels as Valerie Sherwood and Rosamond Royal until 1991. She won the Romantic Times 1987-1988 Career Achievement Award in the category of "historical adventure".

When author Chris Marie Green (a.k.a. Crystal Green), was 19, she wrote a fan letter to Hines, and the historical author answered the gushing missive and inspired her to write her first romance.

== Bibliography ==
=== As Jeanne Hines ===
==== Single novels ====
- The Slashed Portrait, 1973
- Tidehawks, 1974
- Talons of the Hawk, 1975
- Bride of Terror, 1976
- Scarecrow House, 1976
- The Legend of Witchwynd, 1976
- The Keys to Queenscourt, 1976
- The Third Wife, 1977

=== As Valerie Sherwood ===
==== Single novels ====
- This Loving Torment, August 1977
- These Golden Pleasures, November 1977
- Lovely Lying Lips, December 1983
- Born to Love, June 1984
- To Love a Rogue, October 1987
- Her Crowning Glory, 1988
- Lisbon, September 1989

==== Angel Series ====
1. This Towering Passion, November 1978
2. Her Shining Splendor, July 1980
3. The Mistress, 1991

==== Love Series ====
1. Bold Breathless Love, August 1981
2. Rash Reckless love, June 1982
3. Wild Willful Love, October 1982
4. Rich Radiant Love, June 1983

==== Song Series ====
1. Lovesong, September 1985
2. Windsong, March 1986
3. Nightsong, September 1986

=== As Rosamond Royal ===
- Rapture, 1979
