= Diane Gaston =

American novelist

- Born: 1948 (age 77–78)
- Occupation: Novelist
- Writing career
- Genre: Romance
- Notable work: A Reputable Rake
- Notable awards: RITA award – Regency Romance; 2006 A Reputable Rake
- Website: www.dianegaston.com

Diane Gaston (born 1948) is an American author of Regency romance novels. She has also written under the pen name Diane Perkins. She is a RITA Award winner.

== Bibliography ==
=== As Diane Gaston ===
- The Mysterious Miss M (2004)
- The Wagering Widow (2004)
- A Reputable Rake (2005)
- Innocence and Impropriety (2007)
- The Vanishing Viscountess (2007)
- Scandalizing the Ton (2008)
- The Unlacing of Miss Leigh (Harlequin Undone eShort story) (2009)
- Justine and the Noble Viscount in The Diamonds of Welbourne Manor (2009)
- Gallant Officer, Forbidden Lady (2009)
- Regency High-Society Affairs Vol. 12 (2010)
- Regency High-Society Affairs Vol. 13 (2010)
- Pleasurably Undone! (2010)
- Wicked Regency Nights (2010)
- Chivalrous Captain, Rebel Mistress (2010)
- Valiant Soldier, Beautiful Enemy (2011)
- The Liberation of Miss Finch (Harlequin Undone eShort story (2011)
- A Not So Respectable Gentleman? (2012)
- Born to Scandal (2012)
- A Reputation for Notoriety (2013)
- A Lady of Notoriety (2014)
- Bound by Duty (2015)
- Bound by One Scandalous Night (2016)
- Bound by a Scandalous Secret

=== As Diane Perkins ===
- The Improper Wife (2004)
- The Marriage Bargain (2005)

=== Omnibus ===
- Mistletoe Kisses (2006) (with Deborah Hale and Elizabeth Rolls)
- A Regency Christmas: Soldier's Tale / Winter Night's Tale / Twelfth Night Tale (2007) (with Deborah Hale and Elizabeth Rolls)

== Awards and reception ==
Gaston won the Romance Writers of America RITA Award in 2006 for Best Regency Romance for her novel A Reputable Rake. She has been nominated twice for Romantic Times Reviewers' Choice Awards, once for each of the novels written as Diane Perkins. Gaston won the 2016 Virginia Romance Writers Holt Medallion award for Best Historical and for Best Book by Virginia Author for Bound by Duty.
