= Janet Joyce =

American novelist

Janet Bieber & Joyce Thies
- Born: United States
- Occupation: Novelist
- Writing career
- Pen name: Janet Joyce, Jenna Lee Joyce
- Period: 1982–1986
- Genre: Romance novels

Janet Joyce is a pseudonym used for the partnership of American writers Janet Bieber and Joyce Thies. Together they have written more than 15 romance novels.

== Bibliography ==
=== As Janet Joyce ===
==== Single novels ====
- Conquer memories, 1982/06
- Libertine Lady, 1983/02
- Man of the house, 1983/05
- Man of glory, 1983/10
- Controlling interest, 1984/01
- Fields of promise, 1984/02
- Permanent fixture, 1984/03
- Run to gold, 1984/05
- Rare breed, 1984/10
- Secrets of the heart, 1985/03
- Out of shadows, 1985/03
- Glorious destiny, 1985/08
- Out of this world, 1986/01
- Courting trouble, 1986/10

==== Men Made in America series (multi-author) ====
23. Winter Lady, 1983/02

=== As Jenna Lee Joyce ===
==== Single novels ====
- Wintersfield, 1984/12
- Crossroads, 1985/05
- One on one, 1985/10
- A package deal, 1986/06
- Awake unto me, 1986/12

== Bibliography ==
- Jenna Lee Joyce's Webpage in Fantastic Fiction's Website
