= Karen Van der Zee =

Dutch writer

Wendela Kilmer
- Born: 26 May 1947 (age 79); Netherlands
- Occupation: Novelist
- Writing career
- Pen name: Karen Van der Zee; Mona Van Wieren; Miss Footloose
- Period: 1979-present
- Genre: Romantic novel
- Website: karenvanderzee.com

Wendela Kilmer (born 26 May 1947 in the Netherlands) is a globetrotting writer of romance novels. Since 1979, she published over 33 novels under a pseudonym Karen Van der Zee, and two novels as Mona Van Wieren. She received a RITA for Rhapsody in Bloom.

== Biography ==
Wendela Kilmer was born on 26 May 1947 in the Netherlands. She grew up with her three brothers, while she dreamed about visiting the exotic places that read in their books.

She met a globetrotting American in Amsterdam, who asked her to marry him in Rome, Italy. After giving it some thought Wendela went to Nairobi, and they tied the knot in a ten-minute ceremony in Kenya. After Kenya, they lived in the States for a while, then four years in Ghana, West Africa where not only their first daughter was born but her first Mills & Boon romance as well. Karen's husband's work as a development economist has taken them to several other countries. They lived in Indonesia, in Ramallah, the West Bank, again in Ghana, Armenia, which lies east of Turkey and north of Iran and back to the US.

They now live in France. Furthermore, they have three grown kids, who live in the States.

== Bibliography ==
=== As Karen Van der Zee ===
==== Single novels ====
- Sweet Not Always (1979)
- Love Beyond Reason (1980)
- Secret Sorrow (1981)
- Waiting (1982)
- Going Underground (1982)
- One More Time (1983)
- Soul Ties (1984)
- Pelangi Haven (1985)
- Staying Close (1985)
- Time for Another Dream (1986)
- Fancy Free (1986)
- Shadows on Bali (1988)
- Hot Pursuit (1988)
- Brazilian Fire (1989)
- Java Nights (1990)
- Kept Woman (1991)
- The Imperfect Bride (1991)
- Something in Return (1992)
- Passionate Adventure (1993)
- Making Magic (1993)
- A Love Untamed (1994)
- Captive in Eden (1994)
- Fire and Spice (1995)
- The Other Man (1995)
- An Inconvenient Husband (1996)
- Marriage Shy (1996)
- Hired Wife (1999)
- A Wife to Remember (1999)
- Rand's Redemption (2001)
- Midnight Rhythms (2003)
- The Italian's Seduction (2005)

=== As Mona Van Wieren ===
==== Single novels ====
- Rhapsody in Bloom (1989)
- A Prince Among Men (1992)

== Awards ==
- Rhapsody in Bloom by Mona Van Wieren: 1990 Rita Awards Best Novel winner

== References and resources ==
- Karen Van der Zee's Official Website
- Romance website
