= Shane Bolks =

American author

- Born: December 25, 1972 (age 53); Michigan, U.S.
- Education: University of Texas at Austin (BA); University of Houston (MEd)
- Occupation: Novelist / teacher
- Writing career
- Pen name: Shana Galen
- Period: 2000–present
- Genres: Historical romance, chick lit
- Subjects: Romance, women's lives
- Website: shanagalen.com

Shane Bolks (born December 25, 1972), who writes under the pen name Shana Galen, is an American author of "chick lit" and historical romance novels.

== Biography ==
Bolks was a secondary school teacher for over 11 years in Houston, Texas, before turning to writing full-time. She is a founding member of The Sisterhood of the Jaunty Quills and writes blogs on its website. She is a member of the Romance Writers of America. Her brand is Let the Games Begin.

Bolks has a B.A. in psychology from the University of Texas at Austin and a Master of Education from the University of Houston.

Her book, The Good, The Bad, and the Ugly Men I've Dated was a RITA award finalist for "Best First Book". Her first romance novel, which was eventually titled When Dashing Met Danger, finaled in the Romance Writers of America's 2004 Golden Heart competition. Blackthorne's Bride was a 2008 Rita award finalist for "Best Long Historical".

== Bibliography ==
=== As Shane Bolks ===
She writes under her own name when she writes contemporary fiction.

- The Good, The Bad, and the Ugly Men I've Dated (Avon, April 26, 2005) ISBN 0-06-077310-3
- Reality TV Bites (Avon, June 27, 2006) ISBN 0-06-077311-1

=== As Shana Galen ===
She uses the name Shana Galen for her historical romance books.

- When Dashing Met Danger (Avon, April 26, 2005)- set in 1805 England. ISBN 0-06-077315-4
- Pride and Petticoats (Avon, January 31, 2006) - set in 1813 England. ISBN 0-06-077316-2

==== The Misadventures in Matrimony series ====
1. No Man's Bride (Avon, August 29, 2006) - set in Regency England. ISBN 0-06-112494-X
2. Good Groom Hunting (Avon, January 30, 2007) - set in 19th century England and the high seas. ISBN 0-06-112496-6
3. Blackthorne's Bride (Avon, November 1, 2007) ISBN 0-06-112497-4

==== Sons of the Revolution ====
1. The Making of a Duchess (Sourcebooks Casablanca, June 2010). ISBN 978-1402238659
2. The Making of a Gentleman (Sourcebooks Casablanca, October 2010). ISBN 978-1402238666
3. The Rogue Pirates's Bride (Sourcebooks Casablanca, February 2012). ISBN 978-1402265556

==== Regency Spy series ====
1. Lord and Lady Spy (Sourcebooks Casablanca, September 2011). ISBN 978-1402259074

==== Jewels of the Ton ====
1. When You Give a Duke a Diamond (Sourcebooks Casablanca, September 2012). ISBN 978-1402269738
2. If You Give a Rake a Ruby (Sourcebooks Casablanca, March 2013). ISBN 9781402269769
3. Sapphires Are an Earl's Best Friend (Sourcebooks Casablanca, March 2014). ISBN 9781402269790

==== The Survivors ====
1. Third Son's a Charm, Book 1 (Sourcebooks Casablanca, November 2017). ISBN 9781492657033
2. No Earls Allowed, Book 2 (Sourcebooks Casablanca, March 2018). ISBN 9781492639015
3. An Affair with a Spare, Book 3 (Sourcebooks Casablanca, July 2018). ISBN 9781492638957
4. Unmask Me if You Can, Book 4. (Amazon Digital Services, September 2018). ASIN B07G9VJL3Z
5. The Claiming of the Shrew, Book 5. (Amazon Digital Services, April 2019). ASIN B07MXMJ7Q8
6. A Duke a Dozen, Book 6. (Amazon Digital Services, September 2019). ASIN B07T9PGGVL
7. How the Lady was Won, Book 7. (Amazon Digital Services, February 2020). ASIN B081QKBHV6
8. Kisses and Scandal, Book 7.5. (Amazon Digital Services, April 2020). ASIN B084NZ959Q
9. The Highlander's Excellent Adventure, Book 8. (Amazon Digital Services, September 2020). ASIN B0871MQXG8
