= Sue Civil-Brown =

American novelist

- Occupation: Novelist
- Writing career
- Pen name: Rachel Lee
- Language: English
- Genre: Romance

Susan Civil-Brown is an American author of romance novels with a humorous twist. She is best known under the pseudonym Rachel Lee. Her books include romances, romantic suspense and a series of espionage thrillers (Wildcard, The Crimson Code, The Jerico Pact).

Civil-Brown's first book was published in 1991. She submitted the manuscript, a romantic suspense novel, at the urging of her mother and was surprised when it was quickly purchased. Over the next five years she wrote 15 more books.

== Bibliography ==
=== Non-fiction ===
- "The Defense Rests" essay in North American Romance Writers (1999, ISBN 0810836041)
