= Patricia Grasso =

American writer of romance novels (born 1950)

Patricia H. Grasso
- Born: 1950/1951; Massachusetts, United States
- Occupations: Teacher, novelist
- Writing career
- Pen name: Patricia Grasso
- Period: 1991–present
- Genre: Romance
- Website: www.patriciagrasso.com

Patricia Helen Grasso (born in Massachusetts, United States) is an American writer of romance novels.

She has won a Romantic Times Reviewers’ Choice Award, a Romantic Times KISS Award, and a National Readers’ Choice Award.

== Biography ==
Patricia H. Grasso was born in Massachusetts as the daughter of Constantino and Helen Grasso. She earned bachelor's and master's degrees in English and, for thirty years, used her "leisure" time to teach in a public high school.

Grasso lives in Winchester, north of Boston, Massachusetts.

== Bibliography ==
=== Deveraux-MacArthur Family Series ===
1. Emerald Enchantment (1992/Feb)
2. Highland Belle (1991/Feb)
3. Desert Eden (1993/Mar)
4. Loving in a Mist (1994/Nov)
5. Courting an Angel (1995/Nov)
6. My Heart's Desire (1997/Jan)

=== Dukes Series ===
1. Violets in the Snow (1998/Jan)
2. No Decent Gentleman (1999/Feb)
3. To Tame a Duke (2001/Jul)

=== Douglas Family Saga Series ===
1. To Tempt an Angel (2002/Jun)
2. To Charm a Prince (2003/Jun)
3. To Catch a Countess (2004/May)

=== Kazanov Royalty Series ===
1. To Charm a Prince (2003/Jun)
2. To Love a Princess (2004/Nov)
3. Seducing the Prince (2005/Apr)
4. Pleasuring the Prince (2006/Apr)
5. Tempting the Prince (2007/May)
6. Enticing The Prince (2008/Nov)
7. Marrying the Marquis (2009/Dec)
