= Pat Warren =

American novelist

Pat Warren (born 1936) is an American author of contemporary romance novels under her own name and the pseudonym Patricia Cox.

At age 16, Warren began writing a column for the Akron Beacon Journal. As an adult, she wrote articles about marriage and motherhood for the Detroit News. In 1986, she sold a novel to Silhouette Books. Two years later, in 1988, she won the inaugural Desert Rose Award, given by the Phoenix Desert Rose chapter of the Romance Writers of America.

Warren has published novels in various genres, including contemporary romance, romantic suspense, mystery, and mainstream. Several reached the Waldenbooks and B. Dalton bestseller lists. As of 2007, more than 3.5 million copies of her novels were in print worldwide.

== Bibliography ==
- Final Verdict (1987)
- With This Ring (1987)
- Seasons of the Heart (1987)
- Look Homeward Love (1988)
- Summer Shadows (1988)
- The Evolution of Adam (1988)
- Perfect Strangers (1989)
- Build Me a Dream (1989)
- Surgeon's Secret (1989)
- Long Road Home (1989)
- The Lyon and the Lamb (1990)
- My First Love, My Last (1990)
- Winter Wishes (1990)
- Till I Loved You (1991)
- An Uncommon Love (1991)
- Bright Hopes (1992)
- Sunshine (1992)
- Til Death Do Us Part (1992)
- Under Sunny Skies (1992)
- That Hathaway Woman (1992)
- Simply Unforgettable (1993)
- Nowhere to Run (1993)
- This I Ask of You (1993)
- On Her Own (1993)
- Outlaw Lovers (1994)
- A Bride for Hunter (1994)
- Only the Lonely (1994)
- Forbidden (1995)
- Nobody's Child (1995)
- Shattered Vows (1995)
- Keeping Kate (1996)
- A Home for Hannah (1996)
- Michael's House (1996)
- Beholden (1996)
- No Regrets (1997)
- Daddy's Home (1998)
- Stand-In Father (1998)
- Come Morning (1998)
- Stranded on the Ranch (1998)
- The Baby Quest (2000)
- Doctor and the Debutante (2000)
- The Lawman and the Lady (2000)
- Daddy by Surprise (2000)
- The Way We Wed (2001)
- My Very Own Millionaire (2002)
- A Mother's Secret (2003)
- Her Kind of Cowboy (2004)

=== Omnibus ===
- Her Kind of Cowboy / Baby They Both Loved (2004) (with Nikki Benjamin)
