= Kate Bridges =

Canadian writer

- Born: Ontario, Canada
- Occupations: Nurse, novelist
- Writing career
- Pen name: Kate Bridges
- Language: English
- Period: 2002–Present
- Genre: Romance
- Website: www.katebridges.com

Kate Bridges is a Canadian writer of romance novels since 2002.

== Biography ==
=== Personal life ===
Kate Bridges grew up in Ontario, Canada and later in the Alberta prairies. During early years she worked as a pediatric intensive-care nurse. She also studied architecture and design. Married, she lives in Toronto, Ontario.

=== Writing career ===
Kate Bridges is a USA Today bestselling author. Her books have won several publishing awards, including Best Western of the Year by Romantic Times magazine for The Surgeon (2003) and Best Hero of the Year for The Engagement (2004). Five of her books received RT magazine's Best Hero of the Month honor.

== Bibliography ==
=== Single novels ===
- The Doctor's Homecoming (2002)
- Luke's Runaway Bride (2002)
- The Midwife's Secret (2003)

=== Canadian Mounties ===
1. The Surgeon (2003)
2. The Engagement (2004)

=== Reid Brothers' Trilogy ===
1. The Proposition (2004)
2. The Bachelor (2005)
3. The Commander (2006)

=== Klondike Gold Rush ===
1. Klondike Doctor (2007)
2. Klondike Wedding (2007)
3. Klondike Fever (2008)

=== Alaskan ===
1. Wanted in Alaska (2009)
2. Alaskan Renegade (2009)
3. Alaska Bride on the Run (2010)

=== Omnibus ===
- Engagement / Proposition / Bachelor (2005)

=== Anthologies in collaboration ===
- Frontier Christmas (2003) (with Carolyn Davidson and Ana Leigh)
- A Season of the Heart (2005) (with Mary Burton and Jillian Hart)
- Western Weddings (2008) (with Jillian Hart and Charlene Sands)
- Mail-Order Marriages (2010) (with Carolyn Davidson and Jillian Hart)
