= Winifred Langford Mantle =

English writer

- Born: 15 February 1911
- Died: 13 November 1983 (aged 72)
- Writing career
- Pen name: Jan Blaine; Anne Fellowes; Frances Lang; Jane Langford
- Genres: romantic novels; young adult fiction

Winifred Langford Mantle (1911–1983) was an English writer of romantic novels and young adult fiction. She wrote under several pseudonyms, including Jan Blaine, Anne Fellowes, Frances Lang and Jane Langford.

== Life ==
Winifred Langford Mantle was born on 15 February 1911 in Staffordshire, England. She was the daughter of Joseph Longford Mantle and Florence Fellows. She studied at Lady Margaret Hall, Oxford, gaining a BA in 1932.

Mantle died on 13 November 1983, in Wolverhampton, Staffordshire.

== Works ==
- Happy is the House: a novel, 1951.
- (as Jane Langford) Haste to the Wedding. Mills & Boon, 1955. A shorter version was published serially in Woman's Weekly.
- The Secret Fairing, 1956.
- The Keys of Heaven, 1958.
- The Hiding Place, 1962.
- The Leaping Lords, 1963
- Tinker's Castle, 1963.
- Country Cousin: a novel, 1963.
- Sandy Smith, 1963.
- The Château Holiday, 1964.
- The Question of the Painted Cave, 1965
- The Penderel Puzzle, 1966.
- Summer at Temple Quentin, 1967.
- The Admiral's Wood, 1967.
- The Penderel House, 1966.
- Winter at Wycliffe, 1968
- The Tower of Remicourt, 1971
- Jonnesty, 1973.
- The Inconvenient Marriage, 1974.
- Jonnesty in Winter, 1975.
- The Beckoning Maiden, 1976.
- The Vanishing Bridegroom, 1980.
- To Be a Fine Lady, 1985.
