= Joyce Thies =

American writer of romance novels

- Born: United States
- Occupation: Novelist
- Writing career
- Pen name: Joyce Thies, Janet Joyce (with Janet Bieber), Jenna Lee Joyce (with Janet Bieber)
- Period: 1982–1991
- Genre: Romance novels

Joyce Thies is an American writer of romance novels. She began her writing career as a coauthor with Janet Bieber, writing under the names Janet Joyce and Jenna Lee Joyce; together they wrote more than fifteen romances. She later wrote romance novels under her real name.

== Bibliography ==
=== As Joyce Thies ===
==== Single novels ====
- Territorial Rgts 1984/06
- Still Waters, 1987/01
- Spellbound 1987/03
- False pretenses 1987/05
- The primorose path 1987/08
- Moon of the raven 1988/05
- Reach for the moon 1988/07
- Call Down the Moon 1989/04
- Pride and joy 1991/01

==== Hubbard series ====
1. King of the mountain 1990/01
2. The drifter 1991/03

==== Omnibus in collaboration ====
- WESTERN LOVERS: Hitched in Haste / A Marriage of Convenience / Where Angels Fear / Mountain Man / The Hawk and the Honey / Wild Horse Canyon / Someone Waiting 1989/01 (with Doreen Owens; Gray Ginna; Dixie Browning; Elizabeth August; Joan Malek Hohl)
