= Charlotte Vale-Allen =

Canadian writer (1941–2023)

- Vale-Allen in 2002
- Born: January 19, 1941; Toronto, Ontario, Canada
- Died: January 12, 2023 (aged 81); Norwalk, Connecticut, U.S.
- Occupation: Novelist
- Spouse: Walter Bateman Allen Jr. (m. 1970)
- Children: 1
- Writing career
- Pen name: Charlotte Vale-Allen; Katharine Marlowe
- Period: 1971–2023
- Genre: Contemporary Fiction
- Website: www.charlottevaleallen.com

Charlotte Vale-Allen (January 19, 1941 – January 12, 2023) was a Canadian writer of contemporary fiction. She lived in the United Kingdom from 1961 to 1964 working as a singer and actress. She emigrated to the United States in 1966 following a brief return to Canada. After marrying Walter Bateman Allen Jr. in 1970, she moved to Connecticut where she lived until her death in 2023.

== Biography ==
Vale-Allen (who would never reveal either her birthname or her father's name) was born on January 19, 1941, in Toronto, Ontario, Canada and lived in England from 1961 to 1964 where she worked as a television actress and singer. She returned to Toronto briefly, performing as a singer and in cabaret revues until she emigrated to the United States in 1966. She adopted the name "Charlotte Vale" from the Bette Davis character of the film Now, Voyager.

She married Walter Bateman Allen Jr. in 1970, adopting his surname, portmanteau-style. They made their home in Connecticut and she began to write. Her first book, Daddy's Girl, was written in 1971, detailing the sexual abuse she described at the hands of her father. It was initially rejected by editors who considered the topic of incest too contentious. It was eventually published in 1980.

Charlotte Vale-Allen died at age 81 in Norwalk, Connecticut. She was survived by her daughter and extended family.

== Bibliography ==
=== As Charlotte Vale-Allen ===
- Hidden Meanings 1976 Island Nation Press reissue
- Love Life 1976 Island Nation Press reissue
- Sweeter Music 1976 Island Nation Press reissue
- Another Kind of Magic 1977 subsequently combined with HIDDEN MEANINGS
- Gentle Stranger 1977 Island Nation Press reissue
- Mixed Emotions 1977 Island Nation Press reissue
- Running Away 1977 Island Nation Press reissue
- Becoming 1978 Island Nation Press reissue
- Believing in Giants1978 reissued as MEMORIES Island Nation Press reissue
- Gifts of Love 1978 Island Nation Press reissue
- Julia's Sister 1978 Island Nation Press reissue
- Meet Me in Time 1978 Island Nation Press reissue
- Acts of Kindness 1979 Island Nation Press reissue
- Moments of Meaning 1979 Island Nation Press reissue
- Times of Triumph 1979 Island Nation Press reissue
- Daddy's Girl 1980 Island Nation Press reissue
- Promises 1980 Island Nation Press reissue
- Perfect Fools 1981 Island Nation Press reissue
- The Marmalade Man 1981—issued in paperback as DESTINIES Island Nation Press reissue
- Intimate Friends 1983 Island Nation Press reissue
- Pieces of Dreams 1984 Island Nation Press reissue
- Matters of the Heart1985 Island Nation Press reissue
- Time/Steps 1986 Island Nation Press reissue
- Illusions 1987 Island Nation Press reissue
- Dream Train 1988 Island Nation Press reissue
- Night Magic 1989 Island Nation Press reissue
- Painted Lives 1990 Island Nation Press reissue
- Leftover Dreams 1992 Island Nation Press reissue
- Dreaming in Color 1993 Island Nation Press reissue
- Somebody's Baby 1995 Island Nation Press reissue
- Claudia's Shadow 1996 Island Nation Press reissue
- Mood Indigo 1997 Island Nation Press reissue
- Parting Gifts 2001 Island Nation Press reissue
- Grace Notes 2002 Island Nation Press reissue
- The Young Person's Dreambook, An Abuse Workbook, 2002 companion to Daddy's Girl
- Fresh Air 2003 Island Nation Press reissue
- Sudden Moves 2004 Island Nation Press reissue
- Where Is the Baby? 2012/ISBN 978-0727881359 (Severn House)

=== As Katharine Marlowe ===
- Heart's Desires 1991 Island Nation Press reissue
- Secrets 1992 Island Nation Press reissue
- Nightfall 1993 Island Nation Press reissue
