= Joan Bramsch =

American entrepreneur, teacher and romance writer

- Born: February 25, 1936; St. Louis, Missouri
- Died: March 29, 2009 (aged 73); St. Louis
- Education: Washington University in St. Louis
- Occupation(s): Romance writer, teacher
- Organizations: Romance Writers of America
- Spouse: William E. Bramsch (1954)
- Children: 5
- Parent(s): Melvin J. and Margaret (Lameker) Schlanger

Joan Bramsch (February 25, 1936 – March 29, 2009), was an American entrepreneur, teacher, and romance writer. Her published work includes six romance novels and a non-fiction book about homeschooling.

Born in St. Louis in 1936, the daughter of Melvin J. and Margaret Schlanger, she worked as a teletype and radio operator for Delta Air Lines in 1953 and 1954. In 1954, she married William E. Bramsch, an engineer. The couple had five children.

A partner at Gee-Bee Specialties and a free-lance designer from 1970 through 1978, she tutored at private and public schools in St. Louis, Missouri, from 1976 through 1982 and started a business, Liberty Communications House, in 1979. Bramsch attended Washington University in St. Louis, completing an associate of arts degree in 1979, a Bachelor of Science (B.S.) in English in 1982, and a B.S. in communications and journalism in 1984. She contributed to periodicals and was the newsletter editor for Romance Writers of America from 1984 through 1986.

Bramsch died on March 29, 2009, in St. Louis.

== Bibliography ==
=== Nonfiction ===
- Teach Me, I'm Yours (nonfiction) (1979) OCLC 6241088

=== Romance novels ===
- The Sophisticated Mountain Gal (1984) OCLC 11057664
- A Kiss to Make It Better (1984) OCLC 11504567
- The Light Side (1985) OCLC 11811225
- At Nightfall (1985) OCLC 12348889
- The Stallion Man 1985 OCLC 13313930
- With No Reservations (1987) OCLC 16348136
