= Florence Hershman =

American novelist (1928–2008)

- Born: 1928
- Occupation: Novelist
- Writing career
- Pen name: Diana Haviland, Diana Browning, Florence Hershman
- Period: 1971 - 2008
- Genre: Historical romance

Florence Hershman (1928-2008) was an American writer of over a dozen romance novels since 1977, well known as Diana Haviland, she also wrote a novel as Diana Browning. More than five millions of her books are in print around the world.

== Biography ==
Florence Hershman as Diana Haviland published her first novel in 1977, The Passionate Pretenders, that appeared on the New York Times bestseller list, and won an award from the West Coast Review of Books. She wrote a dozen of novels under this pseudonym. In 1987, she also wrote a romance novel as Diana Browning. In 1971, she wrote her first non-fiction book, Witchcraft U.S.A., the research for her book provided her with some of the background material she uses in A Love Beyond Forever. In 2006, she wrote a historical suspense novel, Death on the Ladies Mile.

Hershman and her husband, another writer, lived in New York City. She was a Charter Member of the New York Chapter of Romance Writers of America and of PASIC.

== Bibliography ==
=== As Diana Haviland ===
==== Single novels ====
- The Passionate Pretenders (1977/Apr)
- The Moreland Legacy (1977/Sep)
- Love's Promise Land (1978/Jan)
- Defy the Storm (1981/Apr)
- Fortune's Daughter (1984/Dec)
- Embrace the Flame (1991/May)
- Pirate's Kiss (1992/Jun)
- Stolen Splendor (1994/Apr)
- A Love Beyond Forever (1999/Jan)
- Death on the Ladies Mile (2006/Mar)

==== Rafferty Saga ====
1. Proud Surrender (1983/Jan)
2. My Dearest Love (1996/Sep)

=== As Diana Browning ===
==== Single novels ====
- All the Golden Promises (April 1987)

=== As Florence Hershman ===
==== Non-fiction books ====
- Witchcraft U.S.A. (1971)
