= Nan Ryan =

American novelist

Nancy Henderson Ryan
- Born: 1936; Texas, United States
- Died: March 14, 2017 (aged 80–81)
- Occupation: Novelist
- Writing career
- Pen name: Nancy Henderson Ryan, Nan Ryan
- Period: 1983–2017
- Genre: Romance

Nancy Henderson Ryan (1936 – March 14, 2017) was an American writer of romance novels under her full name and as Nan Ryan.

== Biography ==
Nancy Henderson was born in Texas, the middle daughter of a rancher and postmaster.

In 1981, after reading an article on romance writers, "From bedroom to boardroom", she began to write with her Smith Corona.

Nan married Joe Ryan, a television director. They lived in Washington, California, New Mexico, Colorado, Arizona, Missouri, Alabama, Georgia, Florida, and her native Texas.

Nan Ryan won Historical Storyteller of the year in 1995 from Romantic Times. She was nominated for Best Western Historical romance in 1997. Ryan was named Best historical storyteller of the year in again in 2001.

Ryan was nominated for the Romantic Times Reviewers' Choice Award in 2003 for Best Western Romance for her novel Naughty Marietta.

Nan Ryan died on March 14, 2017, in Bryson, Texas.

== Bibliography ==
=== As Nancy Henderson Ryan ===
==== Single Novel ====
- Kathleen's surrender, 1983/Jan

=== As Nan Ryan ===
==== Single Novels ====
- Lightning strikes twice, 1987/May
- Wayward Lady, 1987/May
- Desert storm, 1987/Jun
- Love in the air, 1987/Sep
- Midnight affair, 1988/Jul
- Stardust, 1988/Oct
- Savage heat, 1989/Jan
- Silken bondage, 1989/Jan
- Outlaw's kiss, 1989/Fev
- Sun god, 1990/Sep
- Cloudcastle, 1990/Oct
- The legend of the love, 1991/Sep
- Written in the starts, 1992
- Love me tonight, 1994
- A life time of heaven, 1994/Fev
- Because you're mine, 1995/Aug
- You belong to my heart, 1996/Fev
- Burning love, 1996/Sep
- The princess goes west, 1998/Jul
- Waning you, 1999/Jul
- The countess misbehaves, 2000/Jun
- The seducction of Ellen, 2001/Apr
- The scandalous Miss Howard, 2002/Apr
- Naughty Marietta, 2003/Apr
- The last dance, 2003/Dec
- Chieftain, 2004/Mar
- Duchess for a day, 2005/Jun
- The sheriff, 2006/Apr
- Dearest enemy, 2006/Nov
- "Kathleen's Surrender" 2012/Oct E book Open Road Media
- "Desert Storm" 2012/Oct E book Open Road Media
- "Savage Heat" 2012/Oct E book open road media
- "Burning Love" 2012/Oct E book Open Road Media
- "Desert Storm" 2012/Oct E book Open Road Media
- "Outlaw's Kiss" 2012/Oct E book Open Road Media
- "Burning Love"2012/Oct E book Open Road Media

== Sources ==
- Nan Ryan at Fantastic Fiction
