= Kathryn Ptacek =

American novelist

Kathryn Anne Ptacek Grant
- Born: Kathryn Anne Ptacek; September 12, 1952 (age 73); Omaha, Nebraska, U.S.
- Education: University of New Mexico (BA)
- Occupations: Writer, editor
- Spouse: Charles L. Grant (1982-2006)
- Writing career
- Pen name: Les Simons, Kathryn Atwood, Anne Mayfield, Kathleen Maxwell, Kathryn Ptacek, Kathryn Grant
- Language: English
- Period: 1981–present
- Genres: science fiction, fantasy, horror, suspense, romance

Kathryn Grant, née Ptacek (born September 12, 1952) is an American writer and editor. Since 1981, she has published science fiction, fantasy, horror, suspense, and romance short stories and novels under her maiden and married names, and under the pseudonyms Les Simons, Kathryn Atwood, Anne Mayfield, and Kathleen Maxwell. She is the editor and publisher of the writers-market magazine The Gila Queen's Guide to Markets.

== Biography ==
Kathryn Anne Ptacek was born on September 12, 1952, in Omaha, Nebraska, United States, but she was raised in Albuquerque, New Mexico. She received her B.A. in Journalism, with a minor in history, with honors from the University of New Mexico in 1974. She was married to Charles L. Grant from February 1982 until his death in 2006.

She has also edited several anthologies of short stories. Her short story "Each Night, Each Year" was nominated for the 1989 Bram Stoker Award for Best Short Fiction.

== Bibliography ==
This is a partial bibliography of her work.

=== As Les Simons ===
==== Single novels ====
- Gila! (1981)

=== As Kathryn Atwood ===
==== Single novels ====
- Satan's Angel (1981)
- Renegade Lady (1982)
- The Lawless Heart (1984)
- My Lady Rogue (1986)
- Aurora (1987)

=== As Anne Mayfield ===
==== Single novels ====
- The Wayward Widow (1982)

=== As Kathleen Maxwell ===
==== Single novels ====
- The Devil's Heart (1983)
- Winter Masquerade (1984)

=== As Kathryn Ptacek ===
==== Single novels ====
- Shadoweyes (1984)
- Blood Autumn (1985)
- Kachina (1986)
- In Silence Sealed (1988)
- Ghost Dance (1990)
- The Hunted (1993)

==== Omnibus collections ====
- Looking Backward in Darkness (2013)

=== As Kathryn Grant ===
==== Land of Ten Thousand Willows ====
1. The Phoenix Bells (1987)
2. The Black Jade Road (1989)
3. The Willow Garden (1989)

=== Anthologies edited ===
- Women of Darkness (1989)
- Women of Darkness II
