= Barbara Andrews (novelist) =

American writer

- Born: Unknown; US
- Occupation: Novelist
- Writing career
- Pen name: Barbara Andrews, Jennifer Drew (with Pam Hanson), Pam Rock (with Pam Hanson)
- Period: 1982–present
- Genre: Romance novels

Barbara Andrews is an American writer of 20 romance novels under her real name; with her daughter, Pam Hanson, she now writes under the pseudonyms Jennifer Drew and Pam Rock.

== Biography ==
Barbara Andrews wanted a career she could combine with motherhood and four children. She made her first sale to Highlights for Children, when her children were in kindergarten. She is the author of 20 romance novels under her own name.

Andrews's daughter, Pam Hanson, majored in journalism in college and later worked as a reporter. Pam married a college professor and started a family. After the birth of her first child, Pam teamed up with her mother to write romance novels. Together they have published novels under the pseudonyms Jennifer Drew and Pam Rock.

For several years, their partnership was long-distance, but nowadays they share a house in West Virginia, along with Pam's husband and their two sons, Erik and Andrew Hanson. In the summer of 2008, she moved to Nebraska with Pam and her family.

== Awards and honors ==
As Jennifer Drew, the mother and daughter were nominated for a Romantic Times Reviewers' Choice Award in 2003, and for Best Harlequin Duets for the novel Desperately Seeking Sully.

== Bibliography ==
=== As Barbara Andrews ===
==== Single novels ====
- Love Trap 1982/10
- Stolen Promises 1983/01
- This Bittersweet Love 1983/02
- Emerald Fire 1983/08
- Passionate Deceiver 1983/09
- Happily Ever After 1984/10
- Midnight Magic 1984/12
- Shady Business 1984/12
- My Kind of Love 1985/01
- A Novel Affair 1985/03
- Loving Lessons 1985/05
- Reach for the Sky 1985/05
- Stand-in Lover 1985/09
- Add a Dash of Love 1985/12
- A Different Kind of Man 1986/04
- Seduced by a Stranger 1986/12
- Trapped by Desire 1986/12
- Escape From the Storm 1987/01
- Summer of Promises 1987/06

=== As Jennifer Drew ===
==== Single novels ====
- Turn Back the Night 1994/10
- Dear Mr. Right 1996/09
- The Prince and the Bogus Bride 1997/12
- The Bad-Girl Bride 1998/10
- Baby Lessons 1999/12
- Stop the Wedding! 2002/03
- Just Desserts 2002/07
- Hitched for the Holidays 2002/12
- You'll Be Mine in 99 2003/05
- Desperately Seeking Sully 2003/08
- All Wrapped Up 2003/12
- The Banker's Convenient Wife 2004/04

==== Grant Sisters series ====
1. Taming Luke 1999/08
2. Mr. Right Under Her Nose 2001/02

==== Bailey Brothers series ====
1. One Bride too Many 2001/09
2. One Groom to Go 2001/09

=== As Pam Rock ===
- Mercy's Mission, 2002/02
- Moon of Desire
- Star Searcher
