= Constance Laux =

American writer

- Born: January 21, 1952; Cleveland, Ohio (U.S.)
- Occupation: Novelist
- Writing career
- Pen name: Constance Laux, Connie Deka, Connie Lane, Connie Laux, Casey Daniels, Kylie Logan, Zoe Daniels, Miranda Bliss, Anastasia Hastings, Lucy Ness, Mimi Granger
- Period: 1992 - present
- Genre: Romance

Constance Laux (born January 21, 1952, in Cleveland, Ohio) is an American writer of romance novels as her real name and of mystery and young adult novels under her many pen names: Connie Deka, Connie Lane, Connie Laux, Casey Daniels, Zoe Daniels, Kylie Logan, Miranda Bliss, Mimi Granger, Lucy Ness, and Anastasia Hastings.

== Biography ==
Constance Laux was born on January 21 in Cleveland, Ohio (U.S.). She studied English Literature at Queen's College in Oxford, England (UK).

She married her childhood sweetheart, and they live in Brecksville, a suburb of Cleveland, with their two children.

Connie began writing during the summer of 1990 with her first book, The Fortune Teller. The book would go on to be nationally recognized.

Connie writes under many pseudonyms to differentiate the types and tones of books that she writes.

== Bibliography ==
=== As Constance Laux ===
- Twilight Secrets 1992/Fev
- Moonlight Whispers 1993/Jan
- Earthly Delights 1995/Mar
- Touched By Magic 1996/Jul
- Devil's Diamond 1998/Apr
- Diamond Rain 1999/Apr

Lords of Desire multi-author series

- Diamonds and Desire 2000/Aug

Anthology contribution

- Angel Love 1996/Aug (with Janice Bennett, Mallory Burgess, Elizabeth Graham, Patricia McAllister, Doreen Owens Malek, Karen Ranney and John Scognamiglio)

=== As Connie Deka ===
- Bright Promise 1993/Jun

=== As Zoe Daniels ===
The Year of the Cat

- The Dream 1995
- The Hunt 1995
- The Amulet 1995

=== As Connie Laux ===
Blood Moon

- The Curse 1995
- The Fortune Teller 1995
- The Reckoning 1996

Ghosts of Fear Street, with R. L. Stine

- Fright Night 1996

=== As Connie Lane ===
- Reinventing Romeo 2000/Nov
- Romancing Riley 2002/Jan
- Guilty Little Secrets 2003/Mar
- The Viscounts Bawdy Bargain 2003/Jun
- Dirty Little Lies 2004/Mar
- The Duke's Scandalous Secret 2004/Aug
- Sarah's Guide To Life, Love & Gardening 2005/Jun
- Knit Two Together 2007/Mar

Burton at Cupid's Hideaway Series

- Stranded at Cupid's Hideaway 2002/Jul
- Christmas at Cupid's Hideaway 2003/Nov

=== As Miranda Bliss ===
A Cooking Class Mystery

- Cooking Up Murder 2006
- Murder on the Menu 2007
- Dead Men Don't Get the Munchies 2007
- Dying for Dinner 2008
- Murder Has a Sweet Tooth 2009

=== As Casey Daniels ===
Pepper Martin Mystery Series

- Don of the Dead 2006
- The Chick and The Dead 2007
- Tombs of Endearment 2007
- Night of the Loving Dead 2009
- Dead Man Talking 2009
- Tomb with a View 2010
- A Hard Day's Fright 2011
- Wild Wild Death 2012
- Supernatural Born Killers 2012
- Graveyard Shift 2016

A Miss Barnum Mystery

- Smoke and Mirrors 2017

=== As Kylie Logan ===
Button Box Mystery Series

- Button Holed 2011
- Hot Button 2012
- Panic Button 2012
- Buttoned Up 2013

League of Literary Ladies Series

- Mayhem at the Orient Express 2013
- A Tale of Two Biddies 2014
- The Legend of Sleepy Harlow 2014
- And Then There Were Nuns 2016
- Gone with the Twins 2017

Chili Cook-Off Series

- Chili Con Carnage 2013
- Death by Devil's Breath 2014
- Revenge of the Chili Queens 2015

An Ethnic Eats Mystery

- Irish Stewed 2016
- French Fried 2017
- Italian Iced 2018

Jazz Ramsey Series

- The Scent of Murder 2019
- The Secrets of Bones 2020
- A Trail of Lies 2021

=== As Lucy Ness ===
A Haunted Mansion Mystery

- Haunted Homicide 2020
- Phantoms and Felonies 2021

=== As Mimi Granger ===
A Love is Murder Mystery

- Death of a Red-Hot Rancher 2021
- Murder of a Mail-Order Bride 2022

=== As Anastasia Hastings ===
A Dear Miss Hermione Mystery

- Of Manners and Murder 2023

== References and sources ==
- Constance Laux, Connie Lane, and Kylie Logan in Fantastic Fiction
- Author Website
