= Colleen Faulkner =

American author of romance novels

Colleen Faulkner (also known by the alternate pen names Hunter Morgan and V. K. Forrest) is an American author of romance novels. In 1999 she was presented with the "Diamond Award" for literary excellence in the state of Delaware.

== Bibliography ==
Vampire Fia Kahill written as V.K. Forrest

- Eternal
- Undying
- Immortal
