= Joan Johnston =

American novelist

- Born: Little Rock, Arkansas, U.S.
- Education: Jacksonville University (BA); University of Illinois Urbana-Champaign
- Occupation: Author
- Children: 2
- Writing career
- Genre: Historical romance
- Website: www.joanjohnston.com

Joan Johnston (born Little Rock, Arkansas) is an American author of over forty contemporary and historical romance novels.

== Biography ==
Johnston was the third of seven children born to an Air Force sergeant and his music-teacher wife. She received a Bachelor of Arts in theatre arts from Jacksonville University in 1970, then earned an Master's degree in theatre from the University of Illinois at Urbana–Champaign in 1971. She received a J.D. degree (with honors) at the University of Texas at Austin in 1980. For the next five years, Johnston worked as an attorney, serving with the Hunton & Williams firm in Richmond, Virginia, and with Squire, Sanders, & Dempsey in Miami. She has also worked as a newspaper editor and drama critic in San Antonio, Texas, and as a college professor at Southwest Texas Junior College, Barry University, and the University of Miami.

Johnston is a member of the Authors Guild, Novelists, Inc., Romance Writers of America, and Florida Romance Writers. She has two children and divides her time between two homes, in Colorado and Florida.

== Awards ==
- Paperbook Book Club of America's Book Rak Award (twice)
- Romantic Times' Best Western Historical Series Award (twice)
- Romantic Times' Best New Western Writer
- Romantic Times' Best Historical Series Award (twice)
- The Maggie (twice)
- Romance Writers of America RITA Award finalist for The Disobedient Bride

== Bibliography ==
=== Contemporary Romance ===
==== The Bitter Creek Series ====
- "Shameless", 2015
- Shattered, 2009
- A Strangers Game, 2008
- The Next Mrs. Blackthorne, 2005
- The Rivals, 2004
- The Price, 2003
- The Loner, 2002
- The Texan, 2001
- The Cowboy, 2000

==== Hawk's Way ====
- Hawk's Way: Faron and Garth, 2007 (contains: The Cowboy and the Princess, The Wrangler and the Rich Girl)
- Hawk's Way Brides, 2005 (contains: The Unforgiving Bride, The Headstrong Bride, The Disobedient Bride)
- Honey and the Hired Hand, 2004
- Hawk's Way Grooms, 2002 (contains: The Virgin Groom, The Substitute Groom)
- Hawk's Way: The Virgin Groom, 1997
- Hawk's Way: The Substitute Groom, 1998
- Hawk's Way: Rogues, 2001 (Contains Honey and the Hired Hand, The Cowboy Takes a Wife, The Temporary Groom)
- Hawk's Way Bachelors, 2000 (contains: The Rancher and the Runaway Bride, The Cowboy and the Princess, and The Wrangler and the Rich Girl)
- Texas Brides, 2005 (contains: The Rancher and the Runaway Bride and The Bluest Eyes in Texas)
- Big Sky Country, 2004 (contains: Never Tease a Wolf and A Wolf in Sheep's Clothing)
- Sisters Found, 2002

Hawk's Way Original Silhouette Desire Publication Order (and Numbers)

- SD0424 Fit to be Tied (1988)
- SD0489 Marriage by the Book (1989)
- SD0652 Never Tease a Wolf (1991)
- SD0658 A Wolf in Sheep's Clothing (1991)
- SD0710 A Little Time in Texas (1992)
- SD0746 Honey and the Hired Hand (1992)
- SD0779 The Rancher and the Runaway Bride (1993)
- SD0785 The Cowboy and the Princess (1993)
- SD0791 The Wrangler and the Rich Girl (1993)
- SD0842 The Cowboy Takes a Wife (1994)
- SD0878 The Unforgiving Bride (1994)
- SD0896 The Headstrong Bride (1994)
- SD0937 The Disobedient Bride (1995)
- SD1004 The Temporary Groom (1996)
- - - - - - - The Virgin Groom (1997)
- - - - - - - "A Hawk's Way Christmas" (1997) (in Lone Star Christmas anthology with Diana Palmer)
- - - - - - - The Substitute Groom (1998)

==== Category Romance ====
- Fit to be Tied, May 1988, Silhouette Desire #424
- Marriage by the Book, April 1989, Silhouette Desire #489
- Never Tease a Wolf, 1991, Silhouette Desire #652
- A Wolf in Sheep's Clothing, 1991, Silhouette Desire #658
- A Little Time in Texas, May 1992, Silhouette Desire #710
- Honey and the Hired Hand, 1992, Silhouette Desire #746
- The Rancher and the Runaway Bride, April 1993, Silhouette Desire #779
- The Cowboy and the Princess, May 1993, Silhouette Desire #785
- The Wrangler and the Rich Girl, June 1993, Silhouette Desire #791
- The Cowboy Takes a Wife, March 1992, Silhouette Desire #842
- The Unforgiving Bride, September 1994, Silhouette Desire #878
- The Headstrong Bride, December 1994, Silhouette Desire #896
- The Disobedient Bride, July 1995, Silhouette Desire #937
- The Temporary Groom, June 1996, Silhouette Desire #1004

==== Anthologies ====
- "The Bluest Eyes in Texas" in Abduction and Seduction, March 1995
- "Taming the Lone Wolf" in Outlaws and Heroes, Sept 1995
- "A Hawk's Way Christmas" in Lone Star Christmas, Nov 1997

==== Other Contemporary Romance ====
- The Men of Bitter Creek, 2004
- Marriage by the Book, 2003, reprint of Silhouette Desire #489
- A Wolf in Sheep's Clothing, 2002, reprint of Silhouette Desire #658
- Never Tease a wolf, 2001, reprint of Silhouette Desire #652
- Heartbeat, 1997
- I Promise, 1996

=== Historical Romance ===
==== Mail-Order Brides Series ====
- Blackthorne's Bride (Mail-Order Brides #4), July 25, 2017
- Montana Bride (Mail-Order Brides #3), January 7, 2014
- Wyoming Bride (Mail-Order Brides #2), January 1, 2013
- Texas Bride (Mail-Order Brides #1), March 27, 2012

==== The Sisters of the Lone Star ====
- Texas Woman, 2003
- Comanche Woman, 2002
- Frontier Woman, 2001

==== The Captive Heart Series ====
- The Bridegroom, 1999
- The Bodyguard, 1998
- After the Kiss, 1997
- Captive, 1996

==== Anthologies ====
- "One Simple Wish" in Untamed-Maverick Hearts, July 1993
- "The Man from Wolf Creek" in To Have and to Hold, June 1994
- "The Christmas Baby" in A Christmas Together, Oct 1994

==== Other Historicals ====
- The Inheritance, 1995
- Maverick Heart, 1995
- Outlaw's Bride, 1993
- The Barefoot Bride, 1992
- Kid Calhoun, 1993
- Sweetwater Seduction, 1991
- Colter's Wife, 1985
- No Longer a Stranger, 2005
- A Loving Defiance, 1985
