= Anne Stuart (novelist) =

American novelist (born 1948)

- Born: Anne Kristine Stuart; May 2, 1948 (age 78); Philadelphia, Pennsylvania, U.S.
- Occupation: Novelist
- Spouse: Richard Ohlrogge
- Writing career
- Period: 1974–present
- Genre: Romance
- Website: www.anne-stuart.com

Anne Kristine Stuart (born May 2, 1948) is an American romance novelist. She has written over 100 novels and is a recipient of the Romance Writers of America's Lifetime Achievement Award.

== Biography ==
Anne Kristine Stuart was born on May 2, 1948, in Philadelphia, Pennsylvania. Stuart grew up with her parents in Princeton, New Jersey.

Her first book was published in 1974 by Ballantine Press when she was 25 years old. Since then, her books have been published by numerous publishers such as Dell, Doubleday, St. Martin's Press and currently Harlequin.

She and her husband, Richard Ohlrogge, live in northern Vermont.

== Awards ==
- Banish Misfortune: 1986 Rita Awards Best Novel winner
- Falling Angel: 1994 Rita Awards Best Novel winner
- Winter's Edge: 1996 Rita Awards Best Novel winner

== Bibliography ==
=== Single novels ===
- Barrett's Hill (1974)
- Cameron's Landing (Doubleday; 1977)
- Lord Satan's Bride (Dell Publishing; 1981)
- The Spinster and the Rake (Dell Publishing; 1982)
- Chain of Love (1983)
- Heart's Ease (1983)
- Museum Piece (1984)
- Tangled Lies (1984)
- Against the Wind (1985)
- Housebound (1985)
- Banish Misfortune (1985)
- The Rocky Road (1985)
- Bewitching Hour (1986)
- Blue Sage (1987)
- Hand in Glove (1987)
- Partners In Crime (1988)
- Cry for the Moon (1988)
- Seen and Not Heard (1988)
- Special Gifts (1990)
- Chasing Trouble (1991)
- Night of the Phantom (1991)
- Heat Lightning (1992)
- Now You See Him (1992)
- Rafe's Revenge (1992)
- A Rose at Midnight (Avon Books; 1993)
- Break the Night (1993)
- One More Valentine (1993)
- Falling Angel (1993)
- Cinderman (1994)
- To Love a Dark Lord (1994)
- Nightfall (Signet; 1995)
- The Soldier and the Baby (1995)
- Winter's Edge (1995)
- Moonrise (Signet; 1996)
- Shadow Dance (Avon Books; 1997)
- Lord of Danger (Zebra Books; 1997)
- Ritual Sins (Onyx Publishers; August 1997; ISBN 0-451-19252-4)
- Prince of Magic (Zebra Books; 1998)
- The Right Man (1999)
- Shadow Lover (Onyx Publishers; 1999)
- Lady Fortune (Zebra Books; 2000)
- Shadows at Sunset (Mira; 2000)
- Wild Thing (2000)
- The Widow (Mira; 2001)
- Still Lake (Mira; 2002)
- Into the Fire (Mira; 2003)
- Hidden Honor (Mira; 2004)
- Date With A Devil (with Cherry Adair and Muriel Jensen) (Harlequin; 2004)
- The Devil's Waltz (Mira; 2006)
- Silver Falls (2009)

=== The Demon Count Series ===
1. The Demon Count (1980)
2. The Demon Count's Daughter (1980)

=== Catspaw Series ===
1. Catspaw (1985)
2. Catspaw II (1988)
3. Night And Day - Night

=== Maggie Bennett Series ===
1. At the Edge of the Sun (1987)
2. Darkness Before Dawn (1987)
3. Escape Out of Darkness (Dell Paperbacks; 1987)

=== Men at Work Series Multi-Author ===
- Glass Houses (1989)

=== Born in the USA Series Multi-Author ===
- Crazy Like a Fox (1990)

=== Century of American Dreams Series Multi-Author ===
- Angels Wings: 1930s (1990)

=== Here Come the Grooms Series Multi-Author ===
- Lazarus Rising (1990)

=== More Than Men Series Multi-Author ===
- A Dark And Stormy Night (1997)

=== Ice Series ===
1. Black Ice (Mira; 2005)
2. Cold As Ice (Mira; 2006)
3. Ice Blue (Mira; 2007)
4. Ice Storm (Mira; 2007)
5. Fire and Ice (Mira; 2008)
6. On Thin Ice (Mira; 2011)

=== The House of Rohan Series ===
1. The Wicked House of Rohan (ISBN 9781426861055, Mira, July 2010)
2. Ruthless (ISBN 978-0778328483, Mira, August 2010)
3. Reckless (ISBN 978-0778328490, Mira, September 2010)
4. Breathless (ISBN 978-0778328506, Mira, October 2010)
5. Shameless (ISBN 978-0778312970, Mira, June 2011)

=== Collections ===
- Now or Never (1999)
- Looking for Trouble (2000)

=== Omnibus in collaboration ===
- My Valentine (1993) (with Judith Arnold, Anne McAllister and Linda Randall Wisdom)
- To Love and to Honor (1993) (with Stella Cameron, Judith E. French and Linda Lael Miller)
- Dreamscape (1993) (with Bobby Hutchinson and Jayne Ann Krentz)
- Strangers In The Night (1995) (with Maggie Shayne and Chelsea Quinn Yarbro)
- Thieves, Spies, and Other Lovers: Catspaw / Code Name Casanova / in from the Cold (1995) (with Dawn Carroll and Lynn Erickson)
- One Night With a Rogue (1995) (with Kimberly Cates, Christina Dodd, Deborah Martin)
- New Year's Resolution: Husband (1995) (with Rebecca Brandewyne and Carla Neggers)
- New Year's Resolution: Baby (1996) (with Margot Dalton and JoAnn Ross)
- Lovers Dark and Dangerous (1996) (with Heather Graham and Helen R. Myers)
- Summer Love (1997) (with Stella Cameron, Jill Marie Landis and Janelle Taylor)
- Summer Lovers: First, Best and Only / Granite Man / Chain of Love (1998) (with Barbara Delinsky and Elizabeth Lowell)
- The Cupid Connection (1998) (with Cathy Gillen Thacker and Vicki Lewis Thompson)
- Sisters and Secrets (1998) (with Donna Julian, Jodie Larsen and Katherine Stone)
- Dangerous Desires: Too Wild To Wed? / Montana Man / Falling Angel (1999) (with Barbara Delinsky and Jayne Ann Krentz)
- Valentine Affairs (1999) (with Muriel Jensen, Anne McAllister and Linda Randall Wisdom)
- My Secret Admirer (1999) (with Marisa Carroll and Vicki Lewis Thompson)
- Hot Pursuit (1999) (with Joan Johnston and Mallory Rush)
- Valentine Babies (2000) (with Jule McBride and Tara Taylor Quinn)
- Kissing Frosty / Santa in a Stetson (2000) (with Vicki Lewis Thompson)
- What Lies Beneath: The Road to Hidden Harbor / Remember Me / Primal Fear (2002) (with Caroline Burnes and Joanna Wayne)
- Lost in the Night: Real Thing / Heat Lightning / Father: Unknown (2002) (with Barbara Delinsky and Tara Taylor Quinn)
- Kissing Frosty / The Boss, the Baby and the Bride (2002) (with Day Leclaire)
- A Stranger's Kiss (2003) (with Debra Webb)
- Date with a Devil (2004) (with Cherry Adair and Muriel Jensen)
- Undercover Summer (2004) (with Bobby Hutchinson)
- Burning Bright (2004) (with Judith Arnold and Maggie Shayne)
- Midnight Clear / Remembering Red Thunder / Silent Surrender (2004) (with Rita Herron and Sylvie Kurtz)
- Men Made in America Vol 3 (2007) (with Elizabeth Bevarly, Kathleen Creighton, Diana Palmer and Leigh Michaels)
- Men Made in America Vol 4 (2007) (with Curtiss Ann Matlock, Dixie Browning, Emilie Richards and Patricia Rosemoor)

=== Non-fiction ===
- "Legends of Seductive Elegance" essay in Dangerous Men and Adventurous Women: Romance Writers on the Appeal of the Romance (1992, ISBN 0-8122-3192-9, 0-8122-1411-0)

== See also ==
- List of romantic novelists
