= Meagan McKinney =

American novelist

- Born: Ruth Leslie Goodman; 1961 (age 64–65)
- Other name: Ruth Goodman Roberson
- Education: Columbia University
- Occupations: Biologist, novelist
- Years active: 1987–2003
- Children: 2

Ruth Leslie Goodman (born 1961) is an American writer of romance novels who uses the pen name Meagan McKinney.

== Education ==
Goodman studied biology at Columbia University.

== Career ==
Goodman's career began as a biologist for several years. Goodman became a writer professionally and used the pen name Meagan McKinney.

Goodman's first book, My Wicked Enchantress, was a finalist for a Romance Writers of America Golden Medallion.

== Personal life ==
Goodman is divorced and resides with her two children in New Orleans, Louisiana. In November 2010, Goodman pleaded guilty to defrauding FEMA in the wake of Hurricane Katrina. She was sentenced to 3 years in prison.

== Works ==
=== Single novels ===
Title	Publication year	ISBN
No Choice But Surrender	1987	978-0821758595
My Wicked Enchantress	1990	978-0821756614
When Angels Fall	1990	978-0440205210
Till Dawn Tames the Night	1991	978-0440208709
The Ground She Walks Upon	1995	978-0440215790
Gentle from the Night	1997	978-0821758038
A Man to Slay Dragons	1999	978-0821753453
The Fortune Hunter	1998	978-0821760376
In the Dark	1999	978-1575663715
The Merry Widow	2000	978-0821767078
Still of the Night	2001	978-1575666150
Moonlight Becomes Her	2002	978-0821770504
Rendición	2009	978-8492415090

=== Van Alen Family Saga series ===
Title	Publication year	ISBN
Lions and Lace	1988	978-0440212300
Fair is the Rose	1993	978-0385309158

=== Matched in Montana series ===
Series Entry	Title	Publication Date	ISBN
1	The Cowboy Meets His Match	June, 2000	978-0373762996
2	The Lawman Meets His Bride	October, 2000	978-0373271078
3	The M.D. Courts His Nurse	March, 2001	978-0373763542
5 (Note: Book 4 in the series, Cinderella & The Playboy, was written by Laura Wright)	Plain Jane and the Hotshot	February 2002	978-0373764938
6	The Cowboy Claims His Lady	March 2002	978-1426886126
7	Billionaire Boss	April 2003	978-0373765058

=== Anthologies in collaboration ===
The Monk in DANCE WITH THE DEVIL, published October 1997, along with Rexanne Becnel, Anne Logan and Deborah Martin.
