= Maggie Shayne =

American author (born 1962)

- Occupation: Novelist
- Writing career
- Genre: Romance
- Notable works: Sleep With the Lights On, Eternity, Twilight Phantasies, Girl Blue
- Website: maggieshayne.com

Maggie Shayne (born 1965) is an American author who wrote more than 70 novels. Shayne has won multiple awards, including the Romance Writers of America RITA Award, multiple Romantic Times Reviewers' Choice and Career Achievement Awards, The Readers' Choice Award, and the P.E.A.R.L. Award.

== Early life ==
Shayne lived in Syracuse, New York, before moving to Chenango County, New York. She worked as a waitress prior to becoming an author.

As a child, Shayne liked to tell stories and rewrite the endings of books and horror movies. Her first attempt at a novel came when she was older, when she mentally wrote a romance story while trying to comfort a sick baby; she soon transferred the story to a yellow pad. Shayne took a job watching a neighbor's horses so that she could earn the money to buy her first typewriter. She soon finished three manuscripts, which she was unable to sell. Harlequin launched their Shadows Line, and Shayne sent a query letter that said, "I'm just jumping up and down; so happy that you have created a line especially for me!" Although the editor rejected that book, Shayne's second book was purchased. The novel became the first of Shayne's Wings in the Night series, which she continued writing even after the Shadows Line was closed.

== Career ==
Shayne has had over 70 novels published, including women's fiction, thrillers, romantic suspense, paranormal, and category romance. She has also published several non-fiction titles in the area of spiritual self-help. She has written for five publishers including Avon Books, St. Martin's Press, Penguin Putnam, Spilled Candy Books, and MIRA Books. Her paranormal romances combine romance and horror, where the redemption of the monster is through love. Many of her novels "[blend] mysticism into everyday life in a good vs. evil scenario."

Shayne also worked as a writer for the soap operas Guiding Light and As the World Turns and considered accepting the position of co-head-writer before deciding to devote her time to her novels.

Shayne's novels have appeared on the USA Today, Booksense and Waldenbooks bestseller lists, and Twilight Hunger reached Number 18 on the New York Times Bestseller List. Many of her books have been chosen by Doubleday Bookclub, the Mystery Guild, and Rhapsody Bookclub. On her thirteenth nomination for a Romance Writers of America RITA Award, Shayne won the award. She has also won three Career Achievement Awards from Romantic Times Bookclub Magazine.

== Personal life ==
Shayne has interest in the culture and religion of ancient Sumer, and included some of her research in her novels, including Destiny. After several years of study at the Black Forest Clan, a chartered Wiccan seminary, Shayne became a high priestess and an elder in the Wicca religion and has been licensed as a minister. Shayne founded her own coven, the Hawks of RavenMyst, in a tradition, similar to a denomination, known as the RavenMyst Circle, that she helped found.

Shayne has five grown daughters. She married Lance on Valentine's Day in 2014. She resides in a small town in upstate New York.

== Awards ==
- 1992–1993 — Romantic Times Reviewers' Choice Award, Best First Book, Reckless Angel
- 1993 — New Jersey Romance Writers Golden Leaf Award for Best Long Contemporary, Miranda's Viking
- 1993–1994 — Romantic Times Career Achievement Award, Series Romantic Fantasy
- 1993–1994 – Affaire de Coeur Magazine Favorite Paranormal Author of the Year
- 1995–1996 — Romantic Times Career Achievement Award, Romantic Fantasy
- 1995–1995 — Romantic Times Reviewers' Choice Award, Best Contemporary Fantasy, Fairytale
- 1997–1998 — Romantic Times Reviewers' Choice Award, Best Mini-Series Romance, A Husband in Time
- 1997–1998 — Romantic Times Reviewers' Choice Award, Best Contemporary Fantasy, Forever Enchanted
- 2005 — Romance Writers of America RITA Award winner, Best Novella, "Her Best Enemy"
- Romantic Times Magazine Women in Search of Heroes (wISH) Award, Twilight Illusions
- Romantic Times Magazine WISH Award, Born in Twilight
- Romantic Times Gold Medallion Award, Twilight Illusions
- Romantic Times Gold Medallion Award, Forever Enchanted
- Six-time Romance Writers of America RITA Award finalist (12-time nominee)

== Bibliography ==
=== Wings in the Night Series ===
1. Twilight Phantasies
2. Twilight Memories
3. Twilight Illusions
4. Beyond Twilight
5. Born in Twilight
6. Twilight Vows
7. Twilight Hunger
8. Run from Twilight
9. Embrace the Twilight
10. Edge of Twilight
  - 10.5. Before Blue Twilight
11. Blue Twilight
12. Prince of Twilight
13. Demon's Kiss
14. Lovers Bite
15. Angel's Pain
16. Bloodline
17. Vampires in Paradise
18. Twilight Prophecy
  - 18.5. Vacation with a Vampire...and Other Immortals
19. Twilight Fulfilled
20. Twilight Guardians
21. Twilight Vendetta
22. The Rhiannon Chronicles
23. Fear the Reaper
24. Young Rhiannon in the Temple of Isis

=== Wings in the Night: Reborn Series ===
1. Twilight Guardians
  - 1.5. Edge of Darkness
2. Twilight Vendetta
3. Rhiannon Chronicles
4. The Fiona Files

=== Fairies of Rush Series ===
1. By Magic Beguiled
2. By Magic Enchanted
3. Annie's Hero
4. The Fairy's Wish

=== Texas Brands Series ===
1. The Littlest Cowboy (in A Brand of Christmas and The Texas Brand: In the Beginning)
2. The Baddest Virgin in Texas (in The Texas Brand: In the Beginning)
3. Badlands Bad Boy (in The Texas Brand: In the Beginning)
4. Long Gone Lonesome Blues FORMERLY The Husband She Couldn't Remember
5. The Lone Cowboy FORMERLY That Mysterious Texas Brand Man
6. Lone Star Lonely FORMERLY The Baddest Bride in Texas
7. The Outlaw Bride
8. Texas Angel FORMERLY Angel Meets the Badman
9. Texas Homecoming FORMERLY The Homecoming

=== The Immortal Series ===
1. Eternity
2. Infinity
3. Destiny
4. Immortality
- 0.5. Immortality

=== Oklahoma All-Girl Brands Series ===
1. The Brands Who Came for Christmas (in A Brand of Christmas and Stranger in Town)
2. Brand-New Heartache (in Stranger in Town)
3. Secrets and Lies
4. A Mommy For Christmas FORMERLY Feels Like Home
5. One Magic Summer FORMERLY Dangerous Lover
6. Sweet Vidalia Brand

=== Mordecai Young Series ===
1. Thicker Than Water
2. Colder Than Ice
3. Darker Than Midnight

=== Secrets of Shadow Falls Series ===
1. Killing Me Softly
2. Kill Me Again
3. Kiss Me, Kill Me
- 3.5. Kiss Me Goodbye

=== The Portal Series ===
- 0.5. Legacy of the Witch
- 1. Mark of the Witch
- 2. Daughter of the Spellcaster
- 3. Blood of the Sorceress

=== Brown and de Luca Series ===
1. Sleep with the Lights On
2. Wake to Darkness
3. Innocent Prey
4. Deadly Obsession
5. Girl Blue
- 1.5. Dream of Danger
- 4.5. Cry Wolf

=== The Shattered Sisters Series ===
1. Reckless FORMERLY Reckless Angel
2. Forgotten FORMERLY Forgotten Vows
3. Broken FORMERLY Kiss of the Shadow Man
4. Hollow FORMERLY The Bride Wore a Forty-Four
5. Hunted

=== The McIntyre Men ===
Also called Bliss in Big Falls.

1. Oklahoma Christmas Blues
2. Oklahoma Moonshine
3. Oklahoma Starshine FORMERLY Oklahoma Sunlight
4. Shine on Oklahoma FORMERLY Oklahoma Starlight
5. Christmas Blues (in Buckles, Boots and Mistletoe and Baby By Christmas)

=== Shayne's Supernaturals ===
1. Forgotten
2. Magic by Moonlight FORMERLY Musketeer by Moonlight
3. Miranda's Viking
4. Everything She Does is Magic
5. Stargazer FORMERLY Out-of-This-World Marriage
6. Witch Moon
7. Zombies! A Love Story

=== Novels ===
- Forever, Dad
- A Husband in Time
- Million Dollar Marriage
- The Gingerbread Man
- Enemy Mind
- That Mysterious Man

=== Anthologies and collections ===
Anthology or Collection	Contents	Publication Date	With
Forgotten Vows	Forgotten Vows	1994	Lindsay McKenna
Strangers In The Night	Beyond Twilight	Oct 1995	Anne Stuart, Chelsea Quinn Yarbro
A Sprinkle of Fairy Dust	Fairies Make Wishes, Too	Sep 1996	Elizabeth Bevarly, Elaine Crawford, Marylyle Rogers
Bewitched	Everything She Does Is Magick	Oct 1997	Lisa Higdon, Susan Krinard, Amy Saunders
Brides of the Night	Twilight Vows	Sep 1998	Marilyn Tracy
Moonglow	Musketeer by Moonlight	Oct 1998	Lindsay Longford, Angie Ray and Katherine Sutcliffe
Silhouette Sensational: Forgotten Vows...? / License to Love / Cowboy Daddy / Babies On His Mind	Forgotten Vows	Mar 1999	Barbara Boswell, Marie Ferrarella, Susan Mallery
Veils of Time	The Con and the Crusader	Jul 1999	Lynn Kurland, Angie Ray and Ingrid Weaver
Sinful	Leather and Lace	Jan 2000	Suzanne Forster, Lori Foster, Kimberly Randell
After Midnight	Miranda's Viking Kiss of the Shadow Man Out-of-This-World Marriage	Aug 2000	
Wings in the Night	Twilight Phantasies Twilight Memories Twilight Illusions	Nov 2001	
Who Do You Love?	Two Hearts	Sep 2000	Marilyn Pappano
Two Novels	Witch Moon Rising	Apr 2001	Lorna Tedder
Out of This World	Immortality	Aug 2001	Laurell K. Hamilton, Susan Krinard, J D Robb
The Texas Brand: In the Beginning	The Littlest Cowboy The Baddest Virgin in Texas Badlands Bad Boy	Sep 2001	
At Twilight	Born in Twilight Beyond Twilight	Feb 2002	
Broken Silence	The Invisible Virgin	Apr 2003	Eileen Wilks and Anne Marie Winston
Hot Summer Nights		Jun 2003	Lindsay McKenna, Dallas Schulze
Midnight Pleasures	Under Her Spell	Nov 2003	Amanda Ashley, Sherrilyn Kenyon and Ronda Thompson
Pregnant With His Child	The Baddest Virgin in Texas	Jan 2004	Marilyn Pappano
Danger in the Shadows		May 2004	Linda Turner
Special Delivery: Doorstep Babies	The Littlest Cowboy	Jun 2004	Cathy Gillen Thacker
Stranger in Town	The Brands Who Came for Christmas Brand-New Heartache	Jul 2004	
Hot Blooded	Awaiting Moonrise	Aug 2004	Christine Feehan, Emma Holly and Angela Knight
Twilight Begins	Twilight Phantasies Twilight Memories	Sep 2004	
Man of My Dreams	Daydream Believer	Oct 2004	Suzanne Forster, Virginia Kantra, Sherrilyn Kenyon
Night's Edge	Her Best Enemy	Oct 2004	Barbara Hambly, Charlaine Harris
Burning Bright	Return of the Light	Oct 2004	Judith Arnold and Anne Stuart
An Expected Family	Forever, Dad	Nov 2004	Caroline Cross
Kick Ass	The Bride Wore a .44	Sep 2005	Mary Janice Davidson, Jacey Ford, Angela Knight
Two By Twilight	Twilight Vows Run from Twilight	Sep 2005	
Moon Fever	The Darkness Within	Sep 2007	Lori Handeland, Caridad Piñeiro, and Susan Sizemore
Wings in the Night Part 1	Twilight Phantasies Twilight Memories Twilight Illusions Beyond Twilight Born in Twilight Twilight Vows	Sep 2007	
An Enchanted Season	Melting Frosty	Oct 2007	Jean Johnson, Erin McCarthy and Nalini Singh
Wings in the Night Part 2	Twilight Hunter Embrace the Twilight Run From Twilight Edge of Twilight Blue Twilight Prince of Twilight	Nov 2007	
Eternal Love	Eternity Infinity	Nov 2007	
Immortal Desire	Destiny Immortality	Dec 2007	
Weddings from Hell	Till Death	May 2008	Jeaniene Frost, Terri Garey and Kathryn Smith
Hearts of Darkness	Love Me to Death	Jan 2010	Susan Krinard and Gena Showalter
Darkness Divine	Voodoo	Sep 2010	P.C. Cast, Rhyannon Byrd and Gena Showalter
The Heart of Winter	The Toughest Girl in Town	Dec 2010	Linda Winstead Jones and Day Leclaire
Paranormal Holiday Anthology Trio	Melting Frosty	Dec 2010	Jean Johnson, Erin McCarthy and Nalini Singh
Vampires In Paradise/Immortal	Vampires in Paradise	Mar 2012	
Eternal Love: The Immortal Witch Series	Eternity Infinity Destiny	Mar 2014	
Once Upon a Time	Fairytale Forever Enchanted	Jun 2014	
Edge of Darkness	Dead By Twilight	Aug 2015	Christine Feehan and Lori Herter
A Brand of Christmas	The Brands Who Came for Christmas The Littlest Cowboy	Oct 2015	
Buckles, Boots and Mistletoe	Christmas Blues	Dec 2015	Miranda’s Shayne, River Shayne and Jessica Lewis
Baby By Christmas	Christmas Blues	Nov 2017	
Brown and de Luca Collection Volume 1	Sleep with the Lights On Dream of Danger Wake to Darkness	Jul 2019	
Brown and de Luca Collection Volume 2	Innocent Prey Deadly Obsession	Sep 2019	

== See also ==
- Judy Harrow
- List of occult writers
- List of romantic novelists
- Margot Adler
- Murry Hope
- Neopaganism
