= Barbara Delinsky =

American novelist

- Born: Barbara Ruth Greenberg; August 9, 1945 (age 81); Boston, Massachusetts, U.S.
- Education: Tufts University (BA); Boston College (MA)
- Occupations: Novelist, Non-fiction writer
- Writing career
- Pen name: Barbara Delinsky; Bonnie Drake; Billie Douglass
- Period: 1981–present
- Genres: literary fiction, drama
- Subject: Breast Cancer
- Notable work: Twilight Whispers
- Notable awards: Golden Medallion – Single Title Romance; 1988 Twilight Whispers
- Website: www.barbaradelinsky.com

Barbara Delinsky (born Barbara Ruth Greenberg on August 9, 1945) is an American writer of romance novels, including 19 New York Times bestsellers. She has also been published under the pen names Bonnie Drake and Billie Douglass.

== Biography ==
Delinsky was born on August 9, 1945, in Boston, Massachusetts. Her mother died when she was eight.

In 1963, she graduated from Newton High School, in Newton, Massachusetts. She then went on to earn a B.A. in Psychology from Tufts University and an M.A. in Sociology at Boston College.

Delinsky married Steve Delinsky, a law student, when she was very young. During the first years of her marriage, she worked for the Massachusetts Society for the Prevention of Cruelty to Children. After the birth of her first child, she took a job as a photographer and reporter for the Belmont Herald newspaper. She also filled her time doing volunteer work at hospitals, and serving on the Board of Directors of the Friends of the Massachusetts General Hospital Cancer Center and their Women's Cancer Advisory Board.

In 1980, after having twins, Delinsky read an article about three female writers, and decided to try putting her imagination on paper. After three months of researching, plotting, and writing, she sold her first book. She began publishing for Dell Publishing Company (Candlelight Ecstasy Romance) as Billie Douglass, for Silhouette Books (S. Intimate Moments and S. Desire) as Billie Douglass, and for Harlequin Enterprises as Barbara Delinsky. Now, she only uses her married name Barbara Delinsky, and some of her novels published under the other pseudonyms, are being published under this name. Since then, over 30 million copies of her books are in print, and they have been published in 25 languages. One of her novels, A Woman's Place, was made into a Lifetime movie starring Lorraine Bracco.

In 2001, Delinsky branched out into nonfiction with the book Uplift: Secrets from the Sisterhood of Breast Cancer Survivors. A breast cancer survivor herself, Barbara donates the proceeds of that book and her second nonfiction work to charity. With those funds she has been able to fund an oncology fellowship at the Massachusetts General Hospital that trains breast surgeons.

The Delinsky family resides in Newton, Massachusetts. Steve Delinsky has become a reputed lawyer of the city, while she writes daily in her office above the garage at her home.

== Bibliography ==
=== As Bonnie Drake ===
==== Single novels ====
- The Passionate Touch (1981)
- Surrender by Moonlight (1981)
- Sweet Ember (1981)
- Sensuous Burgundy (1981)
- The Ardent Protector (1982)
- Whispered Promise (1982)
- Lilac Awakening (1982)
- Amber Enchantment (1982)
- Lover From the Sea (1983)
- The Silver Fox (1983)
- Passion and Illusion (1983)
- Gemstone (1983)
- Moment to Moment (1984)

=== As Billie Douglass ===
==== Single novels ====
- Search for a New Dawn (1982)
- A Time to Love (1982)
- Knightly Love (1982)
- Sweet Serenity (1982)
- The Carpenter's Lady (1983)
- Fast Courting (1983)
- Flip Side of Yesterday (1983)
- Beyond Fantasy (1983)
- An Irresistible Impulse (1983)
- Variation on a Theme (1984)

=== As Barbara Delinsky ===
Some of her novels published under the other pseudonyms, are being published under her real name.

==== Single novels ====
- Bronze Mystique (1984)
- Finger Prints (1984)
- Secret of the Stone (1985)
- Chances Are (1985)
- First Things First (1985)
- Threats and Promises (1986)
- Straight from the Heart (1986)
- Within Reach (1986)
- First, Best and Only (1986)
- Jasmine Sorcery (1986)
- Twilight Whispers (1987)
- Cardinal Rules (1987)
- Heat Wave (1987)
- Commitments (1988)
- T.L.C. (Tender Loving Care) (1988)
- Through My Eyes (1989)
- Heart of the Night (1989)
- Montana Man (1989)
- Having Faith (1990)
- Facets (1990)
- A Woman Betrayed (1991)
- The Stud (1991)
- The Outsider (1992)
- The Passions of Chelsea Kane (1992)
- More Than Friends (1993)
- Suddenly (1994)
- For My Daughters (1994)
- Together Alone (1995)
- Shades of Grace (1995)
- A Woman's Place (1997)
- Father Figure (1997)
- Three Wishes (1997)
- Coast Road (1998)
- Lake News (1999)
- The Vineyard (2000)
- The Woman Next Door (2001)
- An Accidental Woman (2002)
- Flirting with Pete (2003)
- The Summer I Dared (2004)
- Looking for Peyton Place (2005)
- Family Tree (2007)
- The Secret Between Us (2008)
- While My Sister Sleeps (2009)
- Not My Daughter (2010)
- Escape (2012)
- Warm Hearts (2012)
- Love Songs (2013)
- Sweet Salt Air (2013)
- Blueprints (2015)
- Before and Again (2018)
- A Week at the Shore (2020)

==== Something Forever Series ====
1. A Special Something (1984)
2. The Forever Instinct (1984)
- A Special Something / The Forever Instinct (Omnibus) (1991)

==== Victoria Lesser Series (The Matchmaker Trilogy) ====
1. The Real Thing (1986)
2. Twelve Across (1987) (Later published as Crossed Hearts)
3. A Single Rose (1987) (Later published as The Invitation)
- A Collection: The Real Thing / Twelve Across / Single Rose (Omnibus) (1994)

==== The Dream: Crosslyn Rise Series ====
1. The Dream (1990)
2. The Dream Unfolds (1990)
3. The Dream Comes True (1990)
- Dreams (omnibus) (1999) (The Dream / The Dream Unfolds / The Dream Comes True)

==== Blake Sisters Series ====
1. Lake News (1999)
2. An Accidental Woman (2002)

==== Montclair Emeralds Series multi-author ====
4. Fulfillment (1988)

==== Collections ====
- Three Complete Novels: A Woman Betrayed / Within Reach / Finger Prints (1993)
- Sensuous Burgundy / Gemstone (1997)
- Passion and Illusion / The Carpenter's Lady (1998)
- Rekindled: Lilac Awakening / Flip Side of Yesterday (1998)
- Bronze Mystique / Secrets in Silence (2001)
- Passion: Chances Are / Be Mine, Valentine / Mingled Hearts / Dazzle / Married to the Enemy (2002)
- Coast Road / Three Wishes (2007)
- Trust: The Real Thing / Secret of the Stone (2008)

==== Short stories ====
- "Sunlight and Joy" (2011)
- "The Right Wrong Number" (2013)
- "What She Really Wants" (2015)

==== Omnibus in collaboration ====
- With This Ring (1991) (with Bethany Campbell, Bobby Hutchinson and Anne McAllister)
- Threats and Promises & Her Secret Pash by Amanda Stevens (1993)
- Expecting! (1996) (The Stud by Delinsky, / Question of Pride by Michelle Reid / Little Magic Rita Clay Estrada)
- Forever Yours (1997) (Threats and Promises by Delinsky / The Aristocrat by Catherine Coulter / Loving Evangeline by Linda Howard)
- Heart and Soul (1998) (The Dream by Delinsky / All That Sparkles by Stella Cameron / Independent Wife by Linda Howard)
- Heatwave (1998) (Part of the Bargain by Linda Lael Miller / The Dream Unfolds by Delinsky / Under the Knife by Tess Gerritsen)
- Summer Lovers (1998) (First, Best and Only by Delinsky / Granite Man by Elizabeth Lowell / Chain of Love by Anne Stuart)
- Dangerous Desires (1999) (Too Wild To Wed? by Jayne Ann Krentz / Montana Man by Delinsky / Falling Angel by Anne Stuart)
- Meant to Be (2001) (Dreams by Jayne Ann Krentz / Waiting Game by Delinsky / Perfect Husband by Kristine Rolofson)
- Bronze Mystique & Secrets in Silence by Gayle Wilson (2001)
- Father of the Bride & Handsome as Sin by Kelsey Roberts (2001)
- Take 5: Chances Are / Be Mine, Valentine / Mingled Hearts / Dazzle / Married to the Enemy (2002) (with Vicki Lewis Thompson and Ann Major)
- Lost in the Night (2002) (The Real Thing by Delinsky / Heat Lightening by Tara Taylor Quinn / Father: Unknown by Anne Stuart)
- In Too Deep (2003) (Having Faith by Barbara Delinsky / It Takes a Rebel by Stephanie Bond)
- Family Passions (2004) (with Tess Gerritsen)

=== Non-fiction ===
- Uplift: Secrets from the Sisterhood of Breast Cancer Survivors (2001, 2005)
- Does A Lobsterman Wear Pants? (2005)

== Awards ==
- 1988 - Romance Writers of America Golden Medallion, Single Title Romance – Twilight Whispers
- Commitments: 1988 RT Reviewers' Choice - Contemporary Novel winner
- Heart of the Night: 1989 RT Reviewers' Choice - Contemporary Romantic Suspense winner
- A Woman's Place: A TRR 5 Heart Keeper
