= Gone to the Dogs =

- To "go to the dogs" is to decline or deteriorate.

Gone to the Dogs may also refer to:

== Books ==
- Gone to the Dogs (Emily Carmichael novel), a 2003 teen novel
- Going to the Dogs: The Story of a Moralist, English title of the 1931 novel Fabian. Die Geschichte eines Moralisten by Erich Kästner
- Gone to the Dogs, a 1984 children's book by John Rowe Townsend
- Going to the Dogs, a 1987 novel by Julian Barnes writing as Dan Kavanagh
- Gone to the Dogs, a 1992 Dog Lover's Mysteries novel by Susan Conant
- Gone to the Dogs, a 1994 book by Robin Page about the BBC TV series One Man and His Dog
- Gone to the Dogs: Life with My Canine Companions, a 2004 autobiographical work by Robert F. Jones completed by Louise Jones

== Film, theatre and TV ==
=== Film ===
- Gone to the Dogs (1939 film), a musical comedy film starring George Wallace
- Gone to the Dogs (2006 film), a comedy film directed by Philip Barnard
- Gone to the Dogs, a 1952 film starring Ouyang Sha-fei
- Gone to the Dogs, a 2008 film written and directed by Liz Tuccillo

=== Television ===
- Gone to the Dogs (TV series), a 1991 comedy-drama miniseries that aired in the UK
- "Gone to the Dogs", a 1970 episode of the cartoon series Harlem Globetrotters (TV series)
- "Gone to the Dogs", a segment of a 1979 episode of the cartoon series Casper and the Angels
- "Going to the Dogs", a 1982 episode of the American animated TV series Meatballs & Spaghetti
- "Going to the Dogs", a 1983 segment of an episode of the American comedy/drama TV series The Love Boat
- "Going to the Dogs", a 1995 episode of the MTV reality TV series Road Rules: USA – The First Adventure
- "Gone to the Dogs", a 1997 episode of the American children's series Kidsongs
- "Gone to the Dogs", a 2003 episode of the Australian outback drama McLeod's Daughters (season 3)
- "Gone to the Dogs", a segment of a 2006 episode of the American cartoon series Four Eyes!
- "Gone to the Dogs", a segment of a 2006 episode of the French cartoon series Watch My Chops! (in the U.S.: Corneil & Bernie)
- "Gone to the Dogs", a 2007 episode of the Canadian animated TV series Carl²
- "Gone to the Dogs", a 2008 episode of the American reality TV show Ace of Cakes
- "Gone to the Dogs", a 2008 episode of the British reality TV show Sky Cops
- "Gone to the Dogs", a 2010 episode of the reality show Wa$ted! (American TV series)
- "Going to the Dogs", a 2011 episode of the American reality TV series Million Dollar Listing Los Angeles
- "This Show Has Gone to the Dogs!", a 2013 episode of the American reality TV show The Good Buy Girls
- "Going to the Dogs", a 2014 episode of the animated online web series Barbie: Life in the Dreamhouse
- "Going to the Dogs", a 2014 episode of the American reality TV show Mystery Diners
- "Gone to the Dogs", a 2018 episode of the Australian comedy series The Bureau of Magical Things
- "Gone to the Dogs", a two-part 2018 episode of the American animated web series DC Super Hero Girls
- "Gone to the Dogs", a segment of a 2018 episode of the Canadian CGI-animated series Snowsnaps (French: Les Mini-Tuques)
- "Gone to the Dogs", a segment of a 2021 episode of the American CGI-animated series The Chicken Squad
- "Gone to the Dogs", a 2022 episode of the American CGI-animated series Barbie: It Takes Two

=== Theatre ===
- Going to the dogs, a 1986 "play" of 46 minutes with six well-trained Alsatian dogs directed by Wim T. Schippers

== Music ==
=== Songs ===
- "Cat That's Gone to the Dogs", a track on the 1986 album Swamp of Love by the Canadian band Deja Voodoo
- "Gone to the Dogs", a track on the 1991 album Play (Squeeze album)
- "Gone to the Dogs", a track on the 1994 album Nordic Quartet by English saxophonist John Surman
- "Gone to the Dogs", a track on the 1996 album Demmamussabebonk (UK release) by English punk rock band Snuff
- "Gone to the Dogs", a track on the 1999 album Can't Get There from Here by Great White
- "Christmas is Going to the Dogs", a song from the 2000 soundtrack by Eels of How the Grinch Stole Christmas (2000 film)
- "Gone to the Dogs", a track on the 2006 album KT Tunstall's Acoustic Extravaganza
- "Gone with the Dogs", a track in the 2006 boxed set Sonic's Rendezvous Band (album)
