= Becnel =

Becnel is a surname. Notable people with the surname include:

- Barbara Becnel (born 1950), American author, journalist, and film producer
- Rexanne Becnel, American romance novelist

== See also ==
- Becel
