= Christmas Wish =

Christmas Wish may refer to:

== Literature ==
- The Christmas Wish, a 1993 novel by Rexanne Becnel
- A Christmas Wish, a 1994 novel by Betty Neels
- The Christmas Wish, a 1996 novel by Richard M. Siddoway
- The Christmas Wish, a 2001 novel by Debbie Raleigh
- A Christmas Wish, a 2002 novel by Celeste O. Norfleet
- A Christmas Wish, a 2003 picture book by Marcus Sedgwick

== Music ==
- Christmas Wish (EP), a 2001 EP by Stacie Orrico
- Christmas Wish (Olivia Newton-John album), 2007
- Christmas Wish (Gina Jeffreys album), 1999
- Christmas Wish, a 2013 EP by Willie Revillame
- Christmas Wish, a song by NRBQ

== See also ==
- Christmas Wishes (disambiguation)
- The Christmas Wish, a 1998 American made-for-television film
