= Dairy Council of California =

Dairy Council of California provides free nutrition education programs to California children and adults through teachers and health professionals. In addition, the Dairy Council of California provides a Mobile Dairy Classroom, a free outdoor assembly with a live cow. The organization also provides consumers with nutrition information through a website, HealthyEating.org.

The Dairy Council of California strives to help consumers make food choices that match individual values and contribute to optimal health. Nutrition education efforts use a total diet approach inclusive of all five food groups identified in the USDA MyPlate food guidance system (grains, vegetables, fruits, milk and meat and beans).

As a state government entity, Dairy Council of California is funded by California's dairy farmers and milk processors through assessments collected by the California Department of Food and Agriculture.

== History of organization ==
The Dairy Council of California (formerly called California Dairy Council) was established on February 8, 1919. The organization was conceived during San Francisco Bay ferryboat commuter trips by two well-known California dairy industry leaders, Sam H. Greene and Chester Earl Gray after reading about discoveries in the field of nutrition in the early 1900s. Two articles published in Hoards Dairyman specifically caught their attention, "The Present Situation in Nutrition" and "The Dairy Industry and Human Welfare" written by Dr. E.V. McCollum from the University of Wisconsin who discovered vitamin A. McCollum characterized vitamin A as a "vital life substance in dairy fat".

Other significant events happening in the country at this time include the formation of the California Farm Bureau Federation and the formation of the National Dairy Council in 1915. Cities around the country were experimenting with school feeding programs in the early 1900s. All these events inspired Greene and Gray to bridge the link between nutrition science and dairy products that led to the formation of the non-profit organization California Dairy Council, made up of volunteer producers and distributors. They saw an opportunity to provide service for the public as well as the dairy industry.

Sam H Greene was the first secretary-manager and F. J. Cummings was the first president of the newly formed California Dairy Council. Greene served as manager of the California Dairy Council for 30 years. Dairy Council's first order of business upon formation was a statewide survey of school nutrition. California Dairy Council worked with schools and teachers to survey 130,000 school children and found that on average 36% of children in cities did not receive milk on a regular basis. The results of this survey were instrumental in adding milk to the school lunch menu. By 1922, California Dairy Council implemented a school milk service to nearly every major city in the state. By 1950, per capita daily milk consumption increased by nearly 25 percent.

The 1920s and 30s brought the California Dairy Council's first big strides in nutrition education, beginning with the "Dairy Product for Health" campaign targeting PTA parents. It was a time when many children had rickets and other nutritional deficiencies. "We gave people something of real value without expecting anything in return," said Greene of his efforts. "We did this in the firm belief that when facts about our products reached the people in the form of education, we would reap our rewards in increased use of milk and other dairy products."

The Mobile Dairy Classroom began in the 1930s as a joint venture between the California Dairy Council and Venice, CA dairyman Clarence Michel of Edgemar Farms. Michel would travel weekly to Los Angeles-area schools in a truck built to accommodate a live cow and teach children how milk and dairy foods were produced. After World War II, the Dairy Council teamed with Los Angeles City Schools and hired a professional teacher to increase the program's educational impact. Ultimately, the program expanded to include 5 trucks and is available throughout most of California.

In 1945, the California Dairy Council was reorganized by the California State Legislature through establishment of the California Dairy Industry Advisory Board. This newly formed board adopted the principles of California Dairy Council and began working closely with the National Dairy Council. Alfred H Ghormley served as the first chairman of the board and Richard Werner was the first manager. The California Dairy Council continued but as a sub-unit of the California Industry Advisory Board.

In 1961, the California Dairy Council (Joe Hart, president) relinquished its name to the California Dairy Industry Advisory Board and the Advisory Board became the Dairy Council of California, giving it a better identification with the educational material used from the National Dairy Council. W. B Woodburn was manager and A.W. Clark was chairman of the board of the newly named Dairy Council of California.

By 1963 the Dairy Council of California had grown to employ 19 staff members in five offices. The work of the Dairy Council of California expanded beyond schools to include youth clubs, banks, hospitals, medical conventions, and nursing schools.

== History of program development ==
Beginning in the 1960s, under the direction of Doug Fisk, Manager, the Dairy Council of California developed comprehensive two-week programs designed to promote behavior change. The Director of Education, Rus Shortridge worked with the well known teacher, Madeline Hunter from UCLA University Elementary School to develop the educational methodology behind the new programs. The Madeline Hunter mastery teaching education methodology became the basis of four new Dairy Council of California programs: Little Ideas for Pre-School Children; Big Ideas Balanced Meals for Second Grade; Daily Food Choices for Fifth Grade; and Big Ideas for Consumers for high school students.

== Programs and resources ==
Dairy Council of California provides free resources to California teachers and qualified health and wellness providers in California. Nutrition lesson plans for each grade level are developed with a behavior-change model and align to Common Core State Standards. Self-instructional booklets are designed for adults to teach them about healthy eating from all five food groups. Free downloads, handouts and healthy recipes are available at HealthyEating.org. In addition, continuing education nutrition resources are offered along with nutrition trends and the latest research. The nutritional properties and health benefits of milk and dairy foods are also outlined.

== See also ==
- Agriculture in California
