= Anne McAllister =

American novelist

Barbara Schenck
- Born: California, United States
- Occupation: Novelist
- Writing career
- Pen name: Anne McAllister
- Period: 1985–present
- Genre: Romantic novel
- Notable works: Cowboy Pride, The Stardust Cowboy
- Notable awards: RITA award – Short Contemporary Series Romance; 1997 Cowboy Pride; RITA award – Short Contemporary Romance; 2000 The Stardust Cowboy
- Website: www.annemcallister.com

Barbara Schenck under the pseudonym Anne McAllister is an American best-selling writer of over 55 romance novels since 1985. She is a two time winner of the Romance Writers of America's RITA Award.

== Biography ==
Barbara Schenck was born in California, but spent time on her grandparents' ranch in Colorado and visiting relatives in Montana. She met her husband through her job at a university library, and they have been married for over thirty years. The couple have four children. They live in Iowa but spends much time in Montana.

McAllister holds a master's degree in theology. Before she began writing, she held jobs as a Spanish teacher, copyediting textbooks, and ghostwriting sermons. Her novels have been published in the Harlequin Presents, Silhouette Desire, Special Edition, and Harlequin American category romance lines. She has twice won the Romance Writers of America RITA Award, and has been a finalist an additional seven times. In 2000, she was awarded the Romantic Times Career Achievement Award as Series Author of the Year. She has also been awarded several Romantic Times Reviewers' Choice Awards.

== Bibliography ==
=== Single novels ===
- Lightning Storm (1985)
- Dare to Trust (1985)
- Starstruck (1985)
- Dream Chasers (1987)
- To Tame a Wolf (1987)
- Marriage Trap (1987)
- Saving Grace (1989)
- Once a Hero (1989)
- Out of Bounds (1990)
- Island Interlude (1991)
- Call Up the Wind (1992)
- A Cowboy for Christmas (1992)
- Catch Me If You Can (1993)
- The Alexakis Bride (1994)
- Eight Second Wedding (1994)
- New Years Resolution Family (1998)
- The Playboy and the Nanny (1998)
- The Antonides Marriage Deal (2006)
- The Boss's Wife for a Week (2007)
- The Santorini Bride (2007)
- Antonides' Forbidden Wife (2008)
- Savas' Defiant Mistress (2009)
- One-Night Mistress... Convenient Wife (2009)
- The Virgin's Proposition (2010)
- Hired By Her Husband (2010)
- Breaking the Greek's Rules (2012)
- The Return of Antonides (2015)
- Valentine Charms (2018)

=== Quicksilver Season Series ===
1. Quicksilver Season (1985)
2. A Chance of Rainbows (1985)
3. Body and Soul (1987)
4. Marry Sunshine (1988)
5. Gifts of the Spirit (1988)

=== Imagine Series ===
1. Imagine (1990)
2. I Thee Wed (1991)
3. Marry-go-round in With This Ring (1991)
4. MacKenzie's Baby (1992)
5. Never Say Never in New Year's (1998)
6. Marry Me... Maybe? (Omnibus) (2004) (with Tori Carrington)

=== Code Of The West Series ===
1. Cowboys Don't Cry (1995)
2. Cowboys Don't Quit (1995)
3. Cowboys Don't Stay (1995)
4. The Cowboy and the Kid (1996)
5. Cowboy Pride (1996)
6. A Cowboy's Tears (1997)
7. The Cowboy Steals a Lady (1997)
8. The Cowboy Crashes a Wedding (1998)
9. The Stardust Cowboy (1999)
10. Cowboy on the Run (1999)
11. A Cowboy's Secret (2000)
12. A Cowboy's Gift (2000)
13. A Cowboy's Promise (2001)
14. The Cowboy's Code (2001)
15. The Great Montana Cowboy Auction (2002)
16. The Cowboy's Christmas Miracle (2002)
17. A Cowboy's Pursuit (2002)

==== Tanner Brothers Sub-Series ====
1. Cowboys Don't Cry (1995)
2. Cowboys Don't Quit (1995)
3. Cowboys Don't Stay (1995)

=== New York! New York! Series ===
1. Finn's Twins! (1996)
2. Fletcher's Baby! (1997)
3. Gibson's Girl (1999)
4. Rhys's Redemption (2000)
5. The Inconvenient Bride (2001)
6. Nathan's Child (2003)
7. The Inconvenient Bride (2005)

==== Fletcher Bothers Sub-Series ====
1. Finn's Twins! (1996)
2. Fletcher's Baby! (1997)
3. Gibson's Girl (1999)

==== Wolfe Brothers Sub-Series ====
1. Rhys's Redemption (2000)
2. The Inconvenient Bride (2001)
3. Nathan's Child (2003)

=== Mcgillivray's of Pelican Cay Series ===
1. McGillivray's Mistress (2003)
2. In McGillivray's Bed (2004)
3. Lessons from a Latin Lover (2005)

=== This Time, Forever Series Multi-Author ===
- A Baby for Christmas (1995)

=== From Here To Paternity Series Multi-Author ===
- Finn's Twins! (1996)

=== Eligible Bachelors Series Multi-Author ===
- Cowboy on the Run (1999)
- Secret Father (2004)

=== Collections ===
- Dare to Trust / Call Up the Wind (2004)
- Cowboys Don't Cry / Cowboys Don't Quit (2004)
- Cowboys Don't Stay / Cowboy and the Kid (2005)

=== Omnibus In Collaboration ===
- My Valentine (1993) (with Judith Arnold, Anne Stuart and Linda Randall Wisdom)
- Marry Me Cowboy (1995) (with Janet Dailey, Susan Fox and Margaret Way)
- Home For Christmas (1996) (with Debbie Macomber and Shannon Waverly)
- Valentine Affairs (1999) (with Muriel Jensen, Anne Stuart and Linda Randall Wisdom)
- Wedlocked (1999) (with Day Leclaire and Margaret Way)
- Christmas Presents (1999) (with Penny Jordan and Sally Wentworth)
- Blood Brothers (2000) (with Lucy Gordon)
- Do You Take This Cowboy (2000) (with Cait London)
- Christmas Weddings (2001) (with Elizabeth Bevarly)
- Even Better Than Before (2002) (with B.J. James)
- His Majesty, MD / A Cowboy's Pursuit (2003) (with Leanne Banks)
- Greek Millionaires (2004) (with Sara Craven and Penny Jordan)
- Love in the City (2005) (with Miranda Lee and Cathy Williams)
- Way Home / Cowboy's Christmas Miracle / Because a Husband is Forever (2005) (with Marie Ferrarella and Linda Howard)
- Men Made In America Vol 5 (2007) (with Bethany Campbell, Ingrid Weaver, Peggy Webb and Annette Broadrick)
- Men Made In America Vol 10 (2007) (with Cathy Gillen Thacker, Pamela Toth, Heather Graham and Carla Cassidy)

== Awards ==
- 1997 - Romance Writers of America RITA Award, Short Contemporary Series Romance – Cowboy Pride
- 2000 - Romance Writers of America RITA Award, Short Contemporary Romance – The Stardust Cowboy
