= Lynn Kurland =

American writer

- Born: United States
- Occupation: Novelist
- Writing career
- Period: 1996–present
- Genres: Romance, Fantasy, Time travel
- Notable works: Stardust of Yesterday, To Kiss in Shadows
- Notable awards: RITA award – Best First Book and Paranormal Romance; 1997 Stardust of Yesterday; RITA award – Romance Novella; 2003 To Kiss in Shadows
- Website: www.lynnkurland.com

Lynn Kurland is an American author of historical, time travel, and fantasy romance novels. The characters in most of her books all belong to one of three extended families (MacLeod, McKinnon, de Piaget). She is a three time recipient of the Romance Writers of America RITA Award.

== Biography ==
Lynn Kurland is an only child. Her first attempts at writing came when she was five years old and living in Hawaii. Her series of short stories featured a young man who encountered all sorts of trouble. After she moved to the mainland U.S. a short time later, she put aside her interest in writing to focus on music. Kurland always loved to read, though, and in college was introduced to romance novels. She soon decided to write her own novel.

Stardust of Yesterday was published in 1996, winning two RITA awards. To date, she has published twenty-nine full-length novels with a regular schedule of a Nine Kingdoms fantasy novel every January and a time-travel/paranormal every April. She has also published eight novellas, one of which won a RITA.

Kurland's novels have appeared on The New York Times Bestseller List, USA Today Bestseller List, The New York Times Extended Bestseller List, the Amazon Top 100, and the Barnes & Noble, Waldenbooks, and B. Dalton Bestsellers lists. She has won three RITA awards and was a finalist for a fourth.

Kurland is trained as a classical musician.

== Bibliography ==
=== MacLeod, McKinnon, de Piaget Novels ===
- Stardust of Yesterday (1996) Kendrick de Piaget and Genevieve Buchanan
- A Dance Through Time (1996) James MacLeod and Elizabeth Smith
- This Is All I Ask (1997) Christopher of Blackmour and Gillian of Warewick
- The Very Thought of You (1998) Alexander Smith and Margaret of Falconberg
- Another Chance to Dream (1998) Rhys de Piaget and Gwennelyn of Segrave
- The More I See You (1999) Richard of Burwyck and Jessica Blakely
- If I Had You (2000) Robin de Piaget and Anne of Fenwyck
- My Heart Stood Still (2001) Thomas MacLeod McKinnon and Iolanthe MacLeod
- From This Moment On (2002) Colin of Berkhamshire and Alienore of Solonge
- A Garden in the Rain (2003) Patrick MacLeod and Madelyn Phillips
- Dreams of Stardust (2005) Jackson Alexander Kilchurn IV and Amanda de Piaget
- Much Ado in the Moonlight (2006) Connor MacDougal and Victoria McKinnon
- To Kiss In the Shadows (2006) (A novella originally published in TAPESTRY) Jason of Artane and Lianna of Grasleigh
- When I Fall in Love (2007) Nicholas de Piaget and Jennifer McKinnon
- With Every Breath (2008) Robert Cameron and Sunshine Phillips
- Till There Was You (2009) Zachary Smith and Mary de Piaget
- One Enchanted Evening (2010) Montgomery de Piaget and Persephone Alexander
- One Magic Moment (2011) Tess Alexander and John de Piaget
- All For You (April 24, 2012) Peaches Alexander and Stephen de Piaget
- Roses in Moonlight (April 30, 2013) Derrick Cameron and Samantha Drummond
- Dreams of Lilacs (April 29, 2014) Isabelle de Piaget and Gervase de Seger
- Stars in Your Eyes (November 24, 2015) Phillip de Piaget and Imogen Maxwell
- Ever My Love (April 4, 2017) Nathaniel MacLeod and Emmaline Baxter
- A Lovely Day Tomorrow (December 21, 2021) Jackson Alexander Kilchurn V and Olivia Drummond
- Somewhere Along The Way (September 29, 2023) Rose Kilchurn and Tristan de Thierry
- As Time Goes By (May 23, 2026) Harriet Brewster and Samuel de Piaget

=== MacLeod, McKinnon, de Piaget Short Stories ===
- "The Gift of Christmas Past" in THE CHRISTMAS CAT (1996) (with Julie Beard, Jo Beverley, Barbara Bretton) Miles de Piaget and Abigail Garrett
- "Three Wise Ghosts" in CHRISTMAS SPIRIT (1997) (with Elizabeth Bevarly, Casey Claybourne and Jenny Lykins) Gideon de Piaget and Megan MacLeod McKinnon
- "And the Groom Wore Tulle" in VEILS OF TIME (1999) (with Angie Ray, Maggie Shayne and Ingrid Weaver) Ian MacLeod and Jane Fergusson
- "The Icing on the Cake" in OPPOSITES ATTRACT (2000) (with Elizabeth Bevarly, Emily Carmichael and Elda Minger) Samuel MacLeod and Sydney Kincaid
- "The Traveller" in A KNIGHT'S VOW (2001) (with Glynnis Campbell, Patricia Potter and Deborah Simmons) Sir William de Piaget and Julianna Nelson
- "To Kiss in the Shadows" TAPESTRY (2002) (with Madeline Hunter, Sherrilyn Kenyon and Karen Marie Moning) Jason de Piaget and Lianna of Grasleigh

=== Novella Collections ===
- Love Came Just In Time: "The Gift of Christmas Past" Miles and Abigail & "Three Wise Ghosts" Gideon and Megan & "And the Groom Wore Tulle" Ian and Jane & "The Icing on the Cake" Sam and Sydney (2001)

=== Nine Kingdoms Stories ===
- "The Tale of Two Swords" in TO WEAVE A WEB OF MAGIC (2004) (with Claire Delacroix, Patricia A. McKillip and Sharon Shinn)
- "A Whisper of Spring" in THE QUEEN IN WINTER (2006) (with Claire Delacroix, Sarah Monette and Sharon Shinn)
- Star of the Morning (2006) Morgan of Melksham and Mochriadhemiach of Neroche, book 1 in their trilogy
- The Mage's Daughter (2008) Morgan of Melksham and Mochriadhemiach of Neroche, book 2 in their trilogy
- Princess of the Sword (2009) Morgan of Melksham and Mochriadhemiach of Neroche, book 3 in their trilogy
- Tapestry of Spells (2010) Sarah and Ruith, book 1 in their trilogy
- Spellweaver (2011) Sarah and Ruith, book 2 in their trilogy
- Gift of Magic (2012) Sarah and Ruith, book 3 in their trilogy
- Dreamspinner (2013) Aisling and Runach, book 1 in their trilogy
- River of Dreams (2014) Aisling and Runach, book 2 in their trilogy
- Dreamer's Daughter (2015) Aisling and Runach, book 3 in their trilogy
- "The White Spell" (2016) Acair and Léirsinn, book 1
- "The Dreamer's Song" (2017) Acair and Léirsinn, book 2
- "The Prince of Souls" (2019) Acair and Léirsinn, book 3

== Awards ==
- 1997 - Romance Writers of America RITA Award, Best First Book – Stardust of Yesterday
- 1997 - Romance Writers of America RITA Award, Paranormal Romance – Stardust of Yesterday
- 2003 - Romance Writers of America RITA Award, Romance Novella – To Kiss in Shadows (from the Tapestry anthology)
- Romance Writers of America finalist for RITA Award for Best Long Historical, Another Chance to Dream
- 1999 PEARL award for Best Time Travel, The More I See You
- Romantic Times Reviewers' Choice Award for Best Contemporary Fantasy Romance, Stardust of Yesterday
- Romantic Times Bookstores that Care award for Best Paranormal Romance, Stardust of Yesterday
- Romantic Times Reviewers' Choice Award for Best Medieval Historical Romance, Another Chance to Dream
- Romantic Times Bookstores that Care Award for Best Time Travel, The Very Thought of You
- Romantic Times 1999 Career Achievement Award for Historical Fantasy
- Romantic Times 1999 Reviewers' Choice Finalist for Best Historical Time Travel, The More I See You
- Romantic Times Bookstores that Care Finalist for Best Historical, This is All I Ask
- Romantic Times Bookstores that Care Finalist for Best Time Travel, A Dance Through Time
