= Judith Arnold =

American writer (born 1953)

Barbara Keiler
- Born: April 7, 1953 (age 73); New York City, U.S.
- Education: Smith College; Brown University (AM)
- Occupation: Novelist
- Spouse: A husband
- Children: 2
- Writing career
- Pen name: Ariel Berk; Thea Frederick; Judith Arnold
- Language: English
- Period: 1983–present
- Genre: Romance
- Website: www.juditharnold.com

Barbara Keiler (born April 7, 1953), known by her pen name Judith Arnold, is an American author of crime fiction and over eighty-five romance novels. She has been writing since 1983, and has also been published under the pen names Ariel Berk and Thea Frederick.

== Biography ==
=== Personal life ===
Keiler was born in New York City. In high school, she was published in the school's creative writing magazine and edited the school newspaper. After winning a contest in college for writing a play, Keiler decided to become a playwright. She graduated from Smith College in 1974 and earned an A.M. in creative writing from Brown University in 1976. She then spent the next ten years writing plays for production in regional theaters around the country.

Keiler married after her husband obtained his Ph.D. at Brown University. They have two sons and live in suburban Boston, Massachusetts.

=== Writing career ===
After taking a year off teaching to try to write a novel, she sold a romance novel, Silent Beginnings, to Silhouette Books, in October 1983.

Since then, Keiler has written over 100 novels. These have been published in category romance lines such as Silhouette (writing as Ariel Berk), Second Chance at Love (writing as Thea Frederick), and the Harlequin lines of Temptation, American, and Superromance, as well as single-title books published by Mira (writing as Judith Arnold), mysteries, and general fiction. She is a three-time Romantic Times award-winner and has been nominated an additional four times, including for Career Achievement. Keiler has been a finalist for the Romance Writers of America RITA Award and the Golden Medallion Award, and was nominated for the RWA's Lifetime Achievement Award. She is also a past president of Novelists, Inc.

=== Class action suit ===
In July 2012 Keiler, along with two other named plaintiffs representing approximately 1000 authors, filed a class action suit, Barbara Keiler v. Harlequin Enterprises Limited, 12cv5558, U.S. District Court, Southern District of New York (Manhattan), against HQ Enterprises, alleging improper payment of e-book royalties. The case was dismissed in April 2013 by Harold Baer Jr. but was accepted on appeal in 2014. The parties agreed to settle in March 2016 and a $4.1M settlement was approved by William H. Pauley III in July 2016.

== Bibliography ==
=== As Ariel Berk ===
==== Single novels ====
- Silent Beginnings (1983)
- Promise of Love (1984)
- Remedies of the Heart (1984)
- Hungry for Love (1985)
- Breaking the Ice (1985)
- False Impressions (1986)
- Teacher's Pet (1986)
- No Plan for Love (1986)
- Game, Set, Match (1987)
- Playing with Matches (1987)
- Together Again (1988)
- Peace of Mind (1989)
- A Package Deal (1989)

=== As Thea Frederick ===
==== Single Novel ====
- Beloved Adversary (1984)

=== As Judith Arnold ===
==== Stand alone novels ====
- Come Home to Love (1985)
- A Modern Man (1985)
- Flowing to the Sky (1985)
- Jackpot (1986)
- Special Delivery (1986)
- Man and Wife (1986)
- On Love's Trail (1986)
- Best Friends (1987)
- Comfort and Joy (1987)
- Twilight (1988)
- Going Back (1988)
- One Whiff of Scandal (1989)
- Turning Tables (1989)
- Survivors (1990)
- Lucky Penny (1990)
- Change of Life (1990)
- One Good Turn (1991)
- A Loverboy (1991)
- Raising the Stakes (1991)
- Safe Harbor (1991) aka Safe Harbour
- Trust Me (1992)
- The Woman Downstairs (1992)
- Opposing Camps (1992)
- Sweet Light (1992)
- Just Like Romeo and Juliet (1993)
- Oh, You Beautiful Doll (1993)
- Flashfire (1993)
- The Parent Plan (1994)
- Private Lies (1994)
- Romantic Reunion (1994)
- Cry Uncle (1995)
- Married to the Man (1996)
- Barefoot in the Grass (1996)
- Courting Trouble (1997)
- Her Secret Lover (1999)
- The Wrong Bride (1999)
- Looking for Laura (2001)
- Hidden Treasures (2003)
- Right Place, Wrong Time (2003)
- Heart on the Line (2003)
- The Fixer Upper (2005)
- The Marriage Bed (2007)
- Meet Me in Manhattan (2010)
- Goodbye to All That (2012)

==== Keeping the Faith Series ====
1. Promises (1987)
2. Commitments (1987)
3. Dreams (1987)

==== Yorktown Towers Series Multi-Author ====
3. Harvest the Sun (1988)

==== Class of '78 Series Multi-Author ====
1. Alessandra & the Archangel (1994)

==== STUDS Series Multi-Author ====
1. The Marrying Type (1994)

==== Bachelor Arms Series Multi-Author ====
10. The Lady in the Mirror (1995)
11. Timeless Love (1995)

==== Weddings By Dewilde Series Multi-Author ====
7. A Stranger's Baby (1996)

==== The Daddy School Series ====
1. Father Found (1997)
2. Father Christmas (1997)
3. Father of Two (1998)
4. Dr. Dad (2000)
5. 'Tis the Season (2000)
6. Hush, Little Baby (2001)
7. Daddy’s Girl (2001)
8. Somebody's Dad (2002)
9. Almost an Angel (Novella) (2013)
- Duet: Father Found / Father Christmas (2000)

==== The Magic Jukebox ====
1. Changes (2014)
2. True Colors (2014)
3. Wild Thing (2014)
4. Heat Wave (2015)
5. Moondance (2015)
6. Take the Long Way Home (2016)
7. Angel of the Morning (2016)
8. Rescue Me (2018)

==== The Lainie Lovett Mysteries ====
1. Still Kicking (2016)
2. Kickback (2016)
3. Dropkick (2016)
4. Kick the Bucket (2017)

==== Delta Justice Series Multi-Author ====
- Legacy of Secrets (1998)

==== Welcome to Riverbend Series Multi-Author ====
- Birthright (2002)

==== Bloom Family Series ====
1. Love in Bloom's (2002)
2. Blooming All Over (2004)

==== Finders, Keeper Agency Series ====
1. Found: One Wife (2002)
2. Found: One Son (2003)

==== Hotel Marchand Series Multi-Author ====
1. In the Dark (2006)

==== Collections ====
- Father Knows Best (2001)
- Hope Street + The Marriage Bed (2009)

==== Anthologies in Collaboration ====
- My Valentine 1993 (Saints Alive / Chocolate Kisses / Simple Charms / Ms. Scrooge Meets Cupid) (1993) (with Anne McAllister, Anne Stuart and Linda Randall Wisdom)
- Millennium Baby (Baby, It's Cold Outside / One-Night-Stand Baby / Baby Jane Doe) (1999) (with Bobby Hutchinson and Kristine Rolofson)
- All Summer Long (Daddy's Girl / Home, Hearth and Haley / Temperature Rising) (2001) (with Bobby Hutchinson and Muriel Jensen)
- All They Want for Christmas (Comfort and Joy / Merry Christmas, Baby) (2001) (with Pamela Browning)
- Written in the Stars (In the Stars / Shooting Stars / Star Crossed) (2001) (with Kate Hoffmann and Gina Wilkins)
- Fool for Love (Fooling Around / Nobody's Fool / Fools Rush In) (2004) (with Stephanie Bond and Vicki Lewis Thompson)
- Burning Bright (Return of the Light / Star Light, Star Bright / One for Each Night) (2004) (with Maggie Shayne and Anne Stuart)
- Baby Jane / We Saw Mummy Kissing Santa Claus / Wide Open Spaces (2004) (with Roz Denny Fox and Brenda Novak)
- How to Marry a Millionaire (Family Wealth / Rich Man, Poor Man / Once Upon a Husband) (2004) (with Suzanne Forster and Muriel Jensen)

=== Non-fiction ===
- "Women Do" essay in Dangerous Men and Adventurous Women: Romance Writers on the Appeal of the Romance (1992)
- "This I Do for Me" essay in North American Romance Writers (1999, ISBN 0810836041)

== See also ==
- List of romantic novelists
