= Cherry Adair =

South African-American writer

Cherry Wilkinson
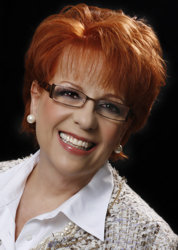
- Born: 2 April 1951 (age 75); Cape Town, South Africa
- Occupation: Novelist
- Spouse: David
- Children: 2
- Writing career
- Pen name: Cherry Adair
- Language: English
- Period: 1994–present
- Genre: Romance novel
- Website: cherryadair.com

Cherry Adair (born 2 April 1951) is a South African–American romantic fiction writer. She lives near Seattle, Washington with her husband.

== Biography ==
Born in Cape Town, South Africa, Adair moved to the United States in her early 20s and settled in San Francisco, where she opened a business as an interior designer. Adair and her husband, David, have two daughters; they keep two standard schnauzers, Max and Chase, who compete nationally in agility trials. A voracious reader, she began to have story ideas of her own and transferred her creative process from interior design to writing novels, writing seventeen full books before her first novel, The Mercenary, sold to Harlequin for their Temptation line in 1994.

In 2000, Adair published Kiss and Tell, the second of what was to become her popular T-FLAC series with Ballantine. The series involves operatives in Terrorist Force Logistical Assault Command (T-FLAC), a fictional secret counter-terrorist force. In 2007, she added a new "psi unit" to the T-FLAC series, where the T-FLAC operatives have wizard powers, taking them into the subgenre of "paranormal romance" with her award-winning Edge trilogy. The books in the continuing series are all classified in a subgenre known as "romantic suspense" and Adair has been touted as 'one of the reigning queens of romantic adventure' by Romantic Times, and is considered 'adept at orchestrating both the thriller action and the tango of desire' in her writing.

== Awards ==
Adair has received a number of awards during her career. She is a six-time finalist for the RITA Award given by Romance Writers of America, and she has been nominated for the Career Achievement Award for Romantic Suspense from Romantic Times two times. Her book Hide and Seek tied at number eight with author Nora Roberts for Romance Writers of America Top Ten Books of the Year in 2001. Her awards include the Reviewers' Choice Award for Best Romantic Suspense from Romantic Times for her novel Hot Ice in 2005 and for Best Contemporary Romance for her book Kiss and Tell in 2000. She's also won the Golden Quill for Best Mainstream Single Title for Kiss and Tell in 2000, three awards from Romance Books and Readers for Best Book, Best Surprise and Best Romantic Suspense in 2000 for Kiss and Tell, the Romance Journal Frances Award for Best Romantic Suspense for Kiss and Tell and three Venus Awards from Heart Rate Reviews for Best Romantic Suspense, Sexiest Romance and Best Newly Discovered Author for her novel Kiss and Tell. She has also won a Romance Journal Frances Award for Best Category Romance with Seducing Mr. Right 2001. Recently she took first place in Barclay Gold Contemporary category for Hot Ice in 2006 and first and second in the Barclay Gold Fantasy, Future and Paranormal category with her books Edge of Danger and Edge of Fear in 2007.

Adair's books have appeared on the bestseller lists of Publishers Weekly, USA Today and the New York Times.

== Bibliography ==
=== Stark Brothers/Lodestone/StoneFish ===
1. Ricochet, November 2013
2. Gideon
3. Hush
4. Relentless
5. After Glow

=== T-FLAC ===
1. The Mercenary, HQN, June 2008 (reprinted with 100 pages added) Harlequin Temptation # 492, May 1994

==== T-FLAC Black Rose Trilogy ====
1. Hot Ice, June 2005
2. White Heat, June 2007
3. Ice Cold, October 2012

==== T-FLAC Edge Trilogy ====
1. Edge of Danger, June 2006
2. Edge of Fear, July 2006
3. Edge of Darkness, August 2006

==== T-FLAC Wright Family ====
1. Kiss and Tell, November 2000
2. Hide and Seek, October 2001
3. In Too Deep, August 2002
4. Out of Sight, August 2003
5. On Thin Ice, August 2004

===== T-FLAC Night Trilogy =====
1. Night Fall, August 2008
2. Night Secrets, September 2008
3. Night Shadow, October 2008

===== T-FLAC Fallen Angels =====
1. Absolute Doubt 2016

=== Cutter Cay ===
1. Undertow
2. Riptide
3. Vortex
4. Stormchaser
5. Hurricane
6. Whirlpool

=== Short stories ===
- Playing for Keeps
- Ricochet
- Tropical Heat
- Chameleon
- Snowball`s Chance

=== Novels ===
- Take Me also in Slow Burn
- Seducing Mr. Right also in Slow Burn
- Blush
- Black Magic

== Book list by publisher ==
=== Pocket ===
- 2010 Black Magic (stand alone single title)
- 2011 Hush (1st of the Lodestone series)
- 2012 Afterglow (2nd of the Lodestone series)

==== St. Martin's Press ====
- 2008 Rescue Me (anthology with Cindy Gerard and Lora Leigh)
- 2010 The Bodyguard (anthology with Gena Showalter and Lorie O'Clare
- 2011 Undertow (1st of the Cutter Cay series)
- 2011 Riptide (2nd of the Cutter Cay series)
- 2012 Vortex (3rd of the Cutter Cay series)

=== Harlequin ===
- The Mercenary, Harlequin Temptation # 492, May 1994
- Seducing Mr. Right, Harlequin Temptation #833, June 2001
- Take Me, Blaze # 51, August 2002
- Date with a Devil (anthology with Anne Stuart and Muriel Jensen) January 2004
- The Mercenary, HQN, June 2008 (reprinted with 100 pages added)

==== Ballantine ====
- Kiss and Tell, November 2000
- Hide and Seek, October 2001
- In Too Deep, August 2002
- Out of Sight, August 2003
- On Thin Ice, August 2004
- Hot Ice, June 2005
- Edge of Danger, T-FLAC psi unit, June 2006
- Edge of Fear, T-FLAC psi unit, July 2006
- Edge of Darkness, T-FLAC psi unit, August 2006
- White Heat, June 2007
- Night Fall, T-FLAC psi unit, August 2008
- Night Secrets, T-FLAC psi unit, September 2008
- Night Shadows, T-FLAC psi unit, October 2008

==== Signet/NAL ====
- Dare Me, Signet Eclipse, (anthology with Jill Shalvis and Julie Leto) March 2005

==== Gallery Books ====
- Blush, April 2015

==== Adair Digital ====
- Ice Cold, (ebook) T-FLAC, October 2012
- Chameleon, (ebook), T-FLAC psi novella, September 2013 (originally published as Temptation on Ice in an anthology in 2010)
- Ricochet, (ebook), T-FLAC novella, November 2013
- Gideon, March 2015
