= Christmas Wishes =

Christmas Wishes or Christmas wishes may refer to:

- Christmas-timed greetings such as "Merry Christmas", "Happy Christmas", or "Season's Greetings"
- Christmas Wishes (Anne Murray album), a 1981 Christmas album by Canadian artist Anne Murray
- Holiday Wishes (Idina Menzel album), also titled Christmas Wishes, a 2014 Christmas album by American pop artist Idina Menzel
- Christmas Wishes, a 2006 album by Iranian-Armenian flamenco guitarist Armik
- "Christmas Wishes" (The Office), an episode of the U.S. TV series The Office

== See also ==
- Christmas Wish (disambiguation)
