= Elizabeth Bevarly =

American writer (born 1961)

- Born: 1961 (age 64–65); Louisville, Kentucky, US
- Occupation: Novelist
- Writing career
- Period: 1989–present
- Genre: Romance
- Website: www.elizabethbevarly.com

Elizabeth Bevarly (born 1961 in Louisville, Kentucky) is an American writer of over 70 romance novels since 1989. She is a New York Times bestselling author.

== Biography ==
Bevarly was born in 1961 and raised in Louisville, Kentucky. Her grandmothers were Ruth Bevarly and Hazel Robinson.

In 1983, she obtained a B.A. with honors in English from the University of Louisville. She worked many diverse jobs, including an editorial assistant for a medical journal. In 1989, she published her first novel. Now, she is a New York Times bestselling author.

She married a member of the Coast Guard who was stationed in San Juan, Puerto Rico. She has also lived in Washington D.C., Northern Virginia, and South Jersey. In 1994, they had a son, and now they, their son and their two cats reside back in her native Kentucky.

== Awards ==
- Career Achievement Award, Romantic Times, for Series Love and Laughter
- 1996, National Readers' Choice Award, for The Perfect Father

== Bibliography ==
=== Stand alone novels ===
- Destinations South (1989)
- Donovan's Chance (1990)
- Moriah's Mutiny (1991)
- An Unsuitable Man for the Job (1992)
- Jake's Christmas (1992)
- Hired Hand (1993)
- The Wedding (1993)
- Return Engagement (1993)
- The Honeymoon (1995)
- My Man Pendleton (1998)
- Her Man Friday (1999)
- How to Trap a Tycoon (2000)
- That Boss of Mine (2000)
- He Could Be the One (2001)
- Take Me I'm Yours (2002)
- The Ring on Her Finger (2003)
- The Thing about Men (2004)
- Undercover with the Mob (2004)
- Indecent Suggestion (2005)
- My Only Vice (2006)
- Married to His Business (2007)
- The House on Butterfly Way (2012)

=== Close Series ===
- Close Range (1990)
- Up Close (1992)

=== From Here To Maternity Series ===
- A Dad Like Daniel (1995)
- The Perfect Father (1995)
- Dr. Daddy (1995)
- A Doctor in Her Stocking (1999)
- Dr. Irresistible (2000)
- Dr. Mummy (2000)

=== From Here To Paternity Series ===
- Father of the Brat (1996)
- Father of the Brood (1996)
- Father on the Brink (1996)

=== McCormick Series ===
- Roxy and the Rich Man (1997)
- Lucy and the Loner (1997)
- Georgia Meets Her Groom (1997)

=== Blame It on Bob Series ===
- Beauty and the Brain (1998)
- Bride of the Bad Boy (1998)
- The Virgin and the Vagabond (1998)

=== Follow that Baby Series Multi-Author ===
- The Sheriff and the Impostor Bride (1998)

=== Fortune's Children Series Multi-Author ===
- Society Bride (1999)

=== Monahan Series ===
- First Comes Love (2000)
- Monahan's Gamble (2000)
- The Secret Life of Connor Monahan (2001)
- The Temptation of Rory Monahan (2001)

=== Amber Court Series Multi-Author ===
- When Jayne Met Erik (2001)

=== Crown and Glory Series Multi-Author ===
- Taming the Prince (2002)

=== Dynasties the Barones Series Multi-Author ===
- Taming the Beastly MD (2003)

=== Logan's Legacy Series Multi-Author ===
- The Newlyweds (2005)

=== Fortunes of Texas: Reunion Series Multi-Author ===
- The Debutante (2005)

=== The OPUS Spy Series ===
- Just Like A Man (2005)
- You've Got Male (2005)
- Express Male (2006)
- Overnight Male (2008)

=== Millionaire of the Month Series Multi-Author ===
- Married To His Business (2007)

=== Thoroughbred Legacy Series Multi-Author ===
- Flirting with Trouble (2008)

=== Kentucky Derby Series ===
- Fast & Loose (2008)
- Ready & Willing (2008)
- Neck & Neck (2009)

=== Billionaire Series ===
- The Billionaire Gets His Way (2011)
- Caught in the Billionaire's Embrace (2011)
- My Fair Billionaire (2014)

=== Collections ===
- One in a Million / Undercover with the Mob (2005)

=== Omnibus In Collaboration ===
- A Sprinkle of Fairy Dust (1996) (with Elaine Crawford, Marylyle Rogers and Maggie Shayne)
- A Family Christmas (1997) (with Joan Hohl and Marilyn Pappano)
- Love by Chocolate (1997) (with Rosanne Bittner, Muriel Jensen and Elda Minger)
- Christmas Spirits (1997) (with Casey Claybourne, Lynn Kurland and Jenny Lykins)
- A Message from Cupid (1998) (with Victoria Barrett, Margaret Brownley and Emily Carmichael)
- Do You Take This Man? (1999) (with Annette Broadrick and Diana Palmer)
- Opposites Attract (2000) (with Emily Carmichael, Lynn Kurland and Elda Minger)
- Silhouette Sensational (2000) (with Cheryl Reavis, Sharon Sala and Sandra Steffen)
- Christmas Weddings (2001) (with Anne McAllister)
- It's Raining Men! (2001) (with Barbara McCauley)
- A Mother's Day (2002) (with Marie Ferrarella and Emilie Richards)
- Under Suspicion (2002) (with Bronwyn Jameson)
- When Jayne Met Erik / Some Kind of Incredible (2002) (with Katherine Garbera)
- All I Want for Christmas (2003) (with Kathleen Creighton)
- Taming the Prince / Royally Pregnant (2003) (with Barbara McCauley)
- Mother's Love (2004) (with Marie Ferrarella and Emilie Richards)
- Sleeping with Her Rival / Taming the Beastly MD (2004) (with Sheri Whitefeather)
- Motherhood (2005) (with Candace Camp and Diana Palmer)
- Secret Heir / Newlyweds (2005) (with Gina Wilkins)
- The Newlyweds / Right By Her Side (2005) (with Christie Ridgway)
- Write It Up (2006) (with Tracy Kelleher and Mary Leo)
- In the Boss's Arms (2006) (with Susan Mallery)
- The Mills and Boon Summer Collection (2006) (with Dianne Drake and Cindi Myers)
- Double the Heat (2007) (with Lori Foster, Deirdre Martin and Christie Ridgway)
