= Katherine Stone =

American writer

Katherine Stone Chase
- Born: 1949 (age 76–77); Seattle, Washington, U.S.
- Occupation: Novelist
- Writing career
- Pen name: Katherine Stone
- Period: 1987–present
- Genre: Romance
- Website: www.katherinestone.com

Katherine Stone Chase (born 1949) is an American doctor and writer of romance novels under her maiden name Katherine Stone. She is married to fellow doctor and writer Jack Chase. She studied the English Language at Stanford University and obtained a doctorate at the University of Washington.

== Bibliography ==
=== Single novels ===
- Roommates (1 September 1987)
- The Carlton Club (October 1988)
- Twins (May 1989)
- Bel Air (1990)
- All That glitters (August 1990)
- Love Songs (March 1991)
- Rainbows (January 1992)
- Promises (also known as Promises of love) (February 1993)
- Illusions (February 1994)
- Happy Endings (August 1994)
- Pearl Moon (January 1995)
- Imagine love (April 1996)
- Bed of Roses (February 1998)
- Thief of Hearts (February 1999)
- Home at Last (June 1999)
- A Midnight Clear (December 1999)
- Island of Dreams (August 2000)
- Start Light, Star Bright (January 2002)
- The Other Twin (January 2003)
- Another Man's Son (January 2004)
- The Cinderella Hour (August 2005)
- Caroline's Journal (August 2006)

=== Omnibus ===
- Three Complete Novels: Love Songs / Bel Air / The Carlton Club (1994)
- A New Collection of Three Complete Novels: Promises / Rainbows / Twins (1995)

=== Anthologies in collaboration ===
- "Lauren" in Sisters & Secrets with Donna Julian, Jodie Larsen and Anne Stuart (February 1998)
- "The Apple Orchard" in Hearts Divided with Lois Faye Dyer and Debbie Macomber (February 2006)
