= Cindy Gerard =

American romance author

- Occupation: Novelist
- Writing career
- Genre: Romance
- Notable works: Taming The Outlaw, Take No Prisoners
- Notable awards: RITA award – Short Contemporary Romance; 2003 Taming The Outlaw; RITA award – Romantic Suspense; 2009 Take No Prisoners
- Website: www.cindygerard.com

Cindy Gerard is an American author of romantic suspense and romance novels. She is a two time RITA Award winner.

Gerard lives in Marengo, Iowa.

== Bibliography ==
=== One-Eyed Jacks Series ===
1. Killing Time, Pocket Books, 2013 (Mike Brown & Eva Salinas)
2. The Way Home, Pocket Books, 2013
3. Running Blind, Pocket Books, 2015 (Jamie Cooper & Rhonda Burns)

=== Black Ops Inc. Series ===
1. Show No Mercy, Pocket Books, 2008 ( Gabriel & Jenna )
2. Take No Prisoners, Pocket Books, 2008 ( Sam & Abbie )
3. Whisper No Lies, Pocket Books, 2008 ( Reed & Crystal )
4. Feel the Heat, Pocket Books, 2009 ( Rafael & B.J. )
5. Risk No Secrets, Pocket Books, 2010 ( Wyatt & Sophie )
6. With No Remorse, Pocket Books, 2011 ( Luke & Valentina )
7. Last Man Standing, Pocket Books, 2012 ( Joe & Stephanie )

=== Bodyguard Series ===
1. To the Edge, St. Martin’s Press, 2005 (Nolan & Jillian)
2. To the Limit, St. Martin’s Press, 2005 (Eve & Mac)
3. To the Brink, St. Martin’s Press, 2005 (Ethan & Darcy)
4. Over the Line, St. Martin’s Press, 2006 (Jase & Janey)
5. Under the Wire, St. Martin’s Press, 2006 (Manny & Lily)
6. Into the Dark, St. Martin’s Press, 2007 (Dallas & Amy)

=== Other ===
- Desert Heat, St. Martin’s Press, 2011

=== Silhouette Desire Books ===
- The Cowboy Takes a Lady, 1995
- The Bride Wore Blue, 1996
- Lucas: The Loner, 1996
- A Bride for Crimson Falls, 1997
- A Bride for Abel Greene, 1997
- Marriage, Outlaw Style, 1998
- The Outlaw’s Wife, 1998
- Lone Star Prince, 1999
- The Outlaw Jesse James, 1999
- In His Loving Arms, 2000
- The Bridal Arrangement, 2001
- Lone Star Knight, 2001
- The Secret Baby Bond, 2002
- Taming the Outlaw, 2002
- The Bluewater Affair, 2003
- The Librarian’s Passionate Knight, 2003
- Tempting the Tycoon, 2003
- Breathless for the Bachelor, 2004
- Storm of Seduction, 2004
- Between Midnight and Morning, 2005
- Black-Tie Seduction, 2005
- A Convenient Proposition, 2006

=== Bantam Loveswept Books ===
- Into the Night, 1994
- Perfect Double, 1993
- Dream Tide, 1993
- Man Around the House, 1993
- Slow Burn, 1992
- Temptation from the Past, 1991
- Maverick, 1991

=== Anthologies ===
- Rescue Me, with Cherry Adair and Lora Leigh, St. Martin’s Press, 2008
- Deadly Promises, with Sherrilyn Kenyon, Laura Griffin and Dianna Love, Pocket Books, 2010

== Awards and reception ==
- 2003 - Romance Writers of America RITA Award, Short Contemporary Romance – Taming The Outlaw
- 2009 - Romance Writers of America RITA Award, Romantic Suspense – Take No Prisoners
- 2009 - Romantic Times Reviewers' Choice Award, Romantic Intrigue – Feel the Heat
