= Linda Randall Wisdom =

American writer

Linda Wisdom
- Born: United States
- Occupation: Novelist
- Writing career
- Pen name: Also writes as Linda Randall Wisdom
- Period: 1978–present
- Genres: Romantic novel, paranormal romance
- Website: www.lindawisdom.com

Linda Randall Wisdom is an American author of contemporary romance novels.

== Biography ==
Wisdom began writing in 1978, and sold her first two novels, Dancer in the Shadows and Fourteen Karat Beauty to Silhouette Romance in 1979. After her supervisor discovered that she had written the books, he fired her from her job as the office manager for a personnel agency, and she turned to writing fiction full-time.

Wisdom has twice been nominated for a Romantic Times Reviewers' Choice Award, in 2002 for Two Little Secrets and in 2003 for Pregnancy Countdown. She has been a multi recipient of the Romantic Times Career Achievement Award.

== Works ==
=== Novels ===
- Dancer in the Shadow (1981)
- Fourteen Karat Beauty (1982)
- Bright Tomorrow (1982)
- Man with Doubts (1982)
- Dreams from the Past (1983)
- Unspoken Past (1983)
- Guardian Angel (1983)
- Snow Queen (1984)
- For Better or Worse (1984)
- Caution: Man at Work (1984)
- Love Has Many Voices (1985)
- Gentle Protector (1985)
- Birds of a Feather (1985)
- Written in the Stars (1986)
- All a Man Could Want (1986)
- Island Rogue (1986)
- A Love to Last Forever (1986)
- Murphy's Charm (1986)
- Splendor at Dawn (1986)
- A Perilous Affair (1987)
- Lady's Choice (1989)
- Appearances Are Deceiving (1989)
- Sins of the Past (1989)
- A Man for Maggie (1990)
- Free Spirits (1991)
- This Old House (1992)
- Under His Spell (1992)
- The Countess and the Cowboy (1993)
- No Room at the Inn (1993)
- O'Malley's Quest (1993)
- Double Jeopardy (1994)
- He's a Rebel (1994)
- Sometimes a Lady (1995)
- Counterfeit Husband (1995)
- Mommy Heiress (1995)
- No More Secrets (1995)
- Twist of Fate (1996)
- No More Mister Nice Guy (1996)
- Do You Take This Man... (1996)
- In Memory's Shadow (1997)
- Mr. and Mrs. and Mrs.? (1997)
- Bells, Rings, and Angels' Wings (1997)
- She's Having His Baby (1998)
- Last Two Bachelors (1999)
- My Little One (2000)
- Mirror, Mirror (2000)
- Bride of Dreams (2001)
- A Stranger Is Watching (2001)
- Small-Town Secrets (2002)
- Two Little Secrets (2002)
- Roses After Midnight (2003)
- Pregnancy Countdown (2003)
- After the Midnight Hour (2005)
- Single Kid Seeks Dad (2005)
- Memories After Midnight (2006)
- 50 Ways to Hex Your Lover (2008)
- Hex Appeal (2008)
- Wicked By Any Other Name (2009)
- Hex in High Heels (2009)
- Demons Are A Girl's Best Friend (2011)
- Undercover Demon (2012)
- Undercover Demon (2012)

=== Omnibus ===
- My Valentine (1993) (with Judith Arnold, Anne McAllister, Anne Stuart)
- A Match for Mom (1997) (with Anne Mather, Vicki Lewis Thompson)
- Rocky Mountain Men (1997) (with Debbi Bedford, Lynn Erickson)
- Valentine Affairs (1999) (with Muriel Jensen, Anne McAllister, Anne Stuart)
- Roses After Midnight / For Her Protection (2004) (with Lauren Giordano)
- After the Midnight Hour / Truth or Consequences / Bachelor at Risk (2005) (with Diana Duncan, Rebecca Winters)
- Warriors Gone Wild (2006) (with Brit Blaise, Dakota Cassidy, Tina Gerow)

== See also ==
List of romantic novelists
