= Christie Ridgway =

American romance author

Christie Ridgway is an American romance author. Ridgway has written for many publishing houses, including Silhouette and Avon.

== Biography ==
Christie Ridgway grew up in California, and began writing romance when she was eleven years old. She developed a crush on the boy on the cover of the latest Tigerbeat magazine and realized that the only way she would ever meet him was in her imagination. She wrote a series of romantic stories in which she was able to date the cute boy.

In her freshman year of college, at the annual Halloween Dance, she met her future husband. They married several years later and now have two sons.

After graduation, Ridgway spent several years working as a technical writer and a computer programmer. While her sons were young, she rediscovered the joys of reading romance novels, and decided that she wanted to write the same kind of books, ones that provided both "entertainment and emotional satisfaction."

Ridgway and her family live in California.

== Bibliography ==
=== Novels ===
- The Wedding Date (1995)
- Have Baby, Will Marry (1997)
- Follow That Groom! (1997)
- Ready, Set... Baby! (1998)
- Big Bad Dad (1998)
- The Bridesmaid's Bet (1999)
- The Millionaire and the Pregnant Pauper (1999)
- Wish You Were Here (2000)
- Beginning with Baby (2001)
- This Perfect Kiss (2001)
- From This Day Forward (2001)
- First Comes Love (2002)
- The Marriage Maker (2002)
- Mad Enough to Marry (2002)
- In Love with Her Boss (2002)
- Then Comes Marriage (2003)
- Do Not Disturb (2004)
- The Thrill of It All (2004)
- An Offer He Can't Refuse (2005)
- Right by Her Side (2005)
- The Care and Feeding of Unmarried Men (2006)
- The Reckoning (2006)
- Must Love Mistletoe (2006)
- Not Another New Year's (2007)
- His Forbidden Fiancee (2007)

=== Omnibus ===
- Mistletoe and Mayhem (2004) (with Judi McCoy, Katherine Hall Page, Joanne Pence)
- Marked for Marriage / Love with Her Boss (2004) (with Jackie Merritt)
- The Newlyweds / Right By Her Side (2005) (with Elizabeth Bevarly)

=== Novellas ===
- The Wisegirls Guide to Dating (2005)
