= Madeline Hunter =

American author of romance novels

- Born: June 8, 1952; Sharon Hill, Pennsylvania
- Died: April 15, 2025 (aged 72)
- Occupations: Professor, Novelist
- Writing career
- Period: 2000–2025
- Genres: Romance, historical
- Notable works: Stealing Heaven, Lessons of Desire
- Notable awards: RITA award – Long Historical Romance; 2003 Stealing Heaven; RITA award – Historical Romance; 2008 Lessons of Desire
- Website: madelinehunter.com

Madeline Hunter (June 8, 1952 – April 15, 2025) was the pen name of an American author of romance novels. She was a two time winner of the Romance Writers of America's prestigious RITA award.

== Biography ==
Hunter was born on June 8, 1952 in Sharon Hill, Pennsylvania. Her parents were Joseph and Anna Cirillo.

Hunter's first book By Arrangement was published in 2000 and she received the award for Waldenbooks Bestselling Debut Author that year.

Hunter spoke at writers' conferences and events on craft and industry. She had a Ph.D. in Art History and was a professor at Duquesne University. She lived in Pennsylvania.

She died of cancer on April 15, 2025.

== Bibliography ==
=== Medieval Historicals ===
- By Arrangement
- By Possession
- By Design
- The Protector
- Lord of a Thousand Nights
- Stealing Heaven

=== The Seducer Series ===
- The Seducer
- The Saint
- The Charmer
- The Sinner
- The Romantic

=== The Seducer Spin-offs ===
- Lord of Sin
- Lady of Sin

=== The Rothwell Series ===
- Rules of Seduction
- Lessons of Desire
- Secrets of Surrender
- The Sins of Lord Easterbrook

=== The Rarest Bloom Series ===
- Ravishing in Red
- Provocative in Pearls
- Sinful in Satin
- Dangerous in Diamonds

=== The Fairbourne Quartet ===
- The Surrender of Miss Fairbourne
- The Conquest of Lady Cassandra
- The Counterfeit Mistress
- The Accidental Duchess

=== The Wicked Trilogy ===
- His Wicked Reputation
- Tall, Dark, and Wicked
- The Wicked Duke

=== Other ===
- "An Interrupted Tapestry" in Tapestry (anthology with Lynn Kurland, Karen Marie Moning and Sherrilyn Kenyon)

== Awards and recognition ==
Year	Honor	Notes	Ref.
2000	Reviewers' Choice Award for Best First Historical Romance, for By Arrangement	Presented by the Romantic Times	
2003	RITA Award for Long Historical Romance, for Stealing Heaven	Presented by the Romance Writers of America	
2008	RITA Award for Historical Romance, for Lessons of Desire	Presented by the Romance Writers of America	

In 2000 Hunter received a rare starred review from Publishers Weekly for her book By Possession. This happened again in 2003 with The Charmer.

She was nominated four times and twice won the Romance Writers of America's prestigious RITA award. Fifteen of her books appeared on the USA Today bestseller list. She also appeared on the New York Times Bestseller List and the Waldenbooks Paperback Fiction Bestseller List. Romantic Times has awarded four and a half star reviews to fifteen of her books.
