= Susan Krinard =

American novelist

- Education: California College of Arts and Crafts (BFA)
- Occupation: Author
- Writing career
- Genres: Paranormal romance; science fiction; fantasy
- Website: susankrinard.com

Susan Krinard is an American author of paranormal romance, science fiction, and fantasy.

Krinard received a BFA in Illustration from the California College of Arts and Crafts. She became inspired to become an author when a close friend of hers read a romantic "Beauty and the Beast"-like excerpt she'd written and suggested she try her hand at romance novels. Prince of Wolves, her first romance novel, sold within a year as part of a three-book contract. Since then she has been published by HQN, Luna Books, Bantam Books, and Berkley Books.

Krinard's works often build upon one another. For example, the sister of the male protagonist in her werewolf romance, "Touch Of A Wolf" is the central character in a later novel, "Once A Wolf". Her stories portray paranormal beings, including vampires, werewolves, and extraterrestrials, interacting with and becoming the love interest of human characters.

Her urban fantasy series Midgard, beginning with the first novel Mist was released in July 2013 and the follow-up, Black Ice, was published in August 2014. Battlestorm, the third volume, was released in spring 2016.

Krinard is originally from the Bay area, lived in Toronto in the 1980s, and now lives in New Mexico with her husband.

== Bibliography ==
=== Fane series ===
1. The Forest Lord, Nov 2002 ISBN 9780425186862
2. Lord of the Beasts, Oct 2006 ISBN 9780373771394
3. Lord of Legends, Apr 2009 ISBN 9780373773657
4. Lord of Sin, Sep 2009 ISBN 9780373773985

=== Kinsman ===
1. Kinsman, Aug 2001 in Out of This World (connected)
2. Kinsman's Oath, May 2004 ISBN 9780425196557

=== Midgard ===
1. Freeze Warning, Oct 2013 (prequel)
2. Mist, July 2013 also in Chicks Kick Butt ISBN 9780765332080 ISBN 9780765368768
3. Black Ice, Aug 2014 ISBN 9780765332097
4. Battlestorm, Mar 2016 ISBN 9780765332103

=== Nightsiders ===
1. Halfway to Dawn, Nov 2012 in Holiday With a Vampire 4
2. Daysider, Aug 2013 ISBN 9780373885756
3. Nightmaster, Dec 2013 ISBN 9780373885848
4. Night Quest, Feb 2016 ISBN 9780373009626
5. Dark Journey, May 2016 ISBN 9780373009688

=== Twenties Werewolf, Vampire Series ===
1. Chasing Midnight, Oct 2007 ISBN 9780373772186
2. Dark of the Moon, Mar 2008 ISBN 9780373772582
3. Come the Night, Oct 2008 ISBN 9780373773152

=== Val Cache Series ===
1. Prince of Wolves, Sep 1999 ISBN 9780553567755
2. Prince of Dreams, Feb 1995 ISBN 9780553567762
3. Prince of Shadows, Aug 1996 ISBN 9780553567779

=== Western/Victorian Werewolf Series ===
1. Touch of the Wolf, Oct 1999 ISBN 9780553580181
2. Once a Wolf, July 2000 ISBN 9780553580211
3. Secret of the Wolf, Oct 2001 ISBN 9780425181997
4. To Catch a Wolf, Sep 2003 also in Call of the Wolf ISBN 9780425192085
5. To Tame a Wolf, May 2005 also in Call of the Wolf ISBN 9780373770472
6. Bride of the Wolf, Mar 2010 ISBN 9780373774777
7. Luck of the Wolf, Nov 2010 ISBN 9780373774692
8. Code of the Wolf, Aug 2011 ISBN 9780373775521

=== Stand Alone Novels ===
- Star Crossed, Aug 1995 ISBN 9780553569179
- Twice a Hero, June 1997 ISBN 9780553569186
- Body & Soul, Aug 1998 ISBN 9780553569193

=== Anthologies and collections ===
Anthology or Collection	Contents	Publication Date	ISBN	Comments
My Guardian Angel	Angel On My Shoulder	Mar 1995	ISBN 9780553569162	
Bewitched	Saving Sirena	Oct 1997	ISBN 9780515121575	
Out of This World	Kinsman	Aug 2001	ISBN 9780515131093	
When Darkness Falls	Kiss of the Wolf	Oct 2003	ISBN 9780373218226	
Murder by Magic	Murder Entailed	Oct 2004	ISBN 9780446679626	Kit & Olivia
Call of the Wolf	To Catch a Wolf To Tame a Wolf	May 2006	ISBN 9780425209875	
My Big Fat Supernatural Wedding		Oct 2006	ISBN 9780312343606	second Kit & Olivia adventure
Hotter Than Hell		Jun 2008	ISBN 9780061161292	
Heart of Darkness	Lady of the Nile	Jan 2010	ISBN 9780373774319	
The Mammoth Book of Irish Romance	The Morrigan's Daughter	Jan 2010	ISBN 9780762438310	
Bespelling Jane Austen	Blood and Prejudice	Sep 2010	ISBN 9780373775019	
Chicks Kick Back	Mist	Jun 2011	ISBN 9780765364760	
Holiday With a Vampire 4	Halfway to Dawn	Nov 2012	ISBN 9780373885596	

=== Non-fiction ===
- "Pushing the Boundaries: The Challenge of Futuristic, Fantasy, and Paranormal Romance" essay in North American Romance Writers (1999, ISBN 0810836041)
