= Gone to the Dogs (Carmichael novel) =

2003 novel by Emily Carmichael

- Author: Emily Carmichael
- Language: English
- Genre: Young adult novel
- Publisher: Bantam
- Publication date: December 23, 2003
- Publication place: United States
- Media type: Print (Paperback)
- Pages: 400 pp
- ISBN: 978-0-553-58633-6
- OCLC: 53979327
- LC Class: CPB Box no. 2155 vol. 8

Gone to the Dogs is a 2003 novel by Emily Carmichael. It is the third is a series about a self-centered young woman who dies and is reincarnated as a Welsh Corgi so she can make amends for her conduct in life. The novel was generally reviewed well in critical reception.

== Plot introduction ==
Piggy is the reincarnation of a blonde girl named Lydia Keane. She suffers from a diet started by her new owner, Nell Jordan. Piggy searches for morsels of food to eat. When Piggy inherits a fortune from an old man, that she visited as a therapy dog, she must protect her owner from P.I. Dan Travis, the grandson of Piggy's benefactor. At a request from his mother, he investigates Piggy and her owner, with whom he falls in love.

== Reception ==
Generally the reception of the novel highlights the humor and enjoyability of the plot. Brianna Yamashita, of Publishers Weekly, reviewed the book saying, "A villain intent on kidnapping Piggy adds some suspense, but it is Carmichael's scenic descriptions of the northern Arizona setting, insider's peek into the world of therapy pets and loveable characters, both human and otherwise, that make this lighthearted romp worth savoring."

Kristin Ramsdell, of Library Journal, reviewed the book saying, "Lively pacing, zingy dialog, and Piggy's hilarious internal monologs are just the things to lighten the winter blues for readers who like their contemporaries on the sassy, slightly paranormal side. Carmichael has written numerous historical and contemporary romances and lives in Arizona." Maria Hatton, of Booklist, reviewed the book saying, "Carmichael's spunky canine hero will win even more admirers in this terrifically funny and captivating installment in her ongoing adventures.
