= Day Leclaire =

American novelist

- Born: August 25, ?
- Education: University of California, Berkeley
- Occupation: Novelist
- Writing career
- Pen name: Day Leclaire
- Period: 1990–present
- Genre: Romance
- Website: www.dayleclaire.com

Day Leclaire is an American author of more than forty romance novels.

== Biography ==
=== Early years ===
Day Leclaire started writing when she was just a child. After a long day of trying to keep occupied in the midst of a snowstorm, Leclaire and her three siblings ran out of things to do. In an effort to keep her own patience, Leclaire's mother challenged her to write her own story. That historical epic, based on Cinderella and set in the Wild West, was the beginning of her love of writing.

Leclaire attended the University of California, Berkeley with the intent to major in anthropology.

Shortly thereafter, Leclaire met her husband, Frank, and the two married. They became entrepreneurs, running a film library in Berkeley, remodeling houses in Seattle, Washington, and then opening a produce market. When Leclaire became pregnant with their son Matt, she decided that she really wanted to be a writer.

=== Writing career ===
Although Harlequin gave her encouraging feedback, Leclaire was not able to sell a book in the beginning. Her career seemed briefly stalled when her younger sister, Nancy, died of a brain tumor and Leclaire, alone in a new city, dealt with her grief. Her husband challenged her to do something to occupy herself, and Leclaire once again turned to writing.

Leclaire has since been nominated ten times for the Romance Writers of America RITA Award, the romance novelist's equivalent of an Oscar.

=== Family ===
Leclaire was diagnosed with breast cancer in November 2000, and endured chemotherapy and radiation treatment as a result. Leclaire took a break from writing from 2004 to 2005 in an attempt to recover her creativity, but is finally back in her groove. In 2006 she began writing again, this time for Silhouette Desire, and had five books released in 2007.

She and her husband live on Hatteras Island in North Carolina. Leclaire's only son has recently graduated from the University of North Carolina, Chapel Hill, and plans to attend Virginia Tech for graduate studies.

== Bibliography ==
=== Single novels ===
- Jinxed (1990)
- Where There's a Will (1991)
- To Catch a Ghost (1993)
- Once a Cowboy (1994)
- Her Secret Santa (1997)
- Mail-order Bridegroom (1995)
- One Night Wife (1995)
- Make Believe Engagement (1996)
- The Secret Baby (1997)
- Her Secret Bodyguard (2000)
- To Marry a Sheikh (2000)
- The Marriage Project (2001)
- The Bride Price (2001)

=== Thorsen Brothers Series ===
1. In the Market (1992)
2. A Wholesale Arrangement (1992)

=== Salvatore Brothers Series ===
1. Who's Holding the Baby? (1994)
2. Bridegroom on Approval (1999)
3. The Brides Proposition (2000)
4. The Baby Gift (2000)

=== Fairytale Weddings Series ===
1. Temporary Husband (1996)
2. Accidental Wife (1996)
3. Shotgun Marriage (1997)
4. Bridegroom on Approval (1999)
5. Long-lost Bride (1999)

=== Guardian Angels Series ===
- The Boss, the Baby and the Bride (1998)

=== The Gem Computer Series ===
1. The Twenty-Four Hour Bride (1998)
2. The Miracle Wife (1998)

=== Whirlwind Weddings Series Multi-Author ===
- The Twenty-Four Hour Bride (1998)

=== Texas Grooms Wanted! Series ===
- The Nine Dollar Daddy (1999)

=== White Weddings Series ===
- Shotgun Bridegroom (1999)

=== Bachelor Auction Series Multi-Author ===
- The Perfect Solution (2000)

=== The Wedding Blitz Series ===
1. The Provocative Proposal (2001)
2. The Whirlwind Wedding (2002)
3. The Baby Bombshell (2002)

=== Forrester Square Series Multi-Author ===
- Keeping Faith (2003)

=== Nascar Series Multi-Author ===
- Old Flame, New Sparks (2007)

=== The Royals Series ===
1. The Royal Affair (2007)
2. The Forbidden Princess (2007)
3. The Prince's Mistress (2007)
4. The Royal Wedding Night (2007)
5. The Billionaire's Baby Negotiation (2007)

=== Dante's Legacy Series ===
1. Dante's Blackmailed Bride (2008)
2. Dante's Stolen Bride (2008)
3. Dante's Wedding Deception (2008)
4. Dante's Contract Marriage (2008)
5. Dante's Ultimate Gamble (2010)
6. Dante's Temporary Fiancee (2010)

=== Omnibus In Collaboration ===
- Christmas Treats (1998) (with Lindsay Armstrong and Penny Jordan)
- Her Baby Secret (1999) (with Jacqueline Baird, Lynne Graham)
- Wedlocked (1999) (with Anne McAllister and Margaret Way)
- Mail-Order Grooms (2000) (with Vicki Lewis Thompson)
- Rainy Day Kisses / The Bride Price (2001) (with Debbie Macomber)
- Christmas Wishes, Christmas Gifts: The Heart of Christmas / Her Secret Santa (2002) (with Tara Taylor Quinn)
- Marriage Mergers (2002) (with Susan Napier and Michelle Reid)
- Tender Love Stories: Compliments of the Groom / Who's Holding the Baby?/ One-night Wife / A Secret Valentine/ East of Today (2002) (with Dixie Browning and Kasey Michaels)
- Western Weddings (2002) (with Susan Fox)
- Kissing Frosty / The Boss, the Baby and the Bride (2002) (with Anne Stuart)
- In Name Only (2003) (with Jill Shalvis)

=== Graphic novels ===
- Jinxed (2006) art by Akemi Maki
