= Cathy Gillen Thacker =

American novelist

- Occupation: Novelist
- Writing career
- Genre: Romance

Cathy Gillen Thacker is an American author of over 147 romance novels.

== Biography ==
Cathy Gillen Thacker is married and a mother of three. She and her husband spent eighteen years in Texas and now reside in North Carolina.

She has published 147 books under the Harlequin brand, which have sold over 13.5 million books, in 17 languages and over 35 countries.

== Bibliography ==
=== Too Many Dads ===
1. Baby on the Doorstep (1994)
2. Daddy to the Rescue (1994)
3. Too Many Moms (1994)

=== Wild West Weddings ===
1. The Cowboy's Bride (1996)
2. The Ranch Stud (1996)
3. The Maverick Marriage (1996)
4. One Hot Cowboy (1997)
5. Spur-Of-The-Moment Marriage (1997)

=== McCabe Family ===
1. Dr. Cowboy (1999)
2. Wildcat Cowboy (1999)
3. A Cowboy's Woman (1999)
4. A Cowboy Kind of Daddy (1999)
5. Texas Vows (2001)
6. The Ultimate Texas Bachelor (2005)
7. Santa's Texas Lullaby (2005)
8. A Texas Wedding Vow (2006)
9. Blame It On Texas (2006)
10. A Laramie, Texas Christmas (2006)
11. From Texas, With Love (2007)

=== Brides of Holly Springs ===
1. The Virgin's Secret Marriage (2003)
2. The Secret Wedding Wish (2004)
3. The Secret Seduction (2004)
4. Plain Jane's Secret Life (2004)
5. Her Secret Valentine (2005)

=== Deveraux Legacy ===
1. Her Bachelor Challenge (2002)
2. His Marriage Bonus (2002)
3. My Secret Wife (2002)
4. Their Instant Baby (2002)
5. The Heiress (2003)
6. Taking Over the Tycoon (2003)

=== Lockhart Women Series ===
1. The Bride Said, I Did? (2000)
2. The Bride Said, Finally! (2000)
3. The Bride Said, Surprise! (2001)
4. The Virgin Bride Said, Wow! (2001)

=== Texas Legacies: Carrigans ===
1. The Rancher Next Door (2007)
2. The Rancher's Family Thanksgiving (2007)
3. The Rancher's Christmas Baby (2007)
4. The Gentleman Rancher (2008)

=== Made in Texas ===
1. Hannah's Baby (2008)
2. The Inherited Twins (2008)
3. A Baby In The Bunkhouse (2008)
4. Found: One Baby (2009)

=== The Lonestar Dad's Club ===
1. A Baby for Mommy (2009)
2. A Mommy for Christmas (2009)
3. Wanted: One Mommy (2010)
4. The Mommy Proposal (2010)

=== Texas Legacies: The McCabes ===
1. A Cowboy Under the Mistletoe (2010)
2. One Wild Cowboy (2011)
3. A Cowboy to Marry (2011)
4. The Triplet's First Thanksgiving
5. Her Cowboy Daddy

=== The Legends of Laramie County ===
1. The Reluctant Texas Rancher (2012)
2. The Texas Rancher's Vow
3. The Texas Rancher's Marriage
4. The Texas Rancher's Family (2013)

=== McCabe Homecoming ===
1. The Texas Lawman's Woman (2013)
2. The Long Hot Texas Summer
3. The Texas Christmas Gift
4. The Texas Wildcatter's Baby (2014)

=== McCabe Multiples ===
1. Runaway Lone Star Bride (2014)
2. Lone Star Christmas
3. Lone Star Valentine
4. Lone Star Daddy
5. Lone Star Baby
6. Lone Star Twins (2015)

=== Texas Legacies: The Lockharts ===
1. A Texas Soldier's Family (2016)
2. A Texas Cowboy's Christmas
3. The Texas Valentine Twins
4. Wanted: Texas Daddy
5. A Texas Soldier's Christmas (2017)

=== Texas Legends: The McCabes ===
1. The Texas Cowboy's Baby Rescue (2018)
2. The Texas Cowboy's Triplets
3. The Texas Cowboy's Quadruplets
4. His Baby Bargain
5. Their Inherited Triplets
6. A Tale Of Two Christmas Letters (2019)

=== Lockharts Lost & Found ===
1. His Plan For The Quintuplets (2020)
2. Four Christmas Matchmakers
3. The Twin Proposal
4. Their Texas Triplets
5. Their Texas Christmas Gift
6. The Triplets' Secret Wish
7. Their Texas Christmas Match
8. A Temporary Texas Arrangement (2023)

=== Marrying a McCabe ===
1. A Double Christmas Surprise (2024)
2. Stand-In Texas Dad (2025)
3. A Cowboy's Christmas Gift (2025)

=== Stand-alone novels ===
- Touch of Fire (1983)
- Intimate Scoundrels (1983)
- Wildfire Trace (1984)
- Heart's Journey (1985)
- Embrace Me Love (1985)
- Promise Me Today (1985)
- A Private Passion (1985)
- Reach for the Stars (1985)
- A Family to Cherish (1986)
- Heaven Shared (1986)
- The Devlin Dare (1986)
- Family to Treasure (1987)
- Rogue's Bargain (1987)
- Family Affair (1988)
- Guardian Angel (1988)
- Fatal Amusement (1988)
- Natural Touch (1988)
- Dream Spinners (1988)
- Perfect Match (1988)
- One Man's Folly (1989)
- Lifetime Guarantee (1989)
- Meant to Be (1990)
- Slalom to Terror (1990)
- It's Only Temporary (1990)
- Father of the Bride (1991)
- An Unexpected Family (1991)
- Tangled Web (1992)
- Home Free (1992)
- Anything's Possible (1992)
- Honeymoon for Hire (1993)
- Beguiled Again (1993)
- Fiance for Sale (1993)
- Kidnapping Nick (1993)
- Guilty as Sin (1994)
- Baby on the Doorstep (1994)
- Daddy to the Rescue (1994)
- Jenny and the Fortune Hunter (1994)
- Too Many Mums (1994)
- Love Potion 5 (1994)
- A Shotgun Wedding (1995)
- Miss Charlotte Surrenders (1995)
- Matchmaking Baby (1995)
- Daddy Christmas (1995)
- Mathmaking Baby (1996)
- The Cowboy's Bride (1996)
- The Ranch Stud (1996)
- The Maverick Marriage (1996)
- How to Marry...One Hot Cowboy (1997)
- Spur-of-the-moment Marriage (1997)
- Snowbound Bride (1998)
- Hot Chocolate Honeymoon (1998)
- Snow Baby (1998)
- The Cowboy's Mistress (1998)
- Make Room for Baby (1998)
- Baby's First Christmas (1998)
- His Cinderella (1999)
- A Baby by Chance (2000)
- Texas Vows (2001)
- Return to Crystal Creek (2002) (with Bethany Campbell and Vicki Lewis Thompson)
- Lost and Found (2003)
- Twice and for Always (2003)
- The Heiress (2003)
- Blame It on Texas (2006)
- Christmas Lullaby (2006)
- A Laramie, Texas Christmas (2006)
- From Texas, With Love (2007)

=== Omnibus ===
- Marriage by Design (1994)
- Yours, Mine And Ours (1997) (with Marisa Carroll, Penny Jordan)
- The Cupid Connection (1998) (with Anne Stuart and Vicki Lewis Thompson)
- In Defense of Love / Her Special Angel / Daddy Christmas / Home for Christmas (1999) (with Kathleen Creighton, Marie Ferrarella)
- The Baby Game (2000) (with Judy Christenberry)
- Western Rogues (2002) (with Annette Broadrick)
- Temporary Santa (2003) (with Leigh Michaels)
- Her Surprise Baby (2004) (with Paula Detmer Riggs)
- Special Delivery (2004) (with Maggie Shayne)
- Her Bachelor Challenge / His Marriage Bonus (2004)
- My Secret Wife / Their Instant Baby (2004)
- Be My Baby (2005) (with Adrianne Lee)
- Married in White (2005) (with Linda O. Johnston)
- Bride Said, Surprise! / Bride Said, Wow! (2005)
- Secret Wedding Wish / the Sugar House (2005) (with Christine Flynn)
- Secret Seduction / Which Child is Mine? (2005) (with Karen Rose Smith)
- Plain Jane's Secret Life / Beauty and the Black Sheep (2005) (with Jessica Bird)
