= Lynn Erickson =

American novelist

Molly Swanton & Carla Peltonen
- Occupation: Novelist
- Writing career
- Pen name: Lynn Erickson
- Period: 1980–present
- Genre: Romance

Lynn Erickson is the American joint pseudonym used by the writing team formed by Molly Swanton and Carla Peltonen. Since 1980, they have written over 50 historical/romantic suspense novels. The pseudonym Lynn Erickson is a combination of their husbands' names.

== Personal background ==
=== Molly Swanton ===
Molly Swanton (née Butler) was born on September 12, 1946, in Pennsylvania. During her youth, she attended the all-girls, college preparatory school Agnes Irwin School, which is located in Rosemont, Pennsylvania. She has been a literary judge for the Hammett Prize. As of 2012, Swanton resides in Carbondale, Colorado, where she has lived with her husband, Terry Lynn Swanton, since 1966.

=== Carla Peltonen ===
Carla Peltonen (née Friedenberg) was born in Buffalo, New York. She is the daughter of Jerome and Leona (née Shenker) Friedenberg. She is a 1964 graduate of the University of Rochester in New York. As of 2012, Peltonen resides in Aspen, where she has lived with her husband, Erik Peltonen, since 1969.

== Published works ==
=== Single novels ===
- Sweet Nemesis (1980)
- The Silver Kiss (1981)
- A Woman of San Francisco (1982)
- High Country Pride (1982)
- Dawnfire (1984)
- Snowbird (1984)
- A Chance Worth Taking (1985)
- Faces of Dawn (1985)
- Lilacs (1985)
- Some Distant Shore (1985)
- Arena of Fear (1986)
- Stormswept (1986)
- A Dangerous Sentiment (1986)
- A Perfect Gem (1987)
- Tangled Dreams (1987)
- Fool's Gold (1988)
- Firecloud (1988)
- Shadow on the Sun (1989)
- In from the Cold (1989)
- West of the Sun (1990)
- Silver Lady (1991)
- The Northern Light (1991)
- A Wing and a Prayer (1992)
- Paradox (1993)
- Wildfire (1993)
- Dancing in the Dark (1994)
- Laurel and the Lawman (1994)
- Out of the Darkness (1994)
- Aspen (1995)
- Apache Springs (1995)
- Night whispers (1996)
- Upon a Midnight Clear (1997)
- The Eleventh Hour (1998)
- Ripple Effect (1999)
- Searching for Sarah (1999)
- The Ranger and the Widow (2000)
- On Thin Ice (2000)
- Fugitive Mom (2001)
- The Agent (2002)
- On the Edge (2002)
- In the Cold (2003)
- Without a Trace (2003)
- Husband and Lover (2004)
- After Hours (2004)

=== Timetwist series (multi-author) ===
- The Last Buccaneer (1994)

=== Nine Months Later series (multi-author) ===
- The Baby Contract (1996)

=== Count on a Cop series (multi-author) ===
- Child of Mine (1998)

=== Heart of the West series (multi-author) ===
- Courting Callie (1999)

=== Collections ===
- Clouds of Suspicion (2000)

=== Omnibus In Collaboration ===
- Rocky Mountain Men (1997) (with Debbi Bedford and Linda Randall Wisdom)
- Something to Hide (1999) (with Tess Gerritsen)
