= Ingrid Weaver =

Canadian novelist

- Born: Peterborough, Ontario, Canada
- Occupation: Novelist
- Writing career
- Genre: romance
- Website: www.ingridweaver.com

Ingrid Weaver is a Canadian author of contemporary romance novels.

== Biography ==
Weaver was born and raised in Peterborough, Ontario, Canada. She has a degree in English literature. After her youngest child entered school in 1989 she began writing in the hopes that she could build a career that would allow her to work from home. None of her first eight manuscripts sold, but in July 1993 her ninth, True Blue, was purchased by Silhouette Books.

Generally Weaver writes two to three novels per year, taking up to five months to finish each work. The novels are most often classified as romantic suspense, and the protagonists are put into life-or-death situations in order more clearly reveal their true characters and feelings. In many of her novels, the hero is either connected to law enforcement or the military. Weaver also enjoys including animals in her stories "because they're usually excellent judges of character."

Weaver was awarded a Romance Writers of America RITA Award in 1998 for Best Romantic Suspense for her novel On the Way to a Wedding. She is also a recipient of the Romantic Times Career Achievement Award.

== Books ==
=== Novels ===
- The Wolf and the Woman's Touch (1996)
- A Wish and a Dream (1998)
- Engaging Sam (1999)
- Big-City Bachelor (2000)
- True Lies (2000)
- What the Baby Knew (2000)
- True Blue (2000)
- On the Way to a Wedding.... (2000)
- Fugitive Hearts (2001)
- Under the King's Command (2002)
- Aim for the Heart (2003)
- Seven Days to Forever (2003)
- Eye of the Beholder (2003)
- The Insider (2004)
- In Destiny's Shadow: Family Secrets: The Next Generation (2004)
- Romancing The Renegade (2005)
- The Angel and the Outlaw (2005)
- Loving the Lone Wolf (2005)
- Cinderella's Secret Agent (2006)
- Unmasked: Hotel Marchand (2007)
- From Russia, With Love (2007)

=== Omnibus ===
- Veils of Time (1999) (with Lynn Kurland, Angie Ray, Maggie Shayne)
- Question of Intent / Aim for the Heart (2004) (with Merline Lovelace)
- Insider / Check Mate (2004) (with Beverly Barton)
- Loving the Lone Wolf / Deadly Reunion (2005) (with Lauren Nichols)
- Cornered: Fooling Around / The Man in the Shadows / A Midsummer Night's Murder (2005) (with Julie Miller, Linda Turner)
- In Broad Daylight / Romancing the Renegade (2005) (with Marie Ferrarella)
- A Baby for Him? (2006) (with Ginna Gray)
