= Emily Carmichael (novelist) =

American writer, also known as Emily Bradshaw

- Born: United States
- Occupation: Writer, novelist
- Language: English
- Genre: Romance

Emily Carmichael (also known as Emily Bradshaw) is an American novelist, writing romances with both historical and contemporary settings. She lives in Arizona.

== Selected bibliography ==
=== Hearts of Gold series ===
- Finding Mr. Right (1999)
- Diamond in the Ruff (2001)
- Gone to the Dogs (2003)
- The Cat's Meow (2004)
- A New Leash on Life (2005)

=== Other titles ===
- The Good, the Bad, and the Sexy (2002)
- Becoming Georgia (2003)
