= Dakota X =

American painter

- Born: June 9, 1961 (age 64); Boston, Massachusetts
- Education: The Museum School; Tufts University
- Known for: Contemporary Painting
- Awards: Orlowsky Freed Foundation Grant, Finalist in the shortlist for the 2018 BP Portrait Award, National Portrait Gallery, London
- Website: https://dakota-x.org/

Dakota X (formerly Deborah Martin; born June 9, 1961) is a contemporary American painter. X's artistic work examines the complexities of individual experience particularly in its relation to home, gender identity, isolation and memory. Much of the artist's practice emerges in collaborative conversation with writers and poets, taking form through exhibitions and publications. X's stark landscape paintings often convey the essence inherent within marginalized communities that exist on the fringes of American society. In 2016, X focused on portraiture developing a long term project "Portraits of Autism" exploring the relationship and impact autistic children have within their immediate family and community on a continuum.

== Work ==
In a continued exploration of American landscapes, X has focused his attention on two landmark "saline" sites in the United States known for their distinctive inhabitants, nontraditional social ecology, and unique architecture: the Salton Sea and the Outer Cape area of Cape Cod. "Home on the Strange: In Search of the Salton Sea" is based on Polaroids taken over a period of several years, depicting various aspects of the reality of life on the Salton Sea. In this series, X examines the eerie atmosphere centered on the Salton Sea, a bizarre body of water accidentally created by an engineering fiasco in the early twentieth century when the Colorado River was diverted spilling the river's water over a lowland directly on the site of the San Andreas Fault.

The "Narrow Lands" is a transdisciplinary project documenting the architectural geography of history and time along the Outer Cape. X's paintings that feature structures on the Outer Cape have justly warranted comparisons to Edward Hopper’s. Like Hopper’s paintings, his interpretations provide neither a critical nor celebratory stance. Unlike Hopper, however, X's application of paint is undetectable.

X's series "Back of Beyond" features scenes of the unincorporated town of Wonder Valley, located in Southern California’s Mojave Desert. The imprint of America is more than apparent in this group of landscapes that feature large, gas guzzling vehicles from the 1970s and '80s. Bleached bare from years of unprotected exposure underneath the sun’s aggressive blaze, X's vintage sedans, vans, and convertibles don’t only evoke an air of abandonment, but they chronicle that which has been forgotten in exchange for what our commercially driven society considers worthy. X's series, The Slabs: The Last Free Place in America, gives voice to the nomadic cultures that drift in and out of Slab City. While the inhabitants of Slab City are noticeably absent from X's work, the paintings radiate with an underling pulse emblematic of the community’s soul. Such is achieved through the artist’s ongoing investigation of contrasting themes that touch upon isolation as well as community.

== Portraits of Autism ==
In this series Dakota X turns to ethereal abstraction to express the emotional experience of autistic children and the people closest to them. The intent of this body of work is to create a platform for social awareness while exploring the process a family goes through as their autistic child becomes an adult. The project focuses in part on relationship, connection and methods of communication while opening up a discussion about available support systems and funding for both children and adults diagnosed on the autism spectrum. Portraits of Autism provides multiple opportunities for a better understanding of autism as it presents each subject with not only a highly skilled technical ability, but a compassionate viewpoint to show each child as a complete person not only defined by their disability.

== Education ==
1992 BFA, School of the Museum of Fine Arts Boston, MA
1992 BS Master of Arts in Teaching, Art Education Tufts University

== Grants ==
Orlowsky Freed Foundation Grant Sponsored in part by the Lilian Orlowsky and William Freed Foundation Grant and the Provincetown Art Association and Museum.

== Collections ==
Provincetown Art Association and Museum
