= Linda Lael Miller =

American author

- Born: Linda Lael; 1949 (age 76–77); Washington, United States
- Occupation: Novelist
- Writing career
- Pen name: Lael St. James
- Period: 1983–present
- Genre: Romance
- Website: www.lindalaelmiller.com

Linda Lael Miller (born 1949 as Linda Lael), is an American author of more than 100 contemporary and historical romance novels. She has also written under the pen name Lael St. James.

== Personal life ==
Linda Lael was born in 1949 in Washington. Her father was a town marshal, although he, along with her uncle Jake "Jiggs" Lael also competed on the rodeo circuit. A voracious reader, Linda began writing her own stories when she was 10. As a child, Linda often visited with an elderly neighbor and listened to stories of her neighbor's experiences meeting outlaw Jesse James and witnessing a gunfight involving the Dalton Brothers. Lael graduated from high school in Northport, WA but did not attend college. After her marriage, Miller spent 10 years living in Spokane before moving away. She has lived in Italy and in London. After five years living in Arizona, Miller moved back to Washington in 2006.

Miller has established a foundation, the Linda Lael Miller Scholarships for Women. These scholarships are intended to allow women who are struggling to further their education, either through a trade school or a traditional college or university. The scholarships are funded by the fees Miller commands at speaking engagements, and winners are allowed to spend the proceeds on any expense (including childcare and transportation) that will allow her to attend school.

== Works ==
Her first manuscripts were rejected, but publishers finally purchased Fletcher's Woman, a historical romance. Since then, she has published over 77 novels, in a variety of romance novel subgenres, including contemporary, suspense, time-travel, and paranormal. The historical romances have been set in a range of time frames, from the Medieval period to the American West.

Miller is best known for her romances set in the Western United States. One of these, McKettrick's Choice, reached number 15 on the New York Times Bestseller List. In an interview, Miller stated that: "I love westerns best of all. To me, the cowboy is the great North American myth, the ideal of honor, courage and persistence we need to live up to." She has also described her western settings as "naturally romantic, from the big sky to the lonely prairie, and it's the perfect backdrop for adventure, danger, grand passion, joy, and sorrow—the whole gamut of human emotions".

The heroines of Miller's novels are known for being strong, independent women. Miller has stated that she wants her heroines to be good examples, proving that they can take care of themselves.

She has been nominated six times for the Romance Writers of America RITA Award, the highest honor given to a romance author. She has won the Silver Pen Award as well as the Romantic Times award for Most Sensual Historical Romance.

== Bibliography ==
=== Springwater series ===
- Springwater (Pocket, 1998) ISBN 0-671-02751-4
- Rachel (Pocket, 1999) ISBN 0-671-02684-4
- Savannah (Pocket, 1999) ISBN 0-671-02685-2
- Miranda (Pocket, 1999) ISBN 0-671-02686-0
- Jessica (Pocket, 1999) ISBN 0-671-02687-9
- A Springwater Christmas (Pocket, 1999) ISBN 0-671-02752-2
- Springwater Wedding (Pocket, 2002) ISBN 0-671-04249-1

=== Primrose series ===
- Bridget (Pocket, 2000) ISBN 0-671-04244-0
- Christy (Pocket, 2000) ISBN 0-671-04245-9
- Skye (Pocket, 2000) ISBN 0-671-04246-7
- Megan (Pocket, 2000) ISBN 0-671-04247-5
- Last Chance Cafe (Pocket Star, 2003) ISBN 0-671-04251-3

=== Vampire series ===
- Forever and the Night (Berkley, 1993) ISBN 0-425-14060-1
- For All Eternity (Berkley, 1994) ISBN 0-425-14456-9
- Time Without End (Berkley, 1995) ISBN 0-425-15042-9
- Tonight and Always (Berkley, 1996) ISBN 0-425-15541-2

=== Orphan Train series ===
- Lily and the Major (Pocket, 1990) ISBN 0-671-67636-9
- Emma and the Outlaw (Pocket, 1991) ISBN 0-671-67637-7
- Caroline and the Raider (Pocket, 1992) ISBN 0-671-67638-5

=== McKettrick series ===
- High Country Bride (Pocket, 2002) ISBN 0-7434-2273-2
- Shotgun Bride (Pocket Star, 2003) ISBN 0-7434-2274-0
- Secondhand Bride (Pocket, 2004) ISBN 0-7434-2275-9
- McKettrick's Choice (HQN Books, 2005) ISBN 0-373-77029-4
- Sierra's Homecoming (Silhouette, 2006) ISBN 0-373-24795-8
- McKettrick's Luck (Harlequin Books, 2007) ISBN 0-373-77185-1
- McKettrick's Pride (Harlequin Books, 2007) ISBN 0-373-77190-8
- McKettrick's Heart (Harlequin Books, 2007) ISBN 0-373-77194-0
- The McKettrick Way (Harlequin Books, 2007) ISBN 0-373-24867-9
- A McKettrick Christmas (Harlequin Books, 2008)
- McKettricks Of Texas: Tate (HQN Books, 2010) ISBN 978-0-373-77436-4
- McKettricks Of Texas: Garrett (HQN Books, 2010)
- McKettricks Of Texas: Austin (HQN Books, 2010)
- A Lawman's Christmas (HQN Books, 2011)
- An Outlaw's Christmas (HQN, Books, 2012)

=== Stone Creek series ===
- The Man From Stone Creek (HQN Books, 2007) ISBN 0-373-77198-3
- A Wanted Man (HQN Books, 2007) ISBN 0-373-77296-3
- The Rustler (HQN Books, 2008) ISBN 0-373-77330-7
- A Stone Creek Christmas (Silhouette, 2008) ISBN 0-373-24939-X
- The Bridegroom, due Aug 2009 (HQN Books, 2009) ISBN 978-0-373-77388-6
- At Home in Stone Creek, due Dec 2009 (Silhouette Special Edition) ISBN 978-0-373-65487-1

=== Montana Creed series ===
- Logan, (HQN Books 2009) ISBN 978-0-373-77353-4
- Dylan, (HQN Books 2009) ISBN 978-0-373-77358-9
- Tyler, (HQN Books 2009) ISBN 978-0-373-77364-0
- A Creed Country Christmas, (HQN Books 2009)
- A Creed in Stone Creek, (HQN Books 2011)
- Creed's Honor, (HQN Book 2011)
- The Creed Legacy, (HQN Book 2011)

=== Parable, Montana series ===
- Big Sky Country, (HQN Books 2012) ISBN 9780373776436
- Big Sky Mountain, (HQN Books 2012) ISBN 9780373776610
- Big Sky River, (HQN Books 2012) ISBN 9780373777204
- Big Sky Summer, (HQN Books 2013)
- Big Sky Wedding, (HQN Books 2013)
- Big Sky Secrets, (HQN Books 2014)

=== Time-Travel ===
- Here and Then (Silhouette, 1992) ISBN 0-373-09762-X
- There and Now (Silhouette, 1992) ISBN 0-373-09754-9
- Knights (Pocket, 1996) ISBN 0-671-87317-2
- Pirates (Pocket, 1996) ISBN 0-671-87316-4

=== Clare Westbrook ===
- Don't Look Now (Pocket Star, 2004) ISBN 0-671-04253-X
- Never Look Back (Pocket Star, 2005) ISBN 0-7434-7049-4
- One Last Look (Pocket, 2006) ISBN 0-7434-7051-6

=== Mojo Sheepshanks series ===
- Deadly Gamble, (HQN Books, 2008) ISBN 0-373-77200-9
- Deadly Deception, (HQN Books, 2008) ISBN 9780373772568
- Arizona Wild, (HQN Books, 2016) [Reissue of Deadly Gamble]
- Arizona Heat, (HQN Books December 27, 2016) [Reissue of Deadly Deception]

=== Australian series ===
- Moonfire (Pocket, 1988) ISBN 0-671-62198-X
- Angelfire (Pocket, 1991) ISBN 0-671-73765-1

=== The Corbins ===
- Banner O'Brien (Pocket, 1991) ISBN 0-671-73766-X
- Corbin's Fancy (Pocket, 1991) ISBN 0-671-73767-8
- Memory's Embrace (Pocket, 1991) ISBN 0-671-73769-4
- My Darling Melissa (Pocket, 2008) ISBN 1-4165-7058-6

=== The Quaid series ===
- Yankee Wife (Pocket, 1993) ISBN 0-671-73755-4
- Taming Charlotte (Pocket, 1993) ISBN 0-671-73754-6
- Princess Annie (Pocket, 1994) ISBN 0-671-79793-X

=== Writing as Lael St. James ===
- My Lady Wayward (Pocket, 2001) ISBN 0-671-53788-1
- My Lady Beloved (Pocket, 2001) ISBN 0-671-53787-3

=== Brides of Bliss County series ===
- The Marriage Pact, (HQN Books 2014)
- The Marriage Charm, (HQN Books 2015)
- The Marriage Season, (HQN Books 2015)
- Christmas In Mustang Creek, (HQN Books 2015)

=== Carsons of Mustang Creek series ===
- Once a Rancher, (HQN Books March 2016)
- Always a Cowboy, (HQN Books August 30, 2016)
- Forever a Hero, (HQN Book March 28, 2017)

=== Other ===
- Queen of the Rodeo as part of More than Words Vol 4 (Harlequin, 2008) ISBN 0-373-83622-8
- The Leopard's Woman (Silhouette, 2002) ISBN 0-373-48475-5
- Two Brothers (Pocket, 2001) ISBN 0-671-00401-8
- Courting Susannah (Pocket, 1998) ISBN 0-671-00400-X
- One Wish (Pocket, 2000) ISBN 0-671-53786-5
- The Vow (Pocket, 1998) ISBN 0-671-00399-2
- My Outlaw (Pocket, 1997) ISBN 0-671-87318-0
- Together (HarperTorch, 1996) ISBN 0-380-78405-X
- The Legacy (Pocket, 1994) ISBN 0-671-79792-1
- Daniel's Bride (Pocket, 1992) ISBN 0-671-73166-1
- Wild About Harry (Silhouette, 1991) ISBN 0-373-48340-6
- Glory, Glory, (Silhouette, 1990) ISBN 0-373-05607-9
- Escape From Cabriz, (Silhouette, 1990) ISBN 0-373-21881-8
- Mixed Messages (Mira, 1996) ISBN 1-55166-164-0
- Daring Moves, (Silhouette, 1990) ISBN 0-373-05547-1
- Just Kate, (Harlequin, 2005) ISBN 0-373-77091-X
- Only Forever (Mira, 1995) ISBN 1-55166-073-3
- Used-to-be-Lovers (Mira, 2002) ISBN 1-55166-896-3
- Wanton Angel (Pocket, 1991) ISBN 0-671-73772-4
- Lauralee (Pocket, 1986) ISBN 0-671-60049-4
- Ragged Rainbows (Mira, 1998) ISBN 1-55166-467-4
- State Secrets, (Mira, 1994) ISBN 1-55166-014-8
- State Secrets, Reissue(Harlequin Famous Firsts, due June 2009) ISBN 978-0-373-20004-7
- Part of the Bargain, (Silhouette, 1994) ISBN 0-373-45176-8
- Willow (Pocket, 1990) ISBN 0-671-66772-6
- Snowflakes on the Sea, (Silhouette, 1989) ISBN 0-373-57596-3
- Desire and Destiny (Pocket, 1990) ISBN 0-671-70635-7
- Fletcher's Woman (Pocket, 1991) ISBN 0-671-73768-6

== Awards ==
- 1990-1991 - Romantic Times Career Achievement Award for series Love and Laughter
- 1990-1991 - Romantic Times Reviewers' Choice Award for Best Historical Romance Sequel, Emma and the Outlaw
- 1991-1992 - Romantic Times Reviewers' Choice Award for Best Historical Romance, Daniel's Bride
- 1992-1993 - Romantic Times Career Achievement Award finalist for Historical Romance
- 1992-1993 - Romantic Times Reviewers' Choice Award finalist for Best Historical Romance, Yankee Wife
- 1993-1993 - Romantic Times Career Achievement Award finalist for Contemporary Fantasy
- 1993 - The Talisman Book of the Year, Forever and the Night
- 1993 - Affaire de Coeur Reader-Writer Award finalist for Outstanding Achiever
- 1993 - Affaire de Coeur Reader-Writer Award finalist for Best American Historical, Yankee Wife
- 1993-1994 - Romantic Times Reviewers' Choice Award finalist for Best Historical Romantic Adventure, Taming Charlotte
- 1993-1994 - Romantic Times Reviewers' Choice Award finalist for Best Contemporary Romantic Suspense, Forever and the Night
- 1994 - Waldenbooks Bestselling Trend Title (Vampire), For All Eternity
- 1995 - Romance Writers of America RITA Award finalist for Time Without End
- 1995 - Waldenbooks Bestselling Paranormal Title, Time Without End
- 1995-1996 - Romantic Times Reviewers' Choice Award for Best Historical Time-Travel, Knights
- 1996-1997 - Romantic Times Reviewers' Choice Award finalist for Best Contemporary Fantasy Romance, Tonight and Always
- 1997-1998 - Romantic Times Reviewers' Choice Award for Best Heroes
- 1997-1998 - Romantic Times Reviewers' Choice Award finalist for Best Innovative Historical Romance, The Vow
- 1997-1998 - Romantic Times Career Achievement Award for Historical Fantasy
- 1998 - Barnes & Noble.com Historical Romance Editor's Pick, Two Brothers
- 1998-1999 - Romantic Times Career Achievement Award finalist for Historical Storyteller of the Year
- 1998-1999 - Romantic Times Reviewers' Choice Award finalist forBest Historical Romance in a series, A Springwater Christmas
- 1999-2000 - Romantic Times Reviewers' Choice Award finalist for Best Historical Romance of the Year, One Wish
- 1999 - Greater Detroit Romance Writers of America Booksellers' Best Award for Best Long Historical Romance, A Springwater Christmas
- 2000 - Reviewers International Organization Dorothy Parker Award of Excellence Finalist for Favorite Historical Romance, Courting Susannah
- 2002 - Reviewers International Organization Dorothy Parker Award of Excellence Finalist for Favorite Contemporary Romance, Last Chance Cafe
- 2002 - The Word on Romance Reviewer's Rose Award finalist for Best Contemporary Romance, Last Chance Cafe
