= Rexanne Becnel =

American writer

- Occupation: Novelist
- Writing career
- Period: 1990–present
- Genres: Romance, Historical romance

Rexanne Becnel is an American romance novelist. She lives in New Orleans.

== Bibliography ==
=== Novels ===
- My Gallant Enemy (1990)
- Thief of My Heart (1991)
- The Rose of Blacksword (1992)
- Christmas Journey (1992)
- A Dove at Midnight (1993)
- The Christmas Wish (1993)
- Where Magic Dwells (1994)
- Heart of the Storm (1995)
- When Lightning Strikes (1996)
- The Maiden Bride (1996)
- Dangerous To Love (1997)
- The Bride of Rosecliffe (1998)
- The Knight of Rosecliffe (1999)
- The Mistress of Rosecliffe (2000)
- The Matchmaker (2001)
- The Troublemaker (2001)
- The Bridemaker (2002)
- The Heartbreaker (2003)
- Old Boyfriends (2005)
- The Payback Club (2006)
- Leaving L.A. (2006)
- Blink Of An Eye (2007)
- The Thief's Only Child (2011)

=== Short stories ===
- The Wager (1997)
- The Love Match (1998)
