= Kerrelyn Sparks =

American novelist

- Kerrelyn Sparks at the Romance Writers of America Conference, July 2015, New York, NY
- Occupation: Writer
- Writing career
- Period: 2005–present
- Genres: Paranormal and Historical Romance
- Website: kerrelynsparks.com

Kerrelyn Sparks is an American author of paranormal romance novels, best known for the Love at Stake series, currently comprising 17 novels. Each title in the Love at Stake series has become a USA Today bestseller, and she reached New York Times Best Seller list with The Undead Next Door, the fourth in the series. Her books are currently published under Avon Books.

== Biography ==
Kerrelyn was a tap dancer and then a high school French teacher before turning her creative bent to writing. She lives in the Greater Houston area with her husband and children.

== Bibliography ==
=== Love at Stake ===
1. How to Marry a Millionaire Vampire (2005)
2. Vamps and The City (2006)
3. Be Still My Vampire Heart (2007)
4. The Undead Next Door (2008)
5. All I Want for Christmas is a Vampire (2008)
6. Secret Life of a Vampire (2009)
7. Forbidden Nights with a Vampire (2009)
8. The Vampire and The Virgin (2010)
9. Eat Prey Love (2010)
10. Vampire Mine (2011)
11. Sexiest Vampire Alive (2011)
12. Wanted: Undead or Alive (2012)
13. Wild About You (2012)
14. The Vampire with the Dragon Tattoo (2013)
15. How to Seduce a Vampire (Without Really Trying) (2014)
16. Crouching Tiger, Forbidden Vampire (2014)

=== The Embraced ===
1. How to Tame a Beast in Seven Days (2017)
2. So I Married a Sorcerer (2017)
3. Eight Simple Rules for Dating a Dragon (2018)
4. How to Love your Elf (2020)
5. The Siren and the Deep Blue Sea (2020)
6. When a Princess Proposes (2022)
7. When a Dragon Falls (2023)

=== Historical Romance ===
1. For Love or Country (2002)
2. Less Than a Gentleman (2013)

=== Anthologies ===
- A Very Vampy Christmas in Sugarplums and Scandal (2006) with Lori Avocato, Dana Cameron, Mary Dahiem, Suzanne Macpherson, and Cait London. Part of the Love at Stake series
- V is for Vamp Woman in Vampires Gone Wild (2006) with Pamela Palmer, Amanda Arista, and Kim Falconer. Part of the Love at Stake series
- V is for Vamp Woman in It Happened One Valentine's Day: An Avon Romance Valentine's Day Sampler (2013) with Eloisa James, Lynsay Sands, Janiene Frost, Liz Carlyle, Pamela Palmer, Rachel Gibson, and Emma Cane. Part of the Love at Stake series
