= Kleinsasser =

Kleinsasser is a surname. Notable people with the surname include:

- Jim Kleinsasser (born 1977), American football player
- Leland Kleinsasser (1934–2025), American politician
- Lois Kleinsasser (born 1954), American writer
