= Agaliarept =

Demon in the Grimoirium Verum

In the Grimoirium Verum, Agaliarept is purported to be one of two demons directly under Lucifer, Satanachia being the other. The Grimoirium Verum also states that Agalierept and Tarihimal are the rulers of Elelogap, who in turn governs matters connected with water. The Grand Grimoire holds that Agaliarept is a general with the power to uncover secrets and reveal mysteries, and commands the second legion (including Buer, Gusoyn, and Botis).

== Modern fiction and games ==
Agaliarept is also the name given to the Demon King in two computer games published by Level 9 Computing in the 1980s as part of their Middle Earth trilogy: Adventure Quest and Dungeon Adventure.

An enemy from the popular 1990 role-playing video game, Final Fantasy III goes by the name of Agaliarept, however its design shows little to no significance to its namesake.

In the MMORPG Ultima Online, Agaliarept is one of the names randomly assigned to demons in various dungeons.

Agaliarept is featured in Wayne Barlowe's novel God's Demon, appearing as a bizarre gestalt entity serving as the court conjuror to Beelzebub.

The Action-Online-RPG The Ruins of the Lost Kingdom Online also has a Boss named Agaliarept (Japanese Katakana:"アガリアレプト") with 2 additional variations with added prefix "Demon-Lord [魔王]" and "Old Devil [老魔]".

Algaliarept (note spelling variation) is the name given to a demon in Kim Harrison's urban fantasy series about Rachel Morgan set in The Hollows.

In the anime Macademi Wasshoi!, Agaliarept is a highest-rank demon and ironically trying to save the world. He is also a friend of Gabriel, the archangel. She even calls him Aga-rin as a nickname.

In the game Lucius II, Agaliarept is one of the titles based on your scores that you can get at the end of every level.

== Other names/variants ==
- Agalierap
- Agalierept

== Resources ==
- The Grand Grimoire
- Grimoirium Verum or The True Grimoire. The Most Approved Keys of Solomon The Hebrew Rabbi. Translated From The Hebrew by Plangiere, Jesuit Dominicane. Edited, With A Preface By James Banner, Gent. Originally Published By Alibeck The AEgyptian at Memphis 1517. PDF edition, 1999 Phil Legard.

== See also ==
- Daemon (mythology)
- List of theological demons
