= Pamela Palmer =

American novelist

- Education: Auburn University
- Occupation: Writer
- Writing career
- Pen name: Pamela Montgomerie
- Period: 2007–present
- Genres: Paranormal and historical romance
- Website: www.pamelapalmer.net

Pamela Palmer is a National Best Selling author of romance novels. Her Feral Warrior books are published through Avon Books, her Esri books are published through Silhouette Nocturne, and her Jewels of Time books are published through Berkley Sensation.

== Biography ==
Pamela Palmer grew up in an Air Force household as her father was an Air Force pilot. She dreamed of being an astronaut as a child. She graduated Auburn University with a degree in Industrial Engineering and began working for a major computer manufacturer. She eventually turned to writing after having married and given birth to two children. She has also written under the name Pamela Montgomerie. As Montgomerie she writes historical time travel romance novels, while as using her real name, Palmer, she writes dark paranormal romance.

== Bibliography ==
=== As Pamela Palmer ===
==== The Feral Warriors ====
1. Desire Untamed (2009)
2. Obsession Untamed (2009)
3. Passion Untamed (2009)
4. Rapture Untamed (2010)
5. Hunger Untamed (2011)
6. Ecstasy Untamed (2011)
7. Love Untamed (2012)
8. Wulfe Untamed (2014)

==== The Esri series ====
1. The Dark Gate (2007)
2. Dark Deceiver (2008)
3. A Warrior's Desire (2012)
4. Warrior Rising (2012)

==== Vamp City series ====
1. A Blood Seduction (2012)
2. A Kiss of Blood (2013)
3. Of Blood and Passion (2015)

=== As Pamela Montgomerie ===
==== Jewels of Time ====
1. Sapphire Dream (2009)
2. Amethyst Destiny (2010)

=== Anthologies ===
- Hearts Untamed in Bitten by Cupid (2010) with Lynsay Sands and Jamie Rush. Part of the Feral Warriors series
- A Forever Love in Vampires Gone Wild (2013) with Kerrelyn Sparks, Amanda Arista, and Kim Falconer. Part of the Vamp City series
