= Larissa Ione =

American writer

- Occupation: Novelist
- Writing career
- Pen name: Sydney Croft
- Period: 2006 to present
- Genre: Romance
- Website: larissaione.com/blog

Larissa Ione is a USA Today and New York Times bestselling contemporary and paranormal romance author. She is published with Samhain, Red Sage Kensington and Grand Central Publishing under her own name, and along with Stephanie Tyler she is also one half of the writing team of Sydney Croft, whose books are published by Bantam Dell.

Larissa currently resides in Wisconsin with her Coast Guard husband and seventeen-year-old son.

== Bibliography as Larissa Ione ==
=== The Demonica series ===
==== Novels ====
1. Pleasure Unbound (June 20, 2008, ISBN 978-0-446-40103-6)
2. Desire Unchained (March 1, 2009, ISBN 978-0-446-40098-5)
3. Passion Unleashed (March 31, 2009, ISBN 978-0-446-40105-0)
4. Ecstasy Unveiled (February 1, 2010, ISBN 978-0-446-55682-8)
5. Sin Undone (August 24, 2010, ISBN 978-0-446-55681-1)
6. Reaver (January 1, 2013, ISBN 978-0-349-40076-1)
7. Revenant (December 16, 2014 ISBN 978-1-4055-2844-3)

==== Novellas and short stories ====
- Eternity Embraced a short story in The Mammoth Book of Vampire Romance 2 (September 22, 2009, ISBN 978-0-7624-3796-2) anthology with Jordan Summers, Deborah Cooke, Karen MacInerney, Caitlin Kittredge, Dina James, Camille Bacon-Smith, Rosemary Laurey, Patti O'Shea, Angie Fox, Caitlín R. Kiernan, Jamie Leigh Hansen, Carole Nelson Douglas, Diane Whiteside, Jaye Wells, Stacia Kane, Jennifer Ashley, Justine Musk, Jennifer St. Giles, Nancy Holder, Dawn Cook, Jeanne C. Stein, Tiffany Trent, Ann Aguirre, and Devon Monk. Note: The story takes place in the Demonica series timeline after book three.
- Eternity Embraced (Jan 20, 2011, ISBN 978-1-4524-7935-4) the expanded novella of the short story in The Mammoth Book of Vampire Romance 2.
- Vampire Fight Club (August 30, 2011, ISBN 978-1-4201-0988-7) a short story found in the anthology Supernatural with Alexandra Ivy, Jacquelyn Frank, and G.A. Aiken.
- Demonica: Overkill include short stories Wraith and Serena, Tayla and Eidolon, Kaden and Andrea and Luc and Kar (yet to be released). Available for free on her website.

==== Supplement ====
The Demonica Compendium. Available for free on her website.

=== Lords of Deliverance series ===
1. Eternal Rider (April 1, 2011, ISBN 978-0-446-57449-5)
2. Immortal Rider (November 22, 2011, ISBN 978-0-446-57447-1)
3. Lethal Rider (May 22, 2012, ISBN 978-0-446-57450-1)
4. Rogue Rider (November 20, 2012, ISBN 978-0-446-57448-8)

=== Other short stories ===
- Bloodlust Available for free on her website.
- Flesh to Fantasy story found in Secrets, Volume 18: Dark Passions (December 30, 2006, ISBN 978-0-9754516-8-7) anthology with Rae Monet, Linda Gayle, and Cynthia Eden.
- Wet Dreams story found in Secrets, Volume 21: Primal Heat (December 2007, ISBN 978-1-60310-001-4) anthology with Cynthia Eden, Kate St. James, and Mia Varano.

=== Other novels ===
- Snowbound (July 29, 2008, ISBN 978-1-59998-823-8)

== Bibliography as Sydney Croft ==
=== Agency of Covert Rare Operatives/ACRO series ===
==== Novels ====
1. Riding the Storm (August 28, 2007, ISBN 978-0-385-34080-9)
2. Unleashing the Storm (February 26, 2008, ISBN 978-0-385-34081-6)
3. Seduced by the Storm (July 29, 2008, ISBN 978-0-385-34082-3)
4. Taming the Fire (April 28, 2009, ISBN 978-0-385-34227-8)
5. Tempting the Fire (July 27, 2010, ISBN 978-0-385-34228-5)
6. Taken by Fire (June 28, 2011, ISBN 978-0-385-34229-2)
7. Three the Hard Way (November 29, 2014, ISBN 978-1-626-49234-9)

==== Short stories ====
- Shadow Play (May 20, 2008, ISBN 978-0-553-38517-5) in the Hot Nights, Dark Desires anthology with Eden Bradley and Stephanie Tyler.
- Code Word Storm (May 11, 2010, ISBN 978-0-7624-3843-3) in The Mammoth Book of Special Ops Romance anthology with Penny McCall, Rinda Elliot, Laura Griffin, Charlotte Mede, Shannon K. Butcher, Rachel Caine, Marliss Melton, Charlene Teglia, Michele Albert, Cheyenne McCray, Gina Robinson, Shiloh Walker, Jordan Summers, E.C. Sheedy, Caitlyn Nicholas, Liz Muir, Nicola Marsh, Gennita Low, and Debra Webb.

== Miscellaneous ==
The Write Ingredients (June 1, 2007, ISBN 978-1-59998-653-1) Over ninety authors, including Larissa Ione and Sydney Croft, and a handful of dedicated readers, offered up their favorite recipes. The proceeds go toward the Troop Project.
