= Dorothy Garlock =

American novelist

- Born: June 22, 1919; Grand Saline, Texas, U.S.
- Died: April 6, 2018 (aged 98); Clear Lake, Iowa, U.S.
- Occupation: Novelist
- Writing career
- Pen name: Dorothy Garlock, Johanna Phillips, Dorothy Phillips, Dorothy Glenn
- Period: 1980–2018
- Genres: Historical romance, contemporary romance
- Website: www.dorothygarlock.com

Dorothy Garlock (June 22, 1919 – April 6, 2018) was an American author of over 50 historical romance novels, most of them set in the American West. Many of her books became bestsellers. She also wrote under the pen names Johanna Phillips, Dorothy Phillips and Dorothy Glenn.

== Biography ==
Dorothy Garlock was born on June 22, 1919, in Texas, but spent twenty-five years in Oklahoma City. She and her husband moved to Clear Lake, Iowa in 1955. Garlock worked for fourteen years as a bookkeeper and columnist for the local newspaper before retiring at age 49. To fill her time while she and her husband spent winters in a small south-Texas town, Garlock began to write stories. She completed four manuscripts before she decided to try to publish one of them. In 1976, she entered one of her books in a contest for unpublished writers. Although it did not win the contest, one of the judges, an agent, offered to represent her. He sold all four of her books in a few weeks.

Over 20 million copies of Garlock's books are in print in 18 languages and 36 countries. She was one of the six launch authors for Bantam Books' Loveswept Line. Two of Garlock's short stories, "Interlude in Big Bend" and "Beneath the Midnight Sun", were chosen by Universal Press Syndicate to launch their series Day Dreams. The two stories were published one chapter each day for one month, and ran in 57 major newspapers. Her novel A Love for All Time has been used as an example in the textbook Writing Romantic Fiction, by Helen Barnhardt. Garlock is also a member of the Romance Writers Hall of Fame.

Garlock donated many of her manuscripts and other unpublished writings to the University of Iowa libraries. She and her husband, Herb Garlock Sr., lived in Clear Lake, Iowa. They have a son, a daughter, and several grandsons.

Dorothy Garlock died April 6, 2018, at the age of 98.

== Awards ==
- 1985 - Affaire de Coeur Silver Pen Award
- 1986 - Romantic Times Magazine Outstanding Western Writer
- 1986 - Affaire de Coeur Silver Pen Award
- 1987 - Affaire de Coeur Silver Pen Award
- 1988 - Affaire de Coeur Silver Pen Award
- 1988 - Reviewer Choice Award, Best Western Trilogy
- 1989 - Affaire de Coeur Silver Pen Award
- 1989 - Favorite Historical Author
- 1990 - Reviewer Choice Award, Best Western Saga
- 1991 - Romantic Times Award for Best Americana Novel
- 1997 - Romantic Times Lifetime Achievement Award

== Bibliography ==
=== As Dorothy Garlock ===
==== Stand alone novels ====
- Love and Cherish (1980)
- The Searching Hearts (1982)
- Glorious Dawn (1982)
- A Love for All Time (1983)
- The Planting Season (1984)
- Homeplace (1991)
- A Gentle Giving (1993)
- Tenderness (1993)
- Forever Victoria (1993)
- She Wanted Red Velvet (1996)
- This Loving Land (1996)
- More Than Memory (2001)
- Train from Marietta (2006)
- On Tall Pine Lake (2007)
- Will You Still Be Mine? (2007)
- The Moon Looked Down (2009)
- By Starlight (2012)
- Under a Texas Sky (2013)
- Take Me Home (2014)
- Twice in a Lifetime (2015)
- Sunday Kind of Love (2016)
- The Nearness of You (2017)

==== The Family Tucker series ====
1. Keep a Little Secret (2010)
2. Stay a Littler Longer (2011)
3. Come a Little Closer (2011)

==== Annie Lash series ====
1. Wild Sweet Wilderness (1985)
2. Annie Lash (1994)
3. Almost Eden (1995)

==== Colorado Wind series ====
1. Restless Wind (1986)
2. Wayward Wind (1986)
3. Wind of Promise (1987)

==== Wabash River series ====
1. Lonesome River (1987)
2. Dream River (1988)
3. River of Tomorrow (1988)
4. Yesteryear (1995)

==== Wyoming Frontier series ====
1. Midnight Blue (1989)
2. Nightrose (1990)
3. Sins of Summer (1994)
4. The Listening Sky (1996)
5. Larkspur (1997)
6. Sweetwater (1990)

==== Dolan Brothers series ====
1. Ribbon in the Sky (1991)
2. With Hope (1998)
3. With Song (1999)
4. With Heart (1999)
5. After the Parade (2000)
- Will You Still Be Mine?: With Heart / After The Parade (Omnibus) (2007)

==== Jazz Age series ====
1. The Edge of Town (2001)
2. High on a Hill (2002)
3. A Place Called Rainwater (2003)
4. River Rising (2005)

==== Route 66 series ====
1. Mother Road (2003)
2. Hope's Highway (2004)
3. Song of the Road (2004)

==== Omnibus ====
- Dreamkeepers: Strange Possession / Marriage To A Stranger (2005)
- Wishmakers: Hidden Dreams / She Wanted Red Velvet (2006)
- Loveseekers: Sing Softly To Me / Gentle Torment (2007)

=== As Johanna Phillips ===
(Reedited as Dorothy Garlock)

==== Single novels ====
- Gentle Torment (1981)
- Strange Possession (1982)
- Passion's Song (1982)
- Amber-Eyed Man (1982)
- Hidden Dreams (1983)

=== As Dorothy Phillips ===
==== Single novels ====
(Reedited as Dorothy Garlock)

- Marriage to a Stranger (1982)
- She Wanted Red Velvet (1986)
- Sing Softly to Me (1986)

=== As Dorothy Glenn ===
(Reedited as Dorothy Garlock)

==== Single novels ====
- Sunshine Every Morning (1985)
- The Hell Raiser (1990)

==== Anthologies in collaboration ====
- The Gentleman / The Hell Raiser (1997) (with Kristin James)
- A Daddy Again (1998) (with Dixie Browning and Joan Hohl)

== Sources ==
- "Dorothy Garlock Biography". Dorothy Garlock Homepage. Archived from the original on 2009-10-19.
- Knibbe Sr, Mary T. (July 1998). "An Interview with Dorothy Garlock". Dorothy Garlock Homepage. Archived from the original on 2009-10-19.
- "Papers of Dorothy Garlock Collection Guide". University of Iowa Libraries.
