= Candace Camp =

American novelist

Candace Pauline Camp Hopcus
- Born: Candace Pauline Camp; May 23, 1949 (age 77); Amarillo, Texas, U.S.
- Occupation: Novelist
- Spouse: Pete Hopcus (1980-present)
- Children: 1
- Writing career
- Pen name: Lisa Gregory, Kristin James, Sharon Stephens
- Language: English
- Period: 1978–present
- Genre: Romance
- Website: www.candace-camp.com

Candace Pauline Hopcus née Camp (May 23, 1949 in Amarillo, Texas) is an American writer of romance novels. She has also published under the pen names Lisa Gregory, Sharon Stephens, Kristin James and under her maiden name Candace Camp.

== Biography ==
Born Candace Pauline Camp on May 23, 1949 in Amarillo, Texas, she is the youngest of three children born to Lula Mae (Irons) and Grady Camp. Writing came naturally to her—her mother had been a newspaper reporter, and her father was the business manager of the Amarillo, Texas newspaper. Camp began writing down her own stories when she was 10, and often wrote when she needed to relax.

Camp attended the University of Texas at Austin and West Texas State University before becoming a teacher in Eureka Springs, Arkansas. After moving to North Carolina, she took a job in the trust department of a bank.

Camp then began law school at the University of North Carolina at Chapel Hill. At the same time, she began reading romance novels and decided to write one of her own. Camp finished her first novel, Bonds of Love while in law school. It was published in 1978 under the pen name Lisa Gregory. In the ensuing years, Camp has published over 43 books under four names: Lisa Gregory, Kristin James, Sharon Stephens and Candace Camp.

Camp married in 1980 with Pete Hopcus, and had a daughter.

== Bibliography ==
=== As Lisa Gregory ===
Single novels

- Bonds of Love 1978
- Analise 1981
- Crystal Heart 1982
- Bitterleaf 1983
- Light and Shadows 1985
- Solitaire 1988
- Seasons 1990
- Sisters 1991

The Rainbow's Turner Family series

1. The Rainbow Season 1979
2. The Rainbow Promise 1989

=== As Kristin James ===
Single novels

- Cara's Song 1982
- Dreams of Evening 1983
- Morning Star 1984
- Secret Fire 1984
- A Wedding Gift 1985
- A Very Special Favor 1986
- Cutter's Lady 1986
- Heartwood 1986
- Satan's Angel 1988
- The Gentleman 1990
- The Yankee 1990
- Salt of the Earth 1991
- The Letter of the Law 1991
- Once in a Blue Moon 1995
- The Last Groom on Earth 1996

The Sky series

1. The Golden Sky 1981
2. The Sapphire Sky 1981
3. The Summer Sky 1982
4. The Amber Sky 1982

Omnibus in collaboration

- Tumbleweed Christmas in "Historical Christmas Stories" 1989
- Daddy's Home (with Mary Lynn Baxter and Naomi Horton)
- Jesse's wife in "Promised Brides" 1994 (with Mary Jo Putney and Julie Tetel)
- The Gentleman in "The Gentleman and The Hellraiser" 1997 (with Dorothy Glenn)

=== As Sharon Stephens ===
Medievals Norwen series

1. The Black Earl (1982)

=== As Candace Camp ===
Medievals Norwen series

1. The Black Earl (1995) (Originally as Sharon Stephens, 1982)
2. Evensong (1995)

Single novels

- Rosewood (1991)
- Heirloom (1992)
- Suddenly (1996)
- Scandalous (1996)
- Impulse (1997)
- Indiscreet (1997)
- Impetuous (1998)
- Swept Away (1999)

The Lily series

1. Rain Lily (1993)
2. Flame Lily (1994)

Montford Heirs series

1. Stolen Heart (2000)
2. Promise Me Tomorrow (2000)
3. No Other Love (2001)

A Little Town in Texas series

1. Hard-headed Texan (2001)
2. Smooth-talking Texan (2002)

Aincourt's hearts series

1. So Wild a Heart (2002)
2. The Hidden Heart (2002)
3. Secrets of the Heart (2003)

Crazy Moreland Family series

1. Mesmerized (2003)
2. Beyond Compare (2004)
3. Winterset (2004)
4. An Unexpected Pleasure (2005)

Women and Men series

1. An Independent Woman (2006)
2. A Dangerous Man (2007)

The Matchmakers series

1. The Marriage Wager (2007)
2. The Bridal Quest (2008)
3. The Wedding Challenge (2008)
4. The Courtship Dance (2009)

The Willowmere series

1. A Lady Never Tells (2010)
2. A Gentleman Always Remembers (2010)
3. An Affair Without End (formerly titled A Diamond Never Deceives) (2011)

Legend of St. Dwynwen series

1. A Winter Scandal (2011)
2. A Summer Seduction (2012)
3. The Marrying Season (2013)

Omnibus in collaboration

- Tabloid Baby (1998) (in "Maternity Leave" with Cait London and Sherryl Woods)
- Somebody's Else Baby (2003) (in "Baby and All" with Myrna Mackenzie and Victoria Pade)
- Nine-month Knight / Paternity Test / Tabloid Baby (2004) (with Cait London and Sherryl Woods)
- Small Wonders (2004) (with Ann Major, Raye Morgan and Dallas Schulze)
- Motherhood (2005) (with Elizabeth Bevarly and Diana Palmer)
- Breaking Line in More Than Words Volume 5 (2009) (with Tara Taylor Quinn, Stephanie Bond, Brenda Jackson and Heather Graham)
