= Lynsay Sands =

Canadian author

- Born: Leamington, Ontario
- Occupation: Novelist
- Writing career
- Period: 1997 - present
- Genres: Romance, Historical, Contemporary, and Paranormal romance
- Website: lynsaysands.com

Lynsay Sands (born Leamington, Ontario) is a Canadian author of over 80 books. She is noted for the humor she injects into her stories. While she writes both historical and paranormal romance novels, she is best known for her Argeneau series about a modern family of vampires.

== Biography ==
Sands grew up in Southern Ontario. Before college, Sands sent in a manuscript to Harlequin Enterprises, but got a response asking for a rewrite and anything else she had written; taking this as a rejection Sands went on to study at the University of Windsor full-time while working full-time. Sands published her first novel, The Deed, in 1997.

Sands has written for three publishing houses: HarperCollins, Dorchester, and Kensington. Her novels have made the Waldenbooks, Barnes & Noble, USA Today and The New York Times Bestsellers lists.

== Awards ==
Sands has been nominated the Romantic Times Best Historical Romance and the Romantic Times Best Paranormal Romance awards, and has placed three times in the Reviewers International Organization (RIO) awards. She has won one P.E.A.R.L. (Paranormal Excellence Award for Romantic Literature) award and has been nominated several more times.

- 2000 P.E.A.R.L. Best Paranormal Anthology for Mistletoe & Magic

== Bibliography ==
=== Paranormal romance ===
==== Argeneau Series ====
1. A Quick Bite (Dorchester Publishing - September 2003)
2. Love Bites (Dorchester Publishing - January 2004)
3. Single White Vampire (Dorchester Publishing - July 2004)
4. Tall, Dark and Hungry (Avon HarperCollins - November 2005)
5. A Bite To Remember (Avon HarperCollins - July 2006)
6. Bite Me If You Can (Avon HarperCollins - February 2007)
7. The Accidental Vampire (Avon HarperCollins - January 2008)
8. Vampires Are Forever (Avon HarperCollins - February 2008)
9. Vampire, Interrupted (Avon HarperCollins - March 2008)
10. Born To Bite (Avon HarperCollins - September 2010)
11. Hungry For You (Avon HarperCollins - December 2010)
12. The Reluctant Vampire (Avon HarperCollins - May 2011)
13. Under A Vampire Moon (Avon HarperCollins - May 2012)
14. The Lady Is A Vamp (Avon HarperCollins - August 2012)
15. Immortal Ever After (Avon HarperCollins - February 2013)
16. One Lucky Vampire (Avon HarperCollins - September 2013)
17. Vampire Most Wanted (Avon HarperCollins - February 2014)
18. The Immortal Who Loved Me (Avon HarperCollins - February 2015)
19. About A Vampire (Avon Books - September 2015)
20. Runaway Vampire (Avon Books - February 2016)
21. Immortal Nights (Avon Books - September 2016)
22. Immortal Unchained (Avon Books - March 2017)
23. Immortally Yours (Avon Books - September 2017)
24. Twice Bitten (Avon Books - March 2018)
25. Vampires Like It Hot (Avon Books - September 2018)
26. The Trouble With Vampires (Avon Books - April 2019)
27. Immortal Born (Avon Books - September 2019)
28. Immortal Angel (Avon Books - September 2020)
29. Meant To Be Immortal (Avon Books - April 2021)
30. Mile High With A Vampire (HarperCollins Publishing - September 2021)
31. Immortal Rising (Avon Books - April 2022)
32. After the Bite (Avon Books - September 2022)
33. Bad Luck Vampire (Avon Books - September 2023)
34. Immortal By Morning (Avon Books - July 2025)

==== Rogue Hunter Series ====
1. The Rogue Hunter (Avon HarperCollins - September 2008)
2. The Immortal Hunter (Avon HarperCollins - March 2009)
3. The Renegade Hunter (Avon HarperCollins - September 2009)

==== Argeneau Anthologies ====
1. "The Gift" - in the anthology The Bite Before Christmas with Jeaniene Frost (Avon HarperCollins - October 2011)
2. "Vampire Valentine" - in the anthology Bitten By Cupid with Pamela Palmer and Jaime Rush (Avon HarperCollins - January 2010)

=== Contemporary novel ===
- The Loving Daylights (April 2003)

=== Historical novels ===
==== The Deed series ====
1. The Deed (April 1997)
2. The Key (February 1999)
3. The Chase (November 2004)

==== Devil of the Highlands series ====
1. Devil of the Highlands (January 2009)
2. Taming the Highland Bride (January 2010)
3. The Hellion And The Highlander (February 2010)

==== Madison Sisters series ====
1. The Countess (January 25, 2011)
2. The Heiress (February 22, 2011)
3. The Husband Hunt (February 28, 2012)

==== Highland Brides Series ====
1. An English Bride in Scotland (June 25, 2013)
2. To Marry a Scottish Laird (June 24, 2014)
3. The Highlander Takes a Bride (July 28, 2015)
4. Falling for the Highlander (January 31, 2017)
5. Surrender to the Highlander (January 30, 2018)
6. The Highlander's Promise (June 26, 2018)
7. The Wrong Highlander (January 29, 2019)
8. Hunting for a Highlander (January 28, 2020)
9. Highland Treasure (January 26, 2021)
10. Highland Wolf (January 25, 2022)
11. In Her Highlander's Bed (January 24, 2023)
12. he Highlander's Return (September 24, 2024)

==== Stand-alone historical novels ====
- The Switch (August 1999)
- Sweet Revenge (February 2000)
- Always (July 2000)
- Lady Pirate (January 2001)
- Bliss (September 2001)
- A Reluctant Reformer (February 2002)
- What She Wants (September 2002)
- The Perfect Wife (September 2005)
- Love Is Blind (August 2006)
- The Brat (May 2007)

=== Anthologies ===
- Five Gold Rings (Dorchester Publishing Co - October 1999) with Constance O'Banyon, Stobie Piel, and Flora Speer)
- Mistletoe & Magic (Dorchester Publishing Co - October 2000) (with Lisa Cach, Stobie Piel, and Amy Elizabeth Saunders)
- A Mother's Way (Dorchester Publishing Co - March 2002) with Lisa Cach, Susan Grant, and Julie Kenner)
- Wish List (Dorchester Publishing Co - October 2003) with Lisa Kleypas, Claudia Dain, and Lisa Cach)
- Dates From Hell (Avon HarperCollins - March 2006) (with Kim Harrison, Kelley Armstrong, and Lori Handeland)
- Holidays Are Hell (Avon HarperCollins - November 2007) (with Kim Harrison, Vicki Pettersson, and Marjorie M. Liu)

==== With Hannah Howell ====
- His Immortal Embrace (Kensington Publishing Co Inc - September 2003) with Sara Blayne, Hannah Howell and Kate Huntington)
- The Eternal Highlander (Kensington Publishing Co Inc - October 1999) with Hannah Howell.
- My Immortal Highlander (Kensington Publishing Co Inc - September 2006) with Hannah Howell.
- Highland Thirst (Kensington Publishing Co Inc - September 2007) with Hannah Howell.
