= Hannah Howell =

American novelist

Hannah Dustin Howell
- Hannah Howell at the Romance Writers of America Conference, July 2015, New York, NY
- Born: 1950 (age 75–76); Massachusetts, U.S.
- Occupation: Novelist
- Writing career
- Pen name: Hannah Howell
- Period: 1988–present
- Genre: historical romance

Hannah Dustin Howell (born 1950 in Massachusetts) is an American author of over 40 historical romance novels, many of which are set in medieval Scotland. She also writes under the names Sarah Dustin, Sandra Dustin, and Anna Jennet.c

== Biography ==
Howell is descended from some of the original American colonists, with her maternal ancestors settling in Massachusetts in the 1630s. While on a trip to England, Howell met her husband, aeronautical engineer Stephen, and they have been married for over forty years. They have two sons, Samuel and Keir, three grandchildren, and five cats.

Howell has twice been awarded the Golden Leaf Award and has been a Romance Writers of America RITA Award Finalist. She has also won several awards from the Romantic Times Bookclub Magazine.

== Bibliography ==
=== Highland Brides ===
- His Bonnie Bride (Amber Flame) (1988) -Tavis MacLagan e Storm Eldon
- Promised Passion (Highland Wedding) (1988)-Sir Iain MacLagan’s e Islaen MacRoth
- Reckless (1993) (writing as Anna Jennet) -Ailis Macfarlane e Alexander MaDubh

=== Murray Family ===
- Highland Destiny (1998) - Sir Balfour Murray e Maldie Kirkaldy
- Highland Honor (1999) - Nigel Murray e Gisele knew
- Highland Promise (1999) - Eric Murray e Bethia Drummond’s
- Highland Vow (2000) - Elspeth Murray e Cormac Armstrong
- Highland Knight (2001) - Cameron MacAlpin e Avery Murray
- Highland Bride (2002) - Gillyanne Murray e Sir Connor MacEnroy
- Highland Angel (2003) - Sir Payton Murray e Kirstie MacLye
- Highland Groom (2003) -Sir Diarmot MacEnroy e Ilsa Campbell
- Highland Conqueror (2005) - Sigimor Cameron e Lady Jolene Gerard
- Highland Barbarian (2006) - Sir Artan Murray e Cecily Donaldson knows
- Highland Lover (2006) - Gregor MacFingal Cameron e Alana Murray’s
- Highland Savage (2007) - Sir Lucas Murray e Katerina Haldane
- Highland Wolf (2008) - Annora MacKay e James Drummond
- Highland Sinner (2008) - Sir Tormand Murray e Morainn Ross
- Highland Captive (2008) - Aimil Mengue e Parlan MacGuin
- Highland Fire (2008) - Moira Robertson e Tavig MacAlpin
- Highland Protector (2010) - Sir Simon Innes e Ilsabeth Murray Armstrong
- Highland Warrior(2010) - Ewan MacFingal e Fiona MacEnroy
- Highland Hero (2011) - novella
- Highland Champion (2011) - Liam Cameron e Keira Murray MacKail
- Highland Avenger (2012) - Sir Brian MacFingal e Arianna Murray Lucette
- Highland Master (2013) - Sir Brett Murray e Triona McKee’s
- Highland Guard (2015) - Sir Harcourt Murray e Annys MacQueen
- Highland Chieftain(2016) - Sir Callum MacMillan e Bethoc Matheson
- Highland Devil (2018) - Sir Gybbon Murray's e Mora Ogilvy - Expected publication: July 31, 2018

=== Murray/MacEnroys ===
- Highland Groom (NOV 2003)
- Highland Warrior (2004)

=== Murray/Camerons ===
- Highland Conqueror (2005)
- Highland Champion (2011)
- Highland Lover (2006)

=== Wherlocke Series ===
- If He's Wicked (2009)
- If He's Sinful (2009)
- If He's Wild (2010)
- If He's Dangerous (June 2011)
- If He's Tempted (2013)
- If He's Daring (2014)
- If He's Noble (2015)

=== Vampire Series / The MacNachtons ===
- The Eternal Highlander “Nightriders” (2005) (with Lynsay Sands)
- Highland Vampire “Kiss of the Vampire” (2006) (with Adrienne Basso and Debbie Raleigh)
- My Immortal Highlander “The Hunt” (2007) (with Lynsay Sands)
- Eternal Lover "The Yearning" (2008) (with Jackie Kessler and Richelle Mead and Lynsay Sands)
- Highland Thirst “Blood Feud” (2008) (with Lynsay Sands)
- Nature of the Beast “Dark Hero” (2009) (with Adrienne Basso and Eve Silver)
- Highland Beast “The Beast Within” (2010) (with Heather Grothaus and Victoria Dahl)
- Yours for Eternity “Highland Blood” (2011) (with Alexandra Ivy and Kaitlin O'Riley)
- Highland Hunger "Dark Embrace" (2012) (with Michele Sinclair and Jackie Ivie)
- Born to Bite "Dark Secret" (2013) (with Diana Cosby and Erica Ridley)

=== Standalone novels ===
- A Taste of Fire (1988) (writing as Sarah Dustin)
- Compromised Hearts (1989)
- Elfking's Lady (Highland Captive) (1990)
- Stolen Ecstasy (1991)
- Conqueror's Kiss (1991)
- Beauty and the Beast (1992)
- Silver Flame (1992)
- Wild Conquest (1993)
- Kentucky Bride (1994)
- Only for You (1995)
- Fire (Highland Fire) (1995) (writing as Anna Jennet)
- My Lady Captor (1996) (writing as Anna Jennet)
- My Valiant Knight (1996)
- Unconquered (1996)
- Wild Roses (1997)
- A Stockingful of Joy (1999)
- Highland Hearts (2002)

=== Anthologies ===
- Baby Dreams (1996) (with Barbara Benedict, Phoebe Conn, Carol Finch, Jo Goodman and Jane Kidder)
- A Joyous Season (1996) (with Olga Bicos, Jennifer Blake and Fern Michaels)
- Scottish Magic: Four Spellbinding Tales of Magic And Timeless Love (1997) (with Mandalyn Kaye, Elizabeth Ann Michaels and Stobie Piel)
- Castle Magic (1999) (with Colleen Faulkner, Judith E French)
- Magically Delicious (2002) (with Jo Goodman and Linda Madl)
