= Laura Wright (author) =

American author of romance novels

- Born: March 12, 1970 (age 56); Minnesota, U.S.
- Occupation: Novelist
- Spouse: Daniel Ionazzi
- Children: 2
- Writing career
- Period: 2002–present
- Genre: Romance
- Website: www.laurawright.com

Laura Wright (born March 12, 1970) is an American author of romance novels.

== Biography ==
Wright was born in Minnesota. As an adult, she pursued a career as an actress, singer and competitive ballroom dancer, teaching ballroom dancing and Latin dancing for more than ten years. After many years of reading romance novels, Wright left dancing and attempted to write romantic fiction. After three years of writing, she sold a manuscript to Harlequin books for their Silhouette Desire line of category romances.

Wright has been twice nominated for a Romantic Times Reviewer's Choice Award, for Baby and the Beast (2002) and for Redwolf's Woman (2004).

She is married and lives in Los Angeles, California, with her husband and their two children.

== Works ==
=== Mark of the Vampire ===
- "Eternal Hunger" (Oct 2010) ISBN 978-0-451-23149-9
- "Eternal Kiss" (April 2011) ISBN 978-0-451-23384-4
- "Eternal Blood, E-reader" (Jan 2012) ISBN 978-1-101-53950-7
- "Eternal Captive" (Feb 2012) ISBN 978-0-451-23587-9
- "Eternal Beauty, E-reader" (May 2012) ISBN 978-1-101-57930-5
- "Eternal Beast" (Aug 2012) ISBN 978-0-451-23772-9
- "Eternal Demon" (May 2013) ISBN 978-0-451-23975-4
- "Eternal Sin" (Nov 2013) ISBN 978-0-451-24016-3

=== Wicked Ink Chronicles ===
- "First Ink, e-reader" (Dec 17, 2013) ISBN 978-0-986-06418-0
- "Shattered Ink, e-reader" (Dec 17, 2013) ISBN 978-0-986-06419-7
- "Rebel Ink, e-reader" (May 26, 2015) ISBN 978-0-986-16312-8

=== Novels ===
- Hearts Are Wild (2002)
- Cinderella and the Playboy (2002)
- Baby and the Beast (2002)
- Locked Up with a Lawman (2003)
- Ruling Passions (2003)
- Charming the Prince (2003)
- Sleeping with Beauty (2003)
- A Bed of Sand (2004)
- Lawman (2004)
- Redwolf's Woman (2004)
- Her Royal Bed (2005)
- Savor the Seduction (2005)
- The Sultan's Bed (2005)
- Millionaire's Calculated Baby Bid (2007)
- Playboy's Ruthless Payback (2007)
- Rich Man's Vengeful Seduction (2007)

=== Bayou Heat (with Alexandra Ivy) ===
Each book in this series has one book written by each author

1. Raphael/Parish (2013) ISBN 978-0-9886-2452-8
2. Bayon/Jean-Baptiste (2013) ISBN 978-0-9886-2455-9
3. Talon/Xavier (2013) ISBN 978-0-9886-2457-3
4. Sebastian/Aristide (2013) ISBN 978-0-9860-6413-5
5. Lian/Roch (2014) ISBN 978-0-9899-9072-1
6. Hakan/Severin (2014) ISBN 978-0-9899-9074-5
7. Angel/Hiss (2015) ISBN 978-0-9899-9078-3
8. Rage/Killian (2015) ISBN 978-1-9408-8765-4
9. Michel/Striker (2015) ISBN 978-0-9861-9492-4
10. Ice/Reaux (January 18, 2016) ISBN 978-0-9861-9494-8
11. Kayden/Simon (August 9, 2016) ISBN 978-1-9422-9929-5

==== Short stories ====
- Bayou Noel [Bayou Heat, Book 3.5] (2013)

=== Omnibus ===
- Cinderella and the Playboy / Quade – The Irresistible One (2004) (with Bronwyn Jameson)
- Plain Jane and the Hotshot / Charming the Prince (2004) (with Meagan McKinney)
- The Cowboy Claims His Lady / Sleeping with Beauty (2004) (with Meagan McKinney)
- Full Throttle / Ruling Passions (2004) (with Merline Lovelace)
- Meeting at Midnight / Bed of Sand (2004) (with Eileen Wilks)
- A Tempting Engagement / Redwolf's Woman (2004) (with Bronwyn Jameson)
- Mail-order Prince in Her Bed / Hearts are Wild (2004) (with Kathryn Jensen)
- Taken by Storm: Whirlwind / Upsurge / Wildfire (2005) (with Kathie DeNosky, Kristi Gold)
- Having the Best Man's Baby / Baby and the Beast (2005) (with Shawna Delacorte)
- Secrets, Lies... and Passion / Baby and the Beast (2005) (with Linda Conrad)
- Entangled with a Texan / Locked Up with a Lawman (2005) (with Sara Orwig)
- Sleeping with Beauty / Her Convenient Millionaire (2005) (with Gail Dayton)
- Whatever Reilly Wants... / Sultan's Bed (2005) (with Maureen Child)
- A Bed Of Sand / Principles and Pleasures (2005) (with Margaret Allison)
- Rock Me All Night / Her Royal Bed (2005) (with Katherine Garbera)
- Heart of the Raven / Sultans Bed (2006) (with Susan Crosby)
- Kept Woman / Her Royal Bed (2006) (with Sheri Whitefeather)
- Savour the Seduction / Name Your Price (2006) (with Barbara McCauley)
- Dangerous Desires (2007) (with Kathie DeNosky, Kristi Gold)
