= Alexandra Ivy =

American novelist

- Occupation: Novelist
- Writing career
- Pen name: Deborah Raleigh
- Period: 2000–present
- Genres: Regency romance, Paranormal romance, Romance
- Website: alexandraivy.com/index.htm

Alexandra Ivy is an American novelist mostly known for her New York Times Best Selling contemporary paranormal series Guardians of Eternity. She also writes regency historicals using the name Deborah or Debbie Raleigh. Her writing has gained high acclaim in the romance genre, earning Romantic Times magazine 'Top Pick' nominations for When Darkness Comes and Embrace the Darkness.

== Bibliography as Alexandra Ivy ==
=== Guardians of Eternity series ===
==== Novels ====
1. When Darkness Comes (2007) ISBN 978-1-4201-2529-0
2. Embrace the Darkness (2007) ISBN 978-0-8217-7937-8
3. Darkness Everlasting (2008) ISBN 978-0-8217-9392-3
4. Darkness Revealed (2009) ISBN 978-1-4201-0296-3
5. Darkness Unleashed (2009) ISBN 978-1-4201-0297-0
6. Beyond the Darkness (2010) ISBN 978-1-4201-0298-7
7. Devoured by Darkness (2010) ISBN 978-1-4201-1135-4
8. Bound by Darkness (2011) ISBN 978-1-4201-1136-1
9. Fear the Darkness (2012) ISBN 978-1-4201-1137-8
10. Darkness Avenged (2013) ISBN 978-1-4201-1138-5
11. Hunt the Darkness (2014) ISBN 978-1-4201-2515-3
12. When Darkness Ends (2015) ISBN 978-1-4201-2517-7
13. Darkness Returns (2019)

==== Dragons of Eternity series ====
1. Burned by Darkness (2015)
2. Scorched by Darkness (2016)

==== Short stories ====
- Taken by Darkness [Guardians of Eternity, Book 7.5] in the Yours for Eternity anthology with Hannah Howell and Kaitlin O'Riley. (2011) ISBN 978-1-4201-1228-3
- Darkness Eternal [Guardians of Eternity, Book 7.6] in the Supernatural anthology with Larissa Ione, Jacquelyn Frank, and G.A. Aiken. (2011) ISBN 978-1-4201-0988-7
- Where Darkness Lives [Guardians of Eternity, Book 8.5] in The Real Werewives of Vampire County anthology with Angie Fox, Jess Haines, and Tami Dane. (2011) ISBN 978-0-7582-6158-8
- Levet [Guardians of Eternity, Book 9.5] e-book
- A Very Levet Christmas [Guardians of Eternity, Book 11.5] e-book

=== Immortal Rogues trilogy ===
1. My Lord Vampire (2012) ISBN 978-1-4201-2271-8 - This is a reprint from the 2003 historical vampire series written as Deborah Raleigh
2. My Lord Eternity (2012) ISBN 978-1-4201-2861-1 - This is a reprint from the 2003 historical vampire series written as Deborah Raleigh
3. My Lord Immortality (2012) ISBN 978-1-4201-2272-5 - This is a reprint from the 2003 historical vampire series written as Deborah Raleigh

=== Sentinels series ===
==== Novels ====
1. Born in Blood (2013) ISBN 978-1-4201-2514-6
2. Blood Assassin (2014) ISBN 978-1-4201-2516-0
3. Blood Lust (May 2016)

==== Short stories ====
- Out of Control [Sentinels, Book 0.5] in the Predatory anthology with Nina Bangs, Dianne Duvall, and Hannah Jayne (2013) ISBN 978-1-4201-2512-2
- On the Hunt [Sentinels, Book 2.5] in the On the Hunt anthology with Rebecca Zanetti, Dianne Duvall, and Hannah Jayne (2015) ISBN 978-1-4201-2513-9

=== Rapture series ===
1. First Rapture (2013) e-book
2. Sinful Rapture (2014) e-book
3. Sweet Rapture (2016) e-book

=== Bayou Heat (with Laura Wright) ===
Each book in this series has one book written by each author

==== Novels ====
1. Raphael/Parish (2013) ISBN 978-0-9886-2452-8
2. Bayon/Jean-Baptiste (2013) ISBN 978-0-9886-2455-9
3. Talon/Xavier (2013) ISBN 978-0-9886-2457-3
4. Sebastian/Aristide (2013) ISBN 978-0-9860-6413-5
5. Lian/Roch (2014) ISBN 978-0-9899-9072-1
6. Hakan/Severin (2014) ISBN 978-0-9899-9074-5
7. Angel/Hiss (2015) ISBN 978-0-9899-9078-3
8. Rage/Killian (2015) ISBN 978-1-9408-8765-4
9. Michel/Striker (2015) ISBN 978-0-9861-9492-4
10. Ice/Reaux (January 18, 2016) ISBN 978-0-9861-9494-8
11. Kayden/Simon (August 9, 2016) ISBN 978-1-9422-9929-5

==== Short stories ====
- Bayou Noel [Bayou Heat, Book 3.5] (2013)

=== Illegitimate Bachelor ===
1. Bedding the Baron (2014) e-book reprint of a 2008 historical romance novel written as Deborah Raleigh
2. Seducing the Viscount (2014) e-book reprint of a 2008 historical romance novel written as Deborah Raleigh
3. Seduce Me By Christmas (2014) e-book reprint of a 2008 historical romance novel written as Deborah Raleigh

=== Hellion's Den series ===
1. Some Like It Wicked (2014)
2. Some Like It Sinfull (2014)
3. Some Like It Brazen (2014)

== Bibliography as Deborah 'Debbie' Raleigh ==
=== A Rose for Three Rakes trilogy ===
1. A Bride for Lord Challmond (2001) ISBN 0-8217-6771-2
2. A Bride for Lord Wickton (2001) ISBN 0-8217-6796-8
3. A Bride for Lord Brasleigh (2001) ISBN 0-8217-6814-X

=== Vicar Humbley trilogy ===
1. A Proper Marriage (2002) ISBN 0-8217-7374-7
2. A Convenient Marriage (2002) ISBN 0-8217-7375-5
3. A Scandalous Marriage (2003)ISBN 0-8217-7376-3

=== Immortal Rogues trilogy ===
1. My Lord Vampire (2003) ISBN 0-8217-7549-9
2. My Lord Eternity (2003) ISBN 0-8217-7550-2
3. My Lord Immortality (2003) ISBN 0-8217-7551-0

=== Single Novels ===
- Lord Carlston's Courtship (2000) ISBN 0-8217-6463-2
- Lord Mumford's Minx (2000) ISBN 0-8217-6673-2
- The Christmas Wish (2001) ISBN 0-8217-7169-8
- The Valentine Wish (2002)ISBN 0-8217-7170-1
- The Wedding Wish (2002) ISBN 0-8217-7171-X
- Miss Frazer's Adventure (2005) ISBN 0-8217-7780-7
- The Wedding Clause (2005) ISBN 0-8217-7825-0
- Some Like It Wicked (2005)ISBN 0-8217-7855-2
- Some Like It Sinful (2006) ISBN 0-8217-7856-0
- Some Like It Brazen (2007) ISBN 0-8217-7857-9
- Bedding the Baron (2008) ISBN 978-0-8217-8044-2
- Seducing the Viscount (2009) ISBN 978-0-8217-8044-2
- Seduce My by Christmas (2009) ISBN 978-0-8217-8046-6

=== Short stories ===
- The Naughty Kitten in the Spring Kittens anthology with Alana Clayton and Kate Huntington. (2000) ISBN 0-8217-6538-8
- The Merry Cupids in the Valentine Rogues anthology with Cindy Holbrook and Donna Simpson. (2001) ISBN 0-8217-6772-0
- Christmas Miracle in the Christmas Eve Kittens anthology with Cathleen Clare and Wilma Counts. (2001) ISBN 0-8217-7038-1
- One Night with Lucifer in the Only with a Rogue anthology with Adrienne Basso and Colleen Faulkner. (2002) ISBN 0-8217-7263-5
- Night of Seduction in the One Night with a Rogue anthology with Candace McCarthy and Linda Madl. (2002) ISBN 0-8217-7263-5
- The Elusive Bride in the A Taste of Christmas anthology with Alice Holden and Joy Reed. (2002) ISBN 0-8217-7288-0
- A Mother at Heart in the A Husband for Mama anthology with Mary Blayney and Julia Parks. (2003) ISBN 0-8217-7491-3
- The Bewitchment of Lord Dalford in the A Bewitching Season anthology with Lynn Collum and Jeanne Savery. (2003) ISBN 0-8217-7487-5
- "Marlow's Nemesis" in the My Favorite Rogue anthology with Lynn Collum and Victoria Hinshaw. (2004) ISBN 0-8217-7638-X
- To Woo a Duke in the How to Marry a Duke anthology with Sandy Blair and Regan Allen. (2005) ISBN 0-8217-7797-1
- To Tame the Beast in the Highland Vampire anthology with Hannah Howell and Adrienne Basso.(2005) ISBN 0-7582-1155-4
