= Rebecca Zanetti =

American novelist

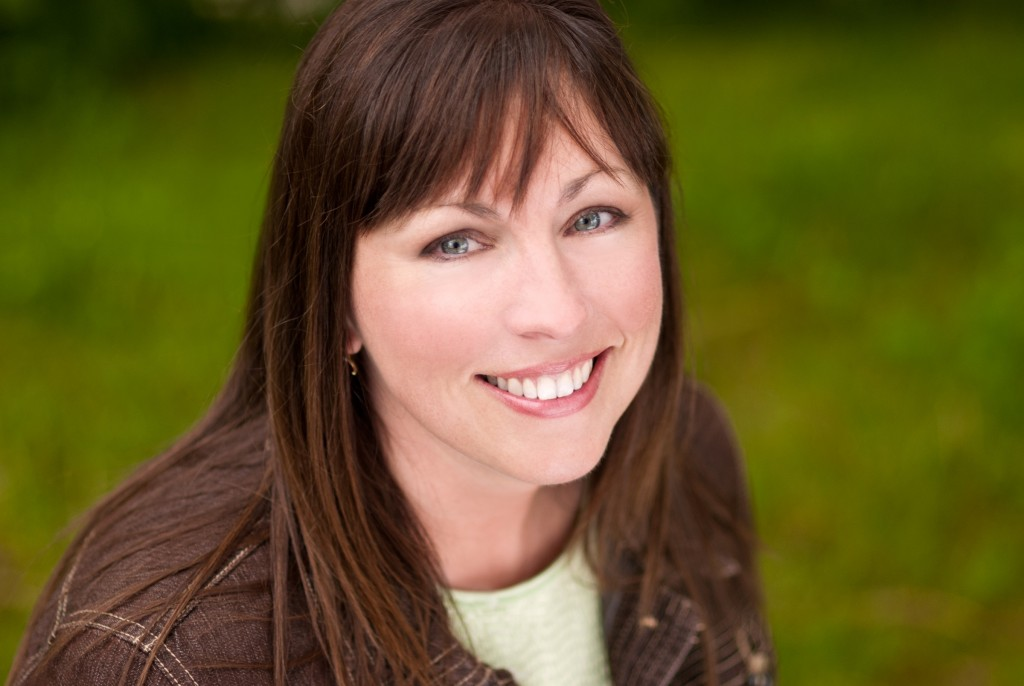
- Born: United States
- Education: Pepperdine University (BA); University of Idaho (JD)
- Occupation: Writer
- Writing career
- Period: 2011–present
- Genres: paranormal romance, contemporary romance, romantic suspense
- Website: www.rebeccazanetti.com

Rebecca Zanetti is a New York Times and USA Today bestselling author of paranormal romance, contemporary romance, and romantic suspense.

== Biography ==
Zanetti earned a B.A. in journalism from Pepperdine University, with a Political Science emphasis. At Pepperdine, she was the editor-in-chief of The Graphic newspaper and interned for former President Ronald Reagan. She was also a member of the Pi Phi Sorority.

After graduation, she was an art curator and an aide for U.S. Senator Dirk Kempthorne. She entered law school and earned her Juris Doctor from the University of Idaho. She was admitted to the Idaho State Bar Association in 1999 and worked for both large and small firms. In 2010, she ended her contract as hearing examiner for Kootenai County, Idaho to temporarily concentrate on writing and family. After that, she taught law, but quit in November 2013 to write full-time. She lives in the Pacific Northwest with her husband, children, and extended family.

Zanetti is a member of Novelist's Inc. (NINC) and the International Thriller Writer's organization. She is a former member of the Idaho State Bar Association, board member of Wisdomworks, board member of CASA, and board member of the Women's Center.

== Writing career ==
"I like switching back and forth between genres because there’s no chance to get bored in doing so. The paranormals are fun to write because anything goes. When you’re making up a world, you can create whatever dimensions you’d like. With the romantic suspense, I just love the twists and turns…and surprises. It’s wonderful getting a fan email that they didn’t see something coming. Finally, the contemporaries are a nice break from the darker genres."
- Rebecca Zanetti

Zanetti started writing in December 2009 during a blizzard in Northern Idaho Her first finished romance was a paranormal YA, then she wrote a chick lit and then a vampire romance, Fated.

A year later, Zanetti sent out queries for Fated and within five days had offers from Kensington and Caitlin Blasdell with Liza Dawson Associates. Fated was released in March 2011 from Kensington Brava as book one in the Dark Protectorate series. Book five in the series, Provoked, was the first of her books to hit the USA Today Bestseller List. Subsequent books in the series, Shadowed and Tamed (novella), also hit the list, with Marked making the New York Times Bestseller list.

Two books in this series, Consumed and Shadowed, were later included in the Lyrical Press-Books-A-Million High Notes program Books-A-Million

Zanetti's Sin Brothers Series was published by Grand Central Forever in 2013. Forgotten Sins, Sweet Revenge, and Blind Faith, were all Top Pick Reviews at RT Book Reviews, with Blind Faith and Total Surrender hitting the USA Today bestseller list.

Also in 2013, Zanetti signed a four-book deal with Entangled Publishing for its Brazen Line. The third book, Rising Assets, was the first of her books to hit the New York Times bestseller list. The fourth book, Over the Top, released in July 2015.

In 2014, Zanetti signed two new contracts with Kensington Publishing. The first, a four book Dark Protector spinoff called the Realm Enforcers, was first released digitally, including Wicked Ride on June 23, 2015, followed by Wicked Edge and Wicked Burn.

The other contract was for a three-book series called the Scorpius Syndrome for the Kensington Zebra mass market imprint. Scorpius Rising, a prequel novella, was released in August 2015 in the On the Hunt anthology also featuring Alexandra Ivy, Dianne Duvall, and Hannah Jayne. The first book, Mercury Striking, was published in February 2016, with Shadow Falling scheduled for an August 30, 2016 release and the third book, Justice Ascending, in January 2017.

Zanetti is also part of the 1001 Dark Nights coalition, with the Dark Protector's novellas Teased, Tricked (October 2016) and Tangled (March 2017).

== On writing ==
In an interview, she discussed how her career as a lawyer affected her writing: "...law is about boiling a lot of facts down to one main theme and articulating that theme to other people. Writing is much the same. And believe it or not, your voice as a lawyer (how you get the facts across genuinely to a jury or judge) is similar to your voice as a writer – it’s all you. Also, both worlds are competitive and a bit scary but well worth it."

== Reception ==
- Rising Assets, Marked, and Total Surrender have hit the New York Times Bestseller list.
- Blind Faith, Provoked, Shadowed, Tamed, Rising Assets, Total Surrender, Wicked Ride, Wicked Edge, and Wicked Burn have hit the USA Today Bestseller list.
- Forgotten Sins, Sweet Revenge, Total Surrender, Blind Faith, Marked, Wicked Edge, and Wicked Burn have all been 4.5 stars, Top Picks from RT Book Reviews.
- Total Surrender and Wicked Edge were Finalists for 2016 Romance Writers of America (RWA) Daphne du Maurier Awards for Excellence in Mystery/Suspense.
- Wicked Edge received a starred review in Publishers Weekly.

== Selected bibliography ==
=== The Dark Protectors ===
- Fated
- Claimed
- Tempted (novella)
- Hunted
- Consumed
- Provoked
- Twisted (novella)
- Shadowed
- Tamed (novella)
- Marked
- Teased (novella in 1001 Dark Nights collection)
- Tricked (novella in 1001 Dark Nights collection)
- Tangled (novella in 1001 Dark Nights collection)

=== Maverick Montana Series ===
- Against the Wall
- Under the Covers
- Rising Assets
- Over the Top

=== Sin Brothers Series ===
- Forgotten Sins
- Sweet Revenge
- Blind Faith
- Total Surrender

=== Blood Brothers Series ===
- Deadly Silence
- Lethal Lies (April 2017)

=== Realm Enforcer Series ===
- Wicked Ride
- Wicked Edge
- Wicked Burn
- Wicked Kiss (summer 2017)
- Wicked Bite (summer 2017)

=== Scorpius Syndrome Series ===
- Scorpius Rising (ON THE HUNT Anthology)
- Mercury Striking
- Shadow Falling
- Justice Ascending

=== Rising Storm Soap Opera Series ===
- Take the Storm (Season 1, Episode 6)
- Against the Wind (Season 2, Episode 1)

== Reviews ==
- Jessie Potts, Special for USA Today. Must-read Romances. usatoday.com December 24, 2014.
- Sarah Maclean. Sarah MacLean picks the best romance novels to read this month. washingtonpost.com October 7, 2016.

== Interviews ==
- USA Today. Author inspirations: A persistent vampire, Ocean's Eleven, and Pretty Woman. usatoday.com. December 24, 2014.
- Estep, Jennifer. Q&A with Rebecca Zanetti.. www.jenniferestep.com. December 15, 2014.

== Awards ==
=== Blood Brothers Series ===
- Lethal Lies: RT Magazine Top Pick
- Deadly Silence: 2016 RT Reviewer's Choice Award for best Paranormal Romantic Suspense, iBooks top 25 Books October 2016, 2017 PRISM Award Finalist, Amazon Best Books of the Month October 2016, RT Magazine Top Pick
- Twisted Truths: 2017 RT Reviewer's Choice Award for Best Paranormal Romantic Suspense, RT Magazine Top Pick

=== Realm Enforcer Series ===
- Wicked Burn: RT Magazine Top Pick, 2016 RT Reviewer's Choice Nomination for Best Digital or Self-Published Romantic Suspense
- Wicked Edge: Publishers Weekly Starred Review, 2016 Daphne Du Maurier Award for Excellence in Mystery/Suspense Nominee for Best Paranormal Romantic Mystery/Suspense, RT Magazine Top Pick
- Wicked Kiss: RT Magazine Top Pick

=== Scorpius Syndrome Series ===
- Mercury Striking:2017 RWA Daphne du Maurier Award Winner for Excellence in Mystery/Suspense for Best Paranormal Romantic Mystery/Suspense, Amazon Best Romances of 2016,
- Shadow Falling: Night Owl Reviews Top Pick
- Justice Ascending: Night Owl Reviews Top Pick

=== Dark Protector Series ===
- Twisted: Night Owl Reviews Top Pick
- Shadowed:2014 Daphne Du Maurier Award for Excellence in Mystery/Suspense Nominee for Best Paranormal Romantic Mystery/Suspense
- Marked: 2015 Daphne Du Maurier Award for Excellence in Mystery/Suspense Nominee for Best Paranormal Romantic Mystery/Suspense, RT Magazine Top Pick

=== Sin Brothers Series ===
- Forgotten Sins:2014 RT Reviewer's Choice Nomination for Best Paranormal Romantic Suspense, RT Magazine Top Pick
- Sweet Revenge: RT Magazine Top Pick
- Total Surrender: 2015 RT Reviewer's Choice Nomination for Best Paranormal Romantic Suspense, 2016 Daphne Du Maurier Award for Excellence in Mystery/Suspense Nominee for Best Single Title Romantic Mystery/Suspense, RT Magazine Top Pick
- Blind Faith: RT Magazine Top Pick, 2015 PRISM Award Finalist, 2015 Booksellers Best Award Finalist

=== Maverick Montana Series ===
- Under the Covers: 2014 Daphne Du Maurier Award for Excellence in Mystery/Suspense Nominee for Best Romantic Suspense
- Rising Assets: 2015 HOLT Medallion by Virginia Romance Writers Nominee for Extra Spicy/Erotica
