= Kim Harrison =

American author

Dawn Cook
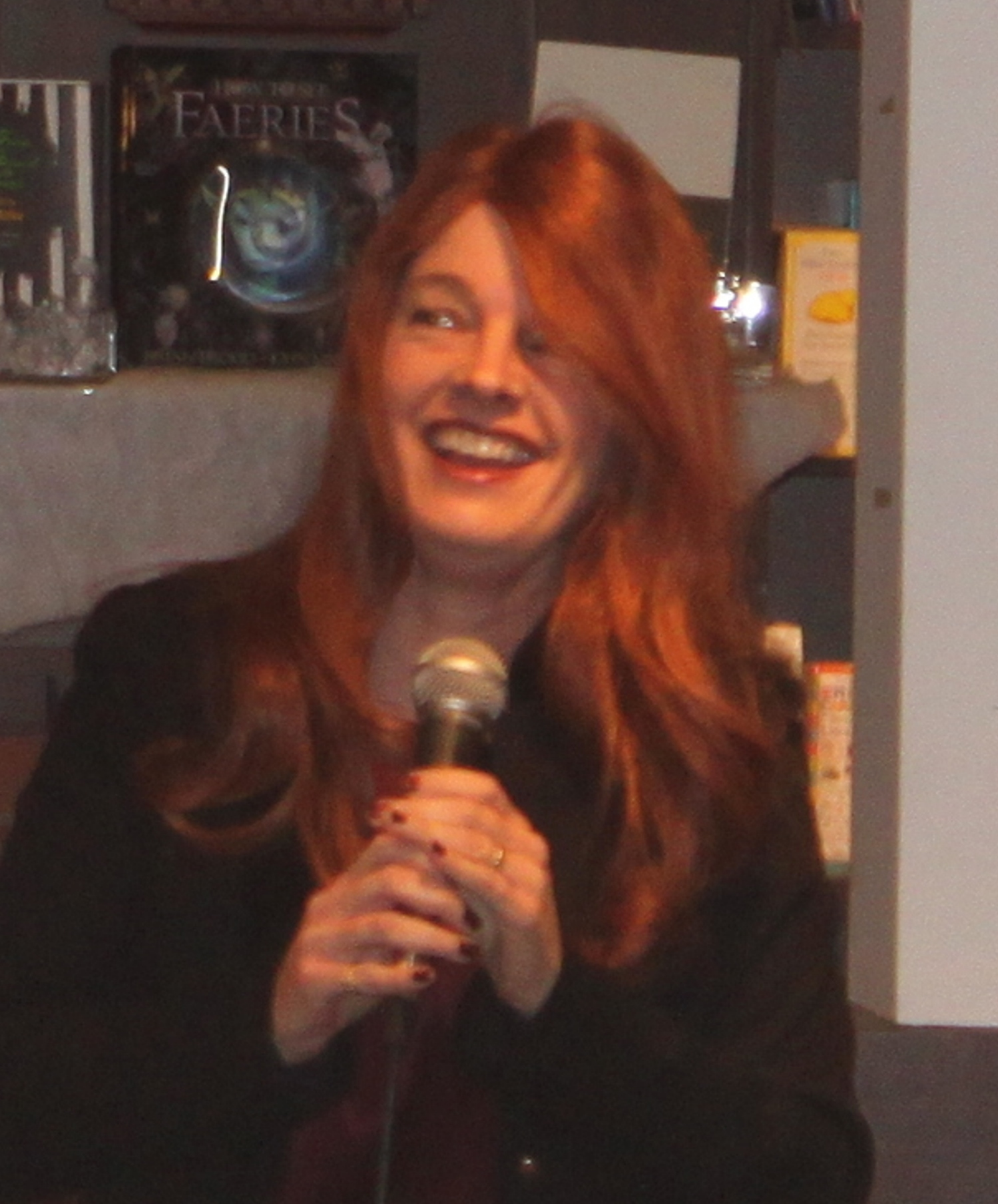
- Harrison at a book-signing event for A Perfect Blood, Ann Arbor, Michigan
- Born: September 30, 1966 (age 60); Midwest
- Occupation: Novelist
- Writing career
- Pen name: Kim Harrison
- Period: 2002 to present
- Genre: Fantasy
- Website: kimharrison.net

Kim Harrison (born September 30, 1966) is a pen name of American author Dawn Cook. Harrison is best known as the author of the New York Times #1 best selling Hollows urban fantasy series, but she has also published over two dozen books spanning the gamut from young adult, accelerated-science thriller, anthology, and a unique, full-color world book, and has scripted two original graphic novels set in the Hollows universe. She has also published traditional fantasy under the name Dawn Cook.

The Rachel Morgan urban fantasy series is set in an alternate history in which a worldwide pandemic caused by genetically modified tomatoes led to the death of a large portion of the world's human population. Under the name of Dawn Cook, she writes the Decoy Princess and Truth series, published in the first few years of the 21st century.

Harrison has received praise from fellow authors, and has reached the #1 spot on the New York Times Best Seller list.

== Early life ==
Kim Harrison was born and raised in the Midwest. A self-proclaimed "former tomboy," she grew up the only girl in a family of boys. Despite her love of writing, she took an unorthodox approach to it, and claims to have avoided English courses beyond the basic requirements in high school and college.

== Career ==
Harrison began her career with writing traditional science fiction, but began writing contemporary fantasy after deciding to focus more on character development. She spent the better part of a decade struggling as an aspiring author before meeting her current agent at a writing convention. He then introduced her to Diana Gill, who became Harrison's editor. Together, they produced Dead Witch Walking, and her first book was published in paperback by HarperTorch in 2004. Since then, she has written twelve more books, two graphic novels, and extensive world book in the Hollows series, also called the Rachel Morgan series, (most with titles punning off Clint Eastwood movies) and contributed to multiple anthologies, with prequels to the Hollows books, and one with a young adult story.

After the success of her first novel, Harrison was able to resign from her day job, devoting herself to writing full-time. Her favorite author is Ray Bradbury. She references music as one of her strongest writing influences, providing song lists for several of her characters. In her spare time, she communicates with fans via her self-maintained website and blog.

Harrison is a member of the International Thriller Writers.

The first two Truth books were originally one book, which was split into two separate books for publishing. That the two are the same, and that Cook was Harrison, was disclosed in a May 2009 Locus magazine article.

I'm glad it's out in the open, because it is hard to maintain these two separate identities, and remind your friends or family when you go out, "I'm Kim today, so don't call me Dawn." The division has served its purpose. I'm still going to be Kim, but now if somebody calls me Dawn I won't have to say "Shut your mouth!"

== Reception ==
Harrison has reached #1 on the New York Times Best Seller list and is generally recognized as one of the most successful and influential creators of urban fantasy. Her writing has garnered praise from numerous peers. Authors Kelly Gay and Courtney Allison Moulton have cited her as an inspiration. The Hollows series has also gained recognition from The New York Times and Amazon.com. In 2007, Amazon.com noted that Harrison had become "one of the hottest authors in the incredibly popular genre of sexy supernaturalism."

== Bibliography as Kim Harrison ==
=== The Hollows universe ===
==== The Turn Novels (Hollows prequel) ====
1. The Turn: The Hollows begins with Death (February 7, 2017, ISBN 978-1501108716)

==== Rachel Morgan / The Hollows Novels ====
1. Dead Witch Walking (April 2004, ISBN 0-06-057296-5)
2. The Good, the Bad, and the Undead (January 2005, ISBN 0-06-057297-3)
3. Every Which Way But Dead (June 28, 2005, ISBN 0-06-057299-X)
4. A Fistful of Charms (June 27, 2006, ISBN 0-06-078819-4)
5. For a Few Demons More (March 20, 2007, ISBN 0-06-078838-0)
6. The Outlaw Demon Wails (Where Demons Dare in the UK) (February 26, 2008, ISBN 978-0-06-078870-4)
7. White Witch, Black Curse (February 24, 2009, ISBN 978-0-06-113801-0)
8. Black Magic Sanction (February 23, 2010, ISBN 0-06-113803-7)
9. Pale Demon (February 22, 2011, ISBN 0-06-113806-1)
10. A Perfect Blood (February 21, 2012, ISBN 0-06-195789-5)
11. Ever After (January 22, 2013, ISBN 0-06-195791-7)
12. The Undead Pool (February 25, 2014, ISBN 978-0-06-195793-2)
13. The Witch with No Name (September 9, 2014, ISBN 9780061957956)
14. American Demon (Jun 16, 2020, ISBN 9780593101414)
15. Million Dollar Demon (June 15, 2021, ISBN 9780593101445)
16. Trouble with the Cursed (June 14, 2022, ISBN 9780593437513)
17. Demons of Good and Evil (June 13, 2023, ISBN 9780593437544)
18. Demon's Bluff (October 22, 2024, ISBN 9780593639986)

==== Graphic novels ====
- Blood Work: An Original Hollows Graphic Novel (July 12, 2011, ISBN 0-345-52101-3)—Illustrated by Pedro Maia and Gemma Magno.
- Blood Crime (October 30, 2012, ISBN 0-345-52102-1)—Illustrated by Gemma Magno.

==== Supplement ====
- The Hollows Insider: New fiction, facts, maps, murders, and more in the world of Rachel Morgan (October 25, 2011, ISBN 0-06-197433-1)

==== Audio books ====
The Turn Novels

1. The Turn: The Hollows begins with Death (February 12, 2018, ISBN 978-1-5082-1160-0)—Simon & Schuster Audio, read by Marguerite Gavin

The Hollows Novels

1. Dead Witch Walking (July 23, 2007, ISBN 978-1-4001-0471-0)—Tantor Media, read by Marguerite Gavin
2. The Good, the Bad, and the Undead (November 29, 2007, ISBN 978-1-4001-3472-4)—Tantor Media, read by Marguerite Gavin
3. Every Which Way But Dead (December 31, 2007, ISBN 978-1-4001-3473-1)—Tantor Media, read by Marguerite Gavin
4. A Fistful of Charms (January 9, 2008,ISBN 978-1-4001-0474-1)—Tantor Media, read by Marguerite Gavin
5. For a Few Demons More (May 28, 2007, ISBN 978-1-4001-3453-3)—Tantor Media, read by Marguerite Gavin
6. The Outlaw Demon Wails (February 26, 2008, ISBN 978-0-0614-5298-7)—HarperAudio, read by Gigi Bermingham
7. White Witch, Black Curse (February 24, 2009, ISBN 978-0-0617-1469-6)—HarperAudio, read by Marguerite Gavin
8. Black Magic Sanction (February 1, 2010, ISBN 978-1-4417-2292-8)—Blackstone Audio, read by Marguerite Gavin
9. Pale Demon (February 22, 2011, ISBN 978-1-4417-7630-3)—Blackstone Audio, read by Marguerite Gavin
10. A Perfect Blood (February 1, 2012, ISBN 978-1-4551-1954-7)—Blackstone Audio, read by Marguerite Gavin
11. Ever After (January 22, 2013, ISBN 978-1-4708-3873-7)—Blackstone Audio, read by Marguerite Gavin
12. The Undead Pool (February 25, 2014, ISBN 978-1-4829-9215-1)—HarperAudio, read by Marguerite Gavin
13. The Witch with No Name (September 9, 2014, ISBN 978-1-4830-2825-5)—HarperAudio, read by Marguerite Gavin

==== Omnibus editions ====
- This Witch For Hire (February 2006, ISBN 0-7394-6380-2)—Science Fiction Book Club Omnibus Edition, includes Dead Witch Walking and The Good, the Bad, and the Undead
- Dead Witches Tell No Tales (July 2006, ISBN 0-7394-7083-3)—Science Fiction Book Club Omnibus Edition, includes Every Which Way But Dead and A Fistful of Charms

==== Collection ====
- Into the Woods: Tales from the Hollows and Beyond (October 9, 2012, ISBN 0-06-197432-3)—Includes all previous Rachel Morgan series short stories, a new related short story from Trent's perspective, and two new short stories unrelated to the series. Also published as audiobook.

==== Novellas and short stories ====
- Undead in the Garden of Good and Evil: A series prequel from the viewpoint of Ivy Tamwood, the origins of her struggle against the vampiric power structure and her partnership with Rachel. Originally published in Dates from Hell (April 1, 2006, ISBN 0-06-085409-X)—anthology with Kelley Armstrong, Lynsay Sands, and Lori Handeland; also included in the short story collection Into the Woods (October 9, 2012, ISBN 978-0-06-197432-8).
- Two Ghosts for Sister Rachel: A novella prequel centered on the character Rachel Morgan in Holidays Are Hell (October 30, 2007, ISBN 978-0-06-123909-0)—anthology with Lynsay Sands, Marjorie M. Liu, and Vicki Pettersson.
- "Dirty Magic": A short story centered around the banshee Mia in the anthology Hotter Than Hell. (June 24, 2008, ISBN 978-0-06-116129-2)—anthology with Lilith Saintcrow, Tanya Huff and others
- "The Bridges of Eden Park": A short story initially included in the paperback edition of For a Few Demons More and again in "Into the Woods," centered on Rachel Morgan's love interest Kisten, and his familial ties to the vampire world.
- "The Bespelled": A short story on the origins of the relationship between Ceri and Algaliarept, included in the paperback edition of The Outlaw Demon Wails and "Into the Woods."
- "Ley Line Drifter": A short story focused on Hollows character Jenks working an independent pixy case with the assistance of Ivy and Bis, published in Unbound (August 25, 2009, ISBN 0-06-169993-4)—anthology with Melissa Marr, Jeaniene Frost, Vicki Pettersson, and Jocelynn Drake; and "Into the Woods."
- "Sudden Backtrack": A short story focused on Algaliarept and Newt, detailing the origins of the elf and demon war; published as an exclusive addition in The Witch With No Name.

=== Madison Avery trilogy ===
==== Novels ====
1. Once Dead, Twice Shy (May 26, 2009, ISBN 978-0-06-171816-8)
2. Early to Death, Early to Rise (May 25, 2010, ISBN 978-0-06-171817-5)
3. Something Deadly This Way Comes (May 24, 2011, ISBN 978-0-06-171819-9)

==== Novellas and short stories ====
- Madison Avery and the Dim Reaper introducing Madison Avery in Prom Nights From Hell. (April 1, 2007, ISBN 0-06-125309-X, ISBN 978-0-06-125309-6) a young adult anthology

=== The Peri Reed Chronicles ===
==== Novels ====
1. The Drafter (September 1, 2015, ISBN 978-1-50-110869-3)
2. The Operator (November 22, 2016, ISBN 978-1-40-870758-6)

==== Novellas and short stories ====
- "Sideswiped" (August 1, 2015)
- "Waylaid", a Peri Reed and Hollows crossover (April 4, 2016)

=== Standalone works ===
==== Novels ====
1. Perfunctory Affection (Perfection) (2019, ISBN 978-1-59606-896-4)
2. Eclipsed Evolution (2024, ISBN 978-0-59-381625-7)—set to release in three audio parts read by Xe Sands throughout 2024 (First Contact, Totality, Emergence) and as one comprehensive audiobook in July 2024

== Bibliography as Dawn Cook ==
=== Truth series ===
The Truth series is about a young woman whose mother tells her she needs to leave home to find a mythical fortress called 'The Hold.' Along the way, she falls into a ravine and is brought out of it by a plainsman. On the way to the Hold, she dreams of her dead father and learns about her true heritage, that she has the ability to use magic, skeptical as she is.

1. First Truth, May 28, 2002, Ace Books, ISBN 0-441-00945-X
2. Hidden Truth, November 26, 2002, Ace Books, ISBN 0-441-01003-2
3. Forgotten Truth, November 25, 2003, Ace Books, ISBN 0-441-01117-9
4. Lost Truth, November 30, 2004, Ace Books, ISBN 0-441-01228-0

=== Decoy Princess series ===
1. The Decoy Princess, November 29, 2005, Ace Books, ISBN 0-441-01355-4
2. Princess at Sea, July 25, 2006, Ace Books, ISBN 0-441-01424-0

=== Short story ===
With Friends Like These

A story about a vampire and his roommate, in The Mammoth Book of Vampire Romance 2 (September 22, 2009, ISBN 978-0-7624-3796-2)—anthology with Jordan Summers, Deborah Cooke, Karen MacInerney, Caitlin Kittredge, Dina James, Camille Bacon-Smith, Rosemary Laurey, Patti O'Shea, Angie Fox, Caitlín R. Kiernan, Jamie Leigh Hansen, Carole Nelson Douglas, Diane Whiteside, Jaye Wells, Stacia Kane, Jennifer Ashley, Justine Musk, Jennifer St. Giles, Nancy Holder, Larissa Ione, Jeanne C. Stein, Tiffany Trent, Ann Aguirre, and Devon Monk.

== See also ==
- Agaliarept
