= Flora Speer =

American writer

Flora Speer is an author of stories ranging from historical romances, to time-travel, to futuristic tales.

== Biography ==
Flora Speer was born in southern New Jersey, on September 4, 1933, and died on October 15, 2024, in Connecticut. where she lived for many years.

== Bibliography ==
- By Honor Bound (1988)
- Venus Rising (1989)
- Much Ado About Love (1989)
- Castle of Dreams (1990)
- Destiny's Lovers (1990)
- Castle of the Heart (1990)
- Time and Time Again (1991)
- Viking Passion (1992)
- A Time to Love Again (1993)
- No Other Love (1993)
- A Love Beyond Time (1994)
- Christmas Carol (1994)
- Love Just in Time (1995)
- For Love and Honor (1995)
- Lady Lure (1996)
- Rose Red (1996)
- Heart's Magic (1997)
- The Magician's Lover (1998)
- Love Once and Forever (1999)
- Timestruck (2000)
- A Passionate Magic (2001)
- A Time-Travel Christmas (compilation)
