= Leland Kleinsasser =

American politician (1934–2025)

Member of the South Dakota Senate from the 23rd district
- In office 1981–1988

Member of the South Dakota House of Representatives from the 11th district
- In office 1979–1980

Personal details
- Born: November 12, 1934 Yale, South Dakota, U.S.
- Died: August 4, 2025 (aged 90) Huron, South Dakota, U.S.
- Party: Republican
- Spouse: Sharon Kay Toews
- Children: 1
- Profession: Farmer

Leland Paul Kleinsasser (November 12, 1934 – August 4, 2025) was an American politician. He served in the South Dakota House of Representatives from 1979 to 1980 and in the South Dakota Senate from 1981 to 1988.

Kleinsasser died on August 4, 2025, at the age of 90.
