= Hollows (series) =

Novel series by Kim Harrison

- Original cover of Dead Witch Walking by artist Jean Pierre Targete
- Dead Witch Walking (2004); The Good, The Bad, and The Undead (2005); Every Which Way But Dead (2005); A Fistful of Charms (2006); For A Few Demons More (2007); The Outlaw Demon Wails (Where Demons Dare in the UK) (2008); White Witch, Black Curse (2009); Black Magic Sanction (2010); Pale Demon (2011); A Perfect Blood (2012); Ever After (2013); The Undead Pool (2014); The Witch With No Name (2014); American Demon (2020); Million Dollar Demon (2021); Trouble with the Cursed (2022); Demons of Good and Evil (2023); Demon's Bluff (2024)
- Author: Kim Harrison
- Country: United States
- Genre: Urban fantasy
- Publisher: HarperCollins (1–13); Ace (14– )
- Published: 2004–present
- No. of books: 18
- Website: The Hollows on kimharrison.com

The Hollows (sometimes called the Rachel Morgan series) is a series of urban fantasy novels by Kim Harrison, originally published by HarperCollins Publishers and by Ace Books since 2020. The series includes 18 novels, numerous novellas and short stories, two graphic novels, and one compendium resource; a 19th novel, Absolute Demon, is forthcoming in 2027.

The series is told in the first-person point of view of Rachel Morgan, a bounty hunter and witch who works with local law enforcement agencies, facing both mundane and supernatural threats. The story is set in an alternate history universe, primarily in Cincinnati and Northern Kentucky. In Rachel's world, supernatural beings—primarily witches, vampires, and werewolves—began existing openly with the human population in the 1960s, after the accidental release of a genetically modified tomato killed a significant portion of the human population. The series is set approximately 40 years after this event, known as "the Turn".

== Plot synopsis ==
At the beginning of the series, Rachel works at the vampire-run federal Inderland Security service, a law enforcement agency, along with Ivy Tamwood, a so-called living vampire who is infected with the vampire virus but retains her soul, and Jenks, a pixy. In book one, Dead Witch Walking, they leave the service, founding a freelance runner and security business together. The three live and work in a deconsecrated church with attached garden and graveyard in the Hollows (Covington, Kentucky) across the river from Cincinnati.

Rachel initially practices only simple herb-based earth magic; as the series progress, she is forced to master progressively more difficult ley line and demon magic.

In the second book, The Good, the Bad, and the Undead, Rachel learns that her antagonist, Trent—a billionaire businessman and politician who engages in drug-running and illegal genetic research activities—is secretly an elf, a species thought to have become extinct during the Turn.

Rachel is the sole female survivor of the Rosewood Syndrome, a genetic blood disorder affecting witch children. Eventually, it is revealed that witches are demons whose magical potential was reduced by an ancient curse; Rosewood Syndrome occurs when witch children are born with the full power of their demon magic. Trent's father is responsible for curing Rachel; because of this, she and Trent share a childhood history that neither remembers due to memory blockers.

Later in the series, Rachel and Trent become romantically involved, eventually forming an extended family unit with his daughter, Ivy and her partner, and Jenks.

== Setting ==
The series is set in an alternate history universe. In the 1960s, a virus attached itself to a flaw in the genome of a genetically modified tomato, quickly spreading around the world and killing a quarter of the human population. Realizing that their number now neared that of humans, supernatural beings, who become known as "Inderlanders", seized the opportunity to begin living in the open.

As a result of the plague, all bioengineering research is outlawed, and humans developed a cultural fear of tomatoes and tomato-based food products such as pizza sauce and tomato ketchup, which Inderlanders continue to consume.

The dramatic change in the make up of the population led to the break down of law enforcement in the United States. Two new organizations, the Inderlander Security service (consisting of non-humans) and the Federal Inderlander Bureau (consisting of humans), replaced the former law enforcement agencies at all levels. The structure of society otherwise remained intact during the Turn because Inderlanders obtained (or seized) many positions of power.

=== The Ever-after ===
The Ever-after is a magical plane existing in parallel to the in-universe reality. Concentrations of Ever-after energy are accessible on Earth as ley lines, which can be tapped for spell work and travel between planes. Demons are the only race living in the Ever-after, having driven out the elves nearly two thousand years ago. Witches formerly dwelt in the Ever-after, but fled approximately five thousand years ago.

The Ever-after was a beautiful land until it was destroyed by the imbalance of the Elf-Demon war. Rachel learns in book 11, Ever After, that the war was caused by a break in the alliance between elves and demons. The elves enslaved the demons, and the demons, in return, tried to trap the Elves in the Ever-after. The conflict resolved when the elves migrated to human reality.

== Publication History ==
According to Harrison, Dead Witch Walking originated as a short story in 1999; in an attempt to write something "odd", she threw together three oddball characters: "A witch, a pixy, and a vampire in a bar sounded good to me." When urban fantasy from Charlaine Harris, Jim Butcher, and Laurell K. Hamilton became increasingly popular, she expanded the story into a novel-length manuscript, which was acquired by HarperCollins as the first in a trilogy.

The series had been planned to conclude after the 13th entry, 2014's The Witch With No Name. However, Harrison continued the series in 2020 with American Demon, which was the first Hollows book published by Ace. A prequel novel, The Turn, was released in 2017 by Gallery Books.

Dead Witch Walking was rereleased by HarperCollins in 2024 as a trade paperback with new cover art by artist Julie Dillon.

=== Novels ===
1. Dead Witch Walking, April 2004, ISBN 978-0060572969
2. The Good, The Bad, and The Undead, January 2005, ISBN 978-0061567315
3. Every Which Way But Dead, July 2005, ISBN 978-0060572990
4. A Fistful of Charms, July 2006, ISBN 978-0-06-078819-3
5. For A Few Demons More, March 2007, ISBN 978-0-06-078838-4
6. The Outlaw Demon Wails (retitled Where Demons Dare in the UK), March 2008, ISBN 978-0-06-078870-4
7. White Witch, Black Curse, March 2009, ISBN 978-0-06-113801-0
8. Black Magic Sanction, March 2010, ISBN 978-0-06-113803-4
9. Pale Demon, March 2011, ISBN 978-0-06-113806-5
10. A Perfect Blood, February 2012, ISBN 978-0-06-195789-5
11. Ever After, January 2013, ISBN 978-0-06-195791-8
12. The Undead Pool, February 2014, ISBN 978-0-06-195793-2
13. The Witch With No Name, September 2014, ISBN 978-0061957956
14. American Demon, June 2020, ISBN 978-0593101414
15. Million Dollar Demon, June 2021, ISBN 978-0593101445
16. Trouble with the Cursed, June 2022, ISBN 978-0-593-43751-3
17. Demons of Good and Evil, June 2023, ISBN 978-0-593-43754-4
18. Demon's Bluff, October 2024, ISBN 978-0-593-63998-6
19. Absolute Demon, forthcoming, February 2027, ISBN 978-0593640036

=== Novellas and short stories ===
No.	Title	First Published	First appeared in	ISBN
0.4	Undead in the Garden of Good and Evil	April 1st, 2006	Dates From Hell	978-0060854096
Novella from Ivy's perspective; Ivy rebuffs Art and when she and Rachel begin working together.
0.3	Two Ghosts For Sister Rachel	October 30, 2007	Holidays Are Hell	978-0061239090
How Rachel and Pierce met.
4.1	"The Bridges of Eden Park"	November 27, 2007	For a Few Demons More (US mass market edition)	978-0061149818
a Kisten and Rachel short story
0.2	"The Bespelled"	November 25, 2008	The Outlaw Demon Wails (US mass market edition)	978-0061149825
How Al, the demon, captured Ceri in the ever-after; told from his perspective.
6.1	Dirty Magic	October 6, 2009	Hotter Than Hell	978-0061983344
Short story from Mia's PoV
7.1	Ley Line Drifter	January 1, 2009	Unbound	978-0061699931
Jenks and Bis's adventure with a dryad, a nymph and a pixie family in need; told from Jenks's perspective.
0.5	Blood Work: An Original Hollows Graphic Novel	July 12, 2011	-	978-0-345-52101-9
Rachel's internship under Ivy at the Inderlander Security, told from Ivy's perspective.
9.1	Million-Dollar Baby	October 9, 2012	Into the Woods	978-0061974328
Jenks and Trent rescue Trent's daughter; told from Trent's perspective.
0.6	Blood Crime	October 30, 2012	-	978-0-345-52102-6
Rachel continues her internship under Ivy; told from Ivy's perspective.
10.1	"Trouble on Reserve"	October 29, 2013	Ever After	978-0061957925
0.1	Sudden Backtrack	October 28, 2014	-	978-0062391582
Recounts the origin of the Elf-Demon wars, and how and why Newt and Al cursed the elven race thousands of years ago
—	"Waylaid"	April 4, 2016	-	978-1501145551
crossover with Peri Reed
	"Dog-eared"	April 14, 2026	Paranormal Payback	978-0593816080
Al seeks to punish a wizard for misusing his magical texts.

=== Additional works ===
- Into the Woods, October 9, 2012, ISBN 978-0061974328
  - An anthology of short stories and novellas in and outside of the Hollows world.
- The Hollows Insider, October 22, 2013, ISBN 978-0062323385
  - An illustrated compendium of supplementary materials.
- The Turn, February 7, 2017, Gallery Books, ISBN 978-1501108716
  - A prequel novel featuring Trent's parents at the time of the Turn.

== Reception ==
The series has frequently appeared on The New York Times Best Seller List. The 12th volume, The Undead Pool, debuted at #1 the week of March 16, 2014.

The Magazine of Fantasy & Science Fiction called the first book, Dead Witch Walking, "fast-paced and loads of fun".

The Outlaw Demon Wails (book six), Black Magic Sanction (book eight), Pale Demon (book nine), and A Perfect Blood (book ten) were all reviewed in various US newspapers at the time of release.

Harrison's return to the Hollows universe in 2020 was well received. Lee Mandelo, writing for Reactor, didn't recommend American Demon as a starting point for new readers, yet found it a welcome return to Rachel's world, calling her "a thoughtful, silly, fun protagonist". Publishers Weekly also observed that an introductory preface wasn't enough of a bridge for new readers, but called the story "enjoyable".
