= Cait London =

American writer

Lois Kleinsasser
- Born: April 11, 1954 (age 72); Washington, U.S.
- Occupation: Novelist
- Writing career
- Pen name: Cait Logan, Cait London
- Period: 1980–present
- Genre: Romance
- Website: www.caitlondon.com

Lois Kleinsasser (born April 11, 1954, in Washington, U.S.) is USA Today's bestselling American writer of over 45 romance novels since 1980 as Cait London. She also signed her novels as Cait Logan.

== Biography ==
Lois Kleinsasser, of German-Russian ancestry, was born on April 11 in the state of Washington. She moved to the Midwest, California, and finally settled in Kentucky, where she currently is a single mother of three daughters.

Lois is a USA Today bestselling writer, a member of national professional novelist organizations, and presents seminars on writing and speaking on other topics.

== Bibliography ==
=== As Cait Logan ===
==== Single novels ====
- Lady on the Line (1986)
- Rugged Glory (1986)
- Tame the Fury (1990)
- Wild Dawn (1992)
- Gambler's Lady (1992)
- Night Fire (1994)
- Delilah (1995)
- The Wedding Gamble (1996)
- Be Mine (1997)

==== A Lady's series ====
1. A Lady's Choice (1988)
2. A Lady's Desire (1988)

==== Omnibus in collaboration ====
- Outlaw Love (1997) (with Connie Brockway, Brenda Joyce and Stephanie Mittman)

=== As Cait London ===
==== MacLean series ====
1. The Loving Season (1989)
2. Angel Versus Maclean (1990)
3. The Daddy Candidate (1991)

==== Single novels ====
- The Pendragon Virus (1990)
- The Cowboy (1993)
- Maybe No, Maybe Yes (1993)
- Fusion (1994)
- The Bride Says No (1994)
- Mr. Easy (1995)
- Miracles and Mistletoe (1995)
- Three Kisses (1998)
- Sleepless in Montana (1999)
- It Happened at Midnight (2000)
- Leaving Lonely Town (2001)
- A Loving Man (2001)
- When Night Falls (2002)
- With Her Last Breath (2003)
- What Memories Remain (2004)
- Flashback (2005)
- Hidden Secrets (2005)
- Total Package (2005)
- Silence the Whispers (2006)
- At the Edge (2007)
- A Stranger's Touch (2008)

==== Blaylocks series ====
1. Midnight Rider (1992)
2. The Seduction of Jake Tallman (1993)
3. Blaylock's Bride (1999)
4. Rio, Man of Destiny (1999)
5. Typical Male (1999)

==== Every Guide To... series ====
1. Every Girl's Guide To... (1995)
2. Every Groom's Guide To... (1996)

==== Tallchiefs series ====
1. The Cowboy and the Cradle (1996)
2. Tallchief's Bride (1996)
3. Tallchief for Keeps (1997)
4. The Groom Candidate (1997)
5. The Seduction of Fiona Tallchief (1998)
6. Rafe Palladin: Man of Secrets (1998)
7. The Perfect Fit (1998)
8. Tallchief, the Homecoming (2000)
9. Tallchief: The Hunter (2002)
- A Tallchief Celebration (omnibus) (2001)

==== Freedom Valley series ====
1. Last Dance (2000)
2. Slow Fever (2000)
3. Gabriel's Gift (2001)

==== Stepanov Heartbreakers series ====
1. Mr. Temptation (2002)
2. Instinctive Male (2003)
3. Hold Me Tight (2004)

==== Fresh Start Series ====
1. Just You (2018)
2. Just Love (2018)
3. Just Us (2023)

==== The Basket Series ====
1. The Basket Maker’s Wife (2013)
2. The Egg Basket (2016)
3. The Bride’s Basket (2016)
4. The Rose Basket (2017)

==== Collections ====
- Luke's Promise / Tallchief, the Hunter (2002)

==== Omnibus in collaboration ====
- Spring Fancy (1994) (with Pepper Adams and Dixie Browning)
- Spring Fever (1997) (with Pepper Adams and Dixie Browning)
- Mistletoe Kisses (1998) (with Andrea Edwards and Rachel Lee)
- Maternity Leave (1998) (with Candace Camp and Sherryl Woods)
- Do You Take This Cowboy (2000) (with Anne McAllister)
- First Love, Only Love (2001) (with B.J. James)
- Forbidden Attraction (2002) (with Laurie Paige)
- Her Ideal Man (2002) (with Fayrene Preston)
- Mr.Temptation / Plain Jane's Texan (2003) (with Jan Hudson)
- The Millionaire's Proposal / Plain Jane's Texan (2003) (with Susan Mallery)
- Stuck on You (2004) (with Wendy Rosnau and Carolyn Zane)
- Lionhearted / Instinctive Male (2004) (with Diana Palmer)
- Nine-month Knight / Paternity Test / Tabloid Baby (2004) (with Candace Camp and Sherryl Woods)
- Lassoed Hearts (2004) (with Susan Mallery)
- Hold Me Tight / Cowboy Crescendo (2004) (with Cathleen Galitz)
- Breathless Passion / Total Package (2006) (with Emilie Rose)
- Sugarplums and Scandal (2006) (with Lori Avocato, Dana Cameron, Mary Daheim, Suzanne Macpherson and Kerrelyn Sparks) (All I Want for Christmas is My Two Front Teeth / Lords of Misrule / Ghost of Christmas Passed / Partners in Crime / Holly Go Lightly / Very Vampy Christmas)

== References and sources ==
- Cait London's Official Website
- Harlequin Enterprises Ltd
