= Kim Falconer =

Australian writer

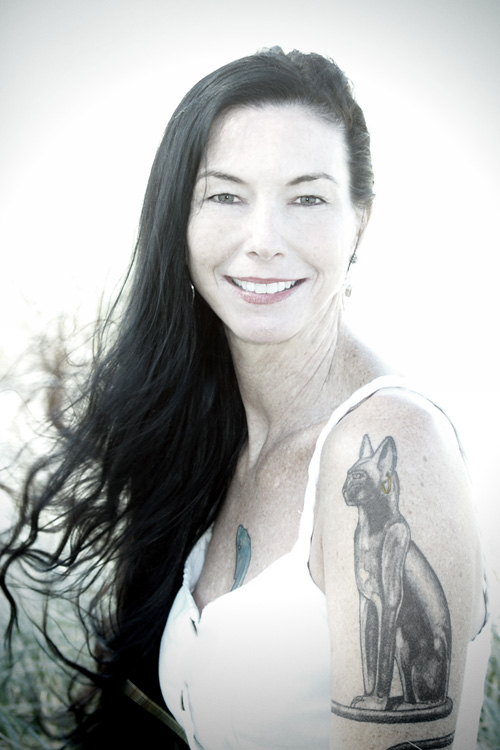
- Kim Falconer
- Born: 1954 (age 71–72); Santa Cruz, California, USA
- Occupation: Novelist

Kim Falconer (born 1954 in Santa Cruz, California) is an Australian author of YA and adult Speculative Fiction, living in New South Wales.

Falconer grew up on the once family-owned Wilder Ranch, and emigrated to Australia in 1981. Active as a professional writer of fantasy since 2009, her two series with Harpercollins Australia are Quantum Enchantment and Quantum Encryption. Her latest urban fantasy was published by Harlequin Books Australia. Falconer has written a new, three book YA series under the pen name of A. K. Wilder - coming out 5 January 2021 with Entangled Teen in the USA.

Falconer trains in Iaido, the Japanese sword, to better choreograph her fight scenes. She claims that each of her stories begins with a grain of truth. Falconer is also an astrologer, running GoodVibeAstrology.com and has completed a Master of Arts degree in writing from Swinburne University of Technology, Melbourne Australia in 2014. She was awarded the 2014 Top Graduate Prize for highest achieving graduate in the Master of Arts (Writing), the 2014 Top Student in a Unit Prize for PWR70003 Script Adaptation: Stage, Screen and Multimedia, and the 2014 Top Student in a Unit Prize for PWR80001 Critical and Creative Practices: The Writerly Identity. She writes young adult fiction under the pen name A. K. Wilder.

== Family ==
Her son, Aaron Briggs has done the cover art for her Quantum Encryption series.

== Works ==
Novels

The Bone Throwers - Kim Falconer writing YA Fantasy as A. K. Wilder

- Crown of Bones (January 5, 2021)
- Curse of Shadows (December, 6, 2022)
- Book Three (TBA)

Ava Sykes Novels

- The Blood in the Beginning (July 2016)

Quantum Encryption Series

- Path of the Stray (August 2010)
- Road to the Soul (March 2011)
- Journey by Night (September 2011)
- Tatsania's Gift (September 2012)

Quantum Enchantment Series

- The Spell of Rosette (January 2009)
- Arrows of Time (August 2009)
- Strange Attractors (February 2010)

Anthologies

- Blood and Water in Vampires Gone Wild-Supernatural Underground (January 2014)

Astrology text

- Astrology & Aptitude (2nd ed, 2005)

Short stories

- Wolf Being (2010)
