= Roggenburg =

Roggenburg may refer to:

- Roggenburg, Bavaria, Germany
  - Roggenburg Abbey, in Roggenburg, Bavaria
- Roggenburg, Basel-Country, a municipality in the district of Laufen in the canton of Basel-Country in Switzerland.
- Roggenburg, Schwyz, an island in Lake Lauerz in the canton of Schwyz in Switzerland
