= Weißenhorn =

- Town
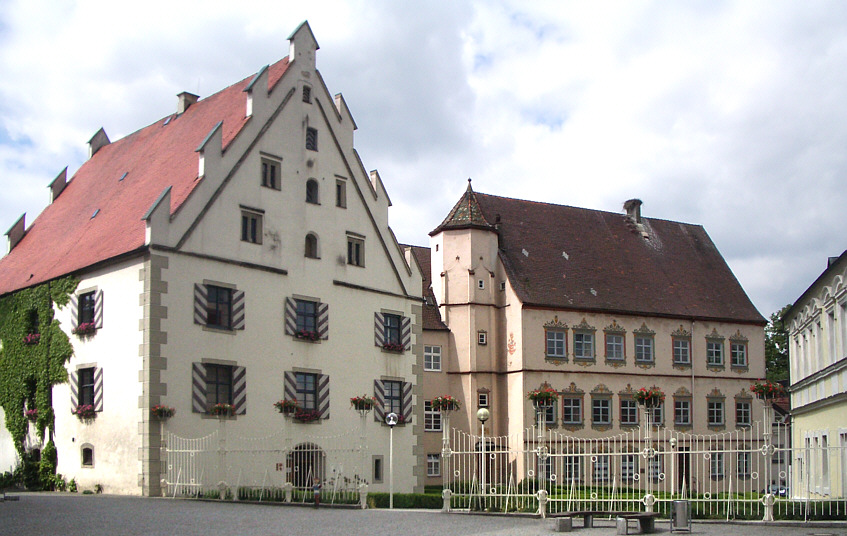
- Neuffen- and Fugger châteaux

- Coat of arms

- Location of Weißenhorn within Neu-Ulm district
- Interactive map of Weißenhorn
- Location within Germany Location within Bavaria
- Coordinates: 48°18′N 10°10′E
- Country: Germany
- State: Bavaria
- Admin. region: Schwaben
- District: Neu-Ulm
- Subdivisions: 10 Stadtteile

Government
  - Mayor (2020–26): Wolfgang Fendt (Ind.)

Area
  - Total: 53.72 km^{2} (20.74 sq mi)
- Elevation: 501 m (1,644 ft)

Population (2025-12-31)
  - Total: 14,238
  - Density: 265.0/km^{2} (686.5/sq mi)
- Time zone: UTC+01:00 (CET)
  - Summer (DST): UTC+02:00 (CEST)
- Postal codes: 89264
- Dialling codes: 07309, 07306 (Emershofen)
- Vehicle registration: NU an ILL
- Website: www.weissenhorn.de

Weißenhorn (German pronunciation: [ˈvaɪsn̩ˌhɔʁn]) is a town in the district of Neu-Ulm in Bavaria. Weißenhorn is located about 22 km southeast of Ulm.

== History ==
Archaeologic finds prove that the area of Weißenhorn was once a settlement of the Alamanni. Also Roman artifacts and artifacts from the Stone Age have been found.

Weißenhorn was first mentioned in 1160 as villa Wizzenhorn. Starting from the thirteenth century Weißenhorn was seat of a line from the aristocratic house of the Neuffen. When it expired in 1342, Weißenhorn came into possession of the dukes of Bavaria, which had pawned Weißenhorn during the most time. 1473 Louis IX of Bavaria held court in Weißenhorn. During the Landshut War of Succession Weißenhorn came into possession of Holy Roman Emperor Maximilian I and became a provincial city of Further Austria. Maximilian transferred the possession to Jacob Fugger in 1507, due to Weißenhorns delivered and reconfirmed privileges the sovereignty rights however remained with Austria. The Fugger family, which held rule over centuries, promoted the local fustian weaving mill and made Weißenhorn into a flourishing commercial town. Besides Augsburg Weißenhorn is the only town which is officially allowed to carry the title of "Fuggerstadt" (Fugger town).

In the German Peasants' War the town was attacked at 1 April 1525 by 12,000 farmers, led by their Captain Jörg von Ingstetten ("Bauern-Jörgl"), which spared the town after successful defense of the citizen and attacked the neighbouring Roggenburg Abbey.

The known bandit and murderer Matthias Klostermayr alias "The Bavarian Hiasl", who was up to mischief in the 18th century, was nearly imprisoned by the police of Roggenburg.

After the Peace of Pressburg in 1805 Weißenhorn was mediatised back to Bavaria.

The gothic and later in the baroque style expanded church collapsed during the Wednesday liturgy on 22 February 1859, which resulted in eleven deaths. The cause for that was a too heavy basin for holy water, which was mounted on one of the main pillars. The discussion about the building of a new church lasted until 1872. On recommendation of Ludwig II of Bavaria the head of the municipal planning and building control office of Munich, Knight August von Voith, became the task to plan the building. The parish church, sacred to the Assumption of Mary, was built in the Romanesque Revival architecture style. The city wall has been broken off for this.

1862 the district court of Roggenburg and the police of Illertissen were moved to Weißenhorn in order to the establishment of the Bezirksamt (district office) of Illertissen, which improved the central position of the city in the Roth valley. With the opening of the secondary train line through Senden in 1880 an active structural and economic development began.

Weißenhorn was - except for two airstrikes at the Wehrmacht's gasoline depot in the Eschach forest - mostly spared from the Second World War. It escaped the destruction through the U.S. Army by a non-official capitulation, which was shown by a white banner at the church tower. Therefore, the historic city is mostly preserved.

== Religions ==
- Roman Catholics: 64.7%
- Protestants: 13.4%
- Other (Islamic, New Apostolic and others): 21.9%

== Politics ==
=== Mayor and city council ===
Dr. Wolfgang Fendt (independent) is the town's mayor since 2006. He is supported by the parties SPD and WüW. On 17 June 2012, he was reelected receiving 97,8% of the popular vote.

In the March 2014 city council elections, the CSU got 38,2% of the votes. The following parties are present in the town council (24 seats) after the 2014 local elections:

- CSU (Christian-Social Union in Bavaria): 9 seats
- SPD (Social-Democratic Party of Germany): 6 seats
- WüW (Weißenhorn Independent Electors): 5 seats
- Bündnis 90/Die Grünen (Alliance 90/The Greens): 2 seats
- ÖDP (Ecological Democratic Party): 2 seats

=== Partnerships between cities ===
- since 2010: Villecresnes ( France)
- since 2017: Valmadrera ( Italy)

Besides this official partnership Weißenhorn is in close contact with the municipality of Prad am Stilfser Joch in South Tyrol (Italy).

The local Nikolaus-Kopernikus-Gymnasium in Weissenhorn participates in several student exchange programs. The German American Partnership Program with Denton High School in Denton, Texas began in 2006. Apart from that, exchange programs with students from Bangalore (India), Lyon (France) and Ecuador are regularly organized by the school.

== Economy and infrastructure ==
=== Traffic and location ===
Train service between Weißenhorn and Senden (9.6 km) started on 15 September 1878. The line connected Weißenhorn to the more important Ulm – Memmingen route. Due to the rise in individual transport, the train service to Weißenhorn was discontinued in 1966. But in December 2013, the old route was reactivated. Today an hourly 25-minute train service connects Weißenhorn to the city of Ulm via Senden. From Ulm one can reach all major German and European cities since its railway station is part of the German high-speed railway network.

A local bus network connects Weißenhorn to the surrounding villages.

The city has an exit (123) at the Bundesautobahn 7. Weißenhorn is conveniently located between the two regional capitals Munich (Bavaria) and Stuttgart (Baden-Württemberg). Munich can be reached in 90 minutes by car (150 km).

=== Employers and companies ===
Today's biggest employer is the company PERI GmbH (world market leader in Formwork and Scaffolding), which was founded in Weißenhorn in 1969.

Apart from the aluminium company "Oettinger", there are several medium-size and small companies. A large number of employees commute to the nearby city of Ulm.

=== Education ===
- 2 elementary schools
- Willhelm-Busch-Schule, a school for children with special needs
- Hauptschule Weißenhorn, a secondary school from year 5 to 9
- Realschule Weißenhorn, a secondary school from year 5 to 10
- Nikolaus-Kopernikus-Gymnasium, a secondary school from year 5 to 12
- Montessori School (private)
- public music school
- public library
- museum of local history

== Subdivisions ==
Not all of the 13.599 inhabitants live in the main town of Weißenhorn. Several smaller villages are also part of the municipality of Weißenhorn.

Subdivision	Number of inhabitants
Attenhofen	936
Biberachzell with Asch	707
Bubenhausen	694
Emershofen	157
Grafertshofen	471
Hegelhofen	417
Oberhausen	389
Ober- and Unterreichenbach	335
Wallenhausen	521
Weißenhorn (main city)	8.972

== Culture and sightseeing objects ==
=== Theatre ===
- Historic town theatre, built in 1876 through the change of a tenth barn from the 16th century. It was reconditioned in 1922 and again in 1979 and is one of the few good kept smallurban citizen-theatres from the 19th century. With only 150 seats it is the smallest in historical condition kept theatre in Bavaria and is used by groups of laymen and by the south-German chamber opera.

=== Museums ===
- Weißenhorner Heimatmuseum, (Local history museum) Collection for the town- and region history, founded 1908, 1992-1996 new conceived
- Archaeologic Museum, pre- and early-historical collection

=== Buildings ===
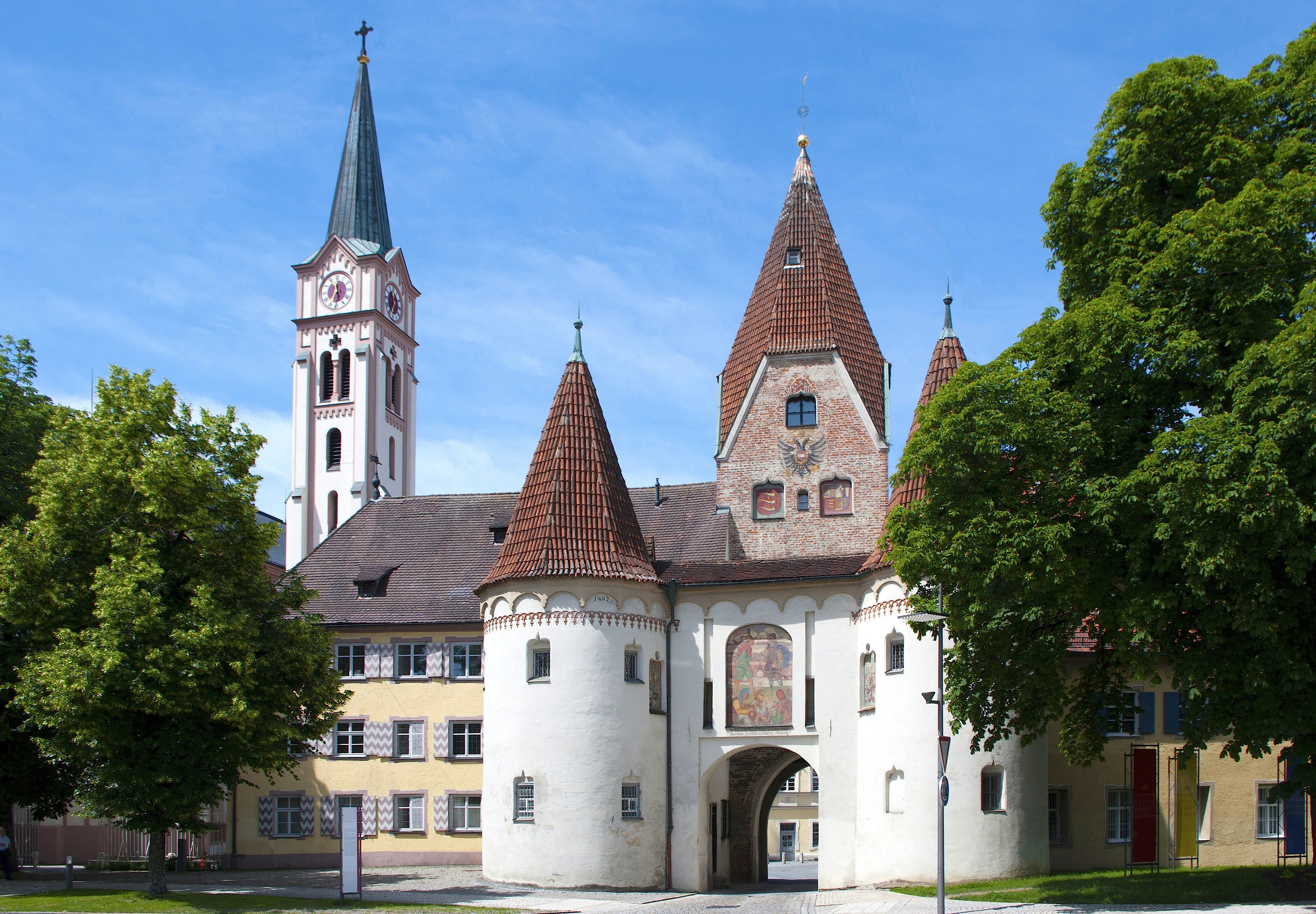
Upper Gate, old town hall and the catholic church seen from the main plaza

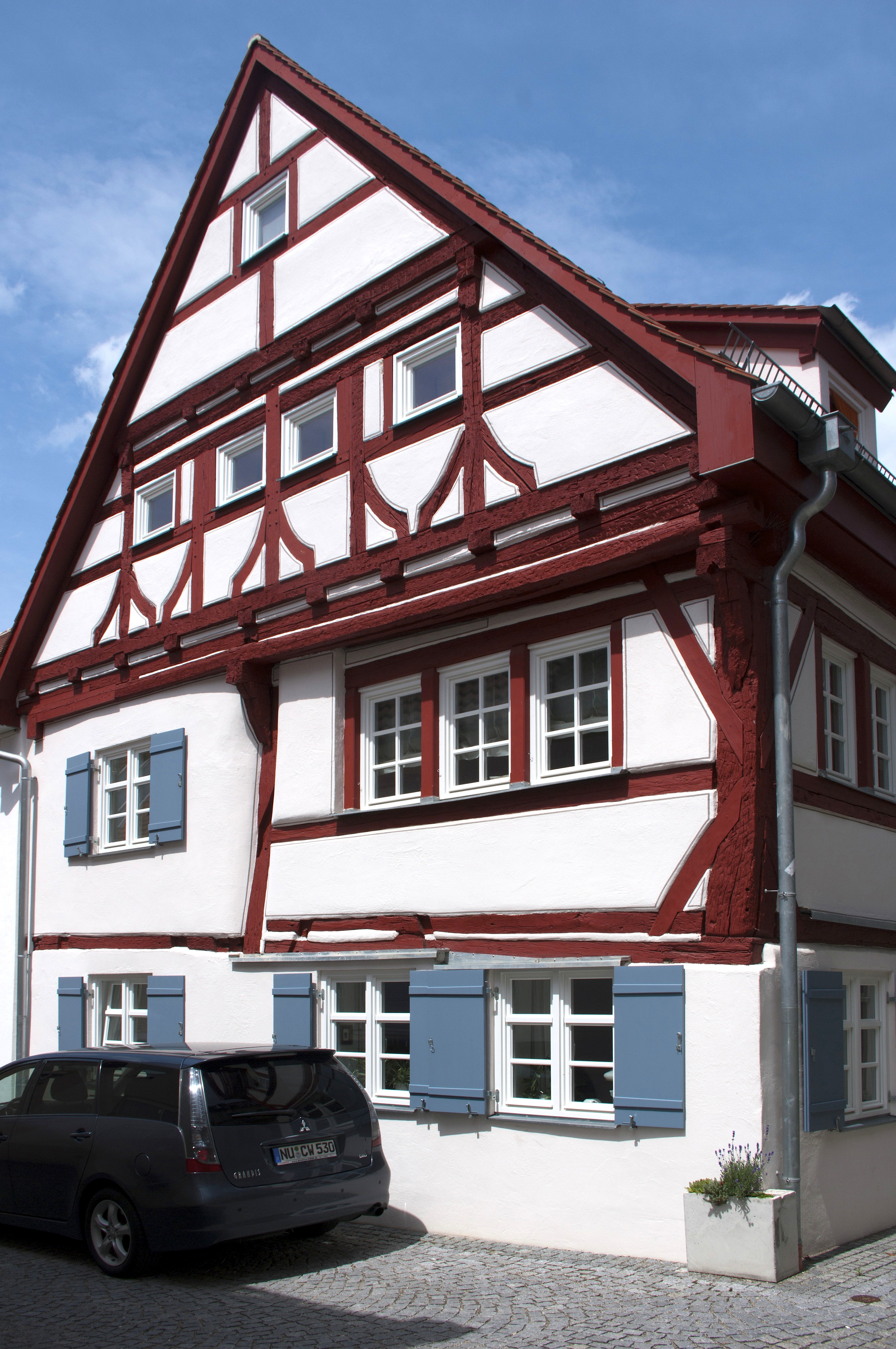
Building in the historic centre

The old part of Weißenhorn is mostly kept in historical condition. Medieval citizen houses, some in framework construction, stately pubs and buildings from the 19th century show the tradition of a commercial town. The medieval wall was cleared away until 1837, the Oberes Tor (Upper Gate), the Unteres Tor (Lower Gate) and the Prügelturm (Flogging tower) were however kept.

- The church place is framed by many sightseeing objects:
  - Upper Gate with two round towers, built around 1470
  - City hall, built 1761
  - Neuffen Château (Old Château), built 1460
  - Fugger Château (New Château), built 1513
  - Fugger Brewing House, built 1565
  - City Parish Church Mariä Himmelfahrt, built around 1872 in the style of the neoromantic form
- Other worth seeing buildings are:
  - Schranne (Old City Hall), built around 1390, extended 1584
  - Heilig-Geist-Church, built around 1470
  - Lower Gate, built around 1470

=== Regular events ===
- Leonhardi-Ride on 6 November, rider pro assignment in honours of the holy Leonhard of Limoges
- Parish party of the Catholic church community in June
- Protestantic Community party at the last Sunday before the summer holidays
- Carnival-Tuesday-Parade at Tuesday after Rose Monday

== Personalities ==
- Nikolaus Thoman (* around 1457, † around 1545), kaplan and chronicle (Weißenhorn History)
- Sebastian Sailer (1714–1777), premonstratensian choir Leader, prayer and swabian dialect poet
- Franz Martin Kuen (1719–1771), painter
- Konrad Huber (1752–1831), painter
- Anton von Henle (1902–1927), bishop of Passau and Regensburg
- Jakob Streitle (1916–1982), football player
- Wilfried Hiller (1941– ), composer

== Literature ==
- Joseph Holl: Geschichte der Stadt Weißenhorn. Kempten 1904. Reproduction: Konrad, Weißenhorn 1983
- Hans Burkhardt: Geschichte der Stadt Weissenhorn und ihrer Stadtteile. Weißenhorn 1988.
- Wolfgang Ott, Monika Kolb: Weissenhorn 1945 bis 1965, Die Reihe Archivbilder Erfurt 2006, Sutton Verlad GmbH
