= Berne Abbey =

Dutch monastery

Coordinates: 51°39′18″N 5°28′21″E

Berne Abbey, a Dutch abbey of the Premonstratensians, or Norbertines, in Heeswijk, North Brabant, is a religious community in the Netherlands. It has 27 brothers and priests (2007; down from 33 in 2005).

The community publishes a bi-monthly magazine called Berne. Since March 2007, Ward Cortvriendt has been the 70th abbot. In 2009 the abbey celebrated its 875th anniversary. Besides the professed members the abbey also has some people who feel closely connected with the community: participants of the group Ruach, the community of Berne and the Bernecircle.

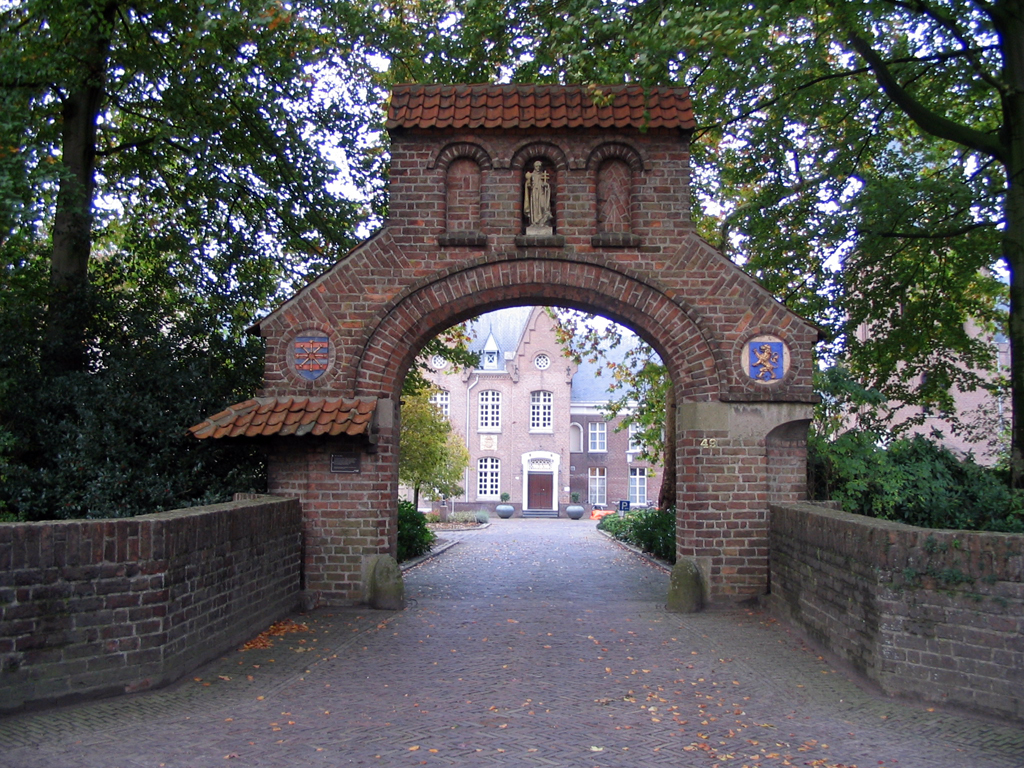
Gate of Berne Abbey

== Foundation ==
Berne Abbey was founded in 1134, the year of Norbert of Xanten's death, by the knight and nobleman Fulcold of Berne, lord of Teisterband, in the Dutch town of Berne, on the banks of the river Maas, two miles south-east of Heusden and about six miles north-west of 's-Hertogenbosch.

Numerous legends surround its foundation. One is that Fulcold, when hotly pressed in battle, made a vow to build an abbey, if, by throwing himself into the river Maas, his life might be preserved from the enemy. This prayer having been heard, Fulcold converted his castle at Berne into a monastery, where he himself became a lay brother. Blessed Fulcold died on April 12, 1149, on which day his name is recorded in the hagiology of the Premonstratensian order.

Fulcold initially brought Augustinian canons from Rolduc Abbey to Berne to start the monastery, but was dissatisfied with their lack of discipline, and sent them back again. He made another attempt at a foundation in 1134 with the newly established Premonstratensian Order, also called Norbertines after their founder Norbert of Xanten. From the nearby Mariënweerd Abbey an abbot and some canons were sent to his castle. This time Fulcold himself also joined the community. His wife, Bescela, also chose a religious life in Berne and later in the monastery of Altforst, a Norbertine nunnery linked to the abbey. The appointed guardians of the abbey were at first the dukes of Cleve. In 1248 the dukes of Brabant took over this duty and finally in 1399 the counts of Holland and the Dukes of Guelders.

== Middle Ages till 1857 ==
Berne Abbey has always been held in high esteem, as is proved by the privileges which were granted to it. It possessed the right of patronage over nine parishes, which were always served by priests from the abbey. In comparison with the contemporaneous monastic foundations in Germany and Belgium, Berne Abbey was relatively late to acquire these parishes. After a century of existence the monastery changed its direction. The strict monastic period ended and the focus shifted now from works in the monastery to work outside the abbey. Not only the secular authority, but also the spiritual authority of the abbey grew, making it a spiritual and secular center in this region of The Netherlands. Priests were sent to parishes and the parishes given to the abbey, often with all the additional rights. In this way the village of Berlicum came into the possession of Berne Abbey in 1240, and Heeswijk in 1284. In 1285 Oudheusden, Elshout, Hedikhuizen, Vlijmen and Engelen were added to them, and in 1369 Bokhoven, in 1613 Lithoyen, in 1846 Haarsteeg, and in 1948 Middelrode. Finally in 1964 the parish of Heikant-Quirijnstok in Tilburg was given into the care of abbey by the diocese of 's-Hertogenbosch. The villages of Dinther and Vorstenbosch are now also linked to the abbey.

In 1572, during the Eighty Years' War, the abbey was plundered by the Geuzen. On 25 September 1579, it was burned down. In 1648, when the Peace of Münster was signed, the abbey's last remaining estates were confiscated by the States of Holland.

The canons withdrew inside the thick city walls of 's-Hertogenbosch. After the siege of 's-Hertogenbosch in 1629 they sought shelter in the various parishes and in the safer southern part of the Netherlands. The religious were not discouraged, and the abbot obtained a house at Vilvoorde, near Brussels, from which he directed the spiritual and temporal interests of his dispersed community. Several of the priests of Berne, though compelled to remain in hiding and always in danger, continued to minister to the spiritual needs of their people, which may account for some parts of North Brabant and Gelderland remaining Roman Catholic. The future of the community was provided for by the admission of postulants, who made their novitiate and continued their studies at Vilvoorde or in one of the Belgian abbeys. In this way Berne Abbey has been kept up, while nearly all other monasteries, which had made no such provision, have died out in the Netherlands.

Though dispersed, the canons met frequently at Heeswijk or in some presbytery, and at the death of the abbot they always elected another, so that from the foundation of the abbey in 1134, there is an unbroken succession of abbots.

== Heeswijk ==
At the end of the eighteenth century the French Republic confiscated the house at Vilvoorde and so put an end to the community's refuge in Belgium. But novices continued to be admitted, who had their time of probation and made their studies either at the house at Heeswijk or in some presbytery of the order.

King William I of the Netherlands confirmed the continued existence of the abbey in 1824, as did Pope Gregory XVI in 1832. The abbots lived mostly in Heeswijk, where they had a small castle. With the arrival of better times Abbot Neefs in 1847 enlarged it and inaugurated the community life.

In 1857 the abbey was finally located in Heeswijk and in 1879 a new abbey church was built, which was enlarged in 1927 by architect Hendrik Willem Valk with money donated by farmers after the death of the peasant apostle Gerlacus van den Elsen, to whom on the outside wall the sculptor Joseph Cantre cut a cornerstone of his portrait as a tribute. The architect Valk also designed the abbey gate. The new main building dates from 1999 and was designed by the architect Oomen. In 2006 the interior of the church was substantially changed by the realignment of the different floor levels on a single surface. The second organ was moved to the balcony. The pewa were removed and replaced by chairs. The church was painted in three shades of yellow and equipped with a new lighting system.

The community grew in numbers, and in 1886 the abbot opened a college, entirely staffed by priests from the abbey. The Gymnasium St. Norbert was established, and still exists today as the Gymnasium Bernrode. Around 1920 the abbey began production of their liturgical publications in their own printing office. By acting as publishers and booksellers their religious message was spread. Next to the abbey there is a still a printing office, a bookshop and a publishing group for Liturgy.

== Abroad ==
In 1893 the abbot was able to comply with the pressing request of Bishop Messmer of Green Bay, Wisconsin, U.S., to send some priests whose special mission would be to minister to the spiritual needs of Belgian and Dutch settlers in his diocese. Prior Pennings, Father Lambert Broens, and a lay brother were sent in 1895, and were soon followed by other priests. In 1898 St. Joseph's church at De Pere was transferred to the Norbertine Fathers. The first stone of St. Norbert College for classical and commercial students was laid in 1901.

The abbey founded, or in some cases re-founded, a number of communities, including:

- St. Norbert Abbey, De Pere in Wisconsin, USA (1893)
- St. Norbert Abbey, Jamtara in India (1923)
- Windberg Abbey in Windberg in Lower Bavaria, Germany (1923)
- Rot an der Rot Abbey in Rot an der Rot in Upper Swabia, Baden-Württemberg, Germany (1948–1959)
- Priory De Essenburgh, Hierden, The Netherlands (1950)
- Hamborn Abbey in Duisburg, North Rhine-Westphalia, Germany (1960)
- Priory De Schans Tilburg, The Netherlands (1964)
- Communiteit Mariëngaard, Hierden, The Netherlands (1992)
- Nogent-l'Artaud in France (not successful)
- Brisbane in Australia (not successful)

== Recent abbots of Berne ==
- Gerardus Neefs (1842–1859)
- Hubertus Manni (1859–1867)
- Andreas van Laarhoven (1867–1870)
- Henricus van den Brand (1871–1873)
- Adrianus Ceelen (1874–1885)
- Augustinus Bazelmans (1885–1908)
- Evermodus van den Berg (1908–1930)
- Henricus Stöcker (1930–1942)
- Milo Ondersteijn (1942–1959)
- Albertus Haselager (1959–1967)
- mgr. Marcellus van de Ven (1968–1982)
- Arthur Baeten (1982–2000)
- Petrus Al (2001–2007)
- Eduard Cortvriendt (2007 - )

== Images ==
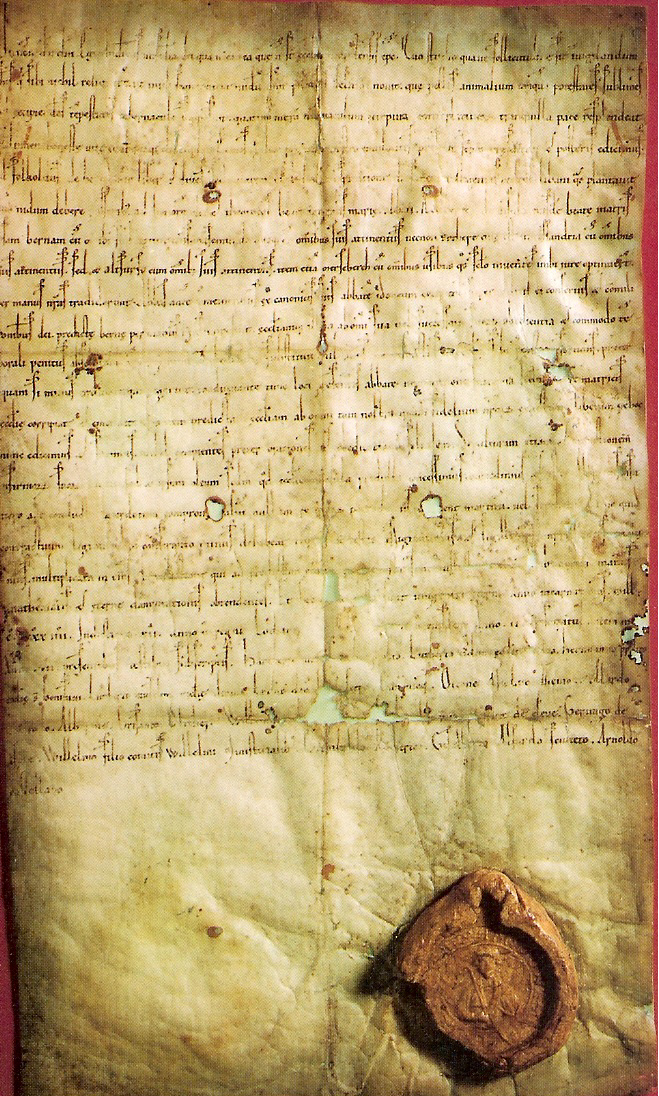
Foundation Charter

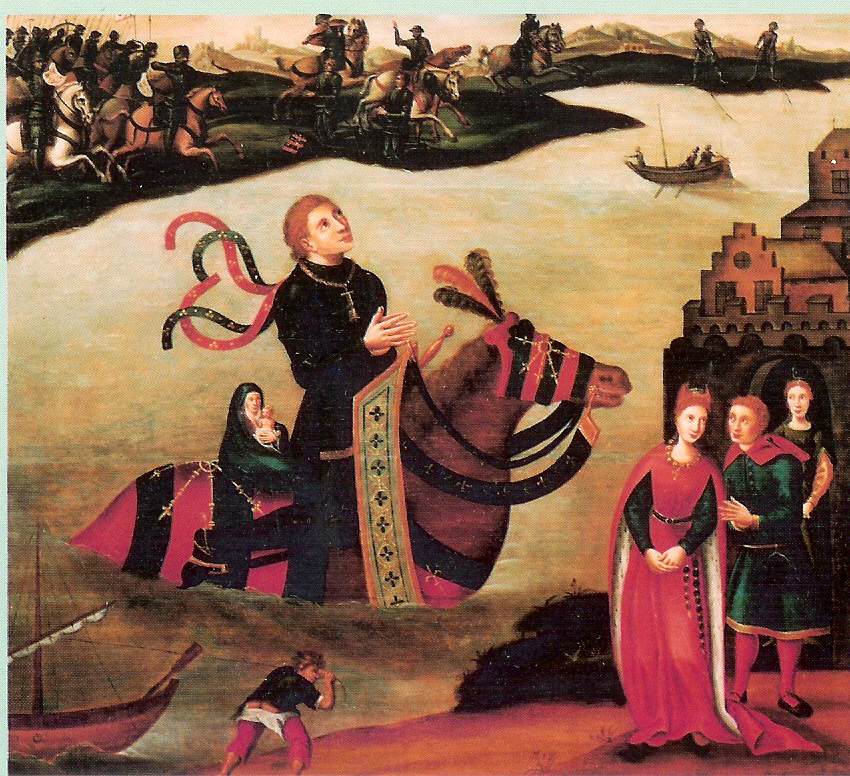
Fulcold of Berne

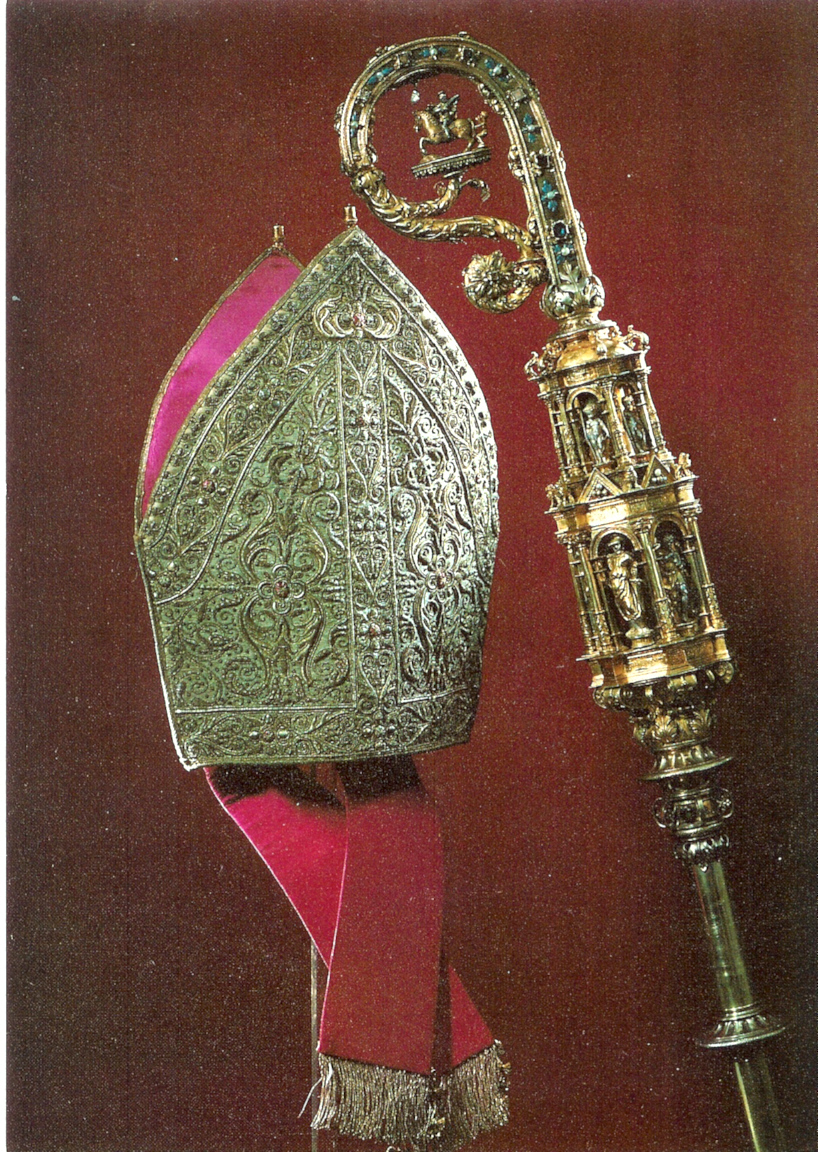
Staff and mitre 1536

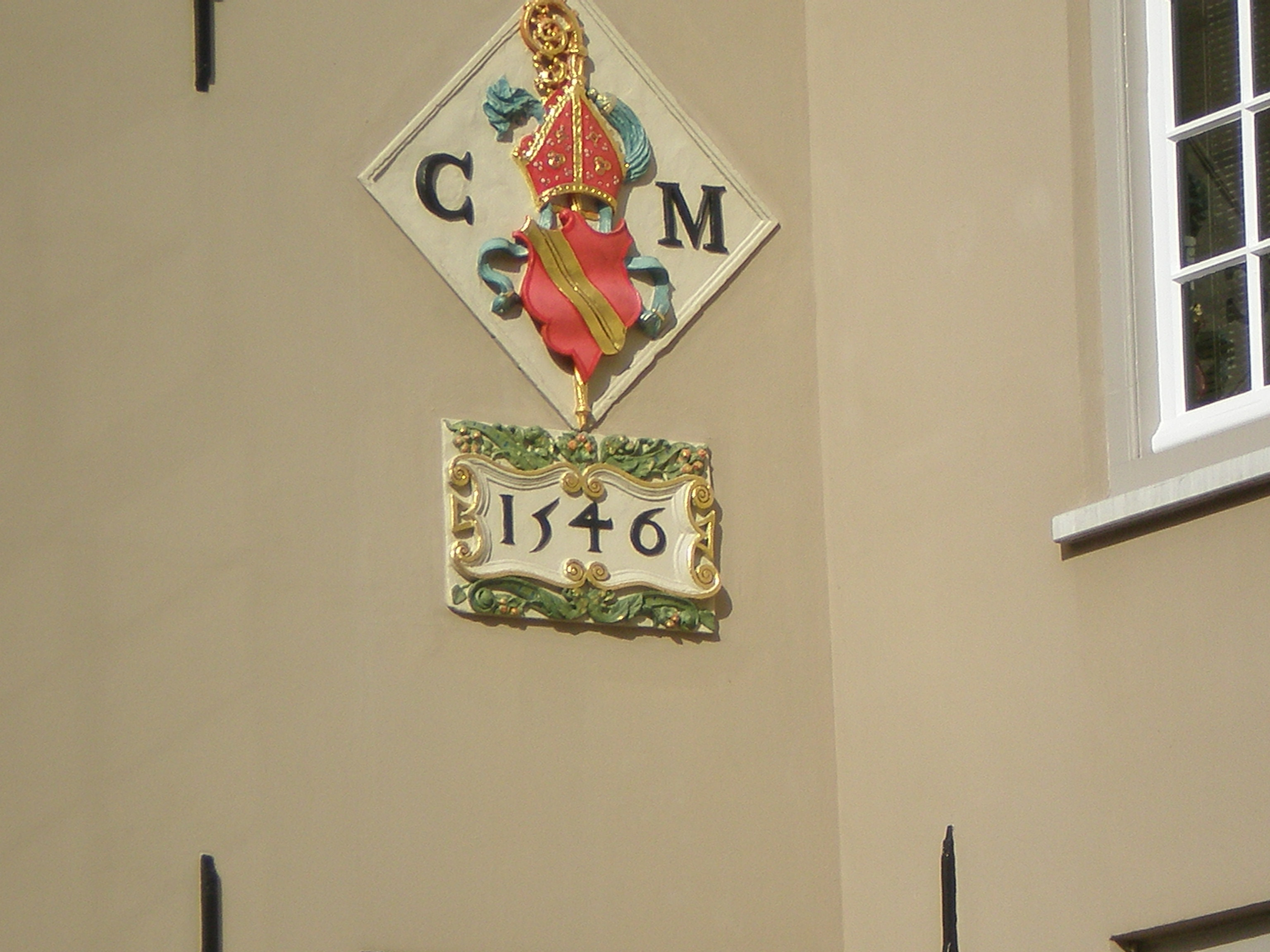
Coat of arms of abbot Van Malsen in the old castle

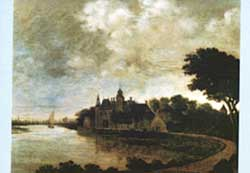
Abbey, 17th century

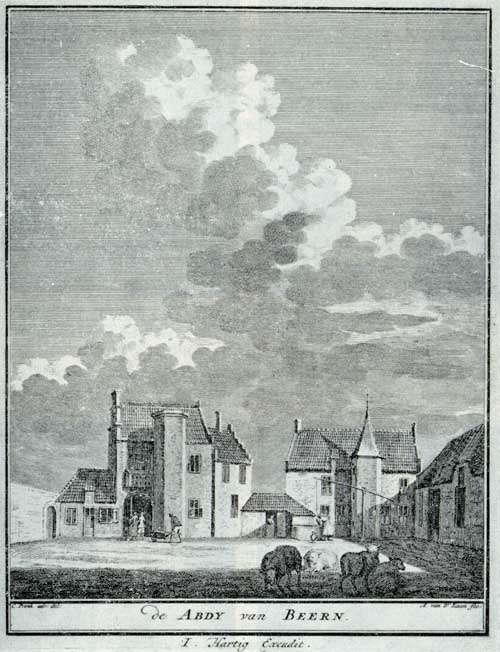
Abbey, 18th century

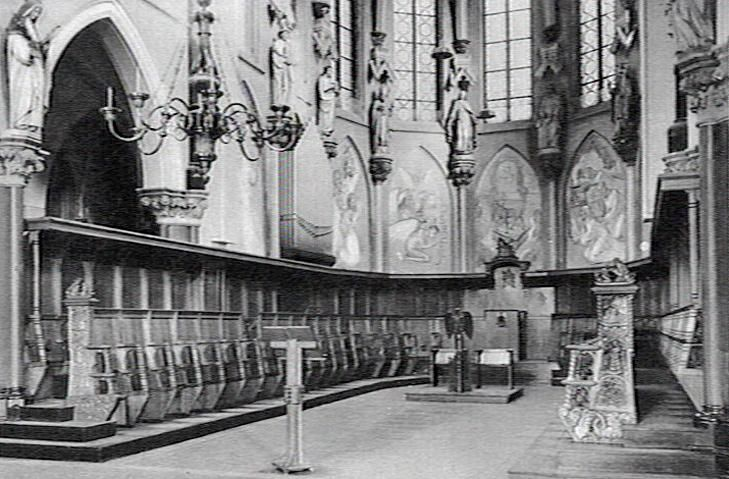
Abbey church in 1934

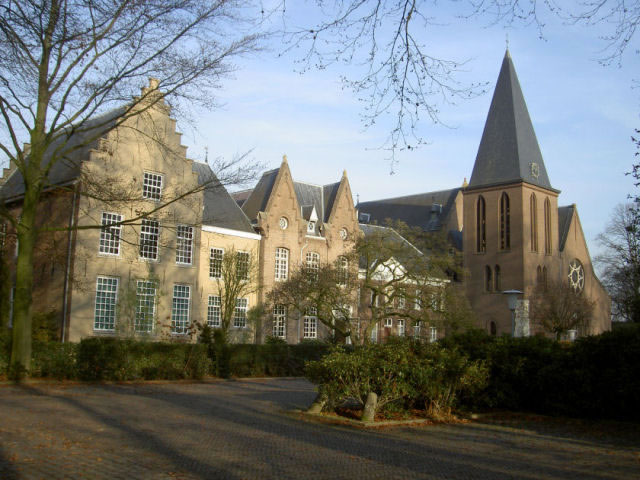
Front of Berne Abbey

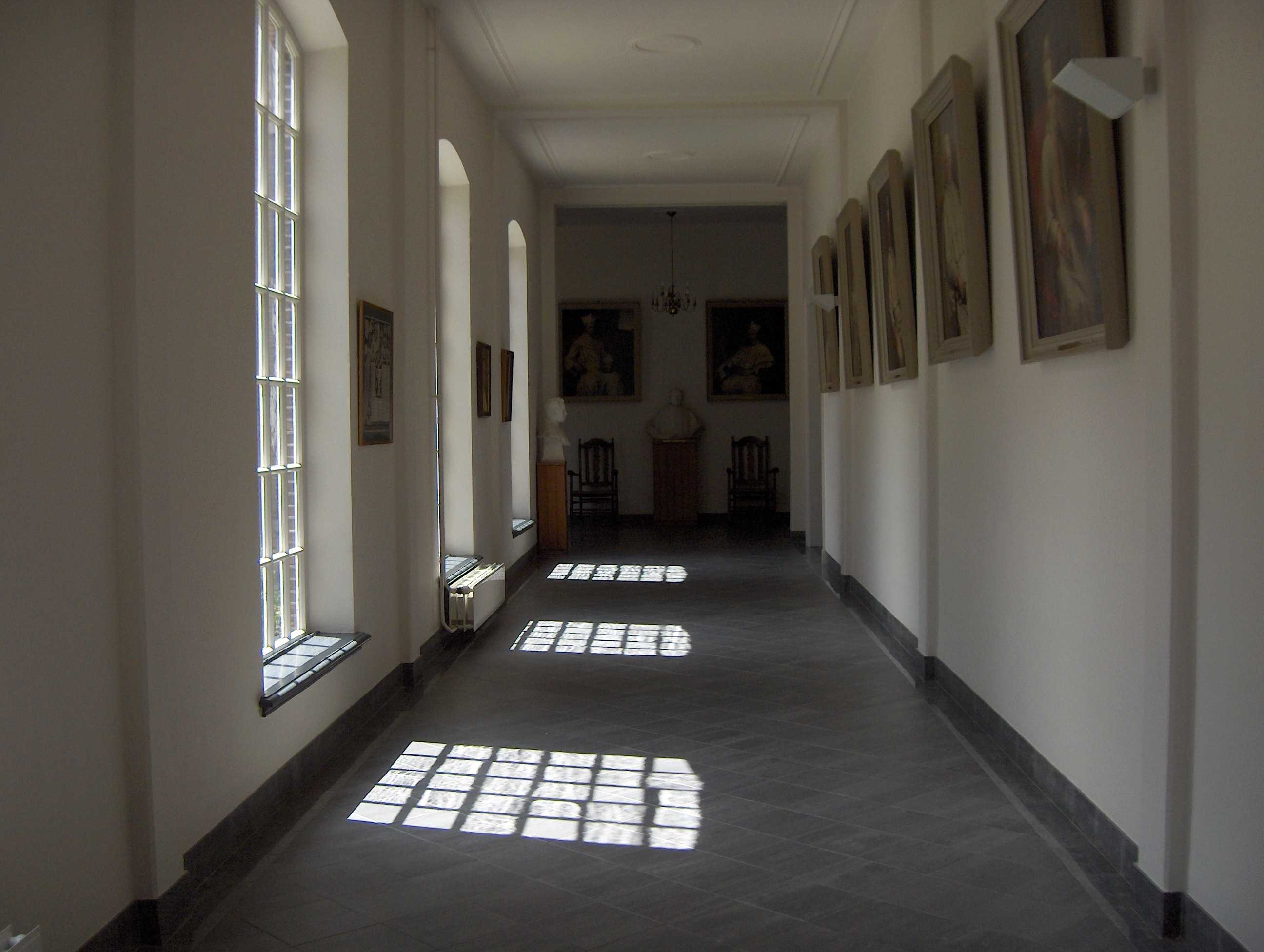
Cloister of Berne Abbey

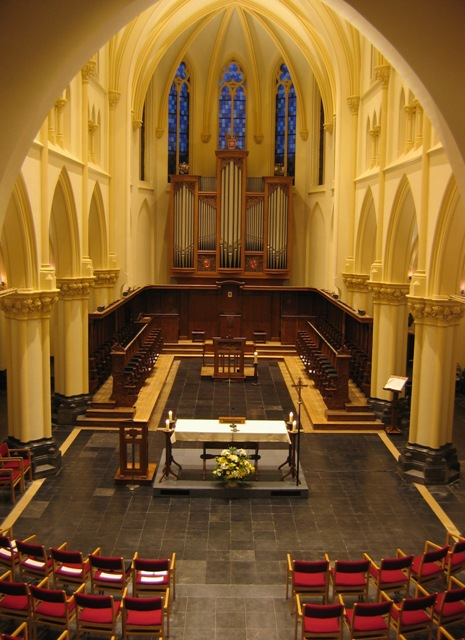
Abbey church
