= Simon Hofer (sculptor) =

German sculptor (1683–1749)

Simon Hofer (1683–1749) was a German sculptor in Straubing, mainly of church sculptures. Around 1710 he worked as an apprentice in Regensburg. In 1713 he married the step-daughter of the sculptor Franz Mozart in Kumpfmühl. In 1718 he settled in Geiselhöring, became master and member of the carpenter's guild. He died in Straubing.

== Selected works ==
- Ascha, Parish Church of the Assumption of the Virgin Mary: side statues of the high altar, 1749.
- Hadersbach (Geiselhöring), Parish Church of the Assumption of the Virgin Mary: high altar: statues of John the Evangelist and John the Baptist, angels, 1721.
- Haimbuch (Mötzing), St. Margaret's Church: statues of the high altar, 1740.
- Haindling (Geiselhöring), Church of the Assumption of the Virgin Mary: stucco capitals of the pillars, 1721; trumpet angel of the pulpit, 1721; statues of Saint Joachim and Saint Anne between the outer columns of the high altar, 1729.
- Hainsbach (Geiselhöring), St. John's Parish Church: Mater Dolorosa; triumphal cross, between 1741 and 1743.
- Obertunding (Mengkofen), St. Catherine's Parish Church: Saint Roch, Christ of the Resurrection, altar figures, 1718.
- Straubing, St. Vitus Church: organ case: foliage and genii, 1741.
- Windberg, Abbey Church of the Assumption of the Virgin Mary: tabernacle figures.

Among works attributed to him are:

- Sossau (Straubing), Church of the Assumption of the Virgin Mary: four candlestick angels; Saint Augustine and Saint Norbert, pulpit figures.

== Gallery ==
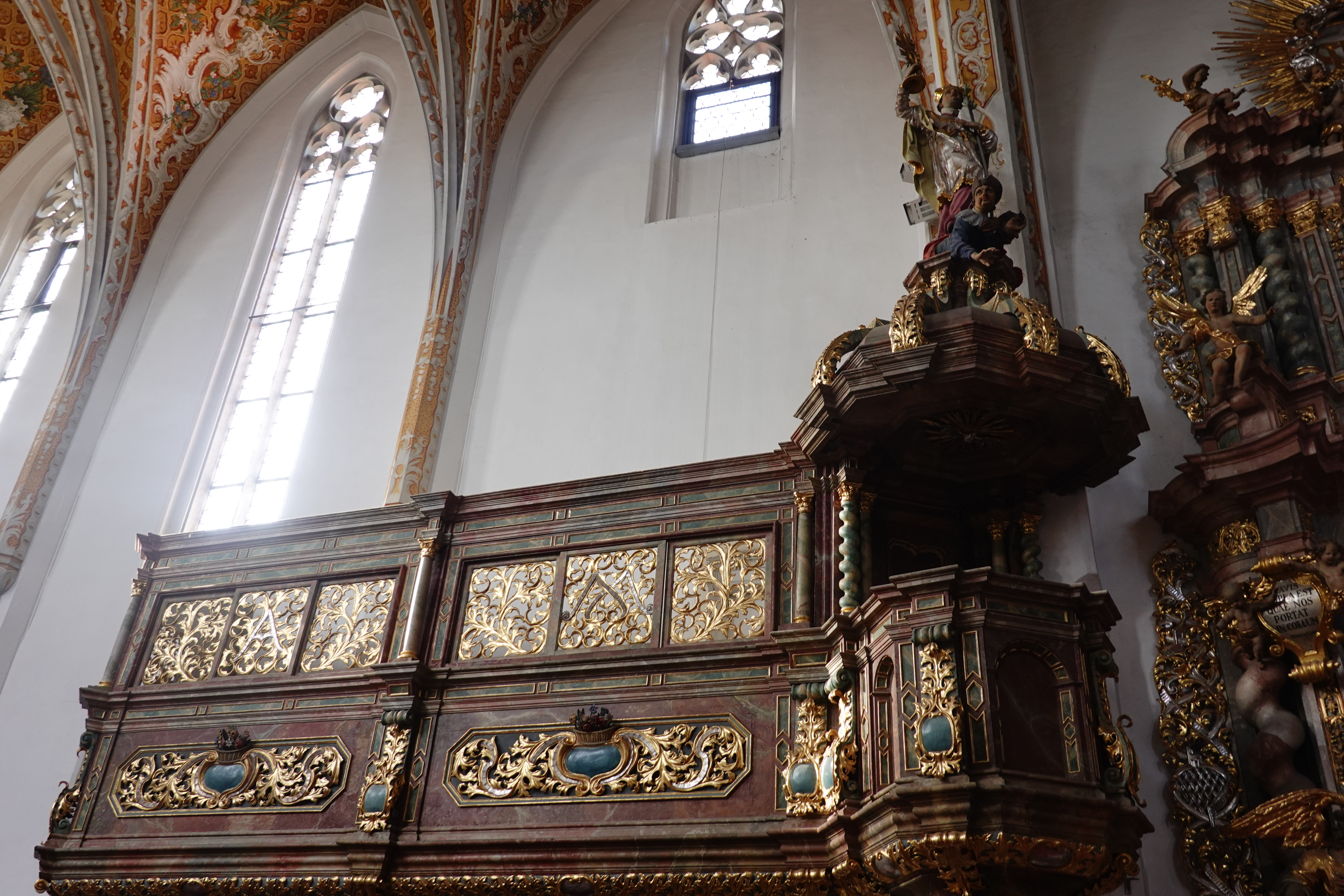
Sossau: figures at the pulpit

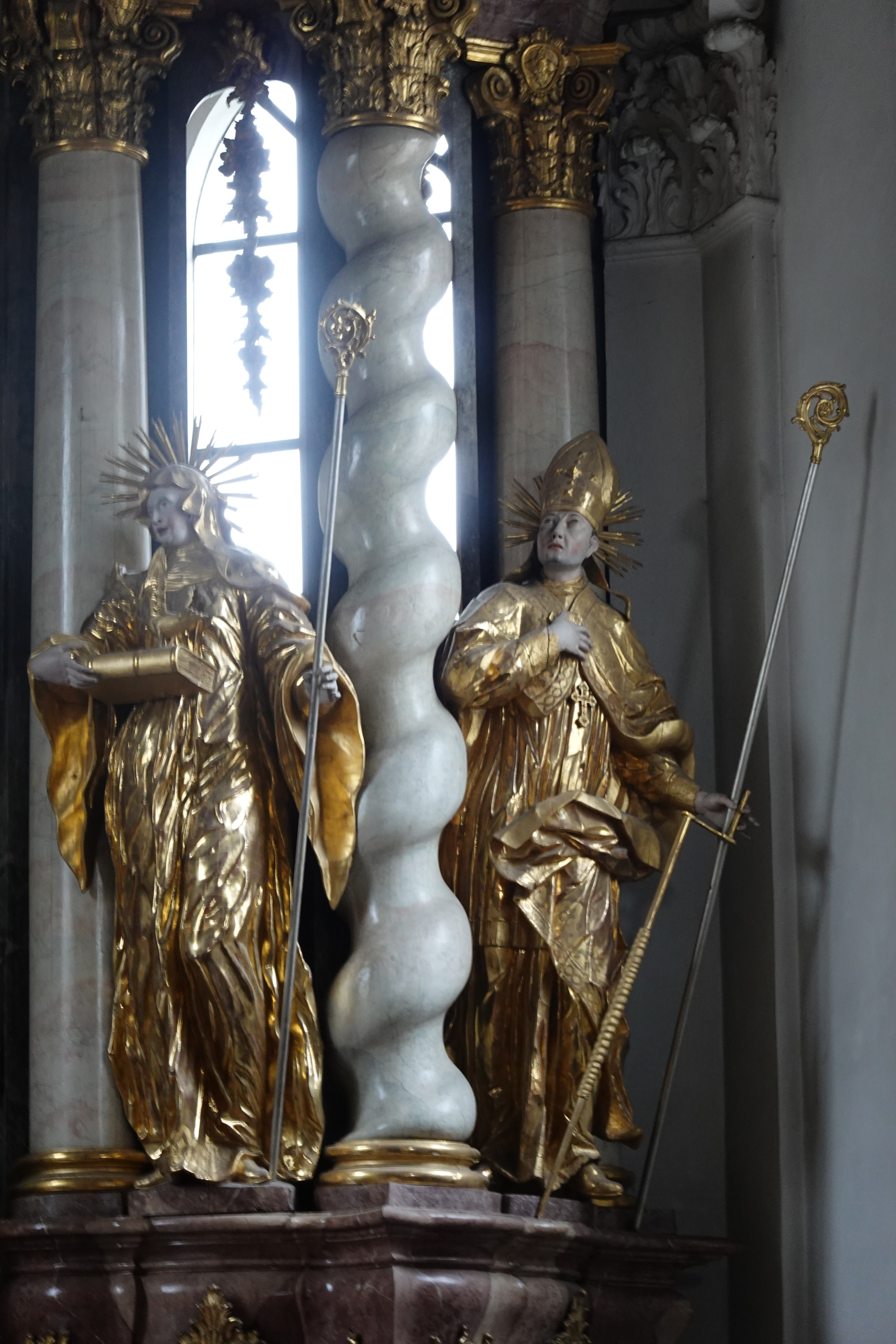
Rinchnach: statues

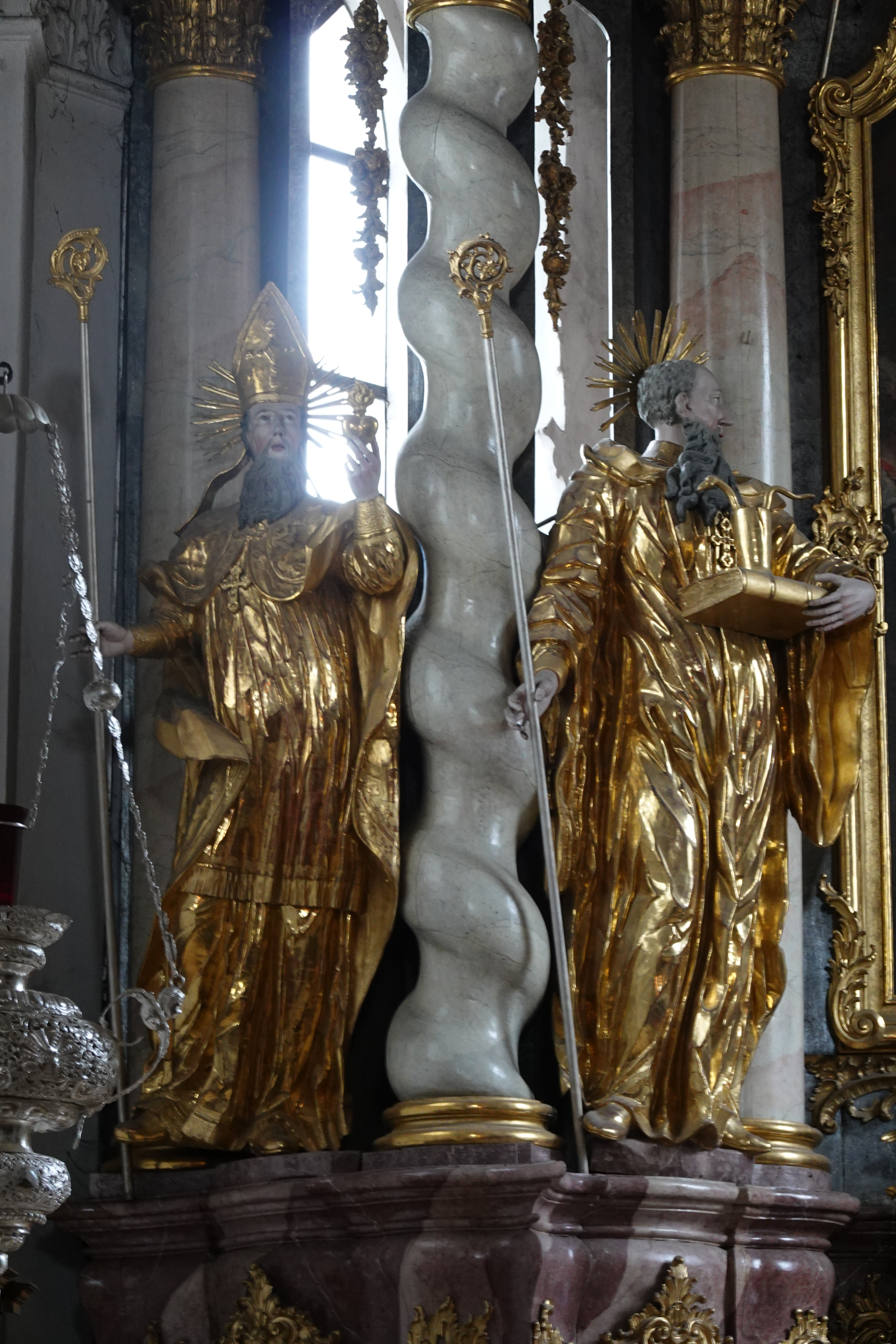
Rinchnach: statues
