= Henk Timmer =

Dutch former professional footballer (born 1971)

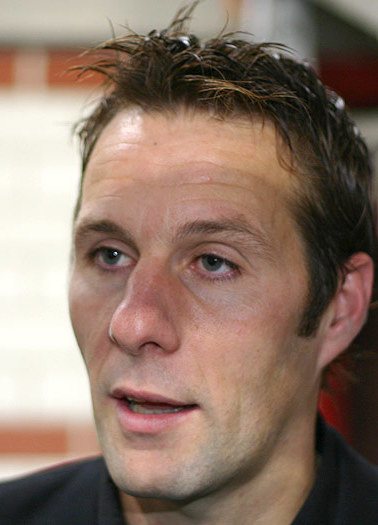
- Timmer circa 2008

Personal information
- Full name: Hendrik Timmer
- Date of birth: 3 December 1971 (age 54)
- Place of birth: Hierden, Netherlands
- Height: 1.88 m (6 ft 2 in)
- Position: Goalkeeper

Youth career
- VV Hierden

Senior career*
Years	Team	Apps	(Gls)
1989–2000	Zwolle	285	(0)
2000–2006	AZ	130	(0)
2001–2002	→ Feyenoord (loan)	2	(0)
2002–2003	→ Ajax (loan)	2	(0)
2006–2009	Feyenoord	94	(0)
2010	Heerenveen	9	(0)
Total		522	(0)

International career
2005–2008	Netherlands	7	(0)
- * Club domestic league appearances and goals

Hendrik "Henk" Timmer (born 3 December 1971) is a Dutch former professional footballer who played as a goalkeeper.

== Club career ==
Timmer was born in Hierden, Harderwijk, Gelderland. He spent his first 11 senior seasons in the second division, with FC Zwolle – named PEC in his first year. In 2000, he moved to AZ Alkmaar, making his Eredivisie debut at almost 29 and also serving unassuming loans at Feyenoord and AFC Ajax. He was part of the Feyenoord squad that won the 2001–02 UEFA Cup, and was an unused substitute in the final.

In 2003 Timmer returned to AZ for three more solid seasons, being essential as the club finished runner-up in the 2006 league and the following year's domestic cup. He made another return in the 2006 summer, now to Feyenoord, leaving Alkmaar after an alleged fall-out with manager Louis van Gaal.

Timmer retired from the game at almost 38, after helping Feyenoord to the seventh place in 2008–09 campaign, having appeared in 513 matches as a professional – only in the league. However, in March 2010, as SC Heerenveen had all three first-team goalkeepers on the injured list, he went on trial with the club and signed a contract until the end of the season, contributing with nine games to an eventual 11th place-finish, and retiring for good in June.

In June 2012, Timmer was appointed as technical/commercial manager of second level club AGOVV Apeldoorn.

== International career ==
Somewhat of a late bloomer in the Dutch national side, Timmer did not get his first call-up until February 2005, being summoned by Marco van Basten for an exhibition game with England in Birmingham. His debut would only arrive on 12 November, in another friendly (1–3 home loss to Italy).

Timmer won seven caps for his country but never in official games, representing the nation at the 2006 FIFA World Cup and UEFA Euro 2008.

== Personal life ==
Timmer is married to speed skater Marianne Timmer, however they are separated. After retiring in 2009, he said Heerenveen would be the only club he would play for if he decided to return, as she had previously experienced success in Heerenveen's Thialf.

== Career statistics ==
Appearances and goals by club, season and competition
Club	Season	League		
Club	Season	Division	Apps	Goals
PEC Zwolle	1989–90	Eerste Divisie	1	0
PEC Zwolle	1990–91	Eerste Divisie	0	0
PEC Zwolle	1991–92	Eerste Divisie	16	0
PEC Zwolle	1992–93	Eerste Divisie	33	0
PEC Zwolle	1993–94	Eerste Divisie	34	0
PEC Zwolle	1994–95	Eerste Divisie	34	0
PEC Zwolle	1995–96	Eerste Divisie	33	0
PEC Zwolle	1996–97	Eerste Divisie	34	0
PEC Zwolle	1997–98	Eerste Divisie	32	0
PEC Zwolle	1998–99	Eerste Divisie	34	0
PEC Zwolle	1999–2000	Eerste Divisie	34	0
PEC Zwolle	Total		285	0
AZ	2000–01	Eredivisie	30	0
AZ	2003–04	Eredivisie	34	0
AZ	2004–05	Eredivisie	34	0
AZ	2005–06	Eredivisie	32	0
AZ	Total		130	0
Feyenoord (loan)	2001–02	Eredivisie	2	0
Ajax (loan)	2002–03	Eredivisie	2	0
Feyenoord	2006–07	Eredivisie	32	0
Feyenoord	2007–08	Eredivisie	32	0
Feyenoord	2008–09	Eredivisie	30	0
Feyenoord	Total		94	0
SC Heerenveen	2009–10	Eredivisie	9	0
Career total			522	0

== Honours ==
Feyenoord

- KNVB Cup: 2007–08
- UEFA Cup: 2001–02
