= Biberach =

Biberach may refer to:

- Biberach an der Riß, a town in Upper Swabia, Germany
- Biberach (district), which has Biberach an der Riß as its capital
- Biberach, Baden, a municipality in the Ortenaukreis, Germany
- Biberach is a part of Roggenburg, Bavaria, Germany
- Biberach is also a part of the town of Heilbronn, Germany

== See also ==
- Battle of Biberach (1800), a May 9, 1800 battle at Biberach an der Riß
