= Gymnasium Bernrode =

Coordinates: 51.65336°N 5.47145°E

Location
- Abdijstraat 36; Heeswijk-Dinther; Netherlands

Information
- School type: Norbertine secondary school
- Website: https://www.bernrode.nl

Gymnasium Bernrode is a gymnasium in Heeswijk, Netherlands. It was established in 1886 by Gerlacus van den Elsen, abbot of the Berne Abbey, a Norbertine monastery.

== History ==
In 1886, Gerlacus van den Elsen, one of the Norbertine monks, founded the seminary Gymnasium St. Norbertus. Around 1950 this school had 125 students, most of them boarders. A disadvantage was that the seminary could not issue any officially recognized diplomas. In order to receive such a certificate the students had to pass a state examination. In the 1950s it was decided this had to be changed but the limited size of the school was a problem. Hence it was decided to cooperate with another seminary. The combination of schools took the name ‘Gymnasium Bernrode’ and in 1961 received permission to issue official diplomas.

Day students were also admitted so that the young people in the area could also profit from an education at a gymnasium: first boys only and later on girls were allowed as well. In the sixties the number of boarders diminished while the number of day students from the surrounding areas increased. This resulted in the closing down of both boarding schools at the beginning of the 1970s.

== Notable alumni ==
- Jan Marijnissen, politician
- Louis Sévèke, journalist
