= St. Norbert Abbey =

Norbertine monastery in De Pere, Wisconsin

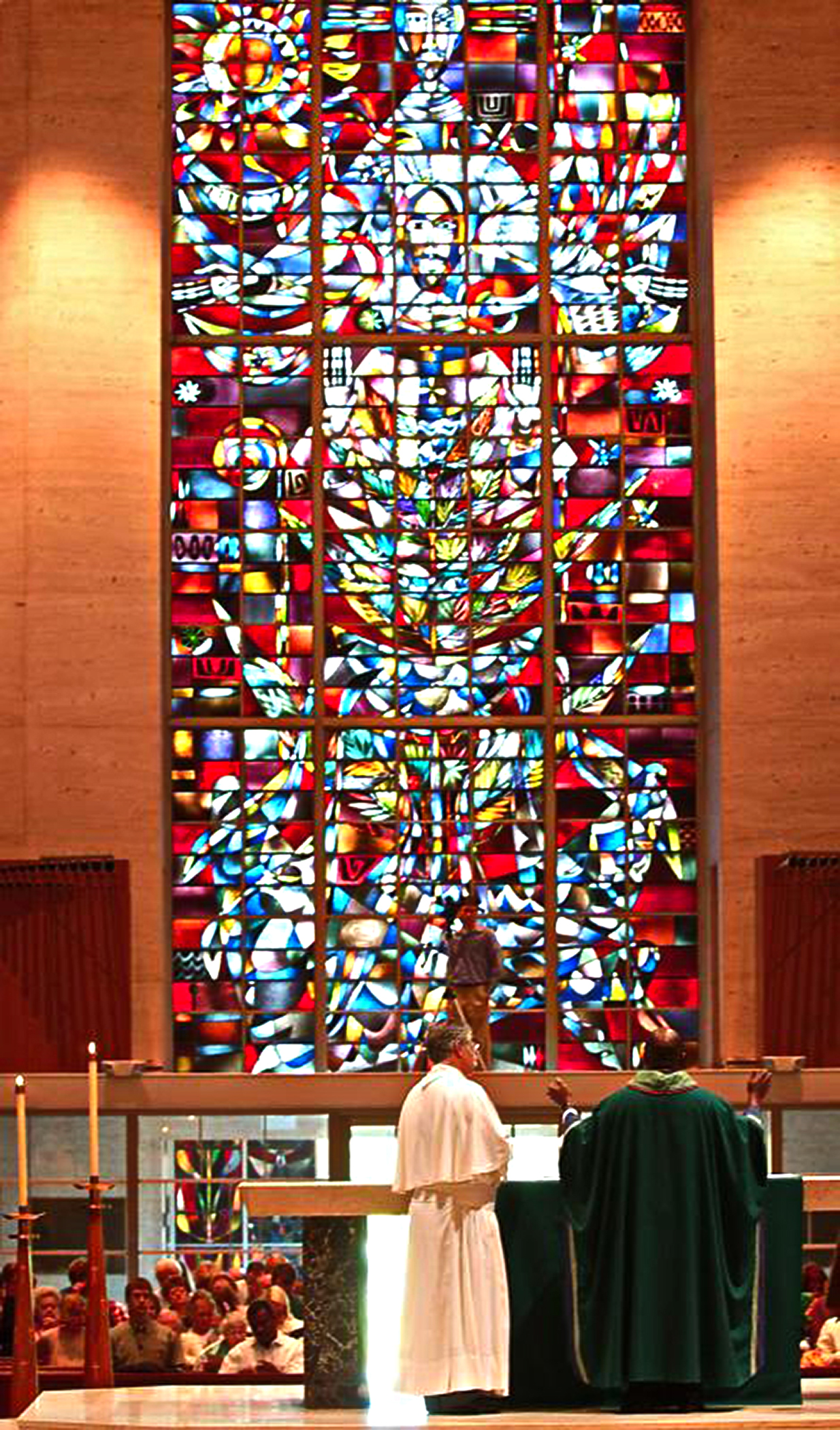
- Interior view of the church of St. Norbert Abbey, facing the Great West Window

- Location within Wisconsin Location within the United States

Monastery information
- Order: Order of Premontre (O.Praem.)
- Established: 1898
- Mother house: Berne Abbey
- Diocese: Roman Catholic Diocese of Green Bay

People
- Founders: Bernard H. Pennings, O.Praem
- Abbot: Bradley Vanden Branden, O.Praem.
- Prior: Timothy Shillcox, O.Praem.

Site
- Location: De Pere, Wisconsin, USA
- Coordinates: 44.457808°N 88.045142°W
- Public access: Yes
- Website: www.norbertines.org

St. Norbert Abbey is a Roman Catholic monastery of Canons Regular of Premontre, located in De Pere, Wisconsin. The Abbey is named after Saint Norbert of Xanten (c. 1180–1134), the founder of the order, after whom, members are known as, "Norbertines". St. Norbert Abbey was established in 1898 by Norbertines from Berne Abbey in the Netherlands. St. Norbert's is the oldest religious community of its kind in the United States, serving as the Mother Canonry to Norbertines across North America.

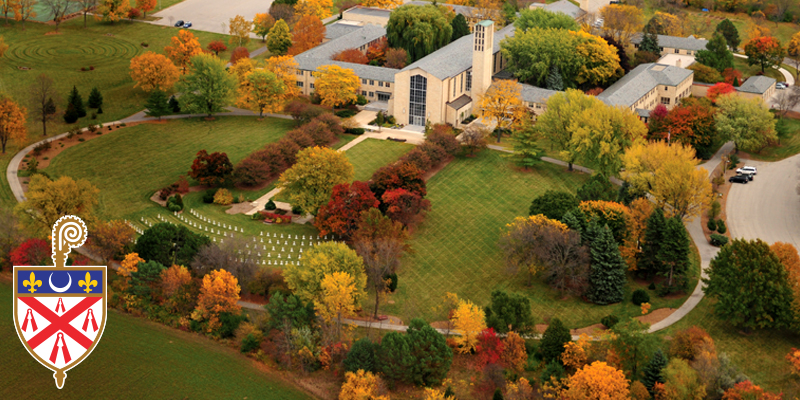
St. Norbert Abbey is the Mother Church for the Premonstratensians in North America

The Abbey is situated on 160 acres (0.65 km^{2}) of land east of the Fox River, south of Green Bay, Wisconsin, within the Roman Catholic Diocese of Green Bay.

The members of the community combine a monastic-style life with the active ministry of ordained priests. Priests and Brothers of the Abbey serve in parish churches, at parochial schools and at St. Norbert College, whose founder, Bernard Pennings, was the First Abbot the community.

== History ==
Norbert of Xanten founded the Norbertines Christmas Day, 1121 in Prémontré, France. The son of a wealthy landholder, Norbert was given to life as a Canon (a minor cleric, as Norbert wasn't yet a Priest) of the Collegiate Church in Xanten, Germany, where he is said to have been unfocused and driven by things other than religious life.

Canons of the Church were required to spend time in choir each day, singing several hours according to the various liturgies prescribed by the Catholic Church. Rather than spending the hours in Church, Norbert would go on adventures and hunts, until his conversion experience in 1112, when he become totally committed to the Christian Faith.

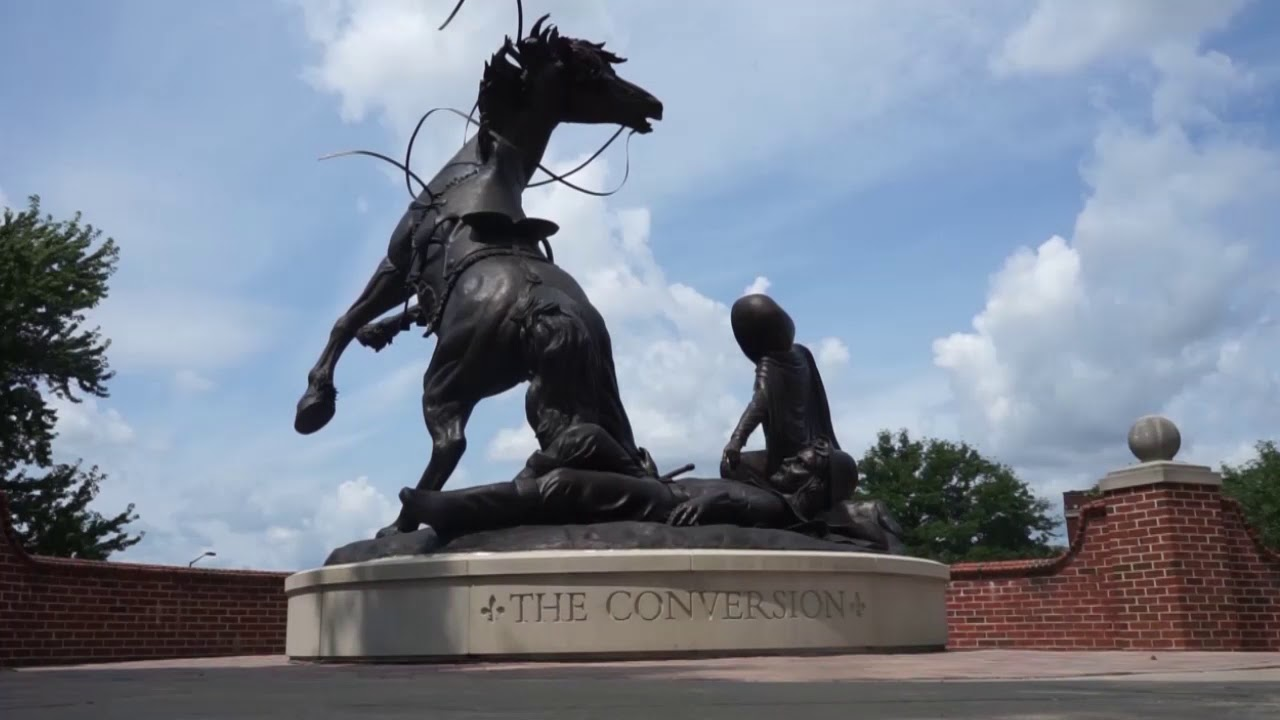
The Conversion of St. Norbert statue at St. Norbert College

Norbert became a Priest in 1115 and devoted his life to the reform of the Canons under a rule of life established by St. Augustine of Hippo, who is counted with Norbert as a Father of the Premonstratensian Order, which Norbert founded to support his ideal for reform of the Church. In Norbert's lifetime, his fledgling order spread from Ireland to the Holy Land. Wherever he went, people with a zeal for the Church supported his efforts.

In 1125, Norbert went to Antwerp, preaching in opposition to Tanchelm, whose teachings the Catholic Church opposed. The success of Norbert's mission in Antwerp and across the Low Countries, led to the foundation of Norbertine Abbeys in the Netherlands and Belgium. Among these religious communities was Berne Abbey, located in North Brabant, the Netherlands. Berne was established in 1134, the same year as Norbert's death.

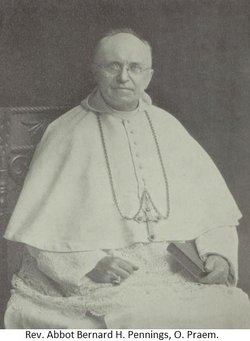
Bernard Henry Pennings, founder of the Premonstratensians in the United States

Centuries later, Norbertine Priests led by Bernard Pennings, came from Berne and established an Abbey in Wisconsin. Pennings established a network of Norbertine schools and Parishes, establishing St. Norbert College as a seminary, then a college of business. In 1898, St. Joseph Parish, in West De Pere, Wisconsin became affiliated with the Norbetines and served as the Abbey Church for decades.

In the 1950s, a growing Premonstratensian community at the Abbey had outgrown the available space within the original buildings. Land was donated in 1954, for the purpose relocating the monastery, and building a new Abbey Church. June 9, 1956 marked the beginning of construction and by February 1, 1959, the community inhabited their new headquarters.

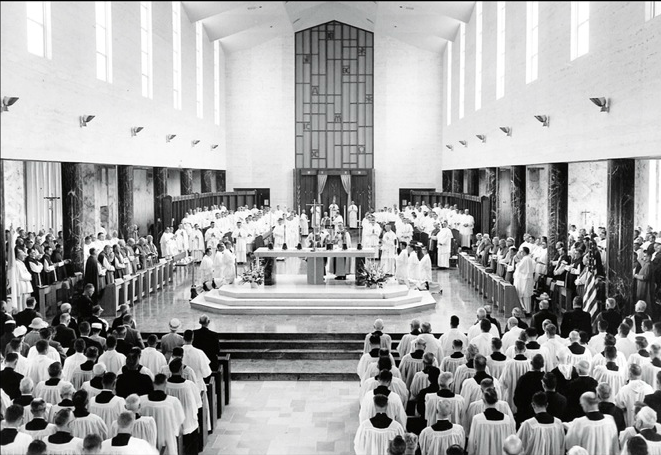
Norbertines gather for the dedication of the new St. Norbert Abbey

== Liturgy and architecture ==
The Norbertine Order is known for the solemnity of its liturgies, reflecting Norbert's devotion to the Eucharist. Members of the community wear the Order's traditional white habit in Church. The Community chants the daily office from its own liturgical books in English each day, with Marian hymns chanted in Latin.

The Abbey is known for the chanting of the hours, its symbolic; yet modern stained glass, and its pipe organ.

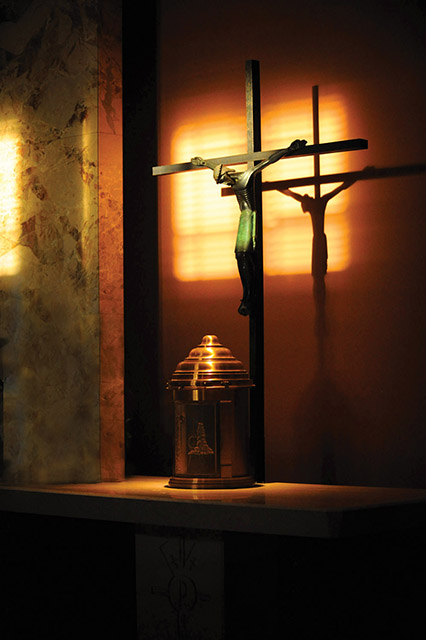
The Blessed Sacrament Chapel at St. Norbert Abbey, with the sun enlightening the crucifix on a feast day

=== Design ===
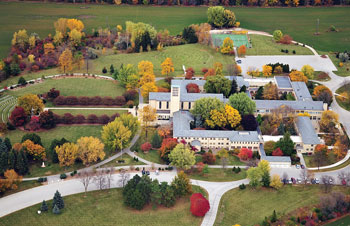

St. Norbert's was completed in the years before the Second Vatican Council by the Second Abbot, Sylvester Michael Killeen, O. Praem. (1905-2000). It reflects the Liturgical Movement, preceding the council. The Abbey Church is built in the basilica style, with a well appointed nave and a long choir. Its use of travertine, and polished marble of deep green or white provide a sense of permanence and grandeur to the austere design.

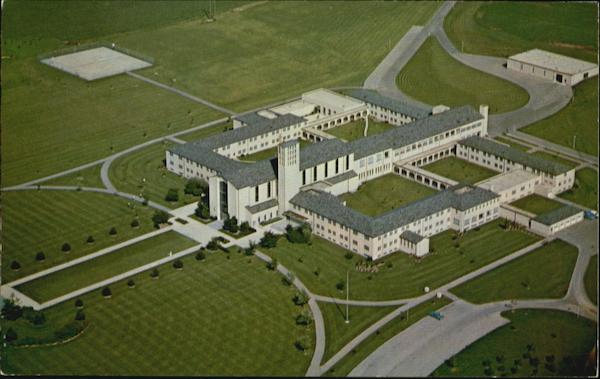
St. Norbert Abbey in De Pere, Wisconsin: an aerial image shortly after the Abbey was finished in 1962.

The new St. Norbert Abbey building project was designed by a Wisconsin architectural firm; Berners, Schober, and Kilp. Modeled after centuries-old European Norbertine and Cistercian monasteries, the materials utilized in constructing it were selected for both their beauty and permanence. Limestone from Fond du Lac, Wisconsin, and Indiana, as well as slate from Pennsylvania and Vermont were used in construction. The building's design physically represents the history of the Norbertine Order, with a "spine stretching from west to east", at heart of the structure.

The design reflects the Cistercian ideals of Norbert of Xanten's friend, St. Bernard of Clairvaux, whose Cistercians are a similar movement to Norbert's Premonstratensians.

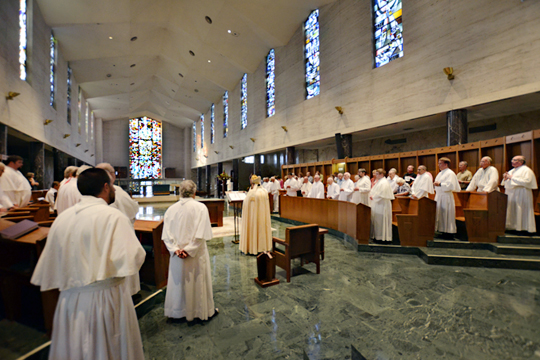
The Premonstratensians of De Pere, Wisconsin gather for prayer at St Norbert Abbey.

St. Bernard wrote against the most excessive ornamentation of the Churches in his time, saying, "...in the cloister, in the sight of the reading monks, what is the point of such ridiculous monstrosity, the strange kind of shapely shapelessness? Why these unsightly monkeys, why these fierce lions, why the monstrous centaurs, why semi-humans, why spotted tigers, why fighting soldiers, why trumpeting huntsmen? …In short there is such a variety and such a diversity of strange shapes everywhere that we may prefer to read the marbles rather than the books."

The Abbey's architecture combines a simplicity of form and line, with a grandiose scale and rich materials. It is evocative of St. Bernard's ideals, which deeply influenced the thinking of his friend Norbert.

=== Pipe organ ===
The Abbey organ is a landmark instrument by Canadian Builder Casavant Pipe Organs. In addition to its size and quality, it is the first instrument designed by tonal director Lawrence Phelps, and is somewhat atypical of his work.

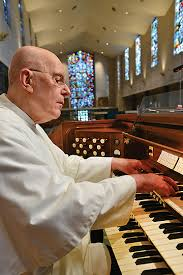
Organ of the Abbey

The Abbey uses the organ to accompany their liturgies almost every day of the year, except for days like Good Friday, when liturgical tradition precludes the uses of the pipe organ.

=== Crypt ===
The Abbey Crypt is home to the graves of the first two Abbots of St. Norbert Abbey, featuring a display of treasures used in their tenure.

It holds a historic statue of St. Joseph, which survived a fire at the original Abbey Church. A series of Altars are in a side chapel, for multiple Priests to say Mass at the same time. They include individual shrines with altars to various saints:

- Altar of Saints Peter and Paul
- Altar of St. Thomas Aquinas
- Altar of St. Luke
- Altar of St. Hermann Joseph von Steinfeld
- Altar of St. Mark
- Altar of St. Theresa of the Child Jesus
- Altar of St. John
- Altar of Saint Patrick
- Altar of St. Siard
- Altar of St. Augustine
- Altar of St. Pius X
- Altar of St. Sylvester
- Altar of Saint Monica
- Altar of St. Matthew

=== Bells ===
The set of six bells at the St. Norbert Abbey were cast in the Netherlands at the Bell-Foundry of Petit and Fritsen in Aarle-Rixtel and hung in the Abbey Church tower on July 2, 1958. Shortly before installation, they "were consecrated by His Excellency, The Most Reverend Stanislaus Vincent Bona, D.D., Bishop of the Diocese of Green Bay ... Each bell has an appropriate name, a fitting inscription, and bears the crest of the person in whose memory it is dedicated as well as the shield of St. Norbert Abbey."

On June 16, 2009, the Norbertines celebrated the 50th anniversary of the dedication of this new St. Norbert Abbey. In 2020, the Abbey celebrates the 900th Anniversary of the Order.

== Apostolates ==
Clergy from the Abbey serve in the Dioceses of Green Bay and Chicago. The Abbot is the Keeper of the National Shrine of St. Joseph, located on the campus of St. Norbert College. Priests of the Abbey have served as the Pastor of the Shrine for more than a century

Priests of the Abbey oversee local Parishes and Catholic Schools, and maintain charitable programs in Chicago and Green Bay.

=== National Shrine of St. Joseph ===
The National Shrine of St. Joseph is the Parish Church of St. Norbert College, and the home to the Crowned Statue of Joseph and the Child Jesus. The statue was moved to the Abbey from its original location, then returned to the Shrine in 2015.

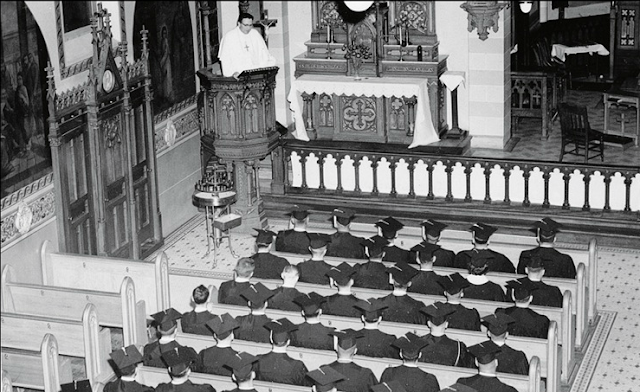
St. Joseph Church, now the National Shrine of Saint Joseph, under Abbot Pennings' leadership. St Joseph Church has since undergone major renovations

In 1888, Father Joseph Durin began work to have the statue of Saint Joseph crowned and declared a national shrine. Father Durin's efforts were rewarded, and in 1892 Pope Leo XIII officially recognized the statue as a National Shrine.

Sebastian Gebhard Messmer, Bishop of Green Bay, presided over the coronation of the statue. St. Joseph was presented with a flat (mural) crown, while the Christ Child in his arms was crowned by their Canonical crowns granted by Pope Leo XIII in 1891.

The Shrine came into care of St. Norbert Abbey in 1969 and was moved to the Abbey for some years. It was moved back to its original location at St. Joseph Church, St. Norbert College in the middle of 2015.

A weekly novena to St. Joseph, started by Father Durin in 1888 and continues with rare interruptions, Wednesdays at 12:30pm.

== Abbots of St. Norbert Abbey ==
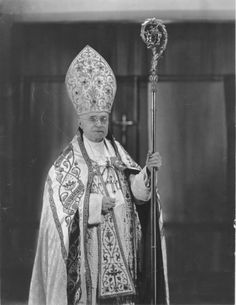
Abbot Pennings dressed for the Pontifical services of the Abbot

1. 1925–1955 — Abbot Bernard H. Pennings, O.Praem.
2. 1955–1970 — Abbot Sylvester M. Killeen, O.Praem.
3. 1970–1982 — Abbot Jerome G. Tremel, O.Praem.
4. 1982–1992 — Abbot Benjamin T. Mackin, O.Praem.
5. 1992–2003 — Abbot E. Thomas De Wane, O.Praem.
6. 2003–2018 — Abbot Gary J. Neville, O.Praem.
7. 2018–2026 — Abbot Dane J. Radecki, O.Praem.
8. 2026–present — Abbot Bradley Vanden Branden, O.Praem.

== Daughter houses ==
- Our Lady of Daylesford Abbey, Paoli, Pennsylvania
- Santa María de la Vid Abbey, Albuquerque, New Mexico

== Mission of St. Norbert Abbey ==
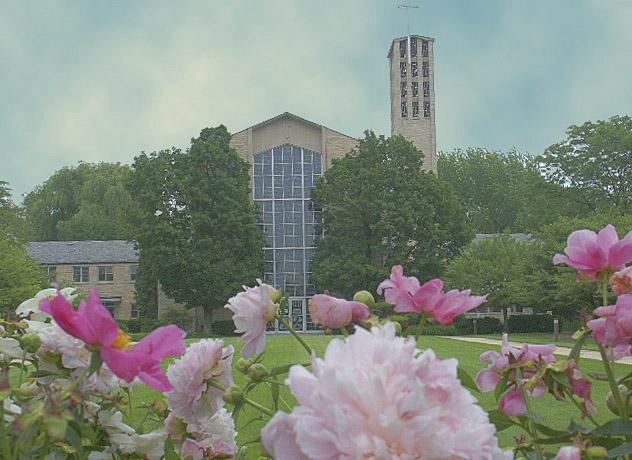
St. Norbert Abbey in Spring

Canons Regular of Saint Norbert Abbey live the Gospel of Jesus Christ in the traditions of Saints Norbert and Augustine. We live a common life “one in mind and heart on the way to God” through celebration of the Eucharist, liturgical prayer and service to the People of God.

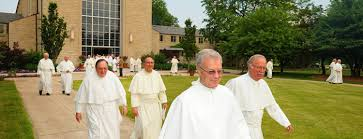
Premonstratensian canons at st. Norbert Abbey in Wisconsin

== Controversy ==
From 2019 to 2021, following an investigation commissioned by Abbot Dane Radecki, he made public the names of 24 Norbertines with credible accusations of sexual assault. This inquiry was triggered by new accusations, made to the Green Bay Press-Gazette subsequently published in a series of stories detailing the accusation and its aftermath. The featured accuser, Nate Lindstrom, made increasingly serious allegations about an increasing number of clergymen. The original accusations were made in 2002 to civil authorities, and made additional and more elaborate claims in 2018 and 2019, which triggered a review by a firm specializing in the corroboration abuse allegations deemed Lindstrom's allegations as "not credible."

The paper reported, "...the Norbertines to contact[ed] Praesidium, a risk management firm focused on sexual abuse, and request[ing] an investigation. The Texas-based group had worked with dozens of organizations and Catholic dioceses and would later help the order compile its list of priests with credible abuse allegations against them."

The report noted that Praesidium, who helped corroborate the allegations surrounding the USA Gymnastics sex abuse scandal, deemed the allegations by the accuser, "not credible" and payments were stopped.

The Press-Gazette's reporter, Haylee Bemiller said, "Praesidium around that time noted the 'unusual nature' of Lindstrom's payments. Both the firm and Order's legal counsel recommended they should end."

Abbot Dane in his effort for reform and the protection of children committed to making sure the events of the past are not repeated. He said, "We know many are angry with the Church and our Norbertine community, and we hear your anger. It motivates us to be better Norbertines, living up to the higher standard of our call.

The Abbot added, "Our community believes that the protection of children is the highest priority. For the last two decades, we have worked towards rebuilding trust within the local community and acknowledging shortcomings."

== Sources ==
- Geudens, F. M., "St. Norbert", The Catholic Encyclopedia, New York: Robert Appleton Company
- National Shrine of St. Joseph (2008–2009), A Ministry of Devotion to St. Joseph
- Rossey, Stephen, O.Praem. (Spring 2009), "The Abbey by Design", Abbey Magazine, 1 (1): 5, archived from the original on 2012-07-30
- Rossey, Stephen (2025). The Liturgy in Stained Glass: The Windows of St. Norbert Abbey. De Pere, Wisconsin: St. Norbert Abbey Press. ISBN 979-8-218-38668-9.
- St. Norbert Abbey (2009), Our History, archived from the original on 2008-05-09
- St. Norbert Abbey (2009), Who We Are, archived from the original on 2008-05-11
- St. Norbert Abbey (1993), With the grace of God: on the occasion of the 100th anniversary of the origin of the De Pere Norbertines, Alt Publishing: Green Bay, Wisconsin, p. 87
