= PERI =

Manufacturer and supplier of formwork and scaffolding systems

PERI SE
- Company type: Societas Europaea
- Industry: Construction
- Founded: 1969
- Headquarters: Weißenhorn, Germany
- Area served: Worldwide
- Key people: Christian Schwörer (Chairman)
- Products: Formwork, Scaffolding, Engineering
- Revenue: ▲€ 1,847 million (2023)
- Number of employees: 9,200 (2023)
- Website: www.peri.com

PERI is a manufacturer and supplier of formwork and scaffolding systems founded in 1969 in Weißenhorn, Germany.

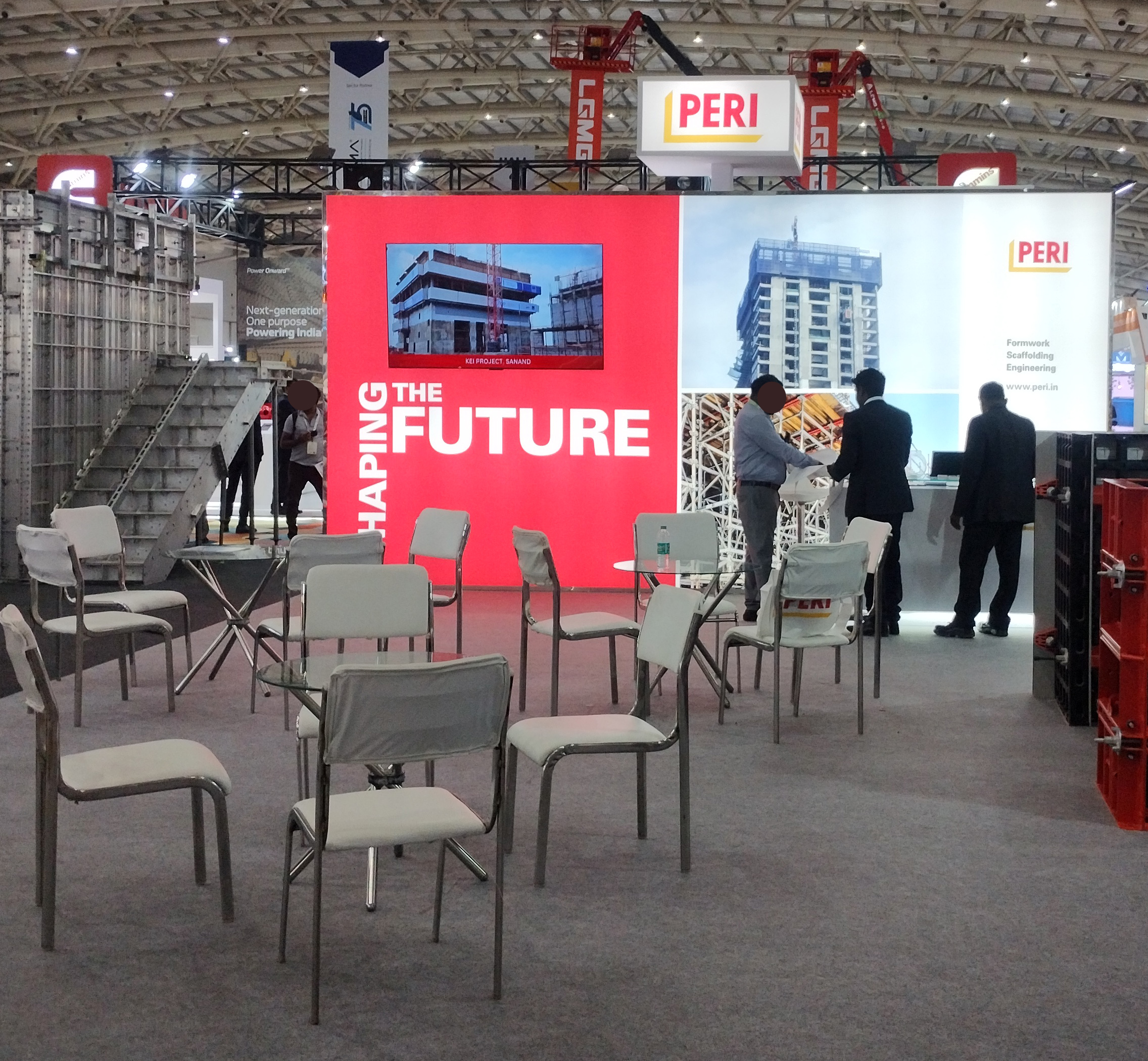
PERI at EXCON 2025, BIEC

== Etymology ==
The company's name is derived from the Greek preposition "peri", meaning around. It references the scaffold and concrete that surrounds and supports a building.

== History ==
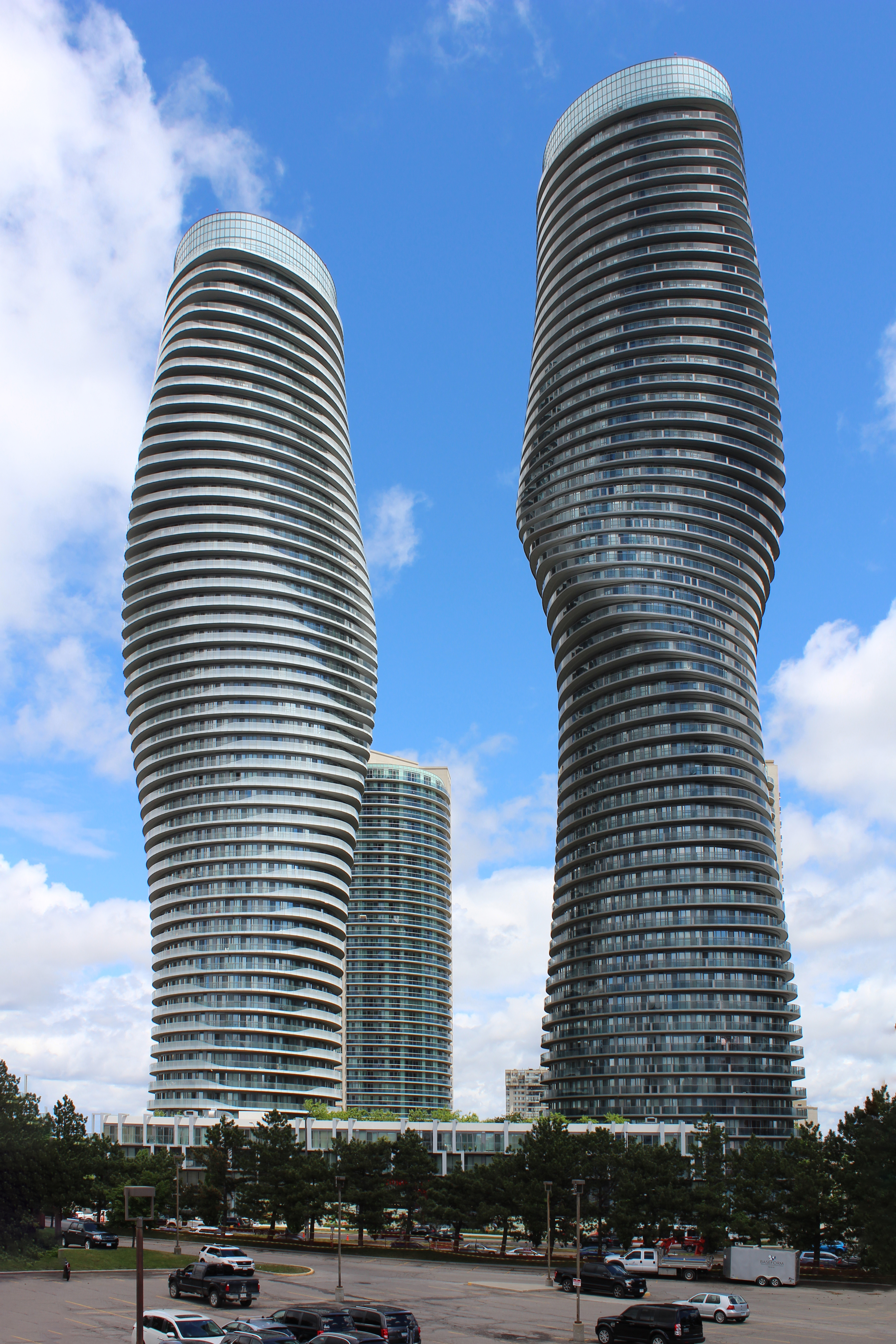
PERI made custom formwork for the construction of the Absolute World buildings

The company was founded in 1969 by Artur Schwörer and his wife Christl Schwörer in Weißenhorn, Germany. The company has developed techniques in formwork and scaffolding technology, and the use of aluminum and 3D printers in complex construction projects.

In 2014, Schaltec became part of the PERI group. Three years later the company opened the modern head plant for scaffolding systems in Günzburg, Germany. A galvanizing plant was acquired by the company in 2020.

== Products and services ==
The PERI product range can be divided into the following business segments: formwork, scaffolding, civil engineering, panel products, industrial scaffolding, components, services, and 3D construction printing.

== Projects ==
Due to a tight deadline, PERI's formwork technology was used in the construction of Cuatro Torres Highrise in 2008. From 2011 to 2014, 1,100 containers of PERI's innovative scaffolding and formwork technology was delivered and used in the expansion of the Panama Canal. A custom rail climbing system from PERI was used to build the Absolute World buildings in 2012. PERI's technology was used due to the incline of the buildings making it impossible for cranes to raise the scaffold.

In 2017, prefabricated tunnel elements for the Hong Kong–Zhuhai–Macau Bridge were built using PERI tools. Later that year the company constructed three pylons for the Mersey Gateway Bridge with the use of their rail climbing system. In 2018, the National Veterans Memorial and Museum building was completed using PERI formwork. In 2019, PERI's formwork was used to create Lakhta Center, the tallest building in Europe at the time.

== Controversy ==
In 2022, Peri Duo lost preliminary injunction proceedings against Geoplast in Italy. This resulted in the prohibition of production and distribution of Peri Duo formwork in Italy.
