= Windberg Abbey =

Premonstratensian monastery in Germany

Windberg Abbey (Kloster Windberg)
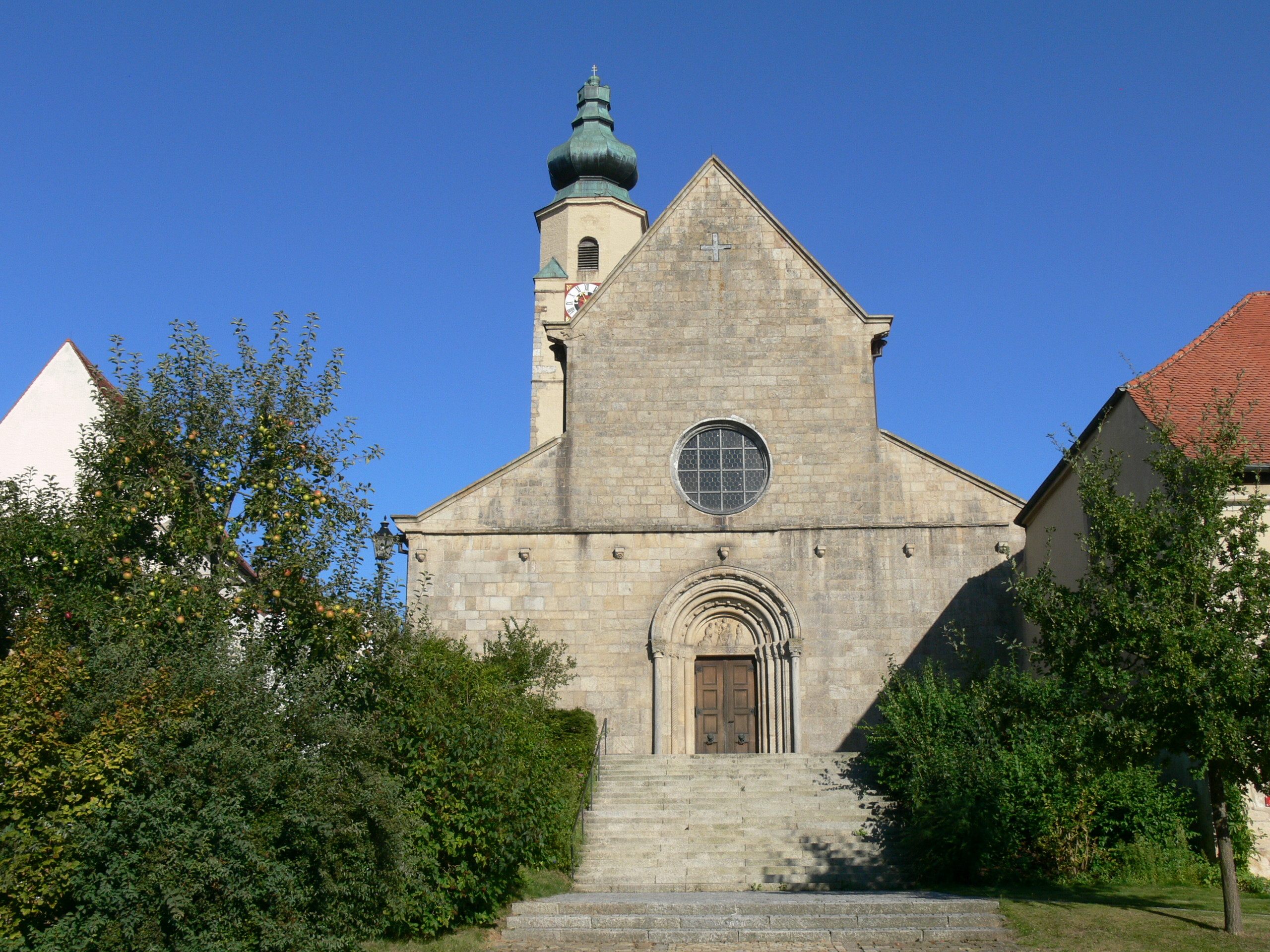
- West front of the abbey church

Religion
- Affiliation: Premonstratensian
- District: Lower Bavaria
- Year consecrated: 1167
- Status: Active

Location
- Location: Windberg, Germany
- Interactive map of Windberg Abbey (Kloster Windberg)
- Coordinates: 48.939722°N 12.746944°E

Architecture
- Type: Church
- Style: Romanesque

Windberg Abbey (German: Kloster Windberg) is a Premonstratensian monastery in Windberg in Lower Bavaria, Germany.

== History ==
=== First foundation ===
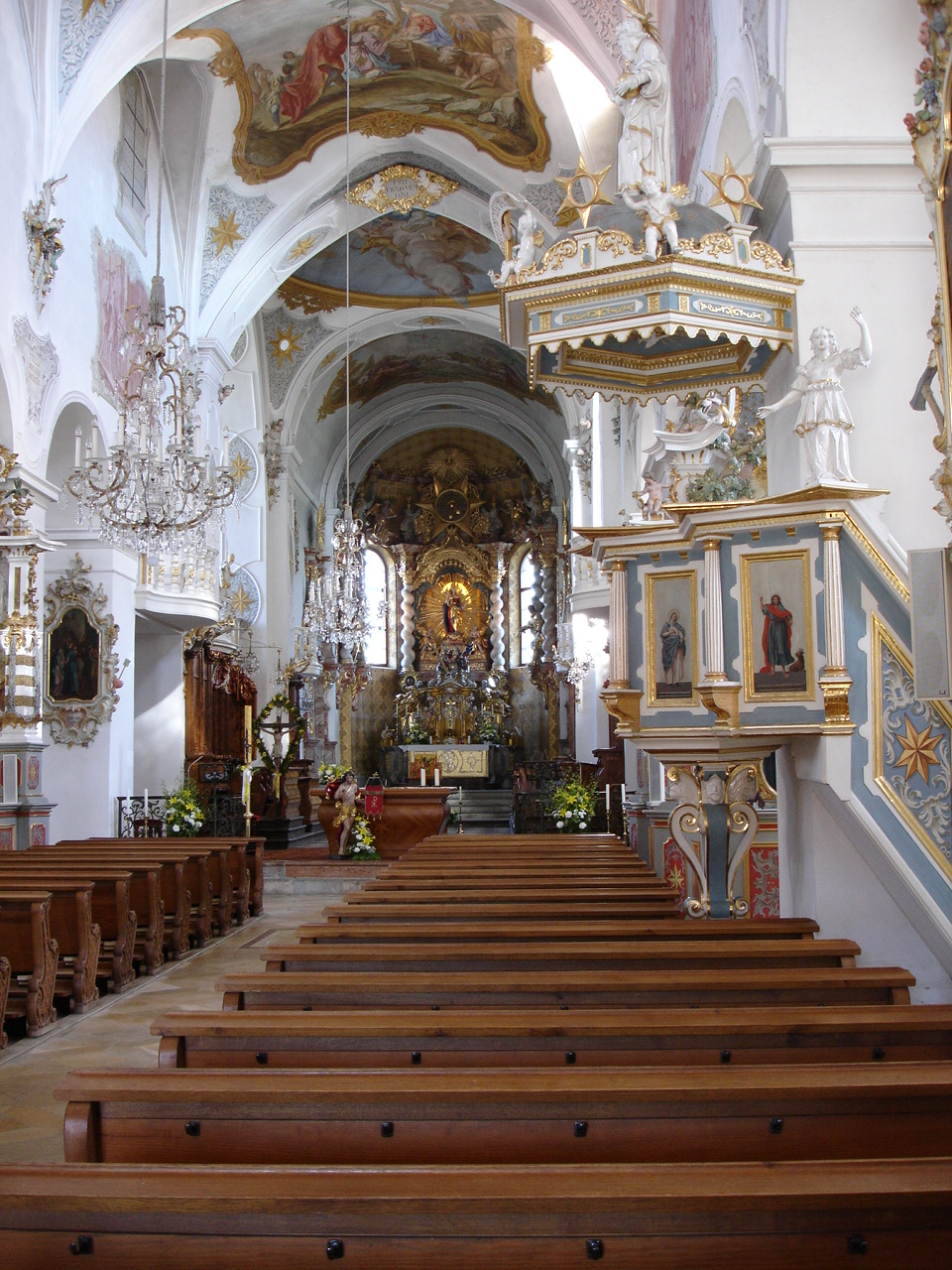
Interior of the former abbey church

Windberg Abbey was founded by Count Albert I of Bogen with the assistance of Bishop Otto of Bamberg on the site of the original seat of the Counts of Bogen. Initially it was not a specifically Premonstratensian foundation, but was transferred to the order as an already established community between 1121 and 1146. The choir of the church was dedicated on 21 and 22 May 1142 by Heinrich Zdik, Bishop of Olmütz, in the presence of Count Albert. Duke Vladislav II of Bohemia secured the endowment of the monastery by granting it the properties of Schüttenhofen (now Sušice) and Albrechtsried.

The foundation was dedicated in honour of the Virgin Mary and in 1146 raised to the status of an abbey. After the extension of the abbey church it was dedicated on 28 November 1167 by the Premonstratensian abbot of Leitomischl (now Litomyšl) and Johannes IV, bishop of Olmütz.

The abbey was secularised and dissolved during the secularisation of Bavaria in 1803. The church became a parish church and the abbot's house the residence of the parish clergy. The monastic buildings passed into private ownership, and from 1835 were used for a brewery.

=== Second foundation ===
In 1923 the monastic community was re-established here by Premonstratensians from Berne-Heeswijk Abbey in the Netherlands. As of 2005, 33 Premonstratensian canons live in Windberg.

Roggenburg Priory near Neu-Ulm is a priory of Windberg Abbey.

In around 1955, the then abbot, Fr. Norbert Backmund, visited Beeleigh Abbey near Maldon in Essex, England, and was hosted by its owner Mr William Foyle, founder and owner of Foyles Bookshop. Beeleigh Abbey had been a Premonstratensian abbey founded in 1180 and dissolved by Henry VIII in 1536. This was the first visit to Beeleigh Abbey by a Premonstratensian abbot since the Dissolution of the Monasteries.

== The abbey church ==
The church is a three-aisled basilica with transept. It mostly originates from the 12th century and shows the influence of Hirsau Abbey. The monumental chief portal is especially impressive; the north portal is somewhat simpler. The tower, built in the 13th century, received its present form as recently as 1750 - 1760.

The Baroque high altar was made between 1735 and 1740, and contains a statue of the Virgin from about 1650. The pulpit dates from 1674. The stucco work in the church interior was created by Mathias Obermayr, who also made the four extremely detailed side-altars, two of which are dated 1756.

== Sources and references ==
- Prämonstratenser-Abtei Windberg, ISBN 3-89870-072-0
- Die Kunstdenkmäler von Niederbayern, vol. XX: Bezirksamt Bogen, p. 440. Munich, 1929
- Backmund, Norbert, 1966. Die Chorherrenorden und ihre Stifte in Bayern. Augustinerchorherren, Prämonstratenser, Chorherren v. Hl. Geist, Antoniter. Mit einem Beitrag von Adalbert Mischlewski: Die Niederlassungen des Antoniterordens in Bayern, p. 2. Passau.
