= Hierden =

- Village
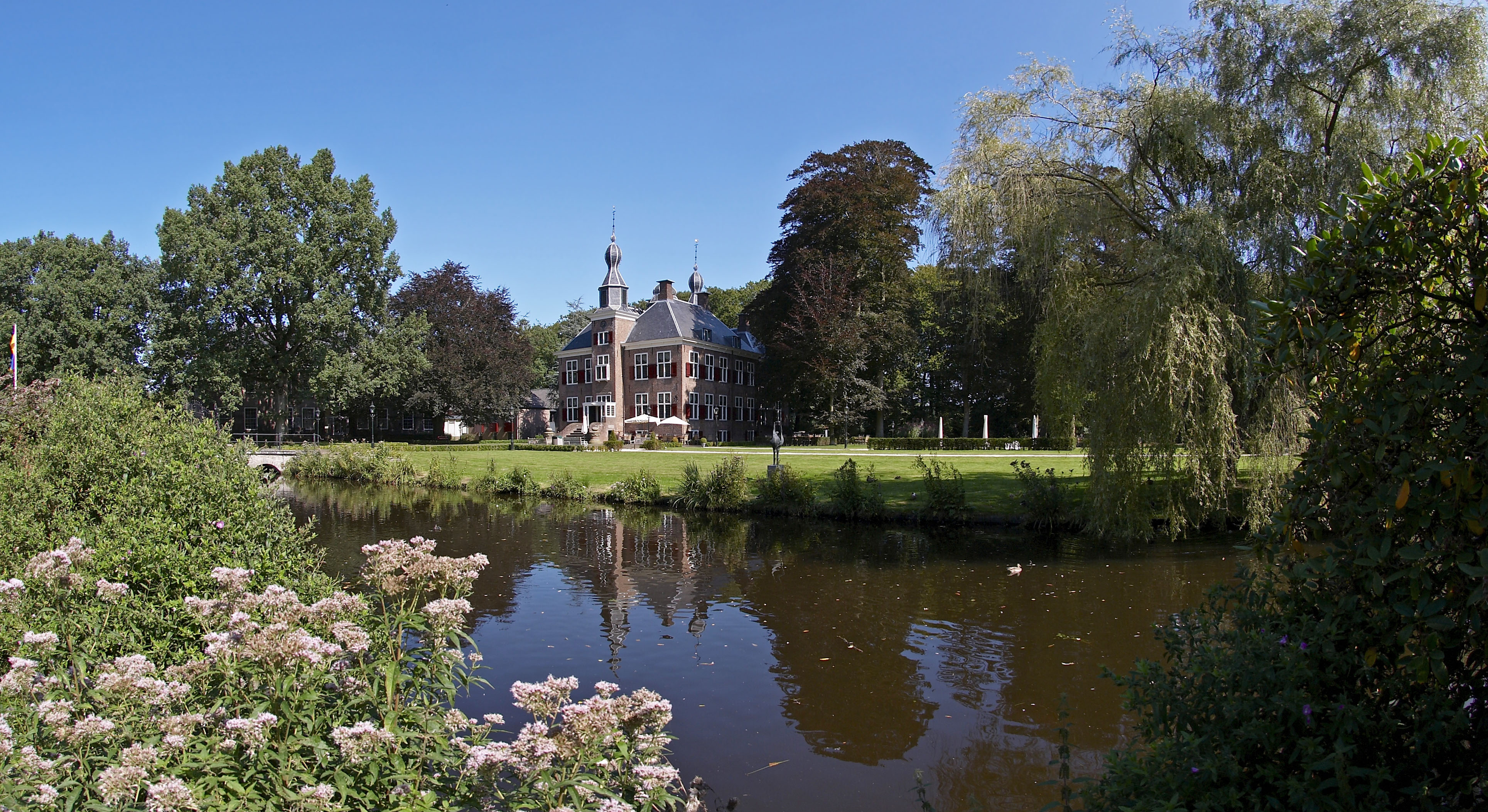
- Estate Essenburgh

- Location in the Netherlands Hierden (Netherlands)
- Coordinates: 52°21′21″N 5°40′34″E
- Country: Netherlands
- Province: Gelderland
- Municipality: Harderwijk

Area
  - Total: 9.36 km^{2} (3.61 sq mi)
- Elevation: 4 m (13 ft)

Population (2021)
  - Total: 3,240
  - Density: 346/km^{2} (897/sq mi)
- Time zone: UTC+1 (CET)
  - Summer (DST): UTC+2 (CEST)
- Postal code: 3849
- Dialing code: 0341

Hierden is a farming village in the centre-east of Netherlands. It is located in the municipality of Harderwijk, Gelderland.

It was first mentioned 1331 as Heyrde and means "solid underground". The first church was built in the 17th century. The current church dates from 1880. Groot Essenburg is a manor house which was built in 1652 and modified in 1767 and 1929. In 1840, it was home to 957 people.

== Gallery ==
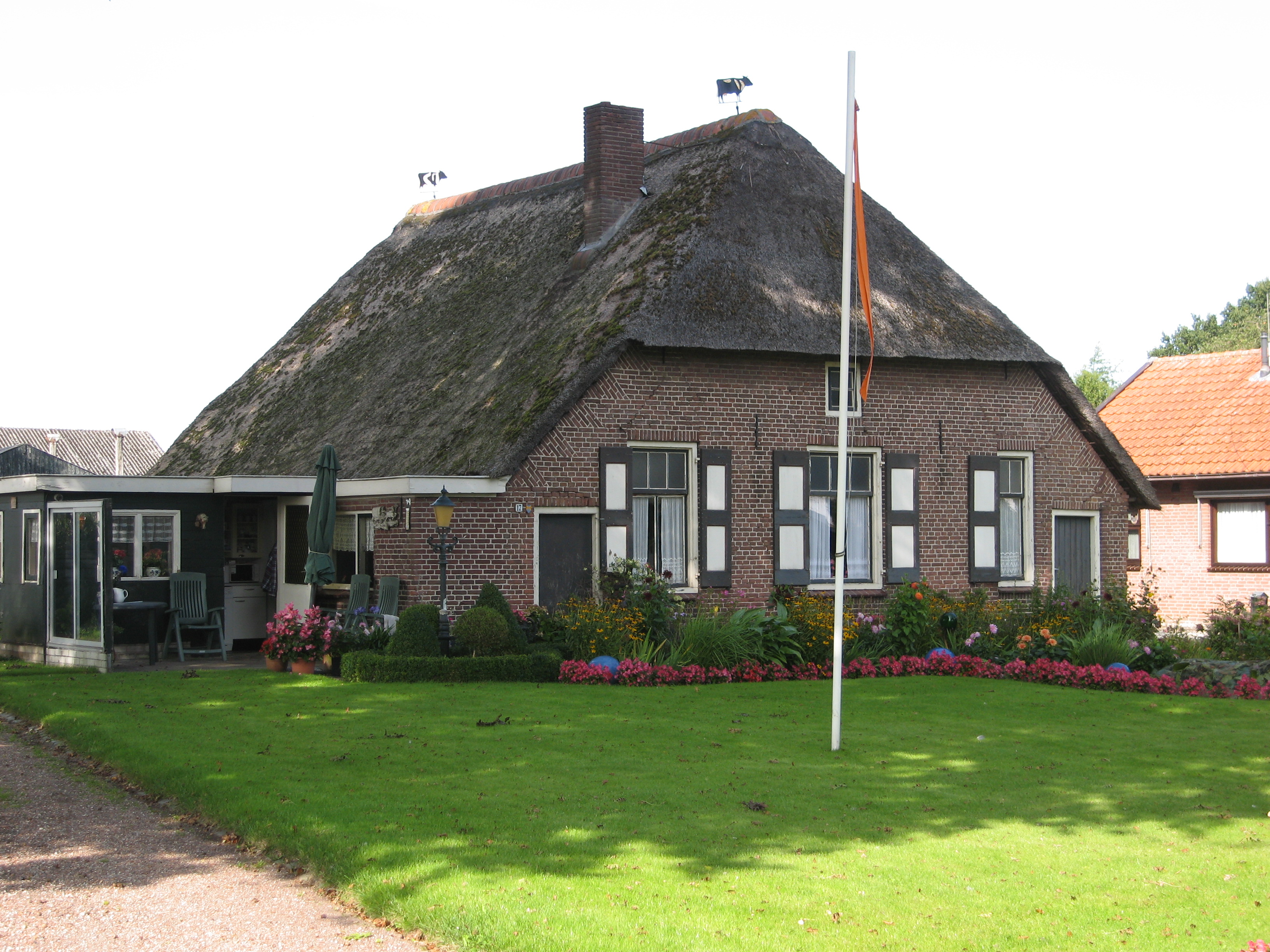
Farm in Hierden

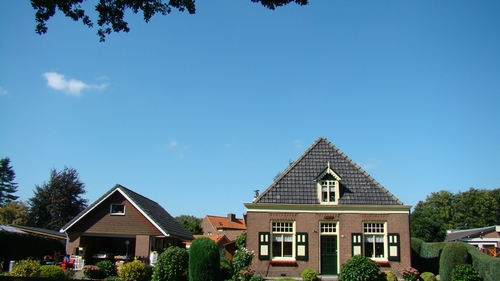
Farm in Hierden
