= Roggenburg Abbey =

Coordinates: 48°16′28.7″N 10°13′41.1″E

Imperial Abbey of Roggenburg Reichsstift Roggenburg
- 1482–1802
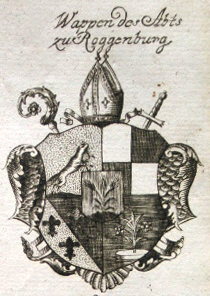
- Coat of arms
- Status: Imperial Abbey
- Capital: Roggenburg
- Government: Elective principality
- Historical era: Middle Ages
  - Founded: 1126
  - Gained Reichsfreiheit: 1482
  - Secularised to Bavaria: 1802
Preceded by	Succeeded by
Margraviate of Burgau / Margraviate of Burgau	Electorate of Bavaria

Roggenburg Abbey (Kloster Roggenburg or Reichsstift Roggenburg) is a Premonstratensian canonry in Roggenburg near Neu-Ulm, Bavaria, in operation between 1126 and 1802, and again from its re-foundation in 1986. Since 1992 it has been a dependent priory of Windberg Abbey in Lower Bavaria (Roggenburg Priory). The monastery manages a training centre and a museum, and is widely known for its almost unchanged Baroque building and the organ concerts that are held in the church.

For over three centuries Roggenburg was one of the 40-odd self-ruling imperial abbeys of the Holy Roman Empire and, as such, was a virtually independent state. Its abbot had seat and voice at the Imperial Diet where he sat on the Bench of the Prelates of Swabia. At the time of the abbey's dissolution in 1802, its territory covered 112 square kilometers and it had 3,300-5,000 subjects.

== History ==
=== First foundation ===
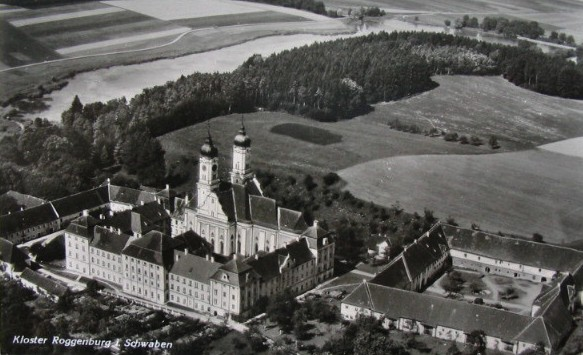
Roggenburg Abbey seen from the air

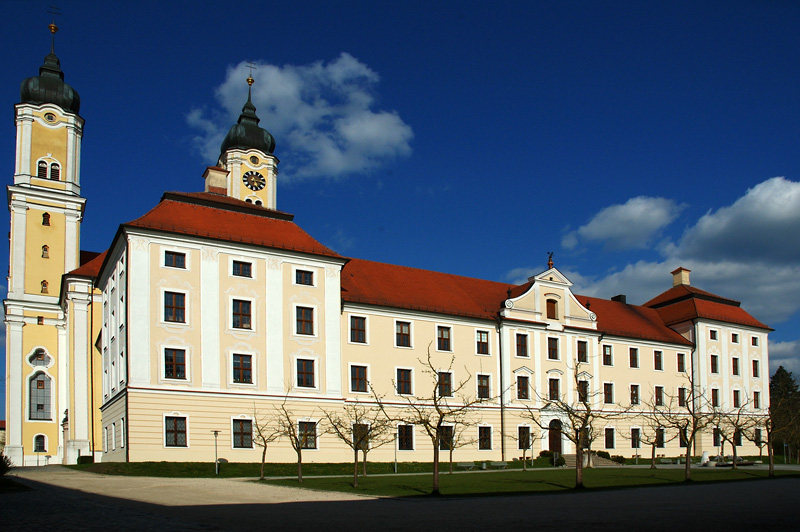
Roggenburg Abbey, Baroque building

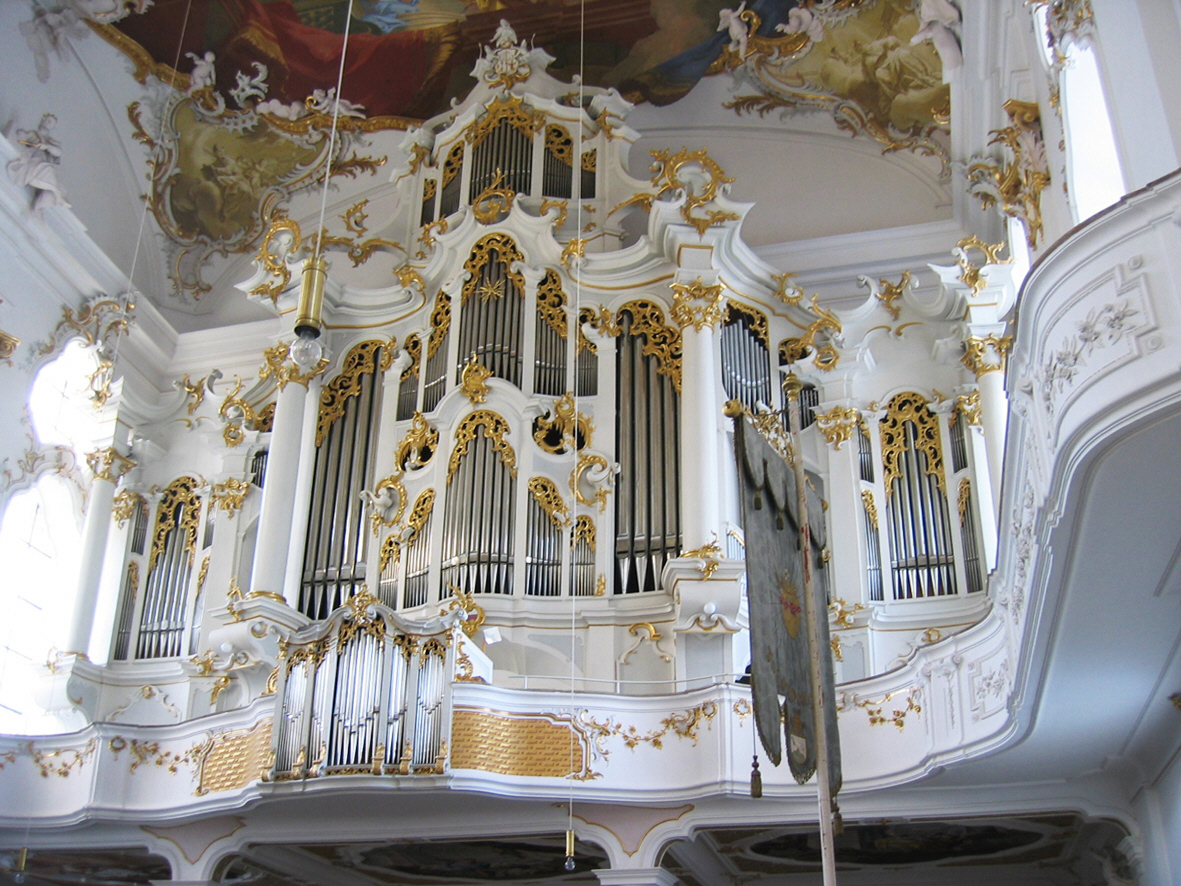
Organ, originally by Schmahl

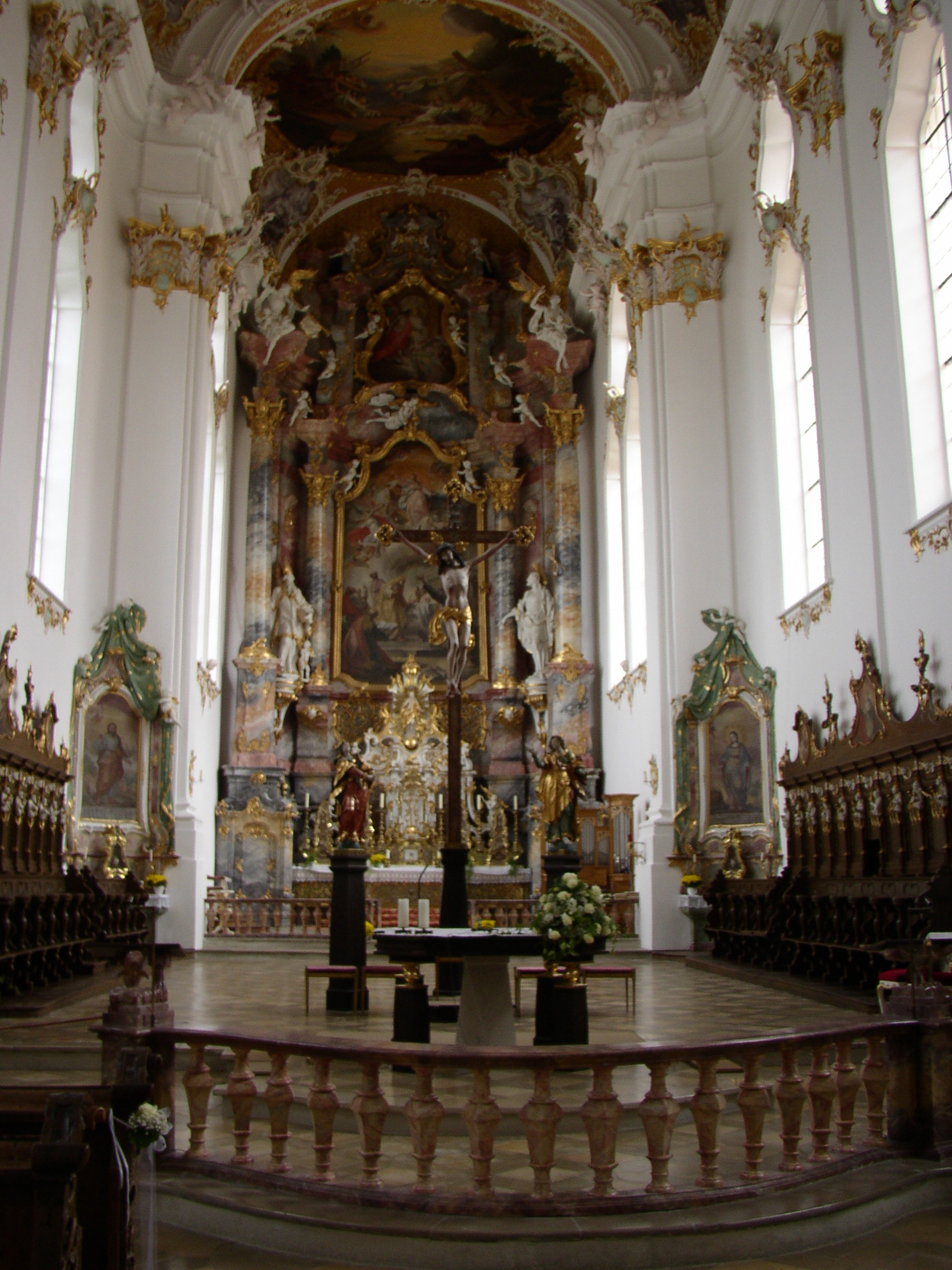
Quire, Roggenburg Abbey church

In 1126 Count Bertold of Bibereck, together with his wife and his two brothers, Konrad, Bishop of Chur, and Siegfried, a canon in the diocese of Augsburg, founded the monastery. The first Premonstratensian canons came from Ursberg Abbey nearby and built the first monastery church.

In 1444 the foundation was raised to the status of an abbey. The first description of Roggenburg Abbey as reichsunmittelbar dates from 1482/5; the legal consolidation of this status took place in tiny stages over the first half of the 16th century.

In the 18th century the abbey and its dependent churches were rebuilt in the Baroque style, as they are today. The conventual buildings were rebuilt in 1732. Construction of a new church began in 1752, and lasted six years.

In 1802 the monastery was occupied by Bavarian troops during the secularisation of Bavaria, dissolved, and the last abbot, Thaddäus Aigler, stripped of his office.

==== After dissolution ====
The abbey church became a parish church. The rest of the abbey's property passed into private ownership, except for the buildings, which were taken over by the Bavarian government. Until 1862 a district court and rent office were accommodated here. Later the buildings were used for a variety of functions, including as a school, a forestry office and a parochial office.

=== Second foundation ===
In 1986 Premonstratensians again occupied the premises. On 8 November 1992 the new community was raised to the status of an independent priory of Windberg Abbey. In the interval there had arisen a training centre for family, environment and culture, a museum and a centre for art and culture, as well as gastronomical facilities. In addition, the monastery shop sells devotional items, the monastery's own wine and various other products of their own manufacture.

== Abbey church ==
The Baroque abbey church was built between 1752 and 1758 to plans by Simpert Kraemer in the shape of a cross. The hall church, with extended transept and double towers, is 70 metres long, 35 metres across and has an inside height, to the highest point, of 28 metres. It is used as the Roman Catholic parish church of the Ascension of the Virgin Mary.

=== Organ ===
The great Baroque organ by the Ulm organ builder Georg Friedrich Schmahl of 1761 was completely replaced in 1905 by a Late Romantic construction by the Gebrüder Hindelang of Ebenhofen. This was replaced in its turn in 1955–56, with the reuse of some registers, by an instrument by the Familie Nenninger. In 1984–86 it was extensively rebuilt by Gerhard Schmid of Kaufbeuren. The appearance of the organ by Schmahl was preserved throughout all rebuildings.

Stoplist

I Rückpositiv C–g^{3}
Copel	8’
Quintatön	8’
Praestant	4’
Flauto amabile	4’
Spitzquinte	2^{2}/_{3}’
Schwiegel	2’
Terz	1^{3}/_{5}’
Sifflöte	1^{1}/_{3}’
Scharff III	1’
Dulcian	8’
Tremulant

II Hauptwerk C–g^{3}
Praestant	16’
Principal	8’
Gedackt	8’
Gamba	8’
Großquinte	5^{1}/_{3}’
Octav	4’
Rohrflöte	4’
Großterz	3^{1}/_{5}’
Quinte	2^{2}/_{3}’
Octave	2’
Mixtur IV	1^{1}/_{3}’
Trompete	8’

III Schwellwerk C–g^{3}
Bourdon	16’
Principal	8’
Holzflöte	8’
Salicional	8’
Schwebung	8’
Octav	4’
Flöte	4’
Nasat	2^{2}/_{3}’
Blockflöte	2’
Terz	1^{3}/_{5}’
Piccolo	1’
Plein jeu IV	2’
Fagott	16’
Oboe	8’
Tremulant

IV Oberwerk C–g^{3}
Flûte harmonique	8’
Geigenprincipal	4’
Traversflöte	4’
Nachthorn	2’
Kornett III	2^{2}/_{3}’
Solotrompete	8’
Tremulant
Trumpets
Tuba magna	16’
Tuba imperialis	8’
Clairon prémontre	4’

IV Fernwerk C–g^{3} (Choir Organ)
Gedackt	8’
Quintade	8’
Flöte	4’
Ital. Principal	2’

V Unterwerk C–g^{3}
Bourdon	8’
Principal	4’
Mixtur IV	2^{2}/_{3}’
Tromba	8’
Clarine	4’

Pedal C–f^{1}
Principal	16’
Subbass	16’
Quintbass	10^{2}/_{3}’
Octavbass	8’
Cello	8’
Flötbass	4’
Bombarde	32’
Posaune	16’
Trompetbass	8’

Pedal C–f^{1} (Choir Organ)
Rankett	16’
Untersatz II	16' + 8’
Choraloktav	4’

- Couplers: I/Ped. II/Ped., III/Ped., III/Ped. 4’, IV/Ped., V/Ped., III/I, I/II, III/II, III/II 16’, IV/II, V/II, V/III, IV/III, III / III 16’

== Bibliography ==
- Groll, Elisabeth, 1944: Das Prämonstratenserstift Roggenburg im Beginn der Neuzeit (1450–1600). Augsburg (also a dissertation, Ludwig-Maximilians-Universität München 1939)
- Hadry, Sarah: Klosterregiment am Ende des Mittelalters: Die „Innenpolitik“ des Reichsstifts Roggenburg. In: Jahrbuch des Historischen Vereins Dillingen an der Donau, 106. Jahrgang 2005, pp. 57–86
- Probst, Michael, c. 1989: Carmen epicum de morte Sifridi (Latin/German edition as: Kloster Roggenburg. Das Lied seiner Gründung und seiner Stifterfamilie. Translated by Hans Wieland. Konrad: Weissenhorn. ISBN 3-87437-291-X)
- Ratte, Franz Josef, 1990: Die Orgel im Prämonstratenserkloster Roggenburg und ihr Erbauer Georg Friedrich Schmahl. In: Orgelkunst und Orgelforschung, pp. 113–127
- Stankowski, Martin, 2003: Land-Kloster — Kloster-Landschaft 1650–1800. Über das Bauen in Roggenburg und in Ost- und Oberschwaben. Fink: Lindenberg. ISBN 3-89870-134-4
- Tuscher, Franz, 1991: Das Reichsstift Roggenburg im 18. Jahrhundert. 2nd, improved edition. Konrad: Weissenhorn. ISBN 3-87437-315-0
