= Windberg =

- Municipality
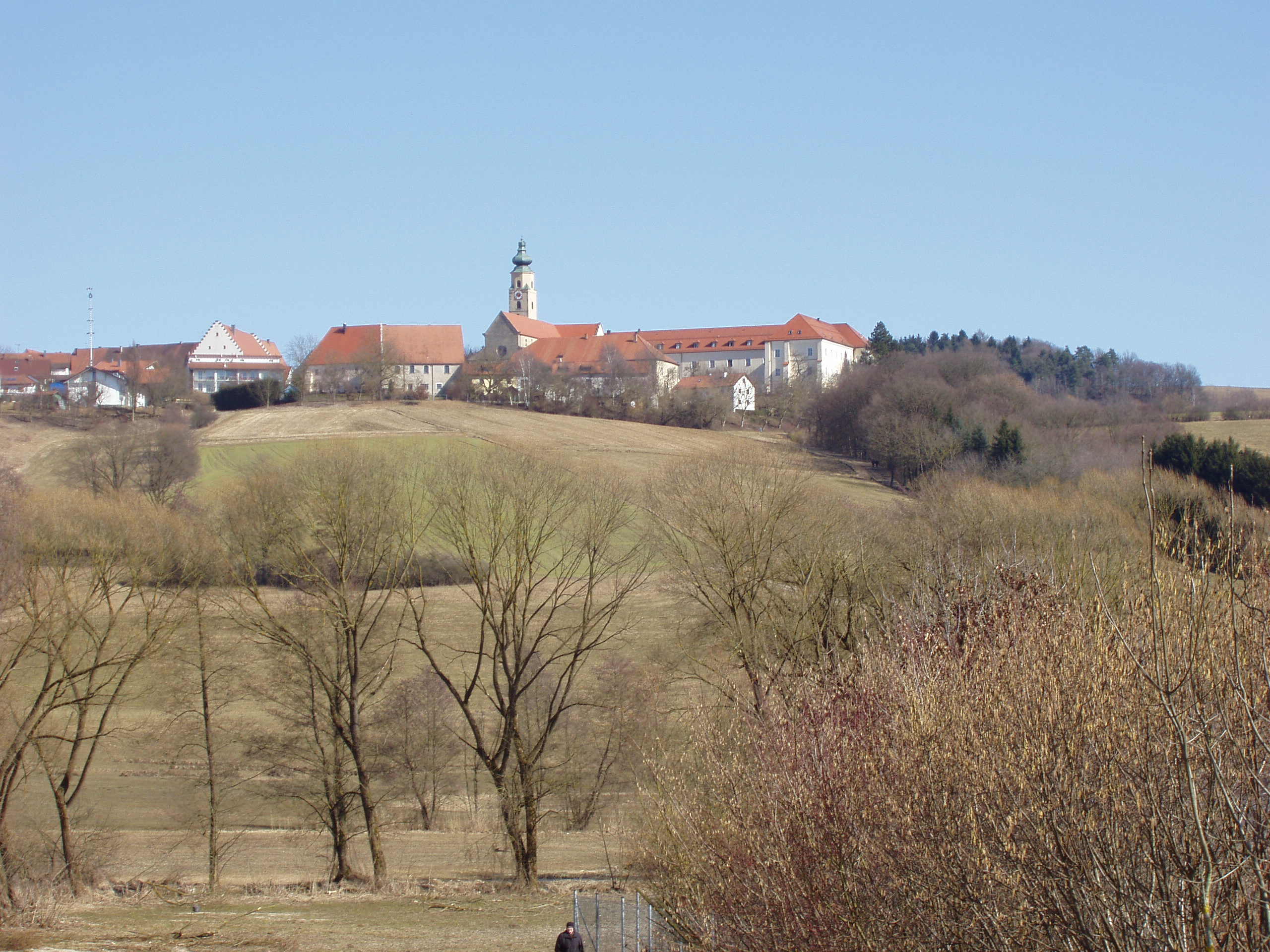
- Windberg Abbey

- Coat of arms

- Location of Windberg within Straubing-Bogen district
- Interactive map of Windberg
- Location within Germany Location within Bavaria
- Coordinates: 48°57′N 12°45′E
- Country: Germany
- State: Bavaria
- Admin. region: Niederbayern
- District: Straubing-Bogen
- Municipal assoc.: Hunderdorf

Government
  - Mayor (2020–26): Helmut Haimerl

Area
  - Total: 7.97 km^{2} (3.08 sq mi)
- Elevation: 400 m (1,300 ft)

Population (2025-12-31)
  - Total: 1,012
  - Density: 127/km^{2} (329/sq mi)
- Time zone: UTC+01:00 (CET)
  - Summer (DST): UTC+02:00 (CEST)
- Postal codes: 94336
- Dialling codes: 09422
- Vehicle registration: SR
- Website: www.windberg.de

Windberg (German pronunciation: [ˈvɪntbɛʁk]) is a municipality in the district of Straubing-Bogen in Bavaria, Germany.
