= Roggenburg, Bavaria =

Roggenburg
- Municipality
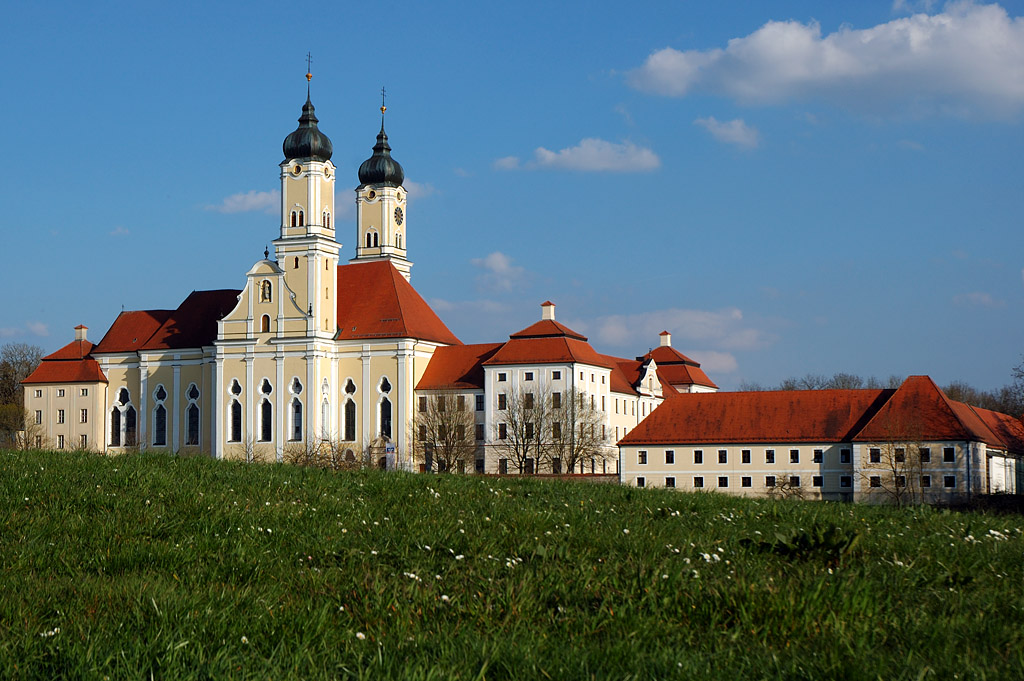
- Roggenburg Abbey

- Coat of arms

- Location of Roggenburg within Neu-Ulm district
- Interactive map of Roggenburg
- Location within Germany Location within Bavaria
- Coordinates: 48°16′N 10°13′E
- Country: Germany
- State: Bavaria
- Admin. region: Schwaben
- District: Neu-Ulm

Government
  - Mayor (2020–26): Mathias Stölzle

Area
  - Total: 27.43 km^{2} (10.59 sq mi)
- Elevation: 512 m (1,680 ft)

Population (2025-12-31)
  - Total: 2,747
  - Density: 100.1/km^{2} (259.4/sq mi)
- Time zone: UTC+01:00 (CET)
  - Summer (DST): UTC+02:00 (CEST)
- Postal codes: 89297
- Dialling codes: 07300
- Vehicle registration: NU
- Website: www.roggenburg.de

Roggenburg (German pronunciation: [ˈʁɔɡn̩ˌbʊʁk]) is a municipality in the district of Neu-Ulm in Bavaria in Germany.

Roggenburg is known for the Roggenburg Abbey, which is used today by the Premonstratensians. An environment and culture center with an overregional commuting area is located near the abbey.

== Geographical location ==
The municipality lies in the region "Donau-Iller" in central Swabia, approximately 30 km southeast of Ulm and 40 km north of Memmingen. The districts Roggenburg, Biberach and Meßhofen are located on the Biber river, the districts Ingstetten, Schießen and Unteregg at Osterbach, while Schleebuch is located between these two rivers.

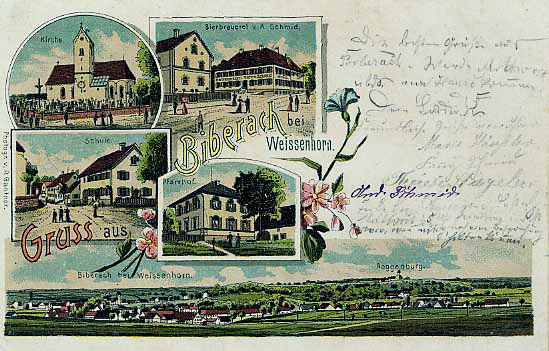
Biberach around 1900

== Politics ==
The municipal council has 14 members plus the major.

	ÜWV Schießen	FW Meßhofen/Roggenburg	WG Biberach	WG Ingstetten	Total
2002	5	3	4	2	14 seats
