= Engelmeyer =

Engelmeyer is a German surname, variant of Engelmeier. Notable people with the surname include:

- George Engelmeyer, an early founder of Alamo, California
- Pyotr Engelmeyer (1855–1942), Russian engineer of German descent

== See also ==
- Engel, Engelen Van Engelen, Engelman, Engelmann, Engelmayer, Engelmeyer, Engelmeier, Engeln, Engels, Engelsman, Engle, Engleman
