= Engelmayer =

Engelmayer is a surname. Notable people with the surname include:

- Paul A. Engelmayer (born 1961), American judge
- Shammai Engelmayer (born 1945), American rabbi

== See also ==
- Tobias Englmaier (born 1988), German judoka
- Engel, Engelen Van Engelen, Engelman, Engelmann, Engelmayer, Engelmeyer, Engelmeier, Engeln, Engels, Engelsman, Engle, Engleman
