= Engelke =

Engelke (North German: from a pet form of Engel) is a German language habitational surname for someone from Anglia. Notable people with the name include:

- Anke Engelke (born 1965), German comedian, actress, voice actress and television presenter
- David Engelke, American entrepreneur
- Helge Engelke (1961–2023), German guitar player, composer, and producer
- Horst Dieter Engelke (fl. 1960s), former West German slalom canoeist
- Justin Engelke (born 1976), former South African cricketer
- Kai Engelke (1946–2025), German writer, music journalist, reciter, singer-songwriter and teacher
- Matthew Engelke (born 1972), American anthropologist and author specializing in religion, media, public culture, secularism, and humanism

== See also ==
- Gerrit-Engelke-Preis
- Engelkes
- Engl (surname)
- Engl (disambiguation)
- Engel (surname)
- Engels (surname)
- Engelman
- Engelmann
