= Engelkes =

Engelkes (North German and Dutch: patronymic from Engelke) is a German language habitational surname for someone from Anglia. Notable people with the name include:

- Ed Engelkes (born 1964), Dutch football manager
- Heiko Engelkes (1933–2008), German journalist

== See also ==
- Engl (surname)
- Engl (disambiguation)
- Engel (surname)
- Engels (surname)
- Engelman
- Engelmann
- Engelke
