= Engl (surname) =

Engl is a German language habitational surname for someone from Anglia. Notable people with the name include:

- Birgit Engl (born 1979), Austrian handball player
- Heinz Engl (1953), Austrian mathematician
- Josef Benedikt Engl (1867–1907), German caricaturist and illustrator
- Kurt Engl (born 1979), Austrian alpine skier
- Maximilian Engl (1997), German professional footballer
- Olga Engl (1871–1946), Austrian-German stage and motion picture actress

== See also ==
- Engl (disambiguation)
- Engel (surname)
- Engels (surname)
- Engelman
- Engelmann
