= Engel (surname) =

Engel is a German surname. Notable people with the surname include:

- Adam Engel (born 1991), American baseball player
- Albert J. Engel (1888–1959), American Representative from Michigan
- Albert J. Engel Jr. (1924–2013), American jurist
- Andreas Engel (1943–2026), Swiss structural biologist
- Andreas K. Engel (born 1961), German neuroscientist
- Antke Engel (born 1965), German philosopher and publicist
- Barbara Engel (born 1952), German fashion designer
- Carl Engel (1883–1944), French-born American composer
- Carl Engel (musicologist) (1818–1882), German-born English writer on music
- Carl Ludvig Engel (1778–1840), German-born Estonian/Finnish architect
- Charles Engel, American economist
- David Engel (actor), Broadway singer, dancer, and actor
- David Engel (historian), American Holocaust historian
- David Hermann Engel (1816–1877), German organist and composer
- Eliot Engel, American Representative from New York
- Elliot Engel, American writer and lecturer
- Erich Engel (1891–1966), German actor
- Ernst Engel (1821–1896), German statistician and economist
- Franz Engel (1834–1920), German explorer
- Friedrich Engel (mathematician) (1861–1941), German mathematician
- Friedrich Engel (SS officer) (1909–2006), German Schutzstaffel officer
- Georgia Engel (1948–2019), American film and television actress
- Gerhard Engel (1906–1976), German Generalleutnant and State Commissioner of the Society for Military Customer
- Greg Engel (born 1971), American football player
- Johann Christian von Engel (1770–1814), Hungarian historian
- Karl Dietrich Leonhard Engel (1824–1913), German musician and writer
- Heinfried Engel (born 1947), German pole vaulter
- Howard Engel (1931–2019), Canadian mystery writer and producer
- Jerzy Engel (born 1952), former Polish football manager
- Joel Engel (composer) (1868–1927), Russian-born Jewish composer
- Joel S. Engel (born 1936), American engineer and scientist
- Johann Jakob Engel (1741–1802), German philosophical writer
- Josef Engel (born 1942), Czech wrestler
- Josef Engel (anatomist) (1816–1899), German anatomist
- Jules Engel (1909–2003), American filmmaker, artist
- Julius Engel (1842–1926), German judge and politician
- Justin Engel (born 2007), German tennis player
- Karl Engel (1923–2006), Swiss pianist
- Karl Engel (footballer) (born 1952), Swiss football goalkeeper
- Karl Dietrich Leonhard Engel (1824–1913), German composer and writer
- Kurt Engel (1909–1942), Austrian pianist
- L. Patrick Engel (1932–2022), American politician
- Lehman Engel (1910–1982), American composer and conductor
- Marian Engel (1933–1985), Canadian novelist
- Maro Engel (born 1985), German auto racing driver
- Matthew Engel (born 1951), English writer, especially on cricket
- Michael S. Engel (born 1971), US paleontologist and entomologist
- Natascha Engel (born 1967), former British Member of Parliament
- Pál Engel (1938–2001), Hungarian historian
- Pascal Engel (born 1954), French philosopher
- Dame Pauline Engel (1930–2017), New Zealand nun and educator
- Peter Engel (1936–2025), American television producer
- Peter Engel (author) (born 1959), American origami artist and theorist, science writer, graphic designer, and architect
- Richard Engel (born 1973), American television journalist and author
- Roy Engel (1913–1980), American actor
- Royan Engel (born 1943/1944), American businesswoman
- S. Morris Engel (born 1931), author, philosopher, and linguist
- Scott Walker (singer) (1943–2019), American-born British singer and musician born Noel Scott Engel
- Stephen Engel (fl. 1990s–2010s), American TV producer and writer
- Stephen M. Engel (fl. 1990s–2010s), American academic and political scientist
- Steve Engel (born 1961), American baseball player
- Steven Engel (born 1974), American lawyer and former Justice Department official
- Thomas M. Engel (born 1953), Canadian lawyer
- Volker Engel (born 1965), German-born American visual effects artist

== See also ==
- Admiral Engel (disambiguation)
- Senator Engel (disambiguation)
- Engel, Engelen, Van Engelen, Engelman, Engelmann, Engelmayer, Engelmeyer, Engelmeier, Engeln, Engels, Engelsman, Engle, Engleman
