= Engels (disambiguation) =

Friedrich Engels (1820–1895) was a German communist, social scientist and philosopher.

Engels may also refer to:

== People ==
- Engels (surname), a German and Dutch patronymic surname
- Engels Gabbasov (1937–2014), Kazakh politician and writer
- Engels Kozlov (1926–2007), Soviet Russian painter
- Engels Pedroza (born 1966), Venezuelan former boxer

== Other uses ==
- Engels (inhabited locality), several localities in Russia
- Engels Peak, Tajikistan
- Engels constituency, a Russian legislative constituency in the Saratov Oblast
- Engels, Saratov Oblast
  - Engels Air Force Base, formerly Engels-2 (air base), a strategic bomber military airbase near Saratov, Russia
- Engels MI, a Russian floatplane/fighter developed in 1916
- Engels Teater, a historic theatre in Helsinki in Finland, active from 1827 to 1860
- Engels Copper Mine, a former mine in Plumas County, California

== See also ==
- Engle (disambiguation)
- Engel (disambiguation)
- Engels Maps
- English language (Dutch: Engels)
