= Van Engelen =

Van Engelen is a Dutch toponymic surname, meaning "from Engelen". Notable people with the surname include:

- Anthony Van Engelen (born 1978), American skateboarder
- Ton van Engelen (born 1950), Dutch footballer
- Yvo van Engelen (born 1985), Dutch footballer

== See also ==
- Engel, Engelen Van Engelen, Engelman, Engelmann, Engelmeier, Engeln, Engels, Engelsman, Engle, Engleman
