= Engle =

Engle may refer to:

== Places in the United States ==
- Engle, New Mexico, an unincorporated community
- Engle, Texas, an unincorporated community
- Engle, West Virginia, an unincorporated community
- Engle Lake, a seasonal lake in New Mexico
- Engle Peak, a mountain in Montana

== Other uses ==
- Engle (surname)
- Fred S. Engle Middle School, West Grove, Pennsylvania, United States
- Engle, Old English for the Angles, a people who settled in Great Britain after the fall of the Western Roman Empire

== See also ==
- Engels (disambiguation)
- Engel (disambiguation)
