= Engel =

Engel means "angel" in some Germanic languages.

Engel or Die Engel may refer to:

== People ==
- Engel (surname)
- Engel Beltré (born 1989), Dominican baseball player
- Engel Modderman (born 1951), Dutch politician

== Music ==
- Engel (band), a Swedish industrial/melodic death metal band
- "Engel" (song), a 1997 song by Rammstein
- "Engel", a 2014 song by Admiral P featuring Nico D
- "Engel", a 2012 song from the album Raise Your Fist by Doro

== Others uses ==
- Engel (role-playing game), published in 2002
- Frau Engel, a character in the Wolfenstein video game series
- Marian Engle Award, a Canadian literary award presented annually from 1986 to 2007
- Engel Stadium, a baseball stadium in Chattanooga, Tennessee, United States
- De Engel (Lisse), a community in the municipality of Lisse, South Holland, the Netherlands
- De Engel (restaurant), Rotterdam, the Netherlands

== See also ==
- Engle (disambiguation)
- Engels (disambiguation)
- Engel v. Vitale, U.S. Supreme Court decision (1962)
