= Thomas Engel =

Thomas Engel may refer to:

- Thomas Engel (rower), New Zealand rower
- Thomas Engel (director), German screenwriter and director
- Thomas M. Engel, Canadian lawyer
