= Engelmann =

Engelmann may refer to:

- Engelmann (surname)
- Engelmann oak, also called Pasadena Oak
- Engelmann spruce, a medium-sized evergreen tree
- Engelmann syndrome, a rare autosomal dominant genetic disorder

== See also ==
- Engelman
