= Peter Engel (disambiguation) =

Peter Engel (1936–2025) was an American television producer.

Peter Engel may also refer to:

- Peter Engel (author) (born 1959), American origami artist

== See also ==
- Peter Engle
- Peter Engels, physics professor
