= 1975–76 PSV Eindhoven season =

PSV Eindhoven
1975–76 season
- Manager: Kees Rijvers
- Stadium: Philips Stadion
- Eredivisie: 1st
- KNVB Cup: Winners
- European Cup: Semi-finals
- Top goalscorer: League: Willy van der Kuijlen (27); All: Willy van der Kuijlen (41)

During the 1975–76 Dutch football season, PSV Eindhoven competed in the Eredivisie and the KNVB Cup, winning both, and reached the semi-finals of the European Cup.

== Squad ==
Note: Flags indicate national team as defined under FIFA eligibility rules; some limited exceptions apply. Players may hold more than one non-FIFA nationality.

No.	Pos.	Nation	Player
—	GK	NED	Jan van Beveren
—	GK	NED	André van Gerven
—	GK	NED	Ton van Engelen
—	DF	NED	Raymond Korteknie
—	DF	NED	Kees Krijgh
—	DF	NED	Adrie van Kraay
—	DF	NED	Tinie Meulenbroeks
—	DF	NED	Jan Poortvliet
—	DF	NED	Pleun Strik
—	MF	NED	Rini de Groot
—	MF	NED	René van de Kerkhof
—	MF	NED	Willy van de Kerkhof

No.	Pos.	Nation	Player
—	MF	NED	Willy van der Kuijlen
—	MF	NED	Geo de Leeuw
—	MF	NED	Bertus Quaars
—	MF	NED	Hans Strijbosch
—	MF	NED	Ton Wouters
—	FW	SWE	Peter Dahlqvist
—	FW	WAL	Nick Deacy
—	FW	NED	Gerrie Deijkers
—	FW	SWE	Ralf Edström
—	FW	BEL	Guy François
—	FW	NED	Harry Lubse
—	FW	NED	Toine van Mierlo
