= Yvo van Engelen =

Dutch footballer

Personal information
- Date of birth: 24 January 1985 (age 41)
- Place of birth: Vlijmen, Netherlands
- Height: 1.80 m (5 ft 11 in)
- Position: Defender

Youth career
- Vlijmense Boys
- RKC

Senior career*
| Years | Team | Apps | (Gls) |
| 2005–2007 | NAC | 4 | (0) |
| 2007–2009 | TOP Oss | 55 | (1) |
| 2009–2016 | OJC Rosmalen | | |
| 2016–2018 | DESK | | |
| 2019–2021 | Vlijmense Boys | | |
- * Club domestic league appearances and goals as of 25 October 2020

Yvo van Engelen (born 24 January 1985) is a Dutch retired footballer.

== Club career ==
Van Engelen is a defender who was born in Vlijmen and made his debut in professional football for NAC Breda in a September 2005 Eredivisie match against AZ.

After two seasons at TOP Oss, van Engelen moved into amateur football and played nine years for OJC Rosmalen before joining DESK in summer 2016. Two years later, he returned to childhood club Vlijmense Boys.

== Personal life ==
He is the son of former PSV Eindhoven goalkeeper Ton van Engelen.

== Statistics ==
| Season | Club | Country | League | Apps | Goals |
|---|---|---|---|---|---|
| 2005/06 | NAC Breda | Netherlands | Eredivisie | 4 | 0 |
| 2006/07 | NAC Breda | Netherlands | Eredivisie | 0 | 0 |
| 2007/08 | TOP Oss | Netherlands | Eerste Divisie | 29 | 1 |
| 2008/09 | TOP Oss | Netherlands | Eerste Divisie | 13 | 0 |
| Total | | | | 46 | 1 |

Last update: October 28, 2008
