= Antke Engel =

German philosopher and publicist (born 1965)

Antke Engel (born 21 September 1965 in Hamburg) is a German philosopher and publicist. Together with Sabine Hark, she is one of the pioneers of Butler reception in Germany, teaches as a visiting professor for Queer Studies at various universities and is the founder and director of the Institute for Queer Theory in Berlin.

== Career ==
Antke Engel studied philosophy, education and geography in Bielefeld and Hamburg. In 1995, she obtained her Magistra Artium in Philosophy at the University of Hamburg with the thesis "Abschied von der Binarität? Die Kategorie Geschlecht im feministisch-philosophischen Diskurs". In 2001, she received her doctorate in philosophy from the University of Potsdam with a queer-theoretical thesis published under the title "Wider die Eindeutigkeit". She has been a visiting professor at the Universities of Hamburg (2003/04 and 2005), Vienna (2011), at the Alice Salomon University of Applied Sciences Berlin (2015) and the TU Darmstadt (2018/2019). From 2007 to 2009 she was a Research Fellow at the Institute for Cultural Inquiry (ICI) Berlin, which resulted in the publication of her second monograph "Images of Sexuality and Economy" (2009). She held further fellowships in 1995 at the Institute for Human Sciences, in 2018 at the London School of Economics and in 2018/2019 as Asa Briggs Visiting Fellow at the University of Sussex.

In 2006, Engel founded the Institute for Queer Theory (iQt), which she has headed ever since. Opened in Hamburg in the Prinzenbar of the Dock and launched with lectures by Lisa Duggan and Judith Butler, it is now located on the site of the former Berliner Kindl-Brauerei in Neukölln in the immediate vicinity of the Schwuz. As director of the iQt, Engel conceives and organises events that are oriented towards a "queer politics of representation". She promotes international academic exchange through lecture series and conferences, in which experimentation with event formats and the participatory involvement of visitors play an important role. Together with Jess Dorrance, she organised the project "Bossing Images: The Power of Images, Queer Art and Politics" launched by the New Society for Visual Arts between 2012 and 2016.

Antke Engel is on the scientific advisory board of Femina Politica, the IPAK Research Center for Cultures, Politics and Identities in Belgrade, an associate member of the Centre for Transdisciplinary Gender Studies at Humboldt-Universität zu Berlin and a member of the College of Expert Reviewers of the European Science Foundation. From 2010 to 2012, she was on the founding board of the Fachgesellschaft Geschlechterstudien.

== Publishing activities ==
From 1990 to 1997, Engel was co-publisher, editor and author of the Hamburger Frauenzeitung, an independent feminist journal, which is now archived in the Digital German Women's Archive. As a queer theorist, she has co-edited two monographs and various anthologies, including the volume "Queering Demokratie" (2000), which documents the first international queer conference in Germany, which was organised by the Heinrich Böll Foundation in Berlin in 1998 and co-organised by Engel. With the volumes "Hegemony and Heteronormativity" and "Global Justice and Desire", she contributed to the international debate on Queer Studies as an editor.

Engel wrote a basic essay on the concepts of gender and sexuality in the introductory volume "Poststructuralist Social Science" published by Stephan Moebius and Andreas Reckwitz as well as an essay on queer methods in the volume "Dis/Kontinutäten. Feminist Theory" published several times.

Engel has also published numerous academic articles, including in Peer-Review journals such as Feministische Studien, Femina Politica, NORA - Nordic Journal of Feminist and Gender Research, Qualitative Inquiry, where her queer-theoretical method of "engaged ekphrasis" was introduced into the international discussion on qualitative social research in 2018, as well as art-theoretical essays, including in Kunstforum International, FKW - Zeitschrift für Geschlechterforschung und visuelle Kultur and the e-flux Journal.

== Work ==
Engel coined the term "strategy of disambiguation" to distinguish queer political approaches from identity or minority political strategies. At the forefront of her approach is the critique of identity politics and the normalisations, hierarchisations and exclusion processes that accompany them. This distinguishes it from approaches that see queer as a shortened form of LSBTTIA understanding it as policies aimed at visibility and recognition. According to Engel, queer politics is characterised by questioning and undermining the stability and unambiguity of identity categories, norms and prevailing power constellations. Engel formulates that it is neither about a duplication nor a dissolution of the category of gender, but about making the clear differentiability of two genders and unambiguous gender categorisations generally questionable.

Engel advocates an understanding of queer theory as a critique of power and domination that aims to dismantle all relations of inequality, exploitation and dominance. She combines the critical examination of gender, sexuality and desire as dimensions of social standardisation and inequality with the aim of promoting an understanding of comprehensive justice and non-hierarchical forms of difference.

Engel's academic work is characterised by the fact that she systematically combines social and cultural science approaches in her philosophical thinking. She works on post-structuralist philosophy, critique of representation and political theory (Judith Butler, Gilles Deleuze/Félix Guattari, Jacques Derrida, Michel Foucault, Ernesto Laclau/Chantal Mouffe, Teresa de Lauretis). Against the background of the image readings in "Images of Sexuality and Economy", she has developed a method of discourse analysis of visual material, which she describes as "committed ekphrasis". It is based on analysing interwoven dynamics of power and desire that unfold in dealing with artistic works and visual material.

Ob mancher Begeisterung für die überraschenden Verbindungen der Assemblage sind Machtanalyse und Herrschaftskritik in den Hintergrund geraten. Doch ist Assemblage, auch queer assemblage, nicht nur der Inbegriff gegenhegemonialer Konstellierungen, sondern ist auch die Form, in der Machtbewegungen und Herrschaftsverhältnisse auftreten.
