= Engelen (surname) =

Engelen is a Dutch patronymic surname, meaning "son of Engel", though occasionally the name may refer to the town Engelen. People with this surname include:

- Jos Engelen (born 1950), Dutch physicist
- Lucien Engelen (born 1962), Dutch healthcare researcher
- Marijke Engelen (born 1961), Dutch synchronized swimmer
- Maurice Engelen (born 1959), Belgian DJ and techno musician known as "Praga Khan"
- Paul Engelen (born 1949), British make-up artist
- Simone Engelen (born 1971), Dutch television host
- Ursula Engelen-Kefer (born 1943), German trade unionist

== See also ==
- Engel, Engelen, Engelman, Engelmann, Engelmeier, Engeln, Engels, Engelsman, Engle, Engleman
