= Peter Engle =

Peter Engle may refer to:

- Peter H. Engle (1808–1844), American lawyer and politician in Wisconsin Territory
- Peter King Engle or Peter Whitney (1916–1972), American actor

== See also ==
- Peter Engel (disambiguation)
