= Hans Reiter (physician) =

German Nazi physician (1881–1969)

Hans Reiter

Hans Conrad Julius Reiter (26 February 1881 – 25 November 1969) was a German Nazi physician who conducted medical experiments at the Buchenwald concentration camp. He wrote a book on "racial hygiene" called Deutsches Gold, Gesundes Leben – Frohes Schaffen. In 1916, he described a disease with the symptoms urethritis, conjunctivitis and arthritis, which became known as Reiter's syndrome.

Reiter was born in Reudnitz, near Leipzig in the German Empire. He studied medicine at Leipzig and Breslau (now Wrocław), and received a doctorate from Tübingen on the subject of tuberculosis. After receiving his doctorate, he went on to study at the hygiene institute in Berlin, the Pasteur Institute in Paris and St. Mary's Hospital in London, where he worked with Sir Almroth Wright for two years. Reiter was also known for implementing strict anti-smoking laws in Nazi Germany.

== First World War ==
During World War I, Reiter worked first as a German military physician on the Western Front in France. While there, he cared for several soldiers suffering from Weil's disease, and made his first notable discovery that one of the causative bacteria were Leptospira icterohaemorrhagica, which had eluded culture methods and identification by other scientists ever since that disease had been recognized in 1886. Later, after being transferred to the Balkans, where he served in the 1st Hungarian Army, he reported a German lieutenant with non-gonococcal urethritis, arthritis, and uveitis that developed two days after a diarrheal illness and had a protracted course with relapses over several months. The combination of two of the elements, urethritis and arthritis, had been recognized in the 16th century, and the triad had first been reported by Sir Benjamin Collins Brodie, an English surgeon who lived from 1783 to 1862. Separately from Reiter, the triad was also reported in 1916 by Fiessinger and Leroy. Reiter thought he saw a spirochete which he called Treponema forans, related to but distinct from Treponema pallidum, the causative agent of syphilis, and erroneously thought it was the cause, calling the disease Spirochaetosis Arthritica. The error probably was influenced by his previous discovery of Leptospira icterohaemorrhagica, and by his work on Treponema pallidum that later enabled others to develop the "Reiter Complement Fixation Test" for syphilis. Nevertheless, the eponym Reiter's syndrome was used for the disease he described, and the syndrome became widely known by that name.

== 1918–1939 ==
After the end of World War I, Reiter became chief of the hygiene department at Rostock. He was a political man, and an enthusiastic supporter of the Nazi regime. His career was further boosted when, in 1932, he signed an oath of allegiance to Adolf Hitler. In 1933, he was made department director of the Kaiser Wilhelm Institute of Experimental Therapy. In 1936, his meteoric rise continued when he was made director of the health department of Mecklenburg-Schwerin and received an honorary professorship in Berlin. With Johann Breger, he wrote a book on racial hygiene called Deutsches Gold, Gesundes Leben — Frohes Schaffen ("German Gold, Healthy Life — Glad Work"). He was also a strong supporter of Hitler's anti-smoking campaign, considered medically progressive at the time. Reiter was a talented teacher who was popular with his students.

== Second World War ==
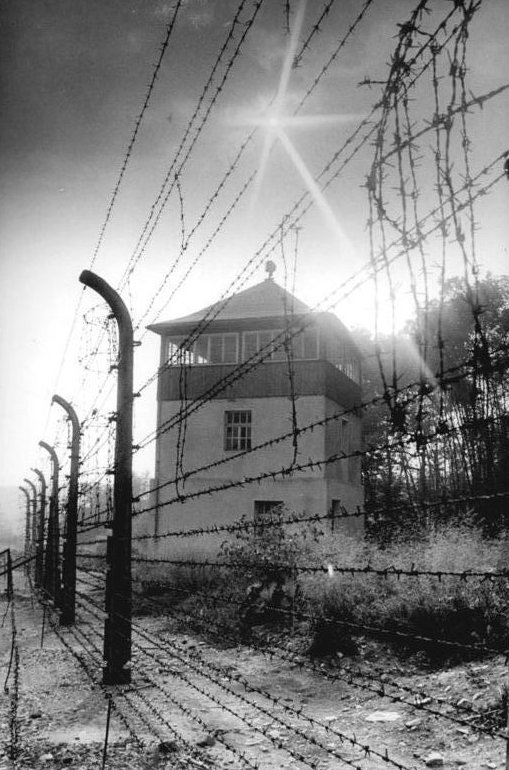
Watchtower at the memorial site Buchenwald, in 1983

Reiter was a member of the Schutzstaffel (SS) during World War II and participated in medical experiments performed by the Nazis. After the Nazis were defeated, he was arrested by the Red Army in Soviet Union-occupied Germany and tried at Nuremberg. During his detention, he admitted to knowledge of involuntary sterilization, euthanasia, and the murder of mental hospital patients in his function as the gatherer of statistics and acting as "quality control" officer, and to helping design and implement an explicitly criminal undertaking at Buchenwald concentration camp, in which internees were inoculated with an experimental typhus vaccine, resulting in over 200 deaths. He gained an early release from his internment, possibly because he assisted the Allies with his knowledge of germ warfare.

== Later life ==
After his release, Reiter went back to work in the field of medicine and research in rheumatology. He died at age 88, in 1969, at his country estate in Kassel-Wilhelmshöhe.

== Reiter's syndrome ==
In 1977, a group of doctors began a campaign to replace the term "Reiter's syndrome" with "reactive arthritis". In addition to Reiter's war crimes, they pointed out that he was not the first to describe the syndrome, nor were his conclusions correct regarding its pathogenesis. Reiter incorrectly concluded that the triad of conjunctivitis, urethritis, and non-gonococcal arthritis was the result of a spirochetal infection and proposed the name "Spirochaetosis arthrosis". The group of doctors was joined by Dr. Ephraim Engleman, one of the authors on the first English-language journal article that used the term "Reiter's syndrome", who was still practising 65 years later and had been unaware of Reiter's Nazi connections at the time he suggested the eponym. The campaign gradually gained momentum, and the term "Reiter's syndrome" has become increasingly anachronistic and has fallen out of favor.
