= Nieuwkuijk =

- Village
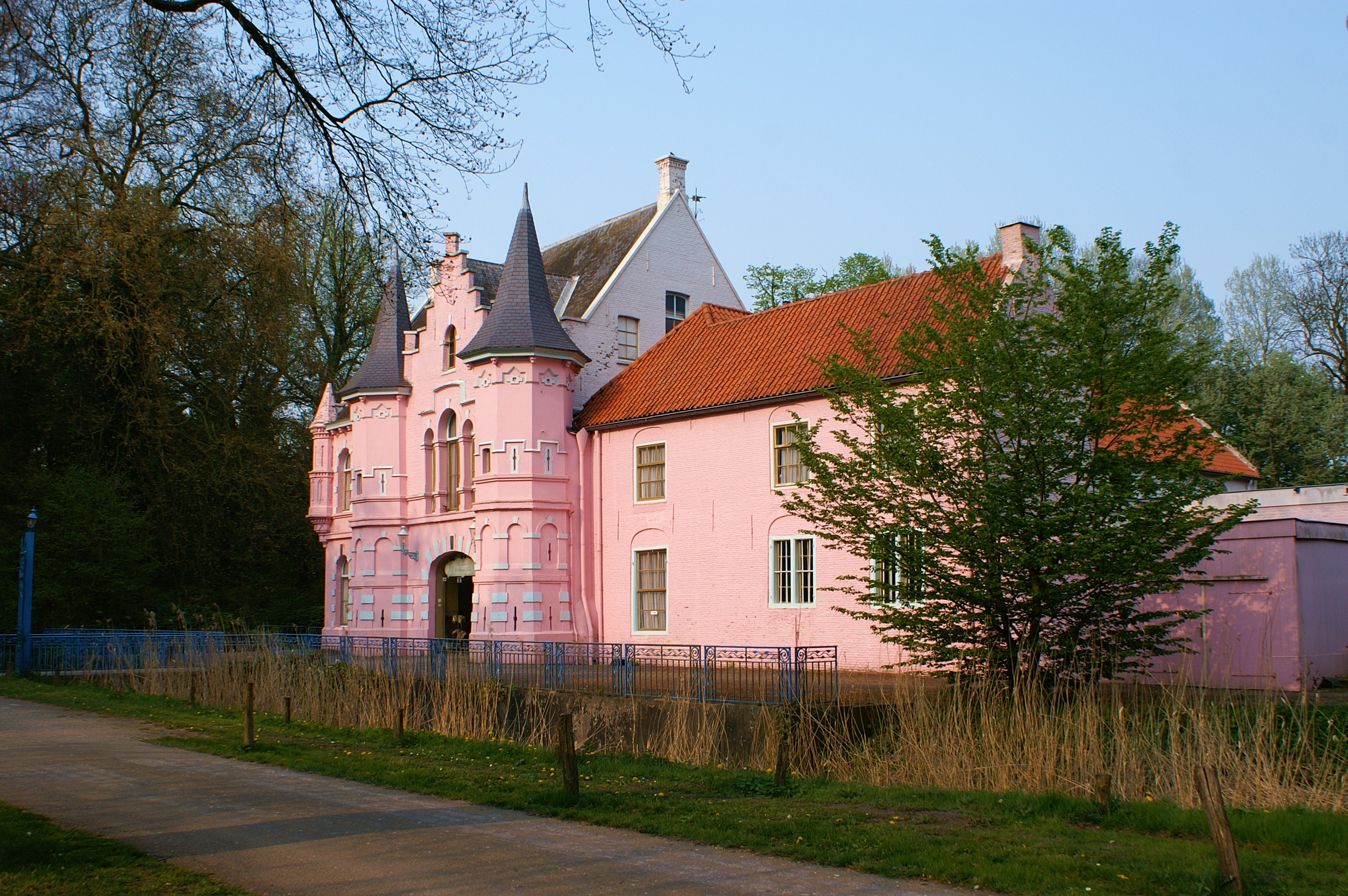
- Castle d'Oultremont or the pink castle

- Coat of arms

- Location within North Brabant Location within Netherlands
- Coordinates: 51°41′37″N 5°10′50″E
- Country: Netherlands
- Province: North Brabant
- Municipality: Heusden

Area
  - Total: 3.40 km^{2} (1.31 sq mi)
- Elevation: 3.2 m (10 ft)

Population (2021)
  - Total: 2,095
  - Density: 616/km^{2} (1,600/sq mi)
- Time zone: UTC+1 (CET)
  - Summer (DST): UTC+2 (CEST)
- Postal code: 5253
- Dialing code: 073
- Major roads: A59

Nieuwkuijk is a village in the Dutch province of North Brabant. It is located in the municipality of Heusden, about 10 km west of 's-Hertogenbosch.

== History ==
The village was first mentioned in 1383 as Niewekuyc, which means "new settlement of Cuijk". The family of Cuijk used to own land in the area.

Castle Onsenoort was built in 1382 by the heer of the heerlijkheid Nieuwkuijk. In the 19th century, it became part of the Cistercian monastery Mariënkroon. The tower probably dates from the 14th century. The monastery buildings were built in 1910. The main building and gate were added between 1934 and 1935. In 2016, the abbey closed down. It is now used as a conference centre.

Castle d'Oultremont probably originates from the 15th century. In 1707, it came into the possession of the counts of d'Oultremont. The building burnt down in 1795, and was rebuilt in 1875. In 1989, it became part of the amusement park Het Land van Ooit and was painted pink. After the amusement park went bankrupt, the castle was restored in 2019, and the pink paint was removed.

The floods of Nieuwkuijk in 1880 shocked the whole of the Netherlands. From mid-December onwards, the Meuse water level was so high that many villagers became anxious. On 30 December, the dike broke and in the days that followed, the water flowed so rapidly that people could not be rescued from their roofs with boats. The entire land of Heusden and Altena was flooded. It was not until 18 January that the construction of a new dike could be started, and completed one month later. The new dike, 600 m long, was built by Nicolaas van Haaren together with Wouter Pietersz. de Vries.

Nieuwkuijk was home to 978 people in 1840. Nieuwkuijk was a separate municipality until 1935, when it became part of Vlijmen. In 1997, it became part of the municipality of Heusden.

== Gallery ==
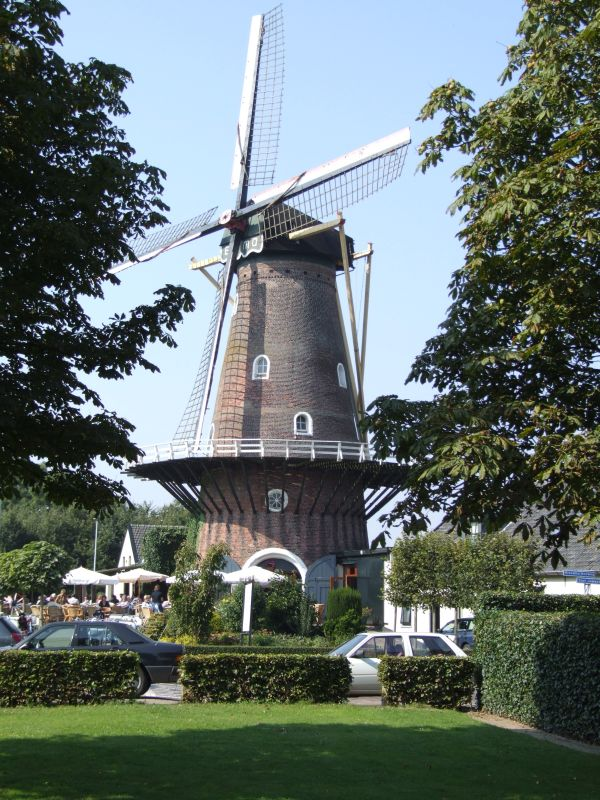
The Emmamolen

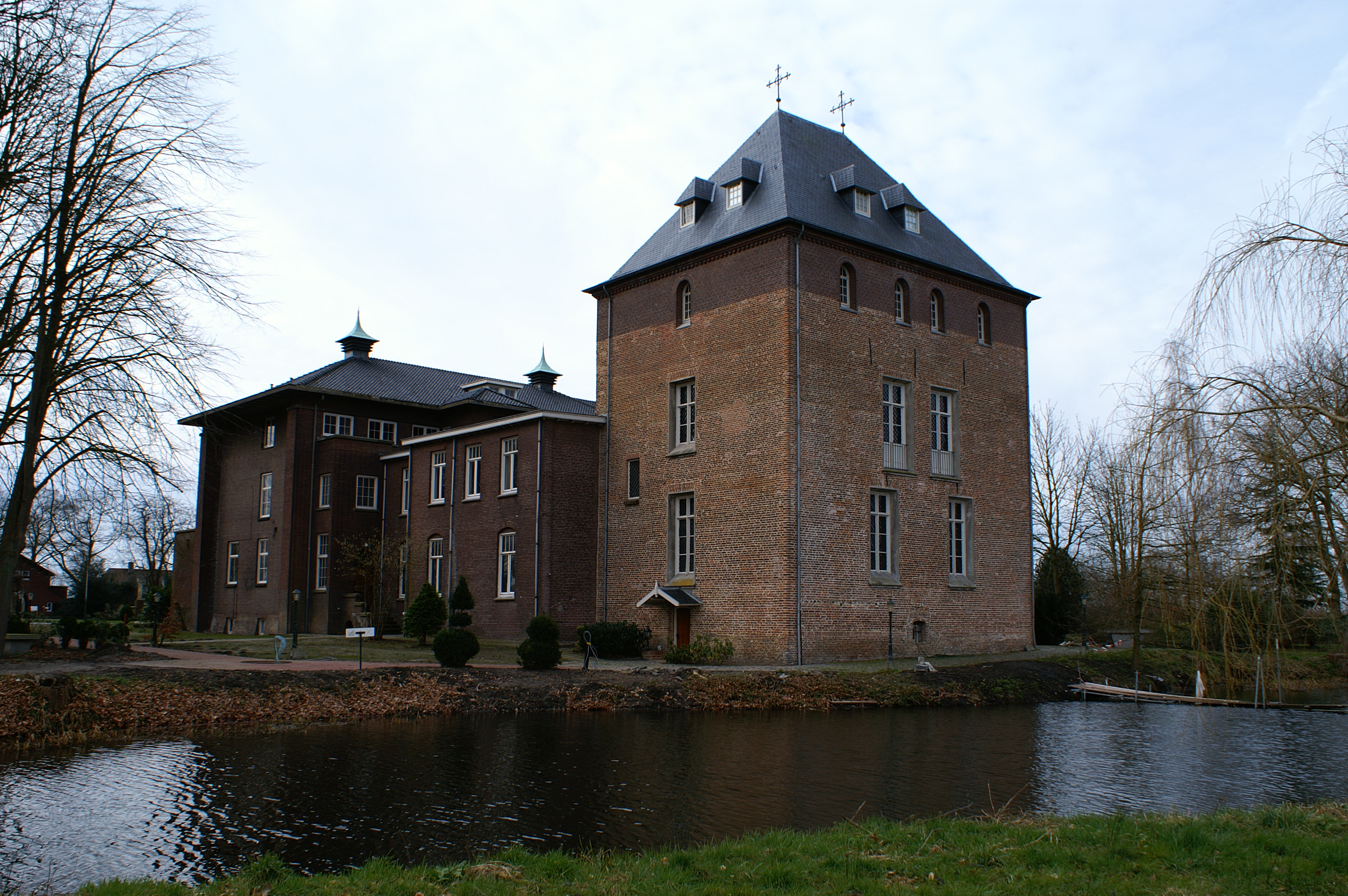
The Castle Onsenoort

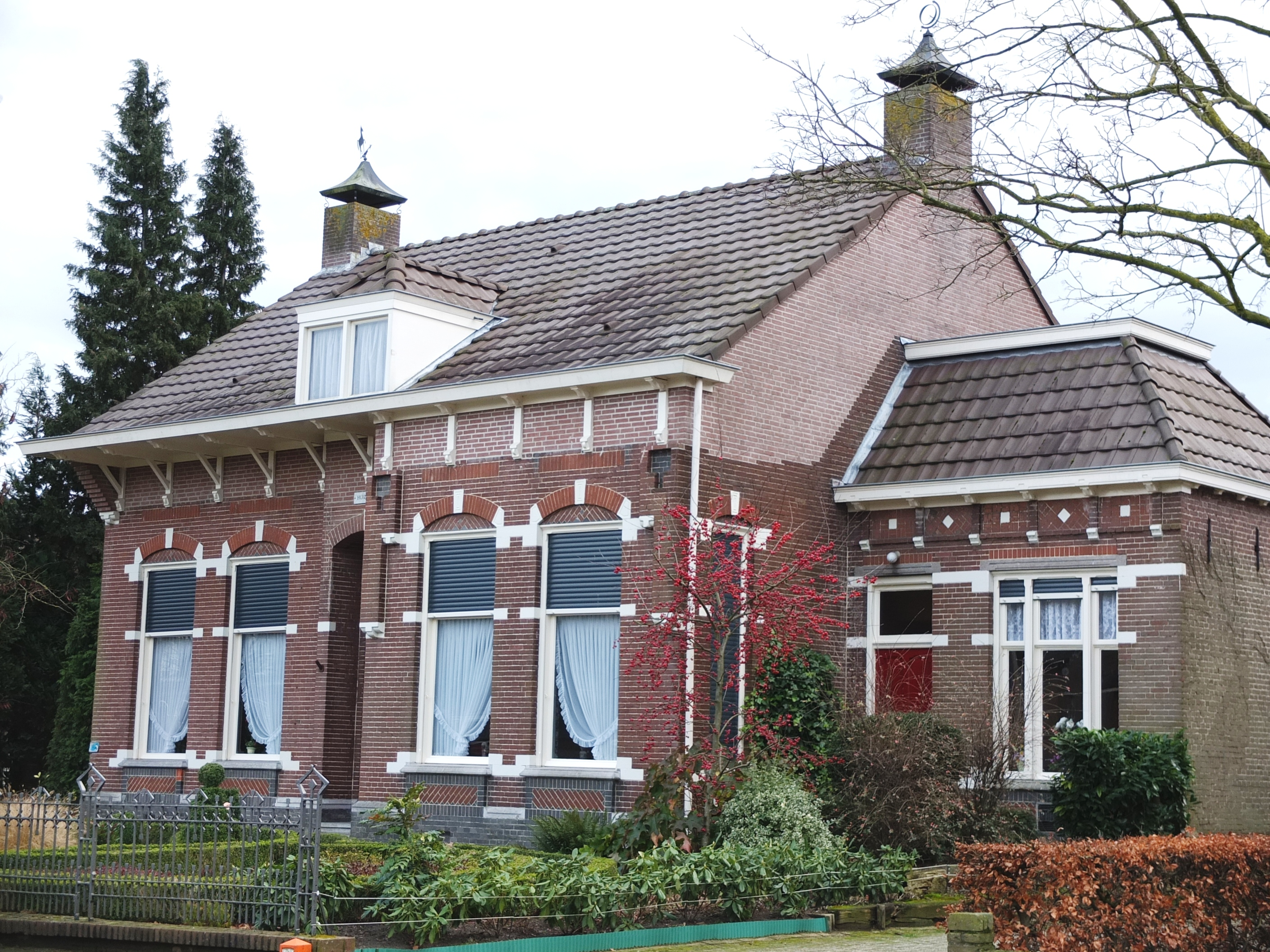
House in Nieuwkuijk

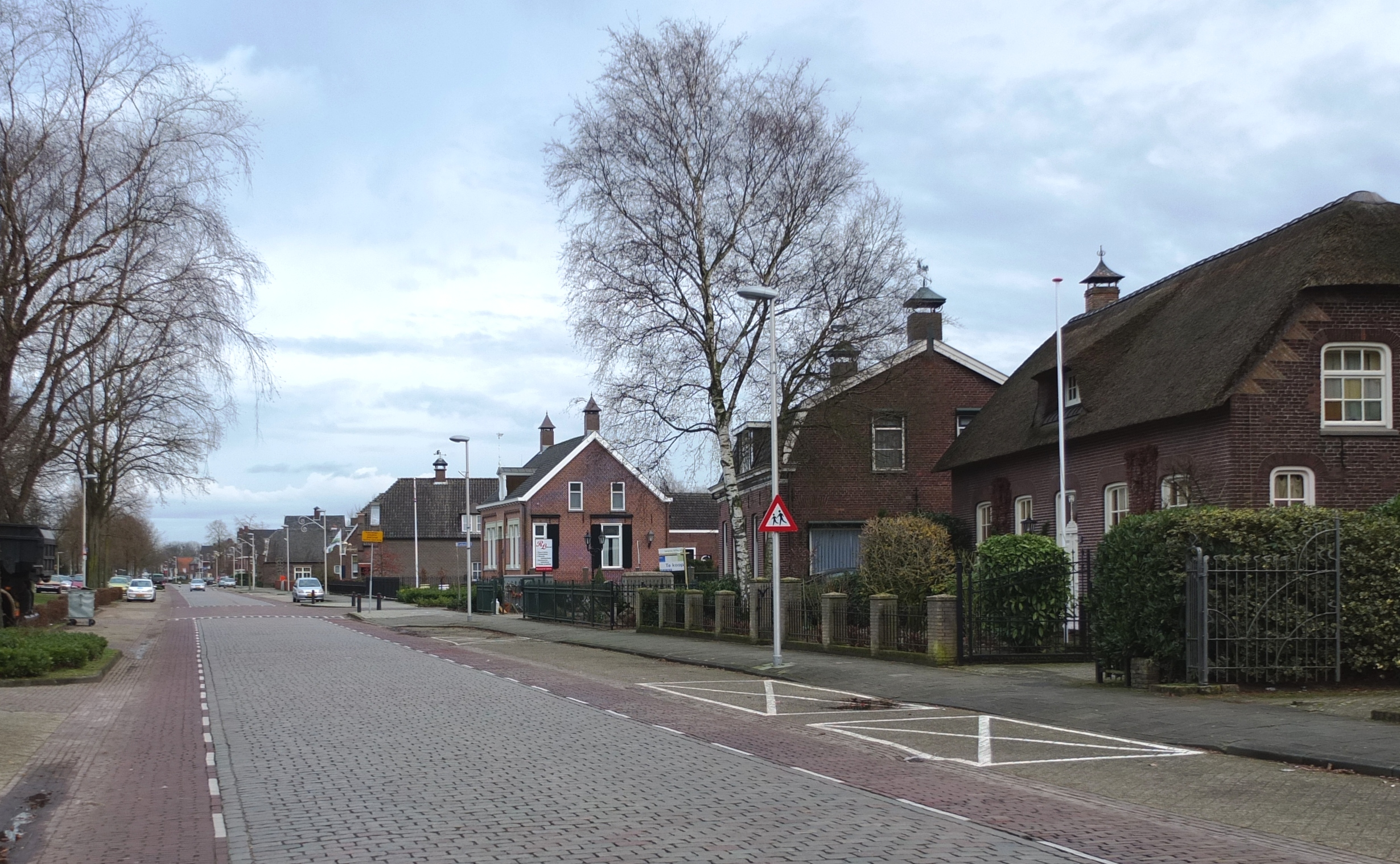
Street of Nieuwkuijk
