= Engleman =

Engleman is the surname of the following people:

- Ephraim Engleman (1911–2015), American rheumatologist
- Glennon Engleman (1927–1999), American murderer
- Harry Engleman (1912–1992), pianist, bandleader and composer, son of Joseph
- Jennadean Engleman (1890–1940), birth name of Bird Millman, high-wire performer
- Joseph Engleman (1881–1949), light music composer, father of Harry Engleman
- Howard Engleman (1919–2011), American college basketball player
- Michael Engleman (born 1958), American cyclist

== See also ==
- Engel, Engelen Van Engelen, Engelman, Engelmann, Engelmeier, Engeln, Engels, Engelsman, Engle, Engleman
