= Vlijmen en Engelen =

Coordinates: 51.708204°N 5.237389°E

Vlijmen en Engelen was a municipality in the Dutch province of North Brabant. It covered the villages of Vlijmen and Engelen.

Vlijmen en Engelen was a separate municipality until 1821, when it was divided in two municipalities, Vlijmen and Engelen.
