= Cory Kenyon =

American novelist pseudonyms

Mary Tate Engels & Vicki Lewis Thompson
- Occupation: Novelists
- Writing career
- Pen name: Cory Kenyon; Corey Keaton
- Genre: Romance

Cory Kenyon and Corey Keaton are pseudonyms used by Mary Tate Engels and Vicki Lewis Thompson, two American writers who wrote collaboratively.

== Bibliography ==
=== As Cory Kenyon ===
==== Single Novels ====
- Sheer Delight (1986)
- Fortune Hunter (1986)
- Ruffled Feathers (1986)
- The Quintessential Woman (1987)
- Fancy Footwork (1987)

=== As Corey Keaton ===
==== Single Novel ====
- The Nesting Instinct (1989)
