= Johannes Engelmann =

Johannes Engelmann (7 July [O.S. 25 June] 1832 in Mitau, Courland (now Jelgava, Latvia) – 17 September [O.S. 4 September] 1912 in Dorpat, Livonia (now Tartu, Estonia)) was a Baltic German jurist.

== Biography ==
Educated at the University of Saint Petersburg he became professor of Russian law at Dorpat in 1860, retaining the chair for 39 years, and delivering his lectures in Russian instead of German after 1887. These lectures covered a wide field and contributed greatly to the advancement of the science of jurisprudence in Russia.

== Works ==
Among his works are:

- Die Verjahrung nach russischem Privatrecht (1867; in Russian, 1868)
- Die Zwangsvollstreckung auswärtiger richterlicher Urteile in Russland (1884; also translated into French and Russian)
- Das Staatsrecht Russlands (1888)
