= Kai Engelke =

German Liedermacher, writer and journalist (1946–2025)

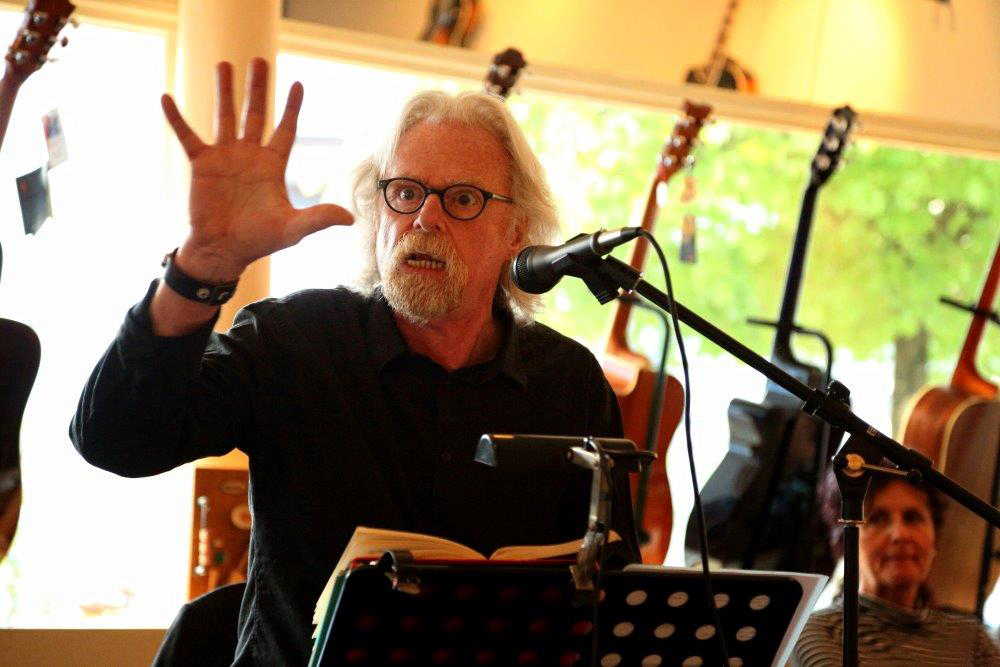
Engelke and Helm van Hahm in 2013

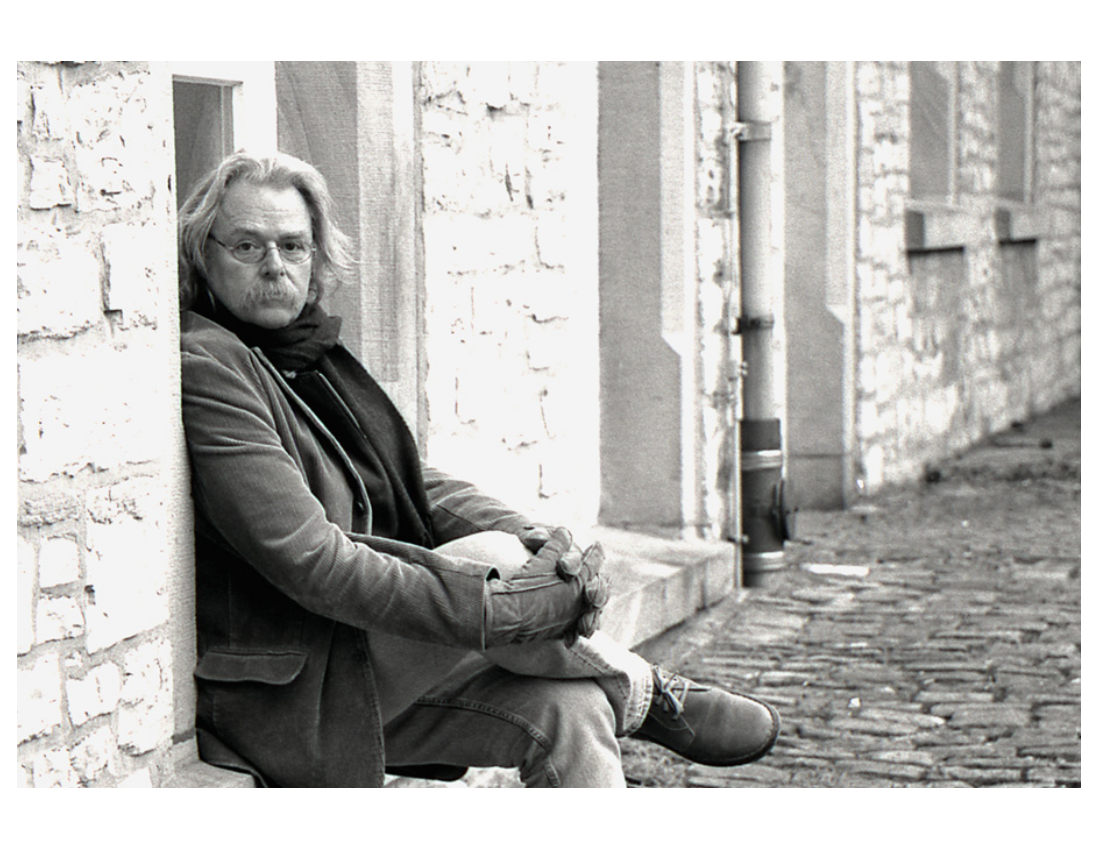
Engelke in 2004

Kai Engelke (1 April 1946 – 6 September 2025) was a German writer, music journalist, reciter, singer-songwriter and teacher.

== Life and career ==
Kai Engelke was the son of journalist and author Jooschen Engelke (1918–1962) and painter Robin Mück-Engelke (1909–2000). He was born in Göttingen, grew up in Hildesheim (Lower Saxony) as well as Berlin, and was also based on the North Frisian Island Föhr on the German coast of the North Sea. His formative years were marked by constant change as the family moved to different places in Germany. As a consequence, he was educated at a boarding school in Marburg, attended grammar school in Gießen, commenced his journalistic training with renowned German newswire dpa (Frankfurt/Main) and eventually graduated from Hildesheim University, majoring in educational science. Subsequently, he freelanced with Hildesheimer Presse, taz Bremen and pursued journalistic projects with radio stations such as NDR Hannover and Radio Bremen. Over his career, Engelke contributed essays, commentaries, novels and poetry to more than 100 anthologies.

Between 1975 and 2011, Engelke worked as primary school teacher in Esterwegen, Emsland. From 1981 to 1988, he coordinated the Surwolder Literaturgespräche, a platform for painters, journalists, playwrights, authors and musicians to mix and mingle, attend workshops, perform and be merry. From 2001 to 2007 Engelke was the art director of Bremen-based Landesliteraturtage Niedersachsen/Bremen. Also, he has been active as art director as well as facilitator at the Meppener Krimitage (crime fiction event based in Meppen/Germany) since 2009. He has been facilitating the International Liederfeste at Burg Waldeck since 2011, contributed as jury-member and was in charge of the Liederbestenliste (high score list for world music and folk releases) as well as the Preis der deutschen Schallplattenkritik (acclaimed award for best German releases). As longstanding editor he contributed essays, reviews and commentaries for Germany-based folk and world music magazine Folker.

He was a contributing member of the German Writers' Guild Verband Deutscher Schriftsteller (VS) between 1978 and 2014. Over and above his membership with the Writer's Guild he also worked as executive member being in charge of matters in Lower Saxony. He was a member of the Syndikat since 2005 – an association of German crime authors.

Engelke was married to Ulrike Engelke and a father of five children. He died in Spahnharrenstätte, Lower Saxony, on 6 September 2025, at the age of 79.

== Works ==
=== Lyrics ===
- Lärmend der Nacht entgegen, lyrics, Convent-Verlag, Oldenburg 1977.
- Berührungsversuche, lyrics, Bläschke-Verlag, A-St.Michael 1979, 2. Aufl. 1980.
- Die Angst macht mir Bauchweh, lyrics and songs, Gauke-Verlag, Hannober Münden 1980.
- Und im Herbst da wachsen mir Flügel, lyrics, Edition Lyrik für alle, Frankfurt 1981.
- Mit der Welt im Kopf, lyrics, Atelier Bücker, Wehm 1989.
- Wölfe malen immer blau, lyrics (with J. Haverkamp), Waldecker Drucke, Dorweiler/Hunsrück 1990.
- Surwold-Blues, lyrics from 15 years, Rhön-Verlag, Hünfeld 1997.

=== Prose ===
- Mein kleines dunkles Zimmer, stories, Eigenverlag, 1979.
- Haus im Moor, prose miniature, Die Halbe Bogen Reihe, Göttingen 1987.
- Any I Malala, story, Verlag Dr. Werner Reinhard, Leer 1990.
- Detlef, ruf deine Mutter an! Stories and satire, Klaus Bielefeld Verlag, Friedland 1998, 4. Auflage 2000.
- Wie gut, dass bei uns alles anders ist! East-West-Dialog with Chr. Kuhn, Klaus Bielefeld Verlag, Friedland 1999, 6. Auflage 2000.
- Blut, Schweiß und Träume, novel, Klaus Bielefeld Verlag, Friedland 2000.
- Der Vollzeit-Erschrecker, detective stories, Leda-Verlag, Leer 2002.
- Der Totdenker, detective novel, Leda-Verlag, Leer 2005.
- Musik liegt in der Gruft, new detective novels, Leda-Verlag, Leer 2016.
- SArG die Wahrheit, 27 new novels about love, crime and "schröge Vägel", with ca 30 graphics of Jürgen B. Wolff, Norderstedt 2020

=== Editions ===
- Ich denke an Morgen, teachers are writing lyrics, Gauke-Verlag, Hannover Münden 1979, 2. Auflage 1981.
- Gauke's Jahrbuch 1982 (hopes, alternatives, utopias), Gauke-Verlag, Hannover Münden 1981.
- Straßenmusik – ein Handbuch, Gauke-Verlag, Hannoner Münden 1981, 2. extended edition1983.
- Gauke's Jahrbuch 1983 (peace) Gauke-Verlag, Hannover Münden 1982.
- Surwolder Literaturgespräche, Dokumentation I-III, Verlag Graphikum Dr. Mock, Bovenden 1982.
- Schreib weiter!, Dokumentation Surwolder Literaturgespräche IV-VI, Gauke-Verlag, Hann. Münden 1983.
- Literatur im Moor, Dokumentation Surwolder Literaturgespräche VII-IX, Edition Collage, Hildesheim 1984.
- Literatur im Moor 2, Dokumentation Surwolder Literaturgespräche X-XVI, Springintgut-Verlag, Oldenburg 1986.
- Zwischen Idylle und Detonation, Documentation of an east–west-German writers meeting, Waldecker Drucke, Dorweiler 1990.
- Ostfriesland literarisch, 37 author portraits, Arbeitskreis ostfriesischer Autorinnen und Autoren, Aurich 1996.
- Gezeitenwende, Ostfriesische Literatur der 90er-Jahre, (Schriftleitung), De Utrooper Verlag, Aurich 1996.
- Das Pferd im See, lyrics, songs and stories by Josef Hermann (Jooschen) Engelke, Leda-Verlag, Leer 2004.

=== MCs ===
- Lou Reed, Paul & andere Wölfe, texts and songs (with Peter Herwig), Edition Collage, Hildesheim 1983.
- Zorn & Zärtlichkeit, Poesie und Piano, with P. Gerdes, J. Voß and Chr. Jarrett, Edition Collage, Hildesheim 1984.

=== Vinyl ===
- Musik im Moor, Die Musiker der Surwolder Literaturgespräche I-X, Edition Collage, Hildesheim 1984.

=== CDs ===
- Jazz'n´Poetry, with St. Gurr and R. Schulz, Wonderland Records, Osnabrück 1994.
- Es Mi Tango, with R. Schulz and others, Wonderland Records, Osnabrück 1998.
- Mitternachtsgesänge, Die verlorenen Lieder des Jooschen Engelke, Conträr Musik, Schwarzenbek 2010.

== Awards ==
- Georg Weerth-Literaturpreis 1989
- 1. Price at the Hamburg-Wilhelmsdorfer Poetry-Slam 1998
- Leaderboard the new book in Niedersachsen and Bremen 2001

== Television ==
- "Man kann ja nie wissen", Porträt Kai Engelke in German TV N3, 1986
- "Emslandlager", Kai Engelke reads lyrics, 3sat, 22. Jule 1993
- "Tandem-Lesung", Kai Engelke and Chr. Kuhn, TV Halle, 5. October 1999
- "Schlaflos um Mitternacht", Interview with Kai and Ulrike Engelke, ZDF, 11. March 2003

== Bibliography ==
- Wer ist wer, das deutsche Who's Who, 25. Ausgabe, Lübeck 1986 (S. 292 ff)
- Hildesheimer Literaturlexikon von 1800 bis heute, Olms Verlag, Hildesheim 1996 (S. 63–65)
- Literatur in Niedersachsen, Wallstein Verlag, Göttingen 2000 (S. 29)
- Literarischer Führer Deutschland, Insel Verlag, Frankfurt und Leipzig 2008 (S.842)
