= De Engel (restaurant) =

Coordinates: 51°54′57.23″N 4°28′29.09″E

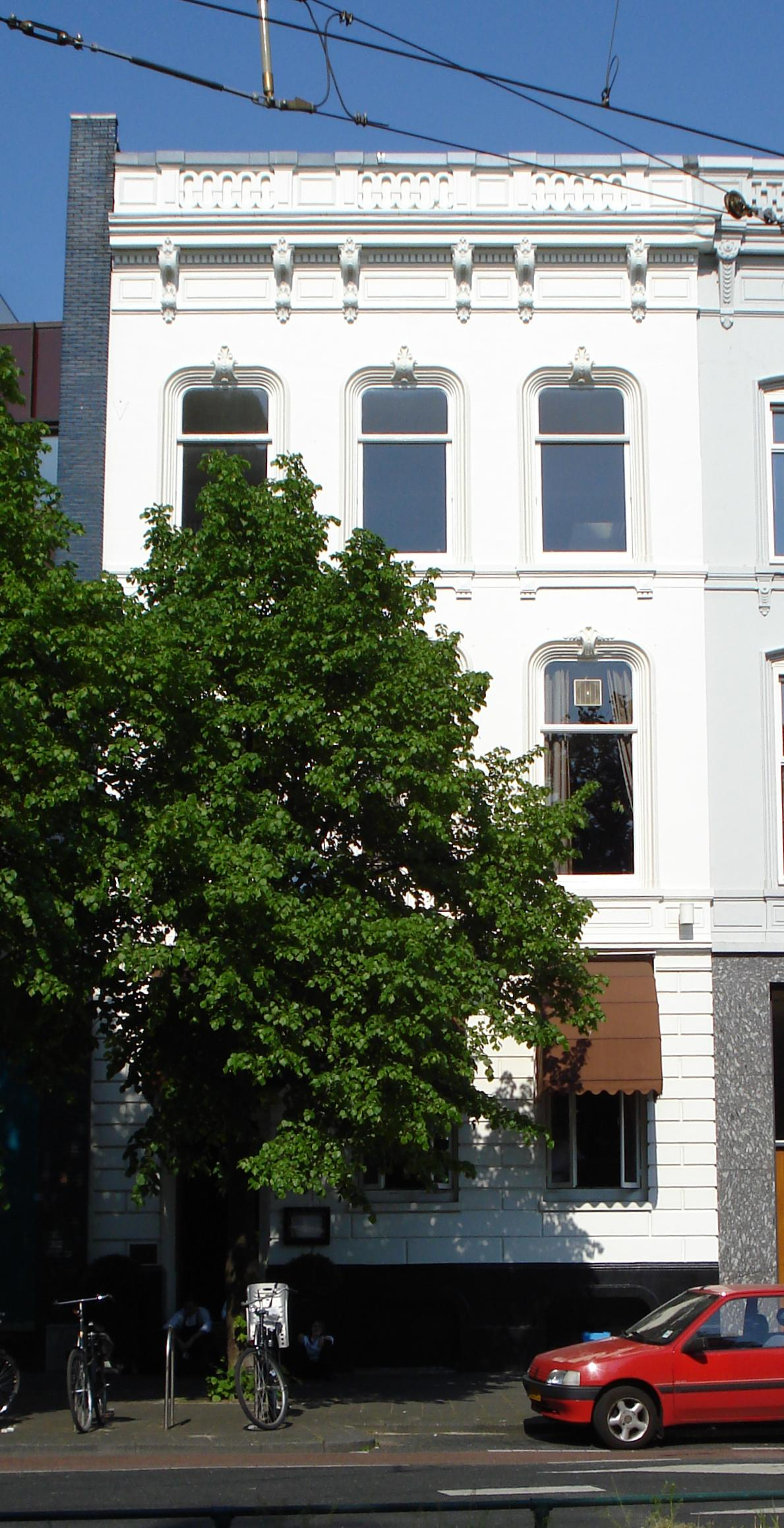
- Interactive map of De Engel

Restaurant information
- Established: 1993
- Head chef: Lars Litz
- Food type: French
- Location: Eendrachtsweg 19, Rotterdam, 3012 LB, Netherlands
- Seating capacity: 70
- Website: Official website

De Engel was a restaurant in Rotterdam, Netherlands. It is a fine dining restaurant that was awarded one Michelin star in 1997 and retained that rating until 2001. It held a Bib Gourmand at least in 2003.

GaultMillau awarded the restaurant 13.0 out of 20 points.

The head chef of De Engel is Lars Litz. During the Michelin period, it was Herman den Blijker. He still owns the restaurant.

The restaurant was housed in a Dutch national monument, a mansion with stucco cornice and stucco decorations, built in the third quarter of the 19th century.

== See also ==
- List of Michelin starred restaurants in the Netherlands
