= Royan Engel =

American singer, actress and business executive

Royan Engel (born 1943 or 1944) is an American former singer and actress who became a business executive.

== Early years ==
Engel is the daughter of actor Roy Engel. She attended John Marshall High School and graduated from California State College at Los Angeles. After her college graduation, Engel worked for the Los Angeles City Parks Department. In 1963, Engle was parade marshal for the San Fernando Valley Rodeo.

== Career ==
Engel's father's connections were assets during her time as an actress and a singer. She said that he "knew everyone in Los Angeles and everyone owed him at least one favor and I collected them all." His connections and her lyric soprano voice helped her to sing lead for national performing companies, and she performed on film, in nightclubs, and on television.

Her work as an entertainer took her into trade shows when she was selected to be featured at events with titles that included Queen of the 4th International Sports, Vacation and Travel Show in 1963. She also worked as a narrator and demonstrator at a trade show in San Francisco. She talked to people behind the scenes at such events and began to notice that some of the ideas she suggested were being implemented.

That realization led to her using a spare bedroom in her Glendale home to start her own business, a one-woman operation whose work won several prizes for clients for having the best exhibits in their trade shows. Her efforts received a boost when some men in New York provided "$2,000, an office and a phone and said 'See what you can do'".

Engel founded Stratagem Enterprises Inc., a company that produces trade shows and industrial exhibits. As president of the company, in 1975, she headed a staff of 22 people. With offices in New York and San Francisco, in the early 1970s the company was grossing more than $1 million a year. Its clients included ALCOA, Chicago Mercantile Exchange, and Pfizer Pharmaceuticals. Stratagem's approach is to provide a complete package to represent a product at a trade show. After she sees a product, her company designs and builds the exhibit, scripts a demonstration, and operates a hospitality suite. It also produces films for the demonstrations if they are needed.

Engel compares her trade-show work to show business, with the difference being that the former sells an act, while the latter sells a product.

== Personal life ==
Engel is an equestrienne and a dog trainer who has won blue ribbons with her springer spaniel.
