= Roy Engel =

American actor (1913–1980)

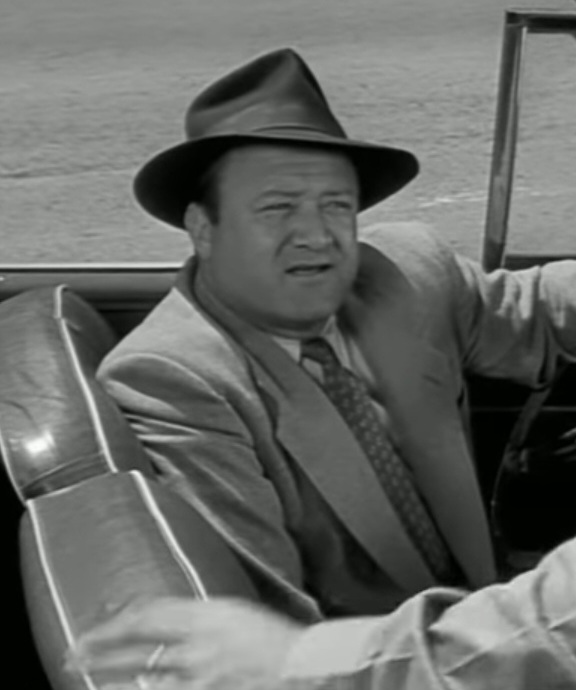
- Engel in Suddenly (1954)
- Born: Leroy Englewood Stults Jr. September 13, 1913; St. Louis, Missouri, U.S.
- Died: December 29, 1980 (aged 67); Burbank, California, U.S.
- Occupation: Actor
- Years active: 1943–1977
- Children: Royan Engel

Roy Engel (born Leroy Englewood Stults Jr.; September 13, 1913 – December 29, 1980) was an American actor on radio, film, and television. He performed in more than 150 films and almost 800 episodes of television programs.

== Career ==
Engel's ancestry was Irish and Dutch. His father was Roy Engelwood Stults. Engel was a letterman in football Rockhurst High School and Rockhurst College. After he graduated from college, he worked in a warehouse.

Engel's career in radio began at KCMO in Kansas City. His first work on network radio came when he had a role on Jack Armstrong, the All-American Boy. He provided the original voice of the title character on the radio version of Sky King from 1946-1947. His film debut came in D.O.A. (1949).

On television, Engel made eleven appearances in Gunsmoke and had recurring roles as a rancher on The Virginian and as a doctor on Bonanza.

== Personal life and death ==
Engel was married, and the couple had a daughter, Royan.

On December 29, 1980, Engel died at St. Joseph's Hospital in Burbank, California at age 67.

== Selected filmography ==
- The Flying Saucer (1950) as Dr. Carl Lawton
- Outrage (1950) as Sheriff Charlie Hanlon
- Chicago Calling (1951) as Pete
- Rogue River (1951) as Ed Colby
- M (1951) as Police Chief Regan
- The Man from Planet X (1951) as Tommy - the Constable
- The Well (1951) as Gleason
- The Sellout (1952) as Sam F. Slaper
- Zombies of the Stratosphere (1952) as Lawson - Boat Charter Operator [Ch. 3]
- Breakdown (1952) as Al Bell
- Strange Fascination (1952) as Mr. Frim
- Jungle Drums of Africa (1953) as First Constable [Chs.7,12]
- The Magnetic Monster (1953) as Gen. Behan
- The Band Wagon (1953) as Reporter (uncredited)
- Thy Neighbor's Wife (1953)
- The Naked Dawn (1955) as Guntz
- Indestructible Man (1956) as Desk Sergeant
- Frontier Gambler (1956) as Tom McBride
- Three Violent People (1956) as Carpetbagger
- Not of This Earth (1957) as Sgt. Walton
- The Storm Rider (1957) as Major Bonnard
- Escape from San Quentin (1957) as Hap Graham
- Death in Small Doses (1957) as Wally Morse
- The Veil (1958, TV Mini-Series) as Wally Hoffman
- Joy Ride (1958) as Barrett
- A Dog's Best Friend (1959) as Sheriff Dan Murdock
- Gunsmoke (1960) as Grimes in “Don Matteo” (S6E7)
- The Sergeant Was a Lady (1961) as Sgt. Bricker
- The Flight That Disappeared (1961) as Jameson
- My Three Sons (04/12/1962) "Innocents Abroad" as Steve's visiting old friend
- "It's a Mad, Mad, Mad, Mad World" (1963) Santa Rosita patrol officer
- The Virginian (1964 episode "The Intruders") as Barney Wingate
- Your Cheatin' Heart (1964) as Joe Rauch
- Wild Wild West (1967) as General Grant
- Lawman (1971) as Bartender
- The Last Movie (1971) as Harry Anderson
- The Last Child (1971, TV Movie) as Conductor
- Skyjacked (1972) as Pilot
- When the Legends Die (1972) as Sam Turner
- Charley and the Angel (1973) as Driver
- Switchblade Sisters (1975) as Jobo
- The Amazing Howard Hughes (1977, TV Movie) as Production Manager
- Kingdom of the Spiders (1977) as Mayor Connors

== Selected Television ==
Year	Title	Role	Notes
1958	Cheyenne (TV series)	U.S. Marshal Thad Veck	Season 3/Episode 15 - “Wagon-Tongue North"
1960	Death Valley Days	John Fremont	Season 9/Episode 7 - The Gentle Sword
1961	Have Gun-Will Travel	Sheriff	Season 4/Episode 27 - “Everyman"
1961	Wanted: Dead or Alive	Art Hampton	Season 3 Episode 25 (Dead Reckoning)
1962	Rawhide	Whit Stokes	Season 5/Episode 6 - "Incident of the Lost Woman"
1962	The Andy Griffith Show	Jess Morgan	Season 3/Episode 3 - “Andy and the New Mayor"
1966	The Wild Wild West	President Ulysses S. Grant	Season 1/Episode 16 - "The Night of the Steel Assassin"
1967	The Wild Wild West	President Ulysses S. Grant	Season 2/Episode 24 - "The Night of the Colonel's Ghost"
1967	The Wild Wild West	President Ulysses S. Grant	Season 3/Episode 16 - "The Night of the Arrow"
1968	The Wild Wild West	President Ulysses S. Grant	Season 3/Episode 24 - "The Night of the Death-Maker"
1968	The Wild Wild West	President Ulysses S. Grant	Season 4/Episode 1 - "The Night of the Big Blackmail"
1969	The Wild Wild West	President Ulysses S. Grant	Season 4/Episode 15 - "The Night of the Winged Terror, Part 1"
1972	Mission Impossible	Judge (uncredited)	Episode "Committed"
