= Engle, West Virginia =

Unincorporated community in West Virginia, United States

- Unincorporated community
- Location within West Virginia Location within the United States
- Coordinates: 39°20′39″N 77°46′52″W
- Country: United States
- State: West Virginia
- County: Jefferson
- Time zone: UTC-5 (Eastern (EST))
  - Summer (DST): UTC-4 (EDT)
- GNIS feature ID: 1554402

Engle is an unincorporated community in Jefferson County, West Virginia, United States, originally known by the names of Millers Mill, Striders Crossing, Keller, and Engles Switch before its post office's name changed to Engle in 1910.

The community was named after Frank Engle, the proprietor of a lime kiln.
