= Senator Engel =

Senator Engel may refer to:

- Albert J. Engel (1888–1959), Michigan State Senate
- Kirsten Engel (born 1961/62), Arizona State Senate
- L. Patrick Engel (1932–2022), Nebraska State Senate

== See also ==
- Clair Engle (1911–1964), U.S. Senator from California from 1959 to 1964
