= Karl Dietrich Leonhard Engel =

Karl Dietrich Leonhard Engel (born Oldenburg, 21 February 1824; died Adlershof, February 1913) was a German musician and writer.

== Biography ==
He went to Russia as a violin virtuoso at the age of 18, becoming a member of the Imperial Orchestra at Saint Petersburg at 22, and later its concertmaster. He went to Dresden in 1869 and took up his residence there.

== Literary works ==
Among his works are:

- Deutsche Puppen Komödien (1874–93)
- Das Volksschauspiel Doktor Johann Faust (2d ed., 1882)
- Zusammenstellung der Faustschriften vom 16 Jahrhundert bis Mitte 1884 (2d ed., 1884)
- Die Don Juan Sage auf der Bühne (1887)

== Musical works ==
His musical compositions include a concerto in B minor and the humorous fantasy entitled “Jüdischer Carneval.”
