= Jacob Engle =

Religious leader (1753-1833)

Jacob Engle (1753–1833), born Jacob Engel, was the most important leader of the River Brethren in the time of their emergence as a Christian denomination.

Engle was born in Switzerland as the fourth son of Ulrich Engel and Anna née Brächbühl. As an infant he emigrated with his family from the Corgémont to Pennsylvania to flee religious persecution. They sailed from Rotterdam and arrived in Philadelphia on October 1, 1754. They established a homestead in northwest Lancaster County, Pennsylvania.

In the 1770s, a religious awakening swept through the settlements of Mennonites of Swiss and South German origin along the Susquehanna River in Lancaster County, PA, that resulted in the forming of the River Brethren. Jacob Engle, assisted by his brother John, became the leader of the emerging River Brethren. In 1776 the River Brethren group was organized, and Jacob was made the first bishop. In the mid-1800s several groups split from the River Brethren, and the largest group took the name Brethren in Christ.

== Literature ==
- Morris M. Engle: History of the Engle Family in America 1754-1927, Hummelstown, PA, 1927.
