= Maximilian Engl =

German footballer

Max Engl
Personal information
- Full name: Maximilian Engl
- Date of birth: 31 December 1997 (age 28)
- Place of birth: Germany
- Height: 1.89 m (6 ft 2 in)
- Position: Goalkeeper

Team information
- Current team: Kickers Offenbach
- Number: 21

Youth career
- SC Fürstenfeldbruck
- 1. SC Gröbenzell
- –2016: 1860 Munich

Senior career*
Years	Team	Apps	(Gls)
2016–2017	1860 Munich II	19	(0)
2017	1860 Munich	0	(0)
2017–2018	Rot-Weiß Erfurt	1	(0)
2018–2019	VfR Garching	33	(0)
2019–2021	Türkgücü München	5	(0)
2021–2022	FC Augsburg II	25	(0)
2022–	Kickers Offenbach	8	(0)
- * Club domestic league appearances and goals as of 14:02, 29 August 2023 (UTC)

Maximilian Engl (born 31 December 1997) is a German professional footballer who plays as a goalkeeper for Kickers Offenbach.

== Career ==
Engl made his professional debut for Rot-Weiß Erfurt on 8 October 2017 in the Thuringian Cup, coming on as a substitute for Philipp Klewin in the 2–1 away loss against fellow 3. Liga club Carl Zeiss Jena.
