= Ursula Engelen-Kefer =

German politician

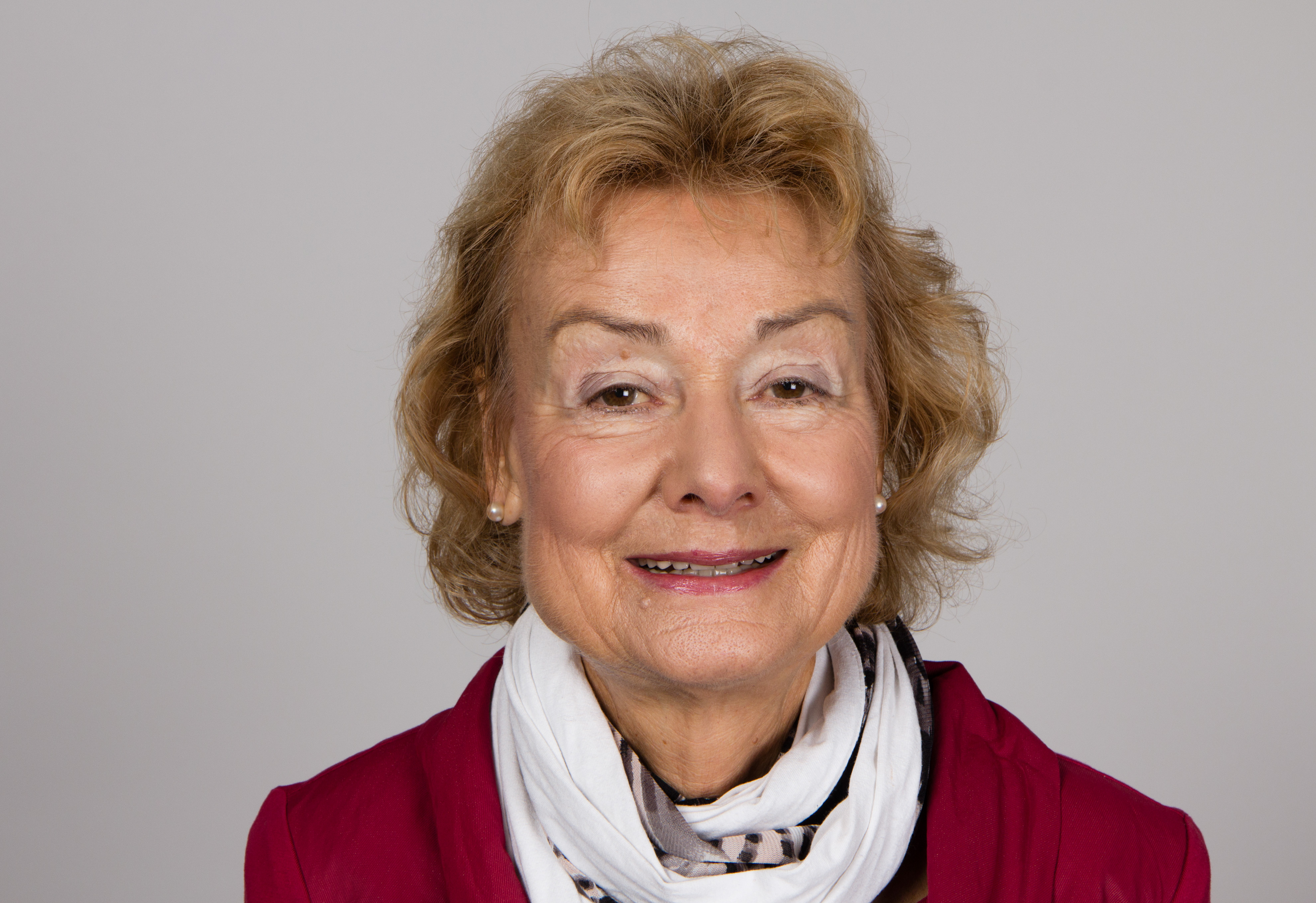
Ursula Engelen-Kefer (2014)

Ursula Engelen-Kefer (born 20 June 1943) is a German politician who held the position of Deputy Chairman of the German Confederation of Trade Unions (Deutscher Gewerkschaftsbund; DGB) from 1990 to 2006. She is currently a lecturer at the German Federal Employment Agency’s special training school Hochschule der Bundesagentur für Arbeit in Schwerin. She also teaches at the Free University of Berlin and chairs the Social Policy Working Group of the non-government organization Sozialverband Deutschland. From 1986 to 2009, Ursula Engelen-Kefer belonged to the 45-member „Executive Committee“ of the Social Democratic Party (SPD). She was chosen by the district of Ingolstadt, Eichstätt and Neuburg-Schrobenhausen to be its direct SPD candidate for the Bundestag in the last federal election (on September 27, 2009). In July 2009 she was elected as a member of the "Executive Committee" of the Social Democratic Party in Bavaria.

== Early life and education ==
Engelen-Kefer was born in Prague. She studied economics at Cologne University and got her doctorate with a thesis Retraining in a growing economy — the experience of the United States.

== Career ==
Engelen-Kefer started as a freelance journalist in New York and later joined the Economic and Social Science Institute of the DGB (Wirtschafts-und Sozialwissenschaftliches Institut des DGB). In 1974 she moved to the DGB as an expert for international social policy. From 1980 to 1984 she headed DGB’s department for labour market policy. In 1984, the Government of Chancellor Helmut Kohl appointed her Vice President of the German Federal Employment Administration (Bundesanstalt für Arbeit, BA), a position she held until 1990.

In 1990, the German Trade Union Federation Congress in Hamburg elected Ursula Engelen-Kefer as Deputy Chairman of the DGB. Re-elected three times, she held this position until May 2006. During that time she was alternate chairman of the managing board and later the supervisory board of Federal Employment Agency (BA). For several years she also chaired, on an alternate basis with the top employer representative, the German Social Security Administration (Deutsche Rentenversicherung Bund, formerly Verband Deutscher Rentenversicherungsträger). From 1985 to 2010, she was a member of the Committee for Social Order (Kammer für Soziale Ordnung) of the Evangelical Church in Germany (EKD). For two terms she represented the Unions in the EKD’s leading body (Synode), in the Senate of the Max Planck Society and in the ZDF Fernsehrat, the supervisory body of Germany’s second public television channel.

After Heinz-Werner Meyer, the DGB’s chairman, died shortly before the DGB Federal Congress in 1994, Engelen-Kefer had to assume the chairmanship on a temporary basis until Dieter Schulte, member of the Managing Board of IG Metall, was nominated and elected as new DGB chairman. After serving four terms, at the DGB Federal Congress in May 2006 in Berlin, Engelen-Kefer decided to stand again for election. In the election of the new DGB Managing Board on 23 May 2006, she was defeated by Ingrid Sehrbrock, a member of the Christian Democratic Union (CDU), who had been nominated by the chairmen of the eight unions that form the DGB. 161 delegates voted for Engelen-Kefer, 212 delegates voted for Ingrid Sehrbrock.

On the international stage, Engelen-Kefer was active in several institutions and bodies. She represented the DGB unions in the Governing Body of the International Labour Organization (ILO) from 1991 to 2008. She also was a member of the European Economic and Social Committee (EESC) of the European Union (1978 to 1986 and 1990 to 2006) and a member of the Consultative Committee of the European Social Fund (1974—1980). She was a member of the Executive Committee of the European Trade Union Confederation (ETUC; 1990—2006) and of the Executive Committee of the International Confederation of Free Trade Unions (ICFTU) from 1990 to 2006.

On 28 April 2010, the governing board (Senate) of the University of the German Federal Labour Agency (Hochschule der Bundesagentur für Arbeit), Mannheim and Schwerin, appointed Dr. Ursula Engelen-Kefer as a professor (honorary professorship) for "International and European Labour Market and Employment Policies" at the University of the German Federal Labour Agency, effective 1 April 2010.

== Recognition ==
Engelen-Kefer received the Order of Merit of the Federal Republic of Germany (Cross of Merit First Class) presented to her by the Minister of Labour, Norbert Blüm.

== Other activities ==
- Friedrich Ebert Foundation (FES), Member of the Board of Trustees

== Personal life ==
Engelen-Kefer is married to the economic journalist Klaus C. Engelen. The couple has two sons.
