= Ephraim Engleman =

American rheumatologist

Ephraim Engleman (March 24, 1911 – September 2, 2015) was an American rheumatologist and a Clinical Professor of Medicine at the University of California, San Francisco. He had a major national and international impact on rheumatology during more than six decades, and wrote more than one hundred scientific and medical papers.

Engleman received his B.S. from Stanford University in 1933 and his M.D. from Columbia University in 1937. He saw military service as a major during World War II, serving as chief of the U.S. Army’s Rheumatic Fever Center at Torney General Hospital. In 1942, he was one of two authors of the first English language medical article describing the triad of uveitis, urethritis, and arthritis and coined the eponym Reiter's syndrome (now known as reactive arthritis) after Dr. Hans Conrad Julius Reiter. In 1947, he joined the clinical faculty at UCSF and spent the remaining 68 years of his professional medical career there, with a national and international impact on the field of rheumatology.

From 1962-1963, Engleman was president of the American Rheumatism Association, now the American College of Rheumatology; president of the National Society of Clinical Rheumatology (1967-1969); president of the International League Against Rheumatism (1981-1985). In the latter position, he made several trips to mainland China and was influential in the creation of the Chinese Rheumatology Association. He also served as Chairman of the World Health Organization’s task force on arthritis and on several committees of the Natural Institutes of Health.

From 1975 to 1976, Engleman chaired the National Commission on Arthritis, a congressional mandated task force charged with recommending remedies for the inadequate status of arthritis research, teaching and patient care in the United States. The National Arthritis Plan, which summarized the commission’s recommendations, most of which were implemented, included the creation of what is now the National Institute of Arthritis, Musculoskeletal and Skin Diseases, and tripling of the ongoing federal budget for arthritis research. It also called attention to the surprising number of medical schools with no curriculum in rheumatology – a situation that changed quickly after the plan’s publication.

In 1979, Engleman became Founding Director of the Rosalind Russell Medical Research Center for Arthritis at UCSF. Its name has since changed. Engleman served as the Director of the Rosalind Russell/Ephraim P. Engleman Rheumatology Research Center at UCSF until his death in 2015.

Some of Engelman’s additional honors are recipient of the Medal of Honor at UCSF in 2002, “the most prestigious award given by UCSF”; recipient of the Presidential Gold Medal Award of the American College of Rheumatology, the highest national honor in the field of rheumatology; and recipient of Columbia College of Physicians and Surgeons Gold Medal for excellence in clinical medicine in 2007, the highest honor the school’s alumni association can bestow.

In 2007, while still practicing rheumatology and after Reiter's Nazi past became more widely known, Engleman went on record as calling for a replacement of the eponymous term for the disease with the name "reactive arthritis."

Engleman wrote a book of memoirs, My Century.

Active until his death, he was the longest-tenured professor of UCSF as of December 30, 2013.

In January 2013, he was believed to be the lone surviving member of Stanford University's Class of 1933.

Engleman died at the age of 104 on September 2, 2015 while at work as director of the Rosalind Russell/Ephraim P. Engleman Rheumatology Research Center at UCSF, which had been renamed in his honor the previous year. Engleman was survived by his two sons, daughter Jill Roost, six grandchildren and two great-grandchildren.

== Books ==
- The Arthritis Book: A Guide for Patients and Their Families. Painter Hopkins Publishers, 1979. ISBN 0-525-05850-8.
- My Century. Matthew Krieger, 2013. ISBN 0-615-82607-5.
