= Engels MI =

Floatplane

General information
- Type: fighter
- Designer: E.R. Engels
- Primary users: Soviet Air Force Imperial Russian Air Service
- Number built: 4

History
- Introduction date: 1920
- First flight: 1916
- Retired: 1920

The Engels MI was a Russian floatplane/fighter developed in 1916. It was a parasol cantilever flying boat with a V-Section hull, and downswept wingtips incorporating flotation chambers.

== Production history ==
In 1916 the Russian government expressed a need for a flying counter-float-plane against the German Albatros W.4. E.R. Engels came up with the Engels MI (Engels I).

The aircraft had an ash and pine fuselage covered in 3mm of plywood, and the wooden wings were cloth covered. The prototype was powered by a 100 hp Gnome Monosoupape engine and set a flying boat speed record of 170 kph at the Baku School of Maritime Aviation. On its third flight in December 1916 part of the right wing broke, sending the plane into the water. While the wreckage was quickly recovered, it took one and a half weeks to find the pilot's body. Despite the breakup accident, further tests were carried out and an order for 60 aircraft equipped with a Le Rhône 120 hp engine, the Engels II, was placed in April 1917 and after initial testing an order for 50 was placed on 27 April 1917. Only three production aircraft were completed before the project was dropped due to the Russian Revolution. By the time they were delivered to the Naval Aviation School in 1920 the planes were hopelessly outclassed.

== List of operators ==
Russian Empire

- Imperial Russian Air Service

Soviet Union

- Soviet Air Force

== Specifications ==
Data from The Complete Book of Fighters

General characteristics

- Crew: 1
- Length: 7.5 m (24 ft 7 in)
- Wingspan: 9 m (29 ft 6 in)
- Wing area: 14.2 m^{2} (153 sq ft)
- Empty weight: 385 kg (849 lb)
- Gross weight: 555 kg (1,224 lb)
- Powerplant: 1 × Gnome Monosoupape 9 Type B-2 9-cylinder air-cooled rotary piston engine, 75 kW (101 hp)
- Propellers: 2-bladed fixed-pitch pusher propeller

Performance

- Wing loading: 39.2 kg/m^{2} (8.0 lb/sq ft)
- Power/mass: 0.18 hp/kg

Armament

- Guns: 1 x fixed forward firing 7.62mm Maxim gun
