= Joseph Engleman =

English light music composer

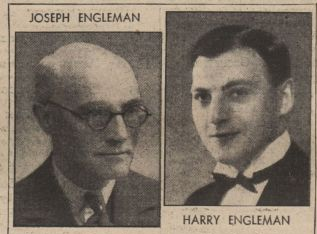
Joseph Engleman and his son Harry, in a 1933 edition of The Radio Times

Joseph Engleman (1881–1949), born Josef, was an English light music composer and viola player, active in Birmingham, England.

His son Harry was also a professional musician, initially in his father's orchestra.

== Career ==
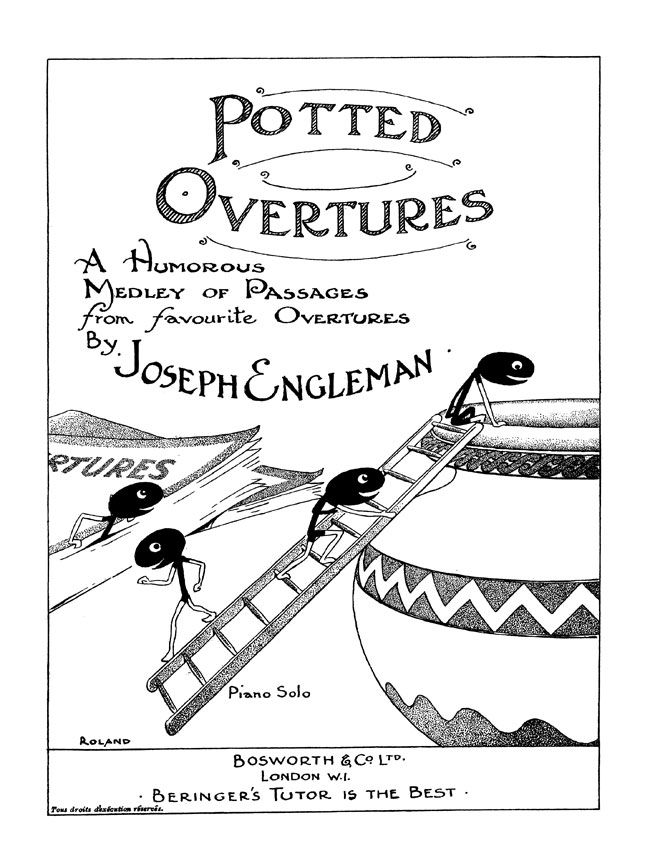
"Potted Overtures—A Humorous Medley of Passages from favourite Overtures by Joseph Engleman", sheet music. Artwork signed "Roland"

He was born in Birmingham, the son of the trombonist at the old Grand Theatre, Birmingham, and was largely self-taught. Engleman played viola in the City of Birmingham Orchestra, and played in cinemas as an accompanist for silent films.

As a composer he produced many light orchestral suites, and a ballet conducted by Adrian Boult in 1928. The piece Spectre was used as the signature tune to the 1940s weekly BBC Radio series The Armchair Detective with Ernest Dudley.

He also wrote library music, sometimes using the name John Harbury, and helped to found Bosworth’s mood music library in 1937. His film scores include Olympia St. Moritz (1948) and Kuckelikaka (1949). His entry in Who's Who in Music also lists a Symphony in E.

Engleman married Gertrude Owen, and there were two children, a son and a daughter. They lived at 43 Harbury Road, Cannon Hill, Birmingham.

== Harry Engleman ==
His son Harry Engleman (1912–2002) was a pianist, bandleader and composer whose syncopated piano style was greatly influenced by Billy Mayerl. From the age of 14 Harry played piano in his father's orchestra, and at various Birmingham cinemas. He was pianist with the Aston Hippodrome Orchestra and at other theatres, and from 1931 was a frequent broadcaster with his own Quintet and other groups.

Harry Engleman composed mostly songs and syncopated piano solos such as Cannon off the Cushion (1936), Chase the Ace (1936), Finger Prints (1936, a piece popularised by Billy Mayerl and the American Zez Confrey), Golden Chain, Snakes and Ladders, Skittles, and Summer Rain. Paul Guinery has recorded several of his pieces.

== Works ==
Joseph Engleman's works include:

=== Orchestral suites ===
- Ballet Suite: Le Miroir du Mademoiselle (fp. 1928)
- Children's Playtime
  - 'Hide and Seek'
  - 'Pick a Bag'
  - 'Marbles'
  - 'Ring O'Roses'
- A Cocktail Cabinet
  - 'Maiden's Blush'
  - 'Orange Blossom'
  - 'Manhattan'
- A Doll's House
- Four Olde English Inns
- In a Toyshop
- Potted Overtures, medley
- Suite Rustique
- Tales From a Fairy Book
  - 'Babes in the Wood'
  - 'Rumpelstiltskin'
  - 'Cinderella'
  - 'Ali Baba'
- Three American Sketches
- A Voyage to Lilliput

=== Other ===
- Air Raid Havoc (as John Harbury)
- Bass Business, intermezzo for double bass or bassoon or baritone saxophone with orchestra
- Blarney Stone, march
- Cat and Mouse, piano and orchestra
- Conspiracy, orchestra
- Elsa, waltz
- Fiddler's Folly, violin and orchestra
- Incognita
- Pizzicato Caprice
- Riviera Express
- Slippery Eel (aka Strutting About)
- The Spectre
- Tanks in Action (as John Harbury)
- 20 Fanfares, collection
- Yankee Doodle, galop
- The Wedding of Punch and Judy
