= Ton van Engelen =

Dutch footballer

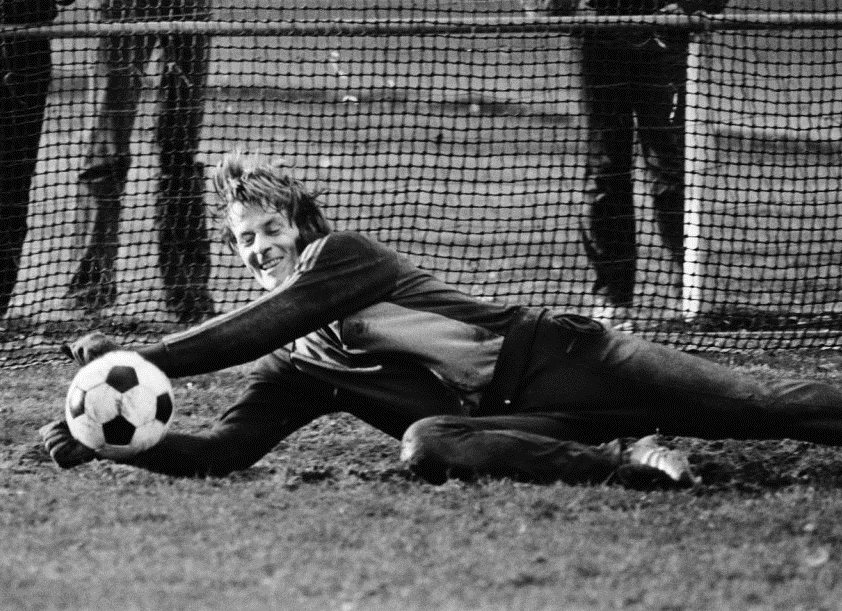
- Ton van Engelen playing for Feyenoord in 1979

Personal information
- Full name: Ton van Engelen
- Date of birth: 4 October 1950 (age 76)
- Place of birth: Vlijmen, Netherlands
- Position: Goalkeeper

Youth career
- Vlijmense Boys
- BVV
- RKVV Wilhelmina

Senior career*
Years	Team	Apps	(Gls)
1976–1979	PSV	21	(0)
1979–1984	Feyenoord	43	(0)
1982–1983	→ Go Ahead Eagles (loan)	13	(0)
Total		77	(0)
- * Club domestic league appearances and goals as of 6 June 2007 ‡ National team caps and goals as of 6 June 2007

Ton van Engelen (born 4 October 1950 in Den Bosch) is a Dutch retired footballer who played as a goalkeeper.

== Football career ==
Van Engelen made his professional debut for PSV, with whom he won a league title and a UEFA Cup medal and where he mainly was a reserve to iconic goalkeeper Jan van Beveren. He also played for Feyenoord and Go Ahead Eagles. At Feyenoord, he soon became second choice behind another Dutch international, Joop Hiele. He missed out on a European clash with Danish side Hvidovre though, when Hiele was deemed not fit enough. An injury to van Engelen gave third goalkeeper Hugo van Houten his European debut.

== Cycling ==
After his football career, he became a soigneur for various Dutch cycling teams. Since 1996 he has been working for the Rabobank team and in 2007 he was honoured by the organiser for being active in his twentieth Tour de France.

== Personal life ==
He is the father of Yvo van Engelen.

== Honours ==
PSV

- Eredivisie: 1
  - 1977-78
- UEFA Cup: 1
  - 1977–78

Feyenoord

- KNVB Cup: 1
  - 1979–80
- First match: 29 September 1976 : PSV Eindhoven - Dundalk FC, 6-0
