= Engels (inhabited locality) =

Engels (Russian: Э́нгельс) is the name of several inhabited localities in Russia.

Urban localities

- Engels, Saratov Oblast, a city in Saratov Oblast; administratively incorporated as a city of oblast significance
  - Engels-2 (air base), a nearby Russian Air Force base

Rural localities

- Engels, Orenburg Oblast, a settlement in Marksovsky Selsoviet of Alexandrovsky District of Orenburg Oblast
