= Engeln (surname) =

Engeln or von Engeln is a German surname. It is either a patronymic surname derived from the given name Engel or a toponymic surname named after one of the places named Engeln. Notable people with the surname include:

- Bill Engeln, American baseball umpire
- Gisela Engeln-Müllges, German mathematician, academic and artist
- Oscar von Engeln

== See also ==
- Engel, Engelen Van Engelen, Engelman, Engelmann, Engelmeier, Engeln, Engels, Engelsman, Engle, Engleman
