= Mary Tate Engels =

American novelist

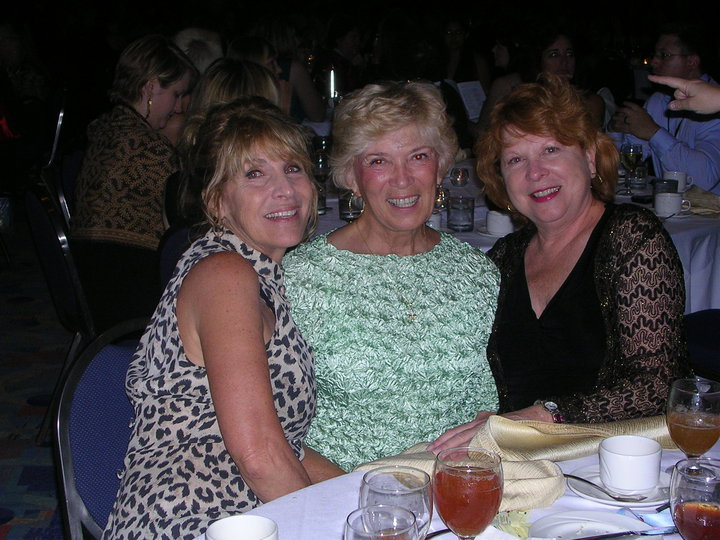
- Born: March 27, 1944 (age 82)
- Occupation: Novelist
- Writing career
- Pen name: Tate McKenna; Mary Tate Engels; Cory Kenyon (with Vicki Lewis Thompson); Corey Keaton (with Vicki Lewis Thompson)
- Period: 1982–present
- Genre: Romance
- Website: www.marytateengels.com

Mary Tate Engels (born March 27, 1943) is an American writer of almost thirty romance novels since 1982 as Tate McKenna and Mary Tate Engels. She has co-written five romance novels under the pseudonyms Cory Kenyon and Corey Keaton with Vicki Lewis Thompson and two non-fiction books for Texas Tech University Press. She lives with her husband in Tucson, Arizona.

== Bibliography ==
=== As Tate McKenna ===
==== Single Novels ====
- Captive Desire (1982)
- Legacy of Love (1983)
- Enduring Love (1983)
- Daring Proposal (1983)
- Love's Dawning (1984)
- The Perfect Touch (1984)
- Man of the Hour (1985)
- Love Is All That Matters (1985)
- A Wild and Reckless Love (1985)
- A Man to Remember (1986)
- Partners in Peril (1986)
- Sweet Revenge (1986)
- Island of Secrets (1987)
- Callahan's Gold (1987)

==== Hal Kammerman Series ====
1. Kindle the Fires (1983)
2. Two Separate Lives (1985)

==== Collections ====
- Legacy of Love / Captive Desire (1992)

=== As Mary Tate Engels ===
==== Single Novels ====
- Speak to the Wind 1988/08
- The Right Time 1989/03
- A Rare Breed 1992/11

==== New Mexico Series ====
1. Best-Laid Plans 1989/09
2. Ripe for the Picking 1990/03

==== Clements Saga ====
1. Hard to Resist 1991/06
2. Loved by the Best 1991/10

==== Non-Fiction ====
- Tales from Wide Ruins: Jean and Bill Cousins, Traders (1996)
- Corazón Contento: Sonoran Recipes and Stories from the Heart (1999) (with Madeline Gallego Thorpe)
