= Kunstforum International =

Kunstforum International is a bi-monthly magazine for contemporary art. Every issue has about 350 pages with a first part on a specific theme and in-depth articles on contemporary art, a part with interviews with artists and art professionals, a part with exhibition reviews, and essays.

== History ==
The magazine was established in 1973 in Cologne by Dieter Bechtloff and published in book-like form.
