= Oscar von Engeln =

Oskar Dietrich von Engeln
- Born: July 3, 1880
- Died: January 25, 1965 (aged 84)
- Occupation: Professor of Geology
- Spouse: Maude G. Hewitt

Academic background
- Education: Cornell University

Academic work
- Discipline: Geology
- Sub-discipline: Geomorphology

Oskar Dietrich von Engeln (July 3, 1880 – January 25, 1965) was a geologist and professor of geology best known for his study of geomorphology and the topography of New York State's Finger Lakes region.

== Early life and career ==
Von Engeln was admitted to Cornell as an undergraduate in 1904. While there, he studied under Ralph Stockman Tarr, the noted professor of geography. He was a student assistant to Tarr during a 1909 expedition to Alaska, serving as photographer to document findings.

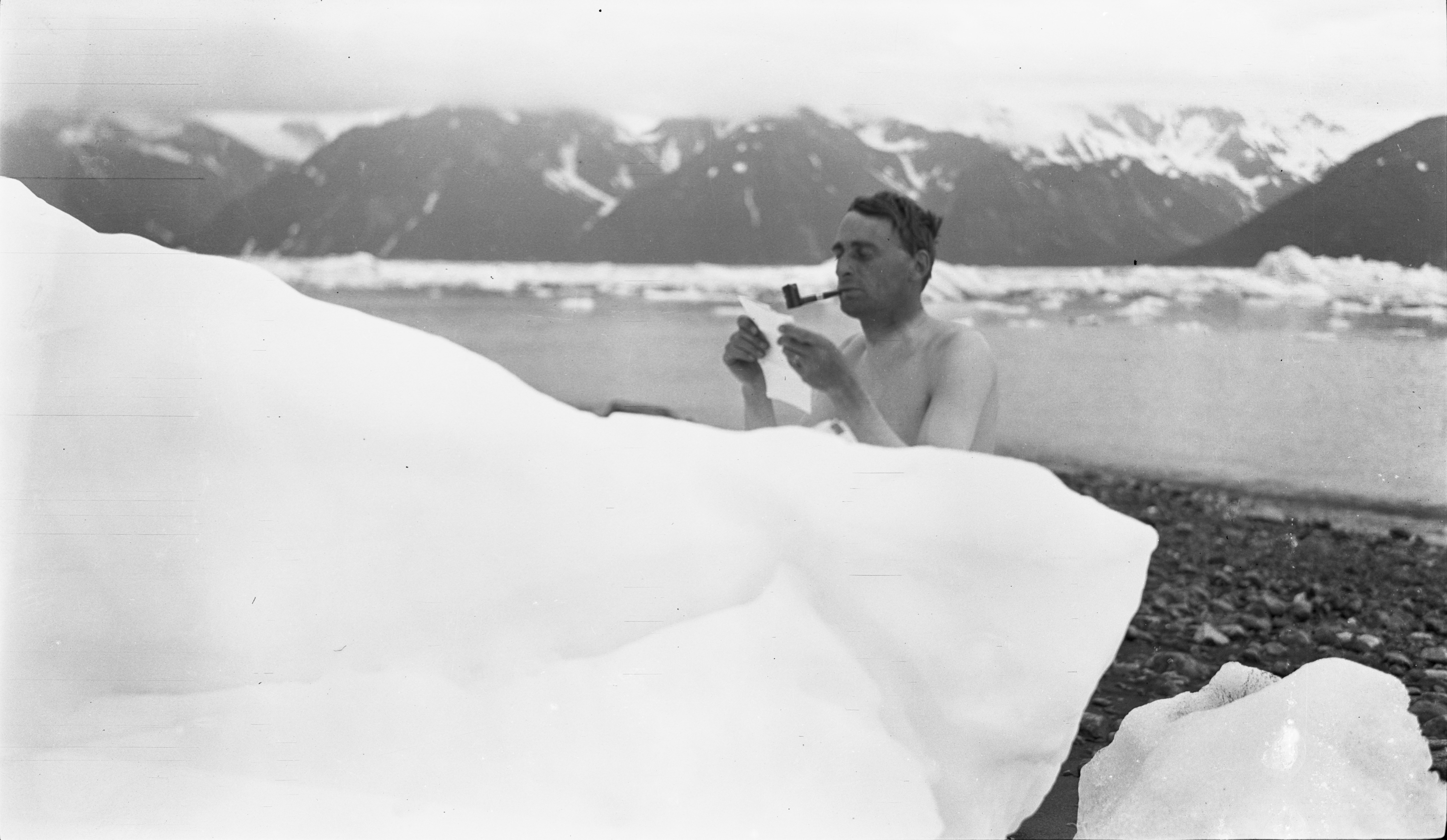
von Engeln in Alaska during a 1909 expedition

In 1911, von Engeln completed his doctoral dissertation at Cornell with a study of glacier drainage at Alaska's Mount Saint Elias and the surrounding Yakutat Bay region.

== Legacy ==
The O.D. von Engeln Preserve in Dryden, New York is named in honor of von Engeln.
