= Admiral Engel =

Admiral Engel may refer to:

- Arthur B. Engel (1914–1992), U.S. Coast Guard rear admiral
- Benjamin F. Engel (1914–1983), U.S. Coast Guard vice admiral
- Joan Marie Engel (born 1940), U.S. Navy rear admiral
