= Engelmeier =

Engelmeier is a German surname.

- Bruno Engelmeier
- Michaela Engelmeier
- Pyotr Engelmeyer (1855–1942), Russian engineer of German descent

== See also ==
- Engel, Engelen, Engelman, Engelmann, Engeln, Engels, Engelsman, Engle, Engleman, Engelmeier
