= Thomas M. Engel =

Canadian lawyer (born 1953)

Tom Engel, LL.B. (born 1953) is a Canadian lawyer practicing criminal defence in Alberta.

He did his undergraduate studies at the University of Alberta and graduated from the Faculty of Law at the University of Calgary.

He received the 2004 Harradence Prize from the Alberta Criminal Trial Lawyers Association, which recognizes exceptional lawyers known for challenging police misconduct. He also received the Human Rights Award from the John Humphrey's Centre for Peace and Human Rights in 2012.
