= Pyotr Engelmeyer =

Russian engineer

Pyotr Klimentievich Engelmeyer (Russian: Пётр Климентьевич Энгельмейер; 10 April 1855 – 7 July 1942) was a Russian engineer and philosopher of technology and positivism.

Engelmeyer (German: Engelmeier) was of German origin.

Engelmeyer was in correspondence with the Austrian physicist and philosopher of science Ernst Mach. He informed Mach of his growing influence in Russia, affecting such scientists as Nikolay Yegorovich Zhukovsky.

Engelmeier regarded all human activity as falling into three major categories: scientific, artistic and technical.

== Monographs and pamphlets ==
- Энгельмейер П. К. Экономическое значение современной техники. — М.: Русская типолитография, 1887. — 51 с.
- Энгельмейер П. К. Изобретения и привилегии. Руководство для изобретений. — М., 1897. — 176 с.
- Энгельмейер П. К. Технический итог XIX-го века". Вып. 1. — М.: Тип. К. А. Казначеева, 1898.
- Энгельмейер П. К. Критика научных и художественных взглядов гр. Л. Н. Толстого. — М., 1898. — 72 с.
- Энгельмейер П. К. Технический итог XIX-го века. Вып.2. — М.:Тип. К. А. Казначеева, 1898. — 107 с.
- Энгельмейер П. К. «Философия техники» — основная работа Петра Климентьевича, впервые изданная в 1912 году, состоящая из четырёх выпусков:
  - В первом выпуске давалось общее содержание предмета. Вып. 1. — 96 с.
  - Второй выпуск был посвящён анализу философских проблем. Вып. 2. — 160 с.,
  - Третий выпуск включал в себя проблемы жизни и носил название «Наша жизнь». Вып. 3. — 94 с.
  - Четвёртый выпуск («Техницизм») определяет творение человеком искусственного мира.
- Энгельмейер П. К. Париж-Москва на автомобиле. — М., 1909. — 180 с.
- Энгельмейер П. К. Теория творчества. — СПб.: Образование, 1910. — 210 с.
- Энгельмейер П. К. Руководство к привилегированию изобретений. — СПб.: Образование, 1911.
- Энгельмейер П. К. Творческая личность и среда в области технических изобретений. — СПб.: Образование, 1911. — 116с.
- Энгельмейер П. К. Автомобиль. Мотоциклет. Моторная лодка. — М., 1912. — 215 с.
- Энгельмейер П. К. В защиту общих идей в технике. — 1915.
- Энгельмейер П. К. Катехизис шофера. — М., 1916. — 22 с.
- Энгельмейер П. К. Конспект лекций по философии техники. Ч. 1. История техники. — Баку, 1922
- Энгельмейер П. К. Как надо и не надо изобретать. Конспект лекций с диапозитивами. — М, 1925.
- Энгельмейер П. К., Укше Б. А., Веселовский М. Н. Моторная лодка. — М-Л.: Гос. изд-во, 1930. — 94 с.
