= Engl =

Engl or Engl. may refer to:

- England, a country that is part of the United Kingdom
- English
- Engl (surname), a German surname
- Engl., taxonomic abbreviation for botanist Adolf Engler
