= Vlijmen =

- Town
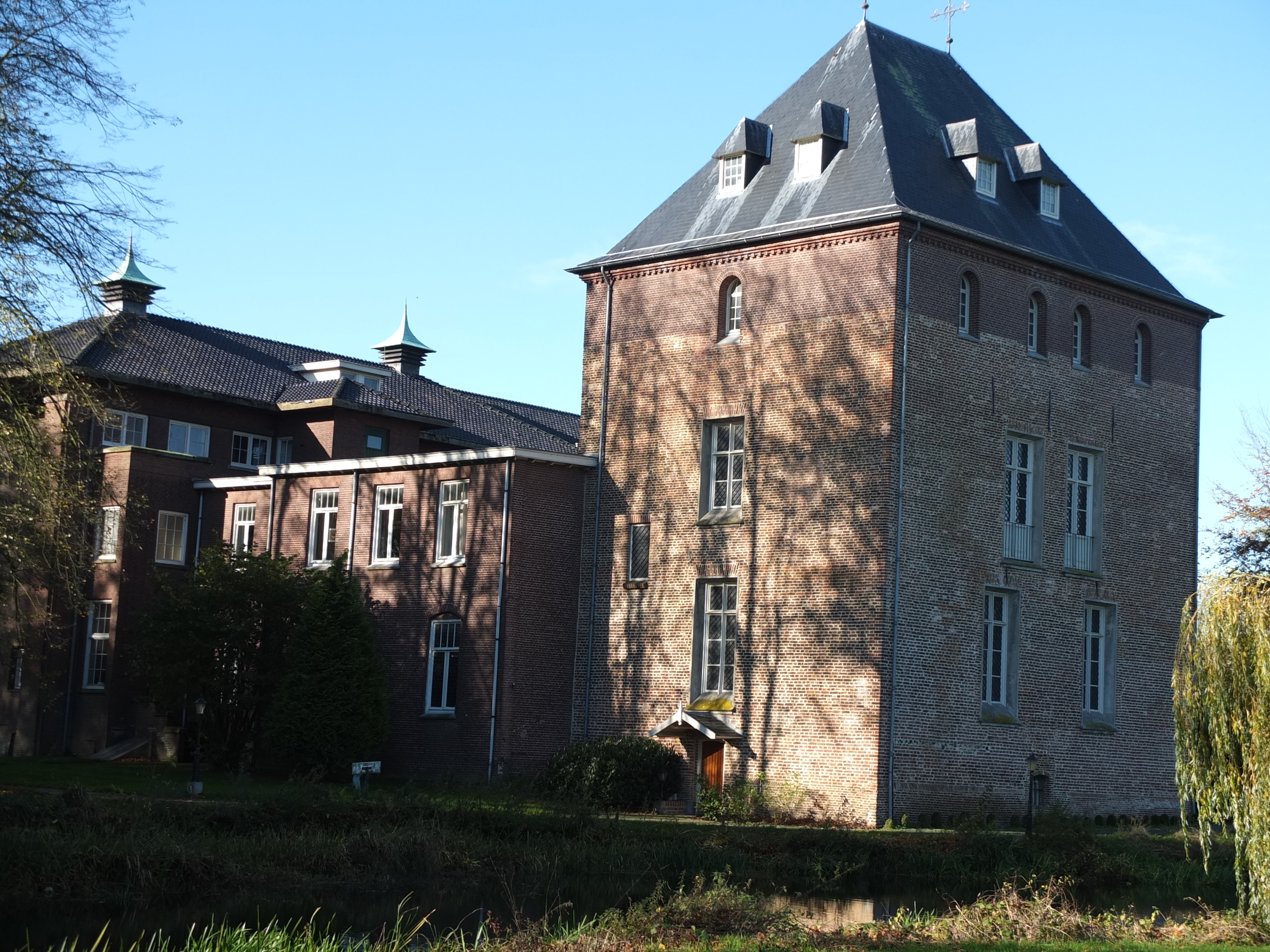
- Abbey Mariënkroon

- Flag Coat of arms

- Location in the province of North Brabant in the Netherlands Vlijmen (Netherlands)
- Coordinates: 51°41′43″N 5°12′43″E
- Country: Netherlands
- Province: North Brabant
- Municipality: Heusden

Area
  - Total: 13.63 km^{2} (5.26 sq mi)
- Elevation: 5 m (16 ft)

Population (2021)
  - Total: 15,145
  - Density: 1,111/km^{2} (2,878/sq mi)
- Time zone: UTC+1 (CET)
  - Summer (DST): UTC+2 (CEST)
- Postal code: 5251
- Dialing code: 073
- Major roads: A59

Vlijmen (Dutch pronunciation: [ˈvlɛimə(n)]) is a town in the Dutch province of North Brabant. It is located in the municipality of Heusden, about 6 km west of 's-Hertogenbosch.

Vlijmen was a separate municipality between 1821 and 1997. It was created from part of the former municipality Vlijmen en Engelen. After Haarsteeg and Nieuwkuijk were added to it in 1935, Vlijmen as municipality ceased to exist when it became part of Heusden in 1997.

== Notable people ==
- Michael van Gerwen, professional darts player
- Lars Boom, professional cyclist

== Gallery ==
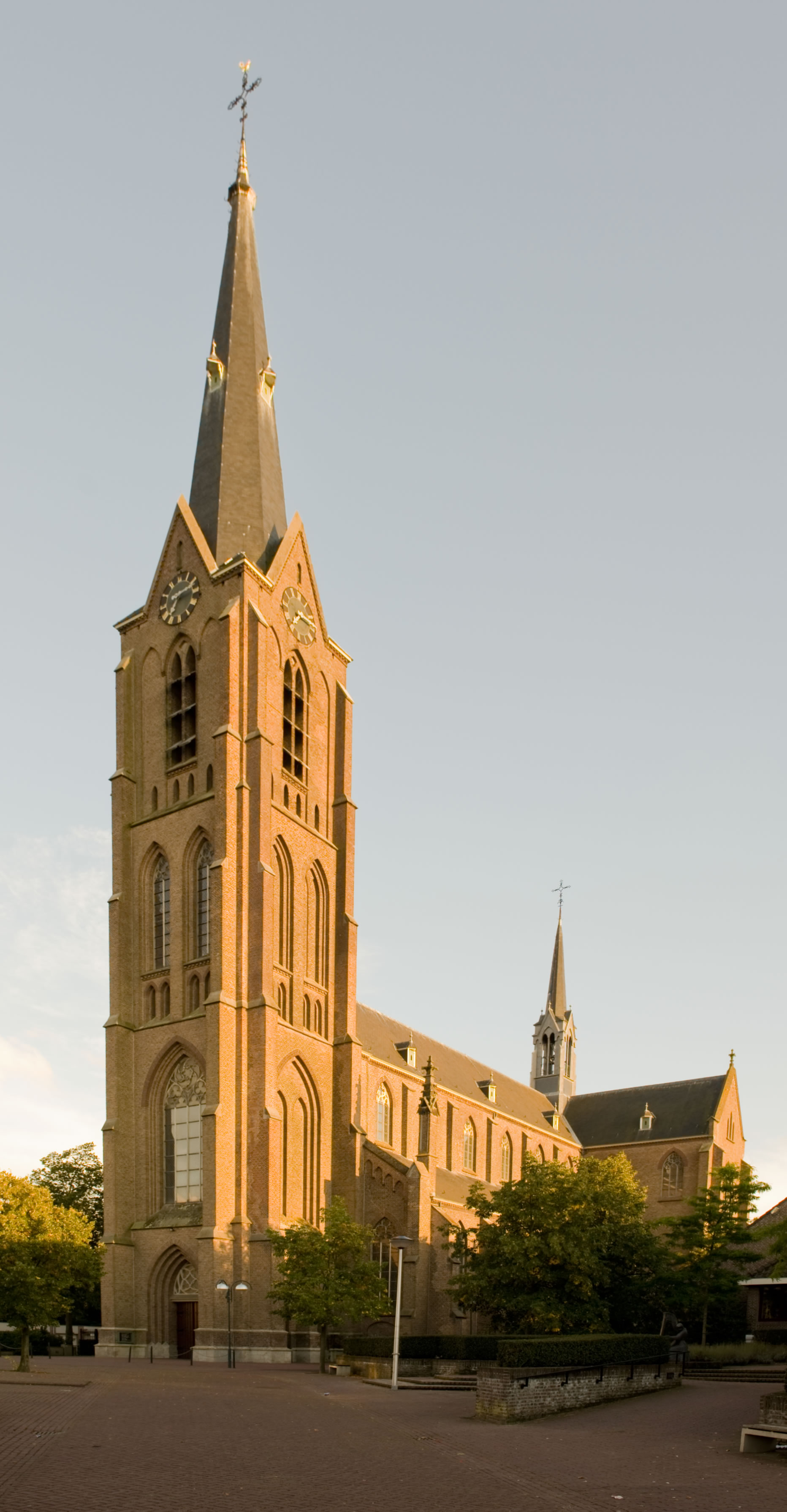
Church

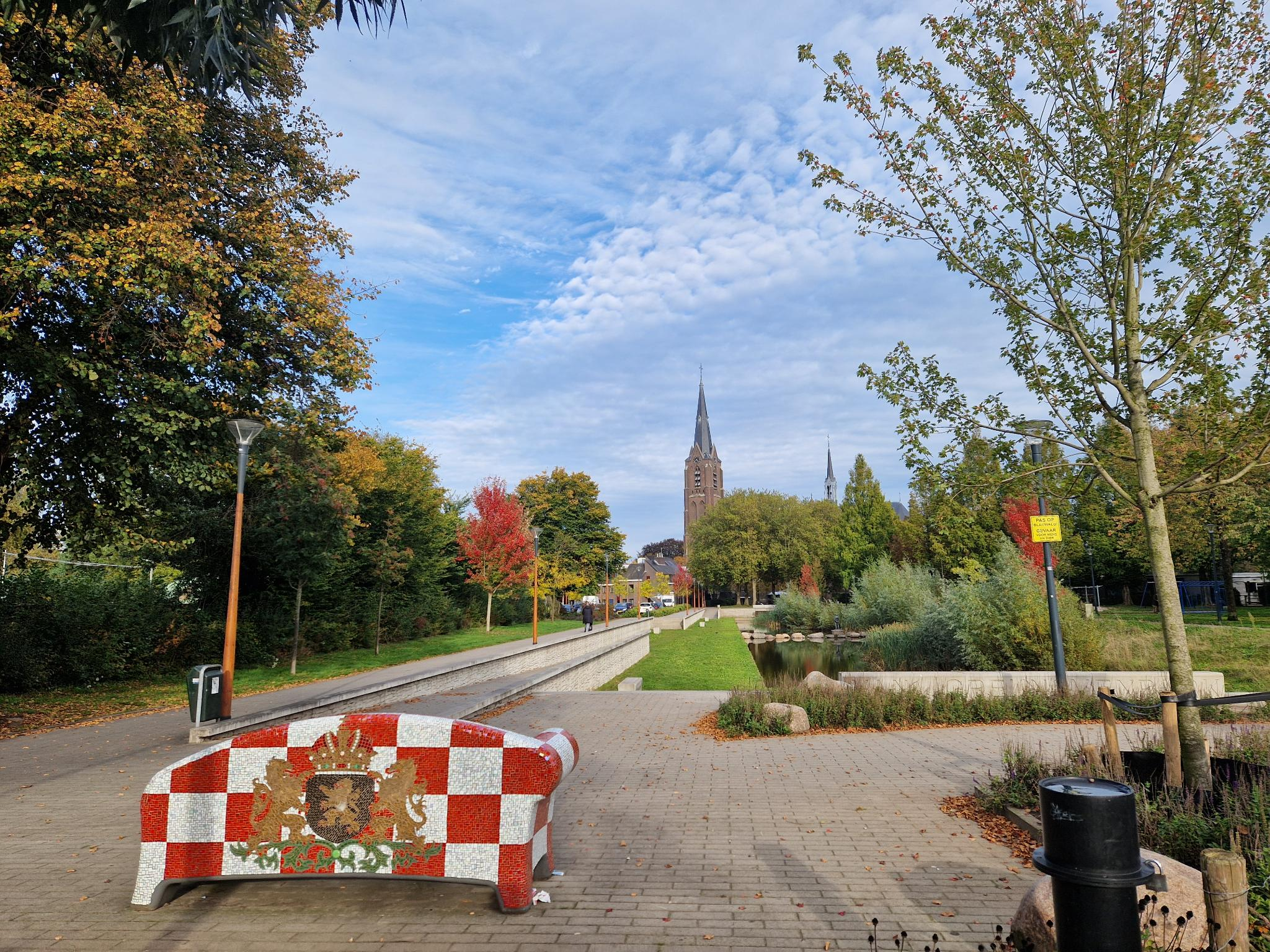
Van Greunsvenpark

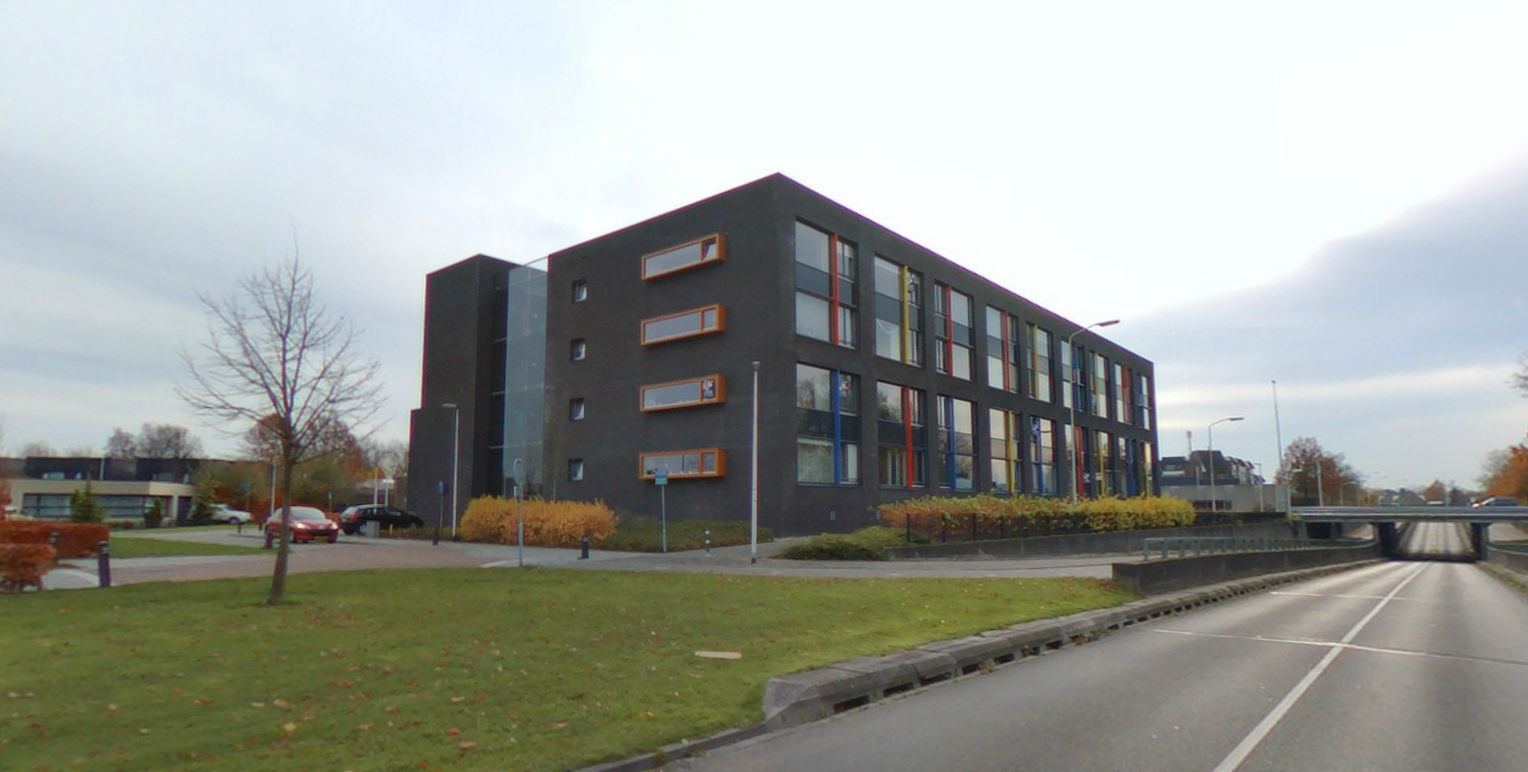
Apartments

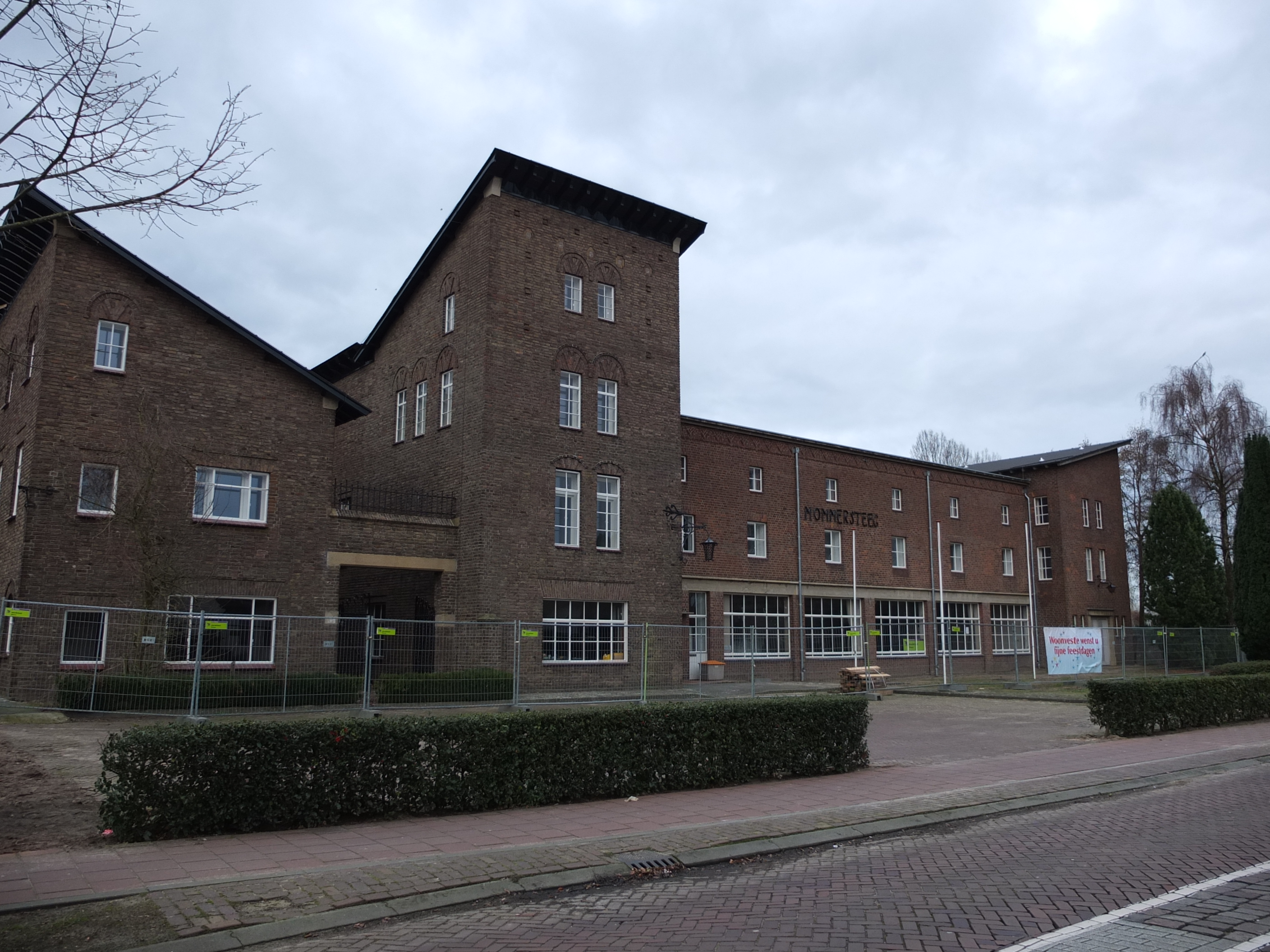
Building Vlijmen
