= Peter Engels =

- Education: University of Hannover
- Scientific career
- Fields: Physics; Atomic Physics; Ultracold Atoms
- Workplaces: Washington State University
- Thesis: Lithography and matter wave optics with laser cooled atomic beams
- Doctoral advisor: Wolfgang Ertmer and Klaus Sengstock
- Website: physics.wsu.edu/people/faculty/peter-engels/

Peter Engels is a professor of physics at the Washington State University, who conducts research in the field of ultracold atomic gases. He was elected a Fellow of the American Physical Society in 2016 for "pioneering experimental studies in superfluid hydrodynamics and other work in Bose-Einstein condensation." His group at WSU performs a variety of experiments involving quantum hydrodynamics, spin–orbit coupling (See Spin–orbit interaction), soliton formation, condensed matter physics, and more using Rb-87 (bosonic) and K-40 (fermionic). In collaboration with the theorists Prof. Michael Forbes, Yongping Zhang, and Thomas Busch, his team published research demonstrating negative mass hydrodynamics in a spin–orbit coupled Bose–Einstein condensate.
