= Engle (surname) =

Engle is a surname. Notable people with the surname include:

- Addie C. Strong Engle (1845–1926), American writer and publisher
- Clair Engle (1911–1964), American politicianfrom California
- Clara Engle (1913–2003), American nurse and medical missionary in Turkey
- Claude Engle, American engineer and lecturer
- Stephen Decatur Engle (1837–1921), American inventor and clockmaker
- Claude L'Engle (1868–1919), American politician from Florida
- Clyde Engle (1884–1939), American baseball player and coach
- Dave Engle (born 1956), American baseball player
- Debra Engle (1953–2023), American actress, known for The Golden Girls and The Golden Palace
- Frank L. Engle (1916-2002), American sculptor
- Jacob Engle (1753–1854), River Brethren leader
- Joe Engle (born 1932), American astronaut
- Joel Engle, American musician
- Karen Engle, American lawyer
- Kerstin Engle (born 1947), Swedish politician
- Lavinia Engle (1892–1979), American suffragette and politician
- Madeleine L'Engle (1918–2007), American author of children's books
- Margie Goldstein-Engle (born 1958), American equestrian
- Paul Engle (1908–1991), American poet and author
- Randall Engle, American psychologist
- Rip Engle (1906–1983), American college football coach
- Robert F. Engle (born 1942), American economist, Nobel prize winner
- Vanessa Engle (born c. 1962), British documentary filmmaker
- Jacob Engle (born 1974), American investor

== See also ==
- Engel, Engelen Van Engelen, Engelman, Engelmann, Engelmeier, Engeln, Engels, Engelsman, Engle, Engleman
