= Engels (surname) =

Engels is a German and Dutch patronymic surname. Notable people with the surname include:

- Addy Engels (born 1977), Dutch swimmer
- Arne Engels (born 2003), Belgian footballer
- Björn Engels (born 1994), Belgian footballer
- Craig Engels (born 1994), American middle-distance runner
- David Engels (born 1979), Belgian historian
- Dieter Engels (born 1950), German judge and legal scholar
- Floortje Engels (born 1982), Dutch field hockey player
- Friedrich Engels (1820–1895), German social scientist and philosopher
- Gert Engels (born 1957), German footballer
- Grégory Engels (born 1976), German politician and activist
- Horus Engels (1914–1991), German painter
- Jaco Engels (born 1980), Namibian rugby player
- Jan Engels (1922–1972), Belgian road bicycle racer
- Johann Caspar Engels (1753–1821), German manufacturer
- John Engels (1931–2007), American poet
- Julian Engels (né Büscher; born 1993), German former footballer
- Lisl Engels (1916–2006), Austrian painter
- Ludwig Engels (1905–1967), German–Brazilian chess master
- Marc Engels, Belgian film sound engineer
- Mareike Engels (born 1988), German politician
- Mario Engels (born 1993), German footballer
- Mary Tate Engels (born 1943), American romance writer
- Michel Engels (1851–1901), Luxembourgish illustrator and painter
- Peter Engels, American physicist
- Piet Engels (1923–1994), Dutch politician
- Richard Engels, American politician from South Dakota
- Rick Engles (born 1954), American football player
- Robert Engels (1866–1926), German artist
- Robert Engels (born 1949), American writer, producer, and director
- Sarah Engels (born 1992), German pop singer and television personality
- Stefaan Engels (born 1961), Belgian marathoner and triathlete
- Stefan Engels (born 1967), German organist
- Stephan Engels (born 1960), German footballer
- Wera Engels (1905–1988), German actress
- Werner Engels (1901–1934), German Nazi member assassinated at the Night of the Long Knives
- Wolfgang Engels (born 1943), East German defector

== See also ==
- Engel, Engelen, Van Engelen, Engelman, Engelmann, Engelmayer, Engelmeyer, Engelmeier, Engeln, Engels, Engelsman, Engle, Engleman
