= Engelmann (surname) =

Engelmann is a German surname. Notable people with the surname include:

- Eduard Engelmann Jr. (1864–1944), Austrian figure skater, engineer, and cyclist
- Fabien Engelmann (1979–), French politician
- Franklin Engelmann (1908–1972), British radio personality, popular in the 1950s and 1960s
- George Engelmann (1809–1884), German-American botanist
- George Julius Engelmann (1847–1903), American obstetrician and gynecologist
- Godefroy Engelmann (1788–1839), Franco-German lithographer
- Helene Engelmann (1898–1985), Austrian figure skater
- Hugo O. Engelmann (1917–2002), American sociologist, anthropologist, and general systems theorist
- Johannes Engelmann (1832–1912), Baltic German jurist
- Paul Engelmann (1891–1965), Jewish-Austrian architect
- Peter Engelmann (1823–1874), German American educationist and writer
- Theodor Wilhelm Engelmann (1843–1909), German botanist, physiologist, microbiologist, university professor, and musician
- Thorsten Engelmann (b. 1981), German rower

== See also ==
- Engel, Engelen Van Engelen, Engelman, Engelmann, Engelmeier, Engeln, Engels, Engelsman, Engle, Engleman
- Engelmann (disambiguation)
