= Engelman =

Engelman is a surname. Notable people with the surname include:

- Anthony Engelman, Australian actor
- Charlie Engelman, host of the Weird but True! American educational children's television series and Kirby Engelman's brother
- Donald Engelman (born 1941), biochemist
- Edmund Engelman (1907–2000), Austrian-American photographer and engineer
- Kirby Engelman, co-host of Weird but True! and Charlie Engelman's sister
- Robert Engelman, American writer
- Virginia Dehn (née Engleman; 1922–2005), American painter and printmaker

== See also ==
- Volfas Engelman, Lithuanian brewery
- Engel, Engelen, Van Engelen, Engelman, Engelmann, Engelmayer, Engelmeyer, Engelmeier, Engeln, Engels, Engelsman, Engle, Engleman
