= Engelsman =

Engelsman or Engelschman is a German or Dutch ethnonymic surname meaning "Englishman". Notable people with this name include:

- Bartholomeus Engelsman, Dutch name for Bartholomeus Anglicus (beg.1203–1272), French music theorist and entomologist
- Han Engelsman (1919–1990), Dutch footballer
- Henk Engelsman (1914–1979), Dutch Labour Party politician
- Jan Maertz Engelsman (1593–1654), Dutch glass painter and member of the Hoorn city council
- Michelle Engelsman (born 1979), Australian freestyle swimmer
- Nico Engelschman (1913–1988), Dutch stage actor, LGBT rights activist and World War II resistance member

== See also ==
- Engel, Engelen, Engelman, Engelmann, Engeln, Engels, Engelsman, Engle, Engleman
