= Hees =

Hees may refer to:

== Name ==
- Hees, surname
  - Bernardo Hees, Brazilian businessman
  - George Hees (1910 – 1996), Canadian politician and businessman
  - Thomas Hees (1634 – 1693), Dutch diplomat
- van Hees, Dutch surname meaning "from Hees"

== Location ==
- Hees, a village in Bilzen
- Hees, Nijmegen, former village and a neighborhood in the Dutch city of Nijmegen, the Netherlands
- Origins of the surname van Hees
  - Heesch
  - Heeze
  - Heeswijk

== See also ==
- Hee (disambiguation)
- Van Hee, surname
