= Loosbroek =

- Village
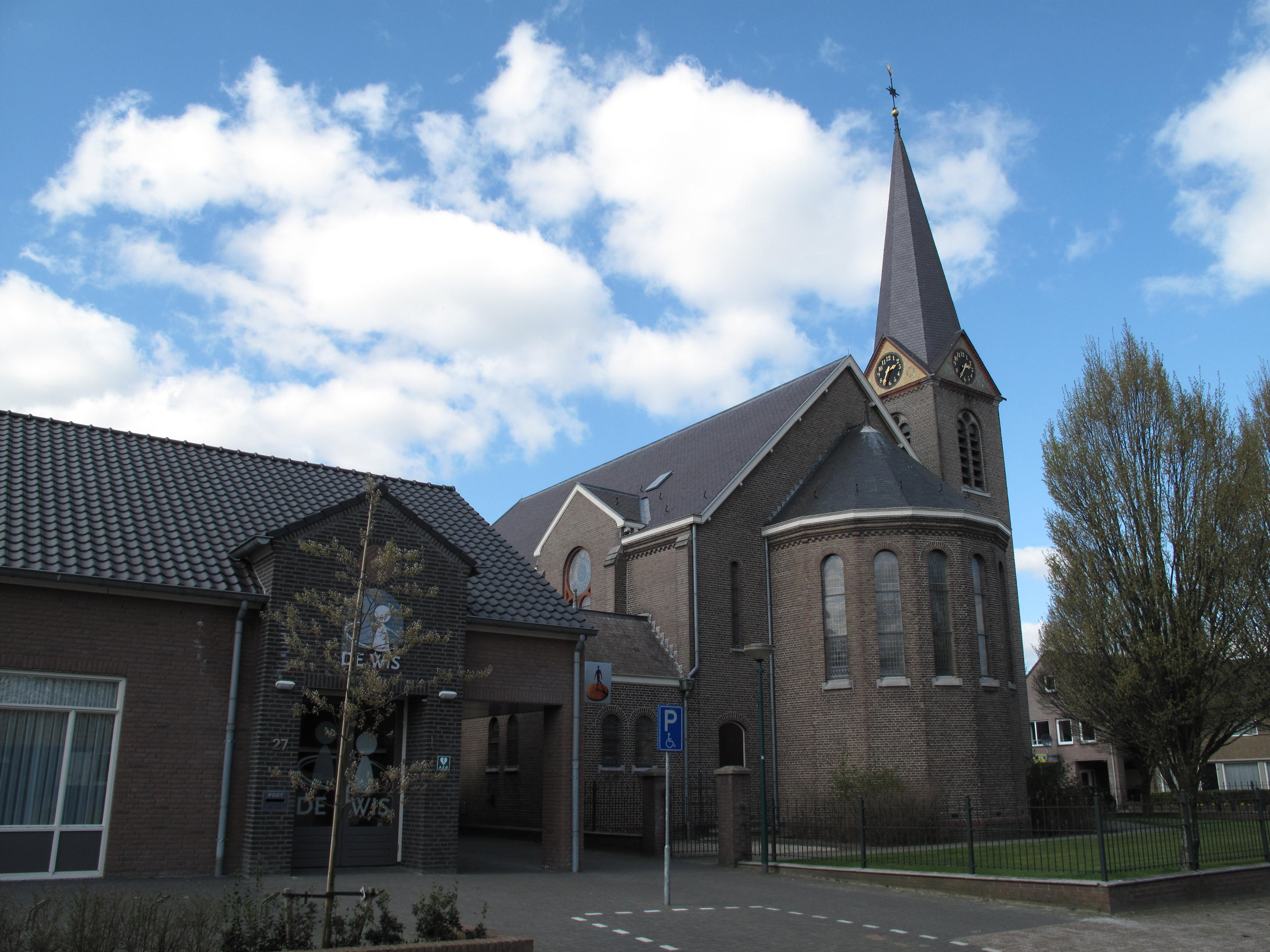
- Church of Loosbroek

- Location in the province of North Brabant in the Netherlands Loosbroek (Netherlands)
- Coordinates: 51°41′0″N 5°30′0″E
- Country: Netherlands
- Province: North Brabant
- Municipality: Bernheze

Area
  - Total: 0.55 km^{2} (0.21 sq mi)
- Elevation: 8 m (26 ft)

Population (2021)
  - Total: 1,015
  - Density: 1,800/km^{2} (4,800/sq mi)
- Time zone: UTC+1 (CET)
  - Summer (DST): UTC+2 (CEST)
- Postal code: 5472
- Dialing code: 0413
- Major roads: A50, N279

Loosbroek is a village and parish in the southern Netherlands. It is located in the municipality Bernheze, North Brabant.

Before 1994 the territory of Loosbroek was divided between three municipalities, Nistelrode, Heesch and Heeswijk-Dinther.

== History ==
The village was first mentioned in 1196 as "paludis que vocatur Loesbruch", and means "empty swampy land".

In 1648, after the Protestant Reformation, Loosbroek became part of the States of Brabant within the Meierij van 's-Hertogenbosch. In 1795 the French invaded the Dutch Republic and "freedom of faith" was restored in Loosbroek. In 1814 Loosbroek became part of the Kingdom of the Netherlands.

On 23 September 1923, two American officers and participants in the Gordon Bennett Cup crashed near Loosbroek when lightning struck their gas balloon. They had departed form Brussels. The gas balloon race was a disaster because three balloons were struck by lightning. Five people died and one person was severely injured.

Loosbroek was home to 256 people in 1840. Until 1898 Loosbroek was part of the parish of Dinther. In that year the village was allowed to start their own parish.

== Attractions ==
- The Saint-Antoniuskerk opened in 1913. The neo-romantic design is by Jos Margry; The priest at that time was Albertus Werners. In 2005 the church was restored. Outside the church is a painted stone statue of the Saint Donatus of Muenstereifel.
- The Bleeken is a nature resort to the North-West of Loosbroek. The area is known for its badgers.
- To the west of Loosbroek is a fresh water reservoir of 30 acres. The area is free accessible.

== Towns nearby ==
Nistelrode, Dinther, Heeswijk, Vorstenbosch, Kaathoven
