= Hee =

Hee or HEE may refer to:

== Acronyms ==
- Health Education England
- Heliocentric Earth Ecliptic, a solar coordinate system centred on the Sun and aligned with the Earth's orbital plane

== Places ==
- Hee, Denmark, a village located in the Ringkøbing-Skjern Municipality
- Hee, Netherlands, a small village in the island of Terschelling, Netherlands
- HEE, the IATA code for Thompson-Robbins Airport

== Surname ==
- Clayton Hee (born 1953), Native Hawaiian politician
- Hon Chew Hee (1906–1993), American Hawaiian muralist, watercolorist, and printmaker
- Marjorie Wong Hee (1905–1981) American Hawaiian painter, and teacher
- Mavis Hee (born 1974), Singaporean singer
- Thornton Hee (1911–1988), American animator

== Given name ==
- Hee (Korean name)
- Hyun Hee (born 1976), South Korean épée fencer
- Kong Hee (born 1964), founder of City Harvest Church

== See also ==
- Hees (disambiguation)
- Van Hee, surname
- van Hees, Dutch surname
