= Heeswijk =

- Village
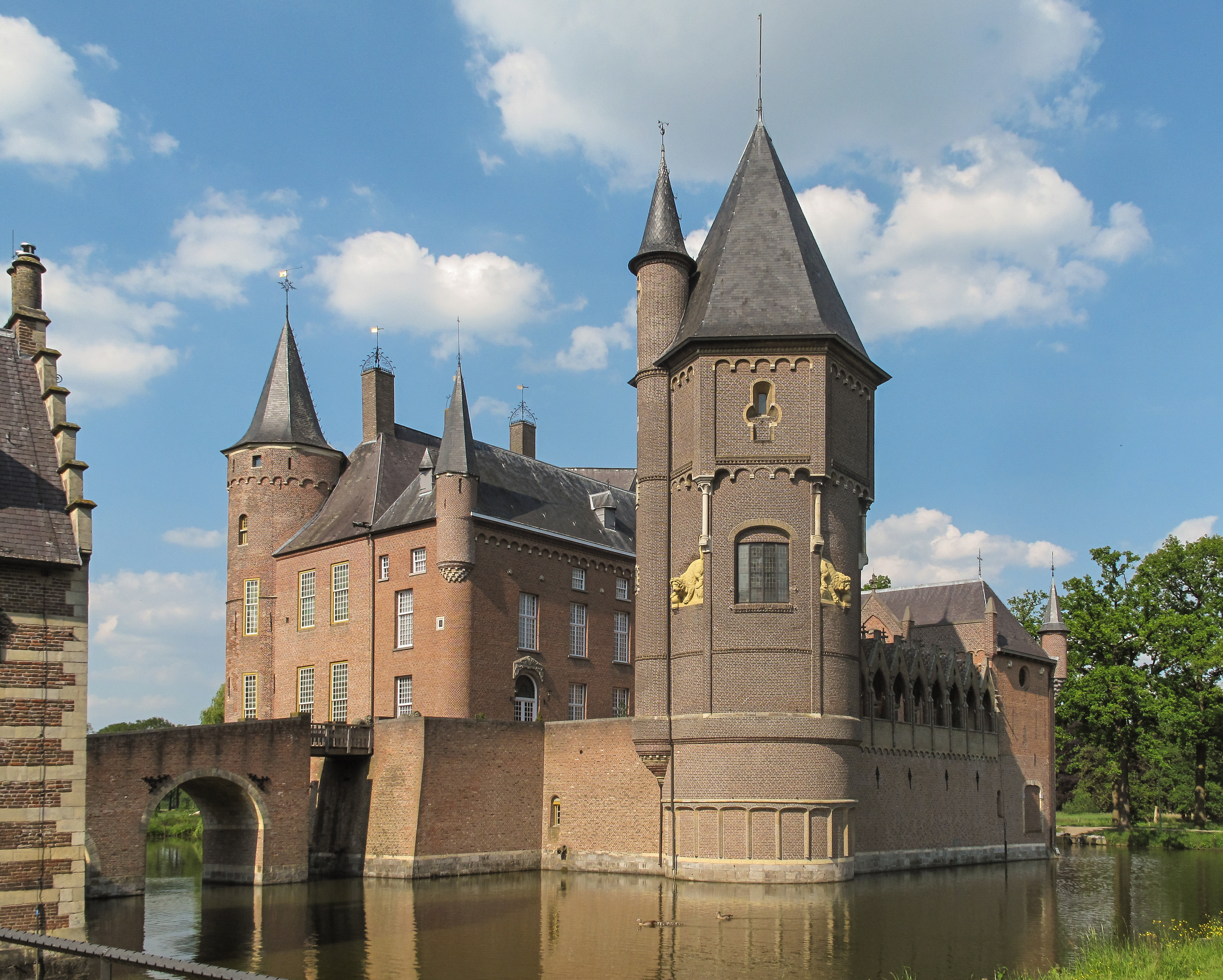
- Heeswijk Castle

- Coat of arms

- Location in the province of North Brabant in the Netherlands Heeswijk (Netherlands)
- Coordinates: 51°39′5″N 5°29′0″E
- Country: Netherlands
- Province: North Brabant
- Municipality: Bernheze

Area
  - Total: 2.91 km^{2} (1.12 sq mi)
- Elevation: 8 m (26 ft)

Population (2021)
  - Total: 6,580
  - Density: 2,260/km^{2} (5,860/sq mi)
- Time zone: UTC+1 (CET)
  - Summer (DST): UTC+2 (CEST)
- Postal code: 5473
- Dialing code: 0413
- Major roads: A50, N279

Heeswijk is a Dutch village. It is located in the province of North Brabant, in the south of the Netherlands.

== History ==
The village was first mentioned in the 12th century as "Albertus de Essuic", and means "settlement in the shrubbery". Heeswijk is a stretched out settlement in the valley of brook and dates from the Early Middle Ages.

The Premonstratensian abbey was established in the late-12th century as an outpost of the Berne Abbey. In 1546, "Het Slotje" was built for the monks as an L-shaped building with a square tower in the corner. After the Berne Abbey was dissolved in 1648, some monks moved to the Land van Ravenstein, an enclave of Palatinate-Neuburg within the Dutch Republic, and founded a new abbey in Heeswijk. Between 1857 and 1868, a neoclassic monastery was built and a wing was added between the old and new buildings.

The Catholic St Willibrordus Church was built between 1895 and 1896. The tower was damaged during World War II and replaced after the war. Heeswijk Castle was originally built in the 12th century. In 1835, it was nearly doubled in size by Baron van den Bogaerde.

Heeswijk was home to 225 people in 1840. Heeswijk was a separate municipality until 1969, when it merged with the adjacent village of Dinther. Since 1 January 1994 it has been part of the larger municipality of Bernheze, which comprises Heesch, Heeswijk-Dinther, Loosbroek, Nistelrode and Vorstenbosch.,

== Gallery ==
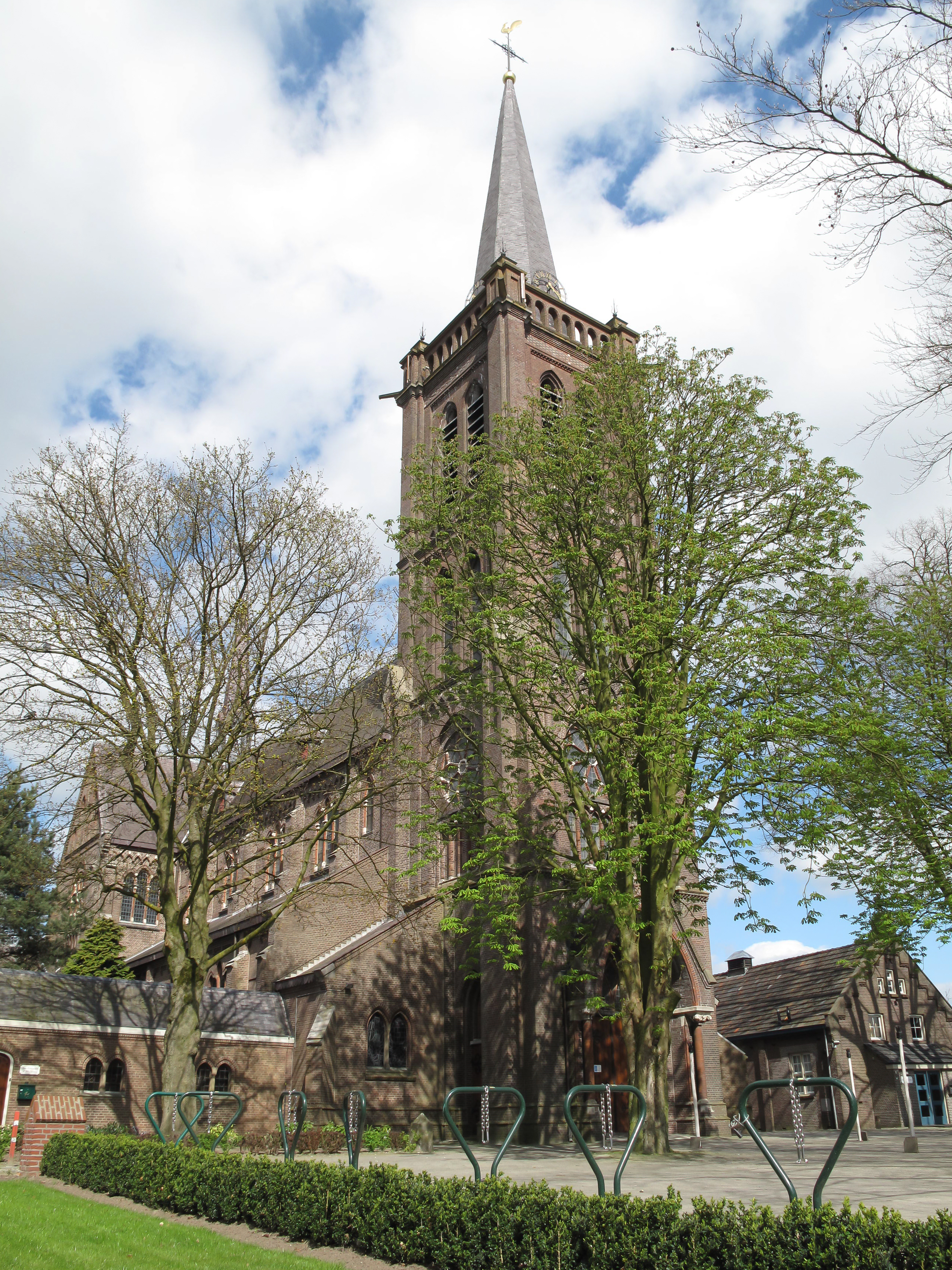
Heeswijk, church

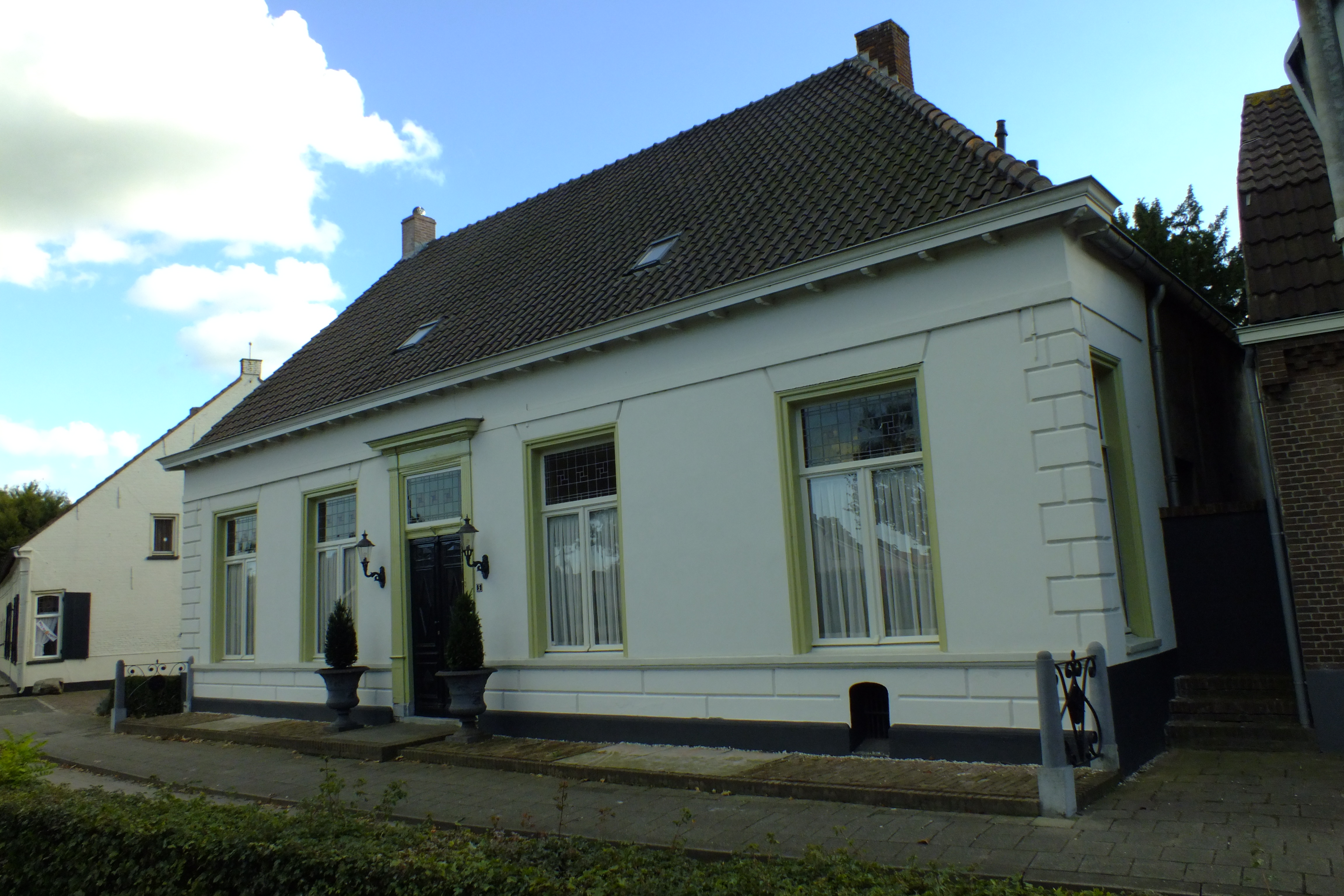
House in Heeswijk

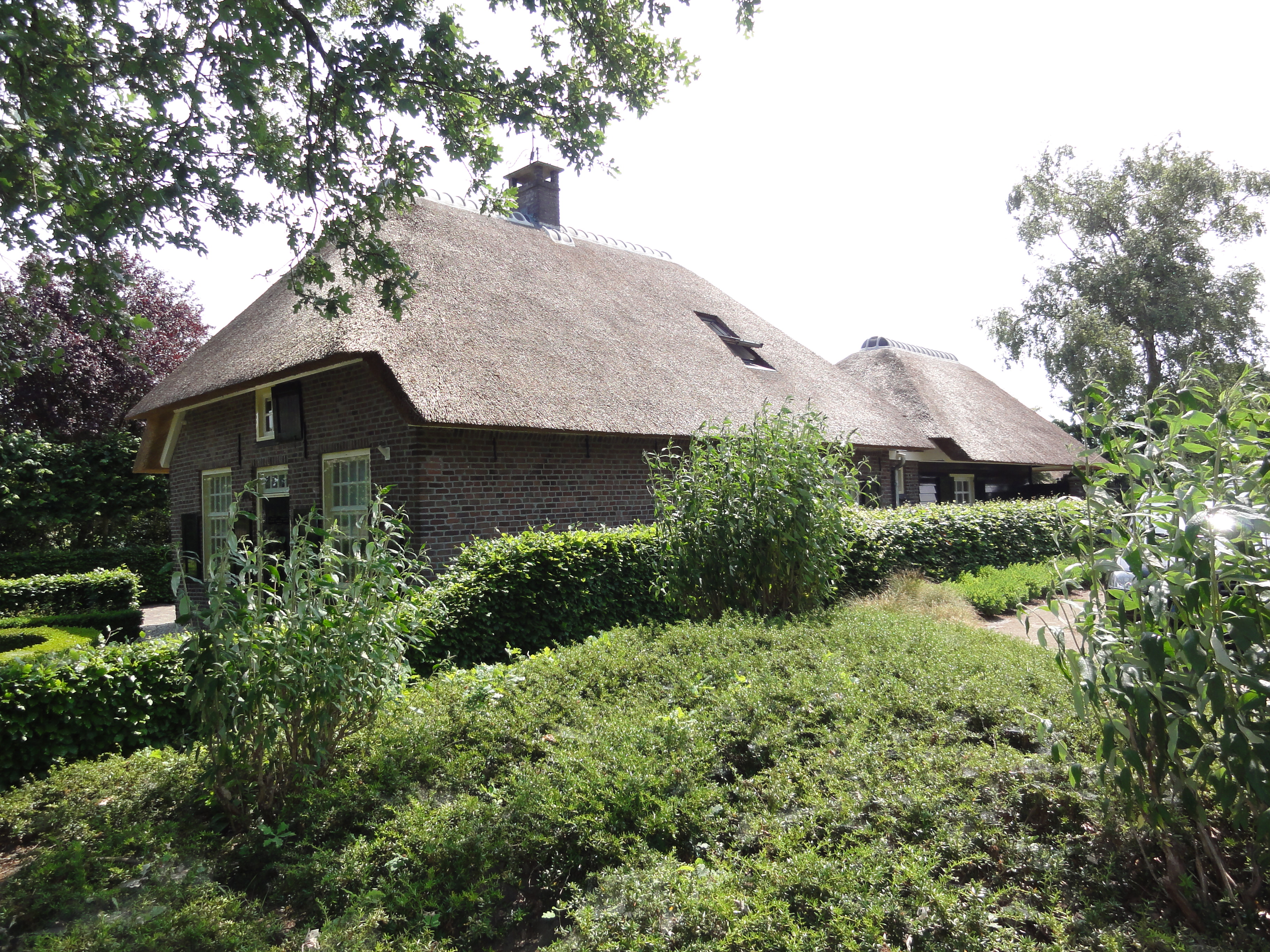
Farm in Heeswijk
