= Van Hees =

Van Hees is a Dutch toponymic surname meaning "from Hees". Hees may refer to a number of places, including Heeze (in the past also spelled "Hees") near Eindhoven, Hees (Nijmegen), a former village and now a neighborhood of Nijmegen, Hees (Soest), a former village near Utrecht, or Heesch/Heeswijk, a village near Oss. People with this name include:

- Adriaan van Hees (1910–1976), Dutch actor and member of the National Socialist Movement in the Netherlands (NSB)
- Christie Van Hees (born 1977), Canadian racquetball player
- Marco Van Hees (born 1964), Belgian writer and Marxist politician
- Martin van Hees (born 1964), Dutch philosopher and academic
- Sylvana van Hees (born 1993), Dutch wheelchair basketball player

Variants

- Dimitri van Heesch (born 1970s/1980s), Dutch developer of Doxygen software
- Kai van Hese (born 1989), Dutch footballer

== See also ==
- Van Hee
