= Bernheze =

- Municipality
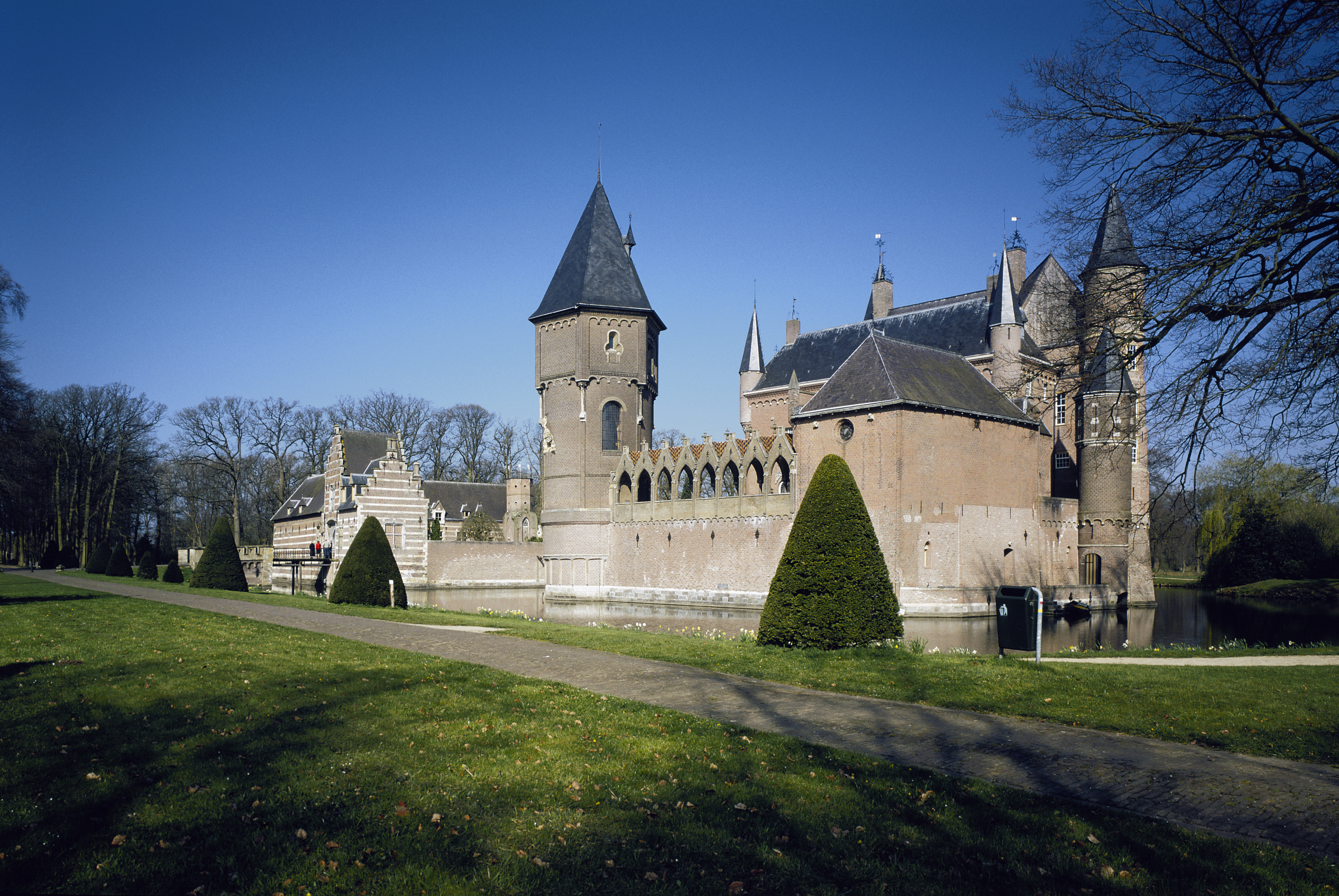
- Heeswijk Castle

- Flag Coat of arms

- Location in North Brabant
- Coordinates: 51°44′N 5°32′E
- Country: Netherlands
- Province: North Brabant
- Established: 1 January 1995

Government
  - Body: Municipal council
  - Mayor: Mark de Man (VVD)

Area
  - Total: 90.41 km^{2} (34.91 sq mi)
  - Land: 89.73 km^{2} (34.64 sq mi)
  - Water: 0.68 km^{2} (0.26 sq mi)
- Elevation: 9 m (30 ft)

Population (January 2021)
  - Total: 31,455
  - Density: 351/km^{2} (910/sq mi)
  - Uden-Veghel: 175,119
- Time zone: UTC+1 (CET)
  - Summer (DST): UTC+2 (CEST)
- Postcode: 5384, 5388, 5471–5476
- Area code: 0412, 0413
- Website: www.bernheze.org

Bernheze (Dutch pronunciation: [ˈbɛr(ə)nˌɦeːzə]) is a municipality in the southern Netherlands, in the province of North Brabant. It was formed as a rename of Heesch in 1995. The municipalities of Heeswijk-Dinther and Nistelrode had merged into Heesch in 1994.

== Etymology ==
The municipality was named after an old farm "Bernhese", which came into the possession of the Berne Abbey. This abbey was situated in the village of Bern. The meaning of 'Bernhese' is twofold: 'Bern' is the same as the old-Dutch word 'born', that means 'water' or 'well'. 'Hese' means bush or forest. In 1857 the Berne Abbey was founded in Heeswijk.

== Population centres ==
- Heesch
- Heeswijk
- Dinther
- Loosbroek
- Nistelrode
- Vorstenbosch

=== Topography ===
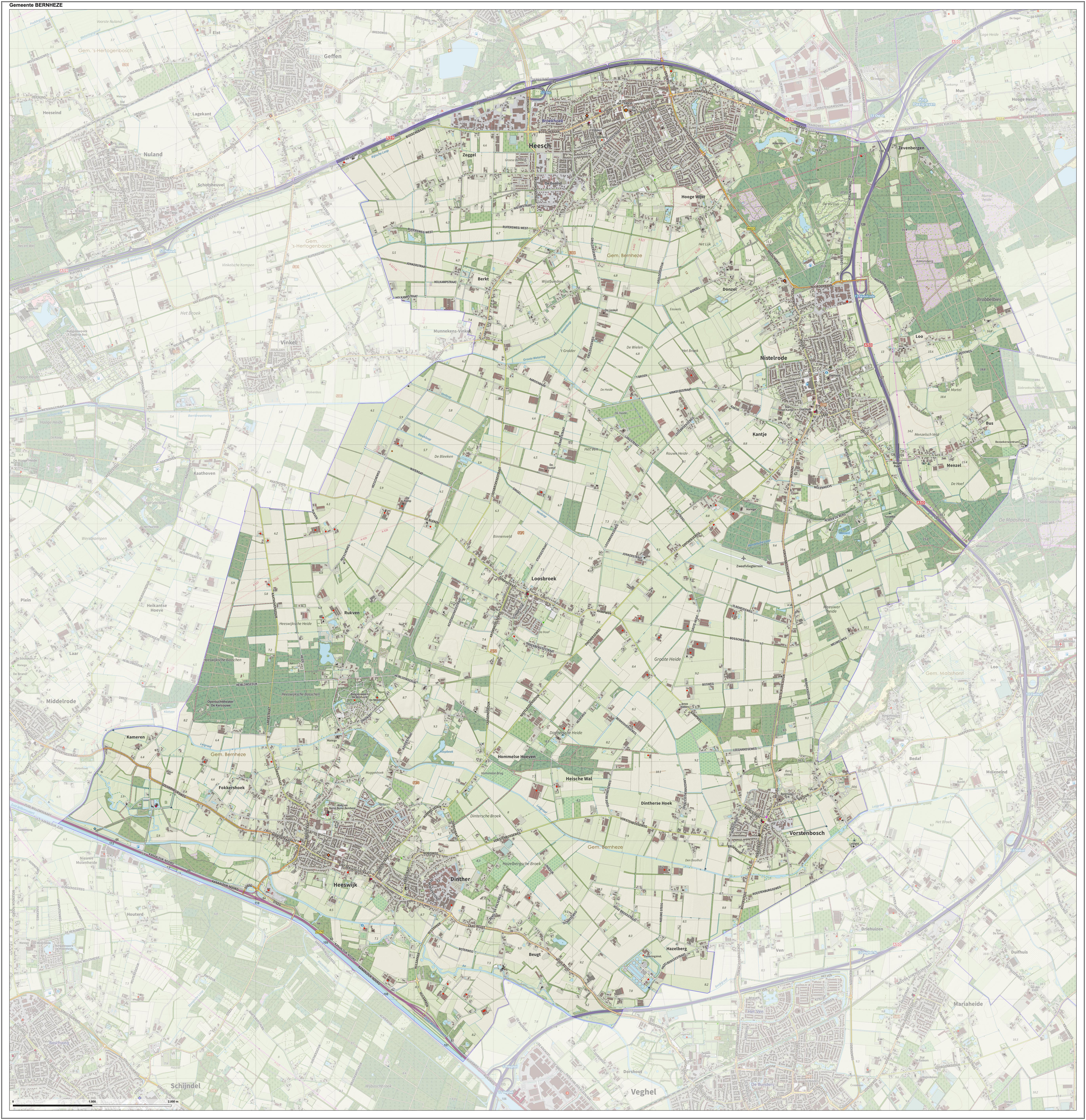

Dutch Topographic map of the municipality of Bernheze, June 2015.

== Notable people ==
- Marco Verkuylen (born 1967 in Heeswijk-Dinther) an electronic music DJ who works as Marco V
- Loek van Wely (born 1972 in Heesch) a chess player and politician

=== Sport ===
- Kirsten van de Ven (born 1985 in Heesch) a former professional footballer
- Raymon van der Biezen (born 1987 in Heesch) a BMX racer, competed in the 2008 and 2012 Summer Olympics
- Dave van der Burg (born 1993 in Heesch) a BMX rider, qualified for the 2020 Summer Olympics
- Vincent Janssen (born 1994 in Heesch) a professional footballer who plays in Mexico
- Sjef van den Berg (born 1995 in Heeswijk-Dinther) a competitive archer, competed at the 2016 Summer Olympics

== Gallery ==
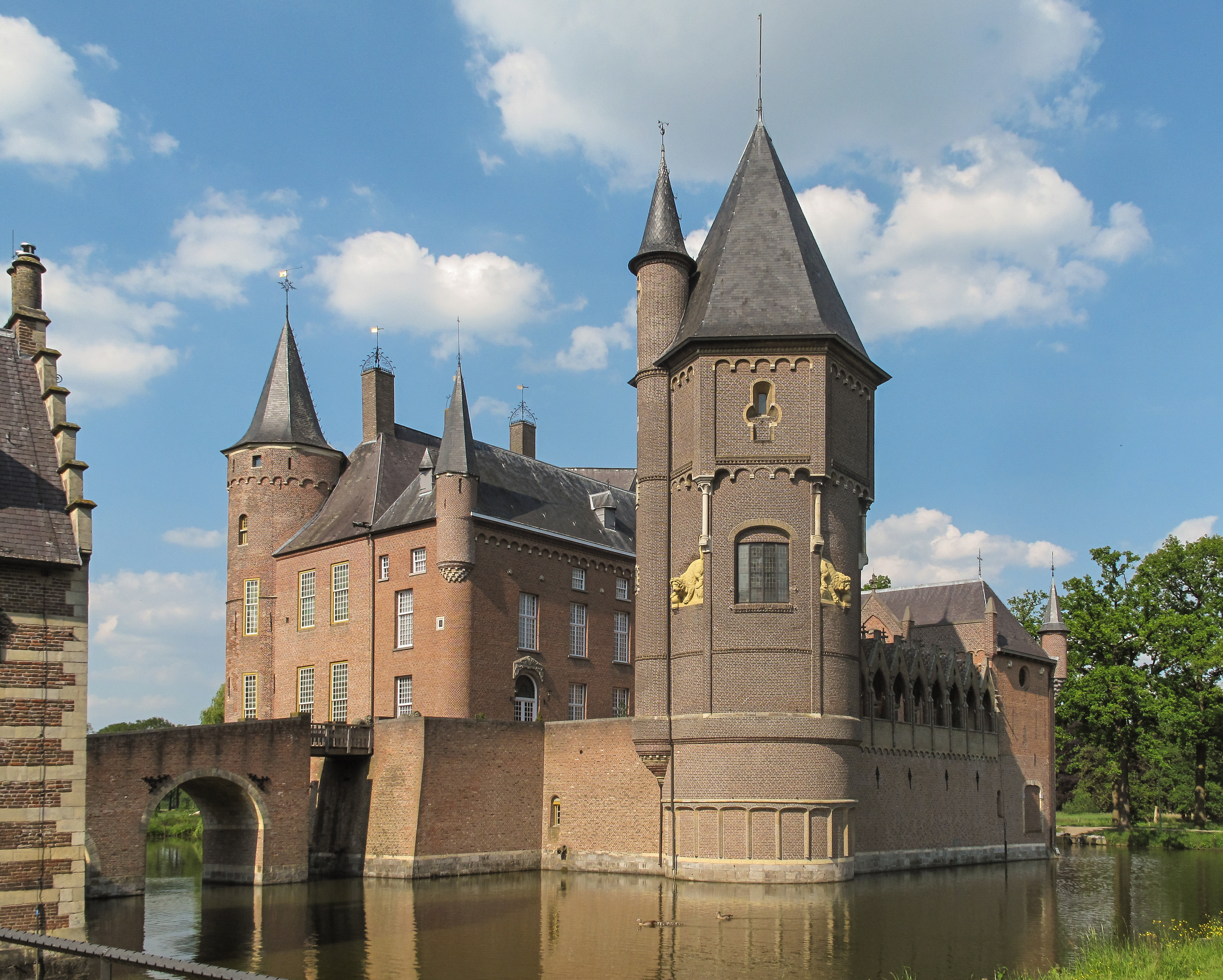
Heeswijk castle, main building

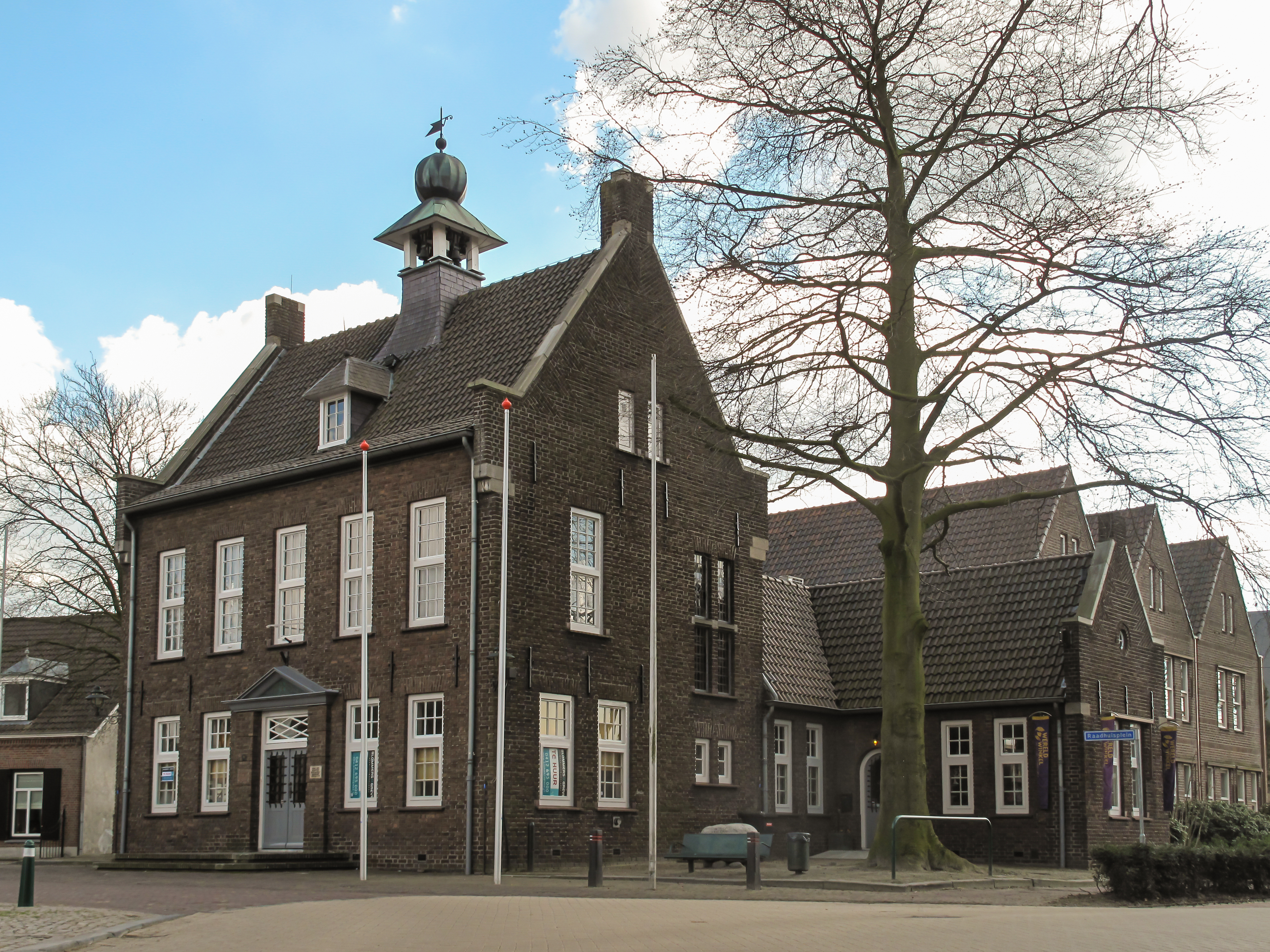
Nistelrode, monumental house

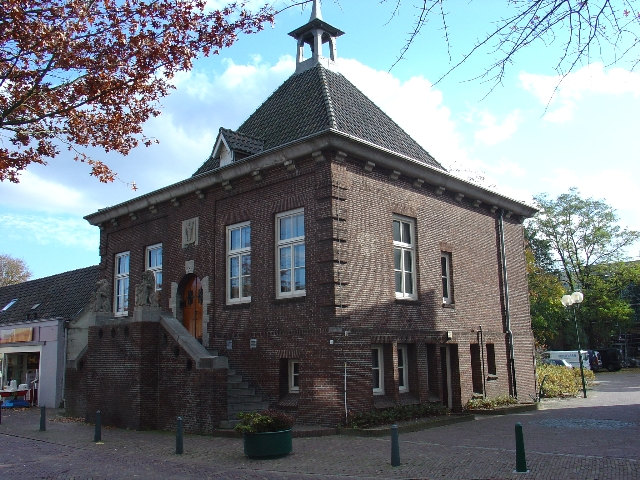
Raadhuis, Heesch

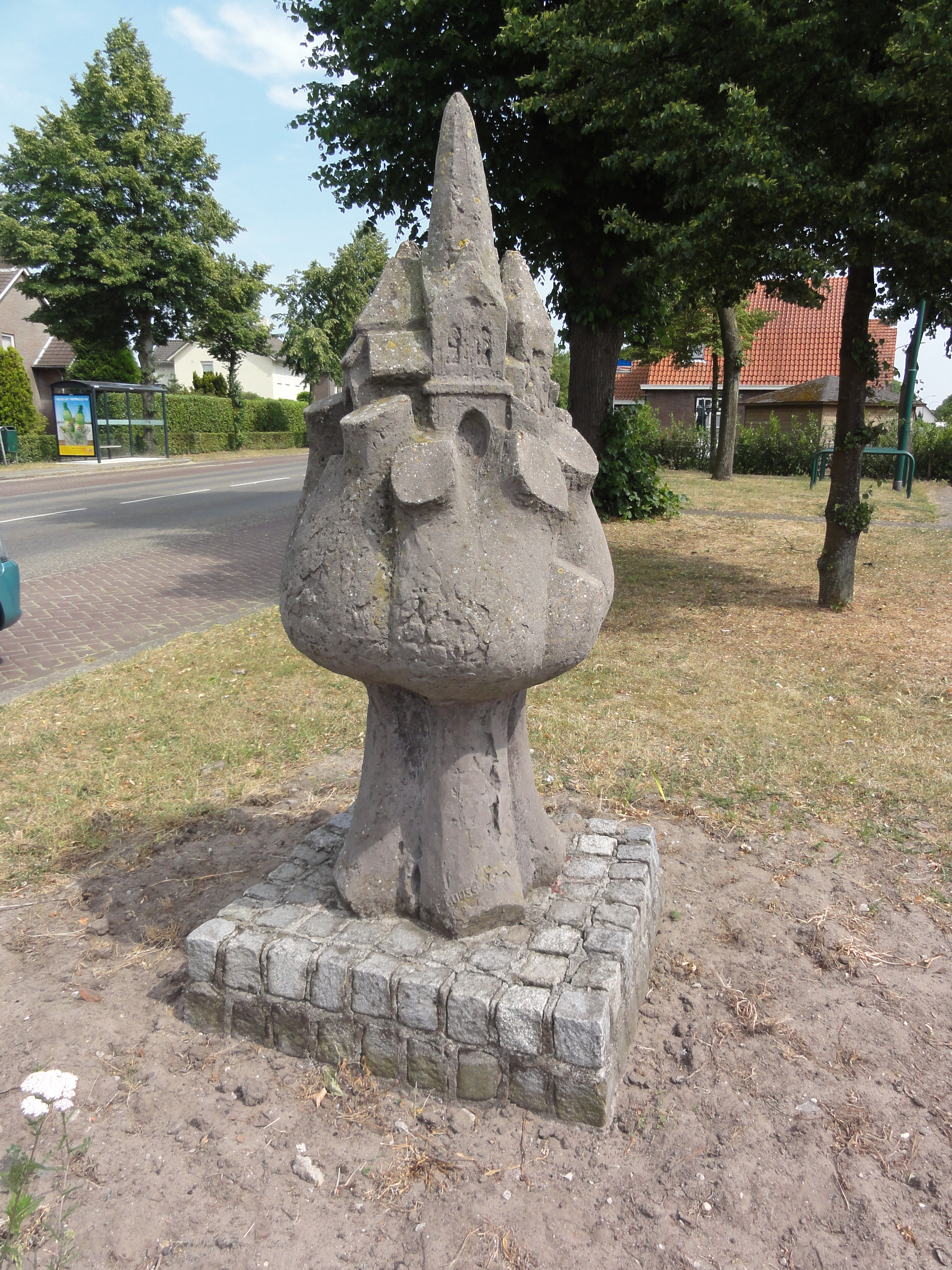
Dinther (Bernheze) sculptuur
