= Dinther =

- Village
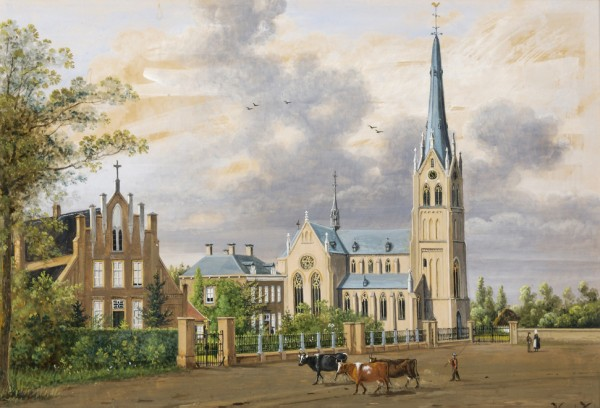
- Parish of Dinther in the 19th century

- Coat of arms

- Location in the province of North Brabant in the Netherlands Dinther (Netherlands)
- Coordinates: 51°38′42″N 5°29′11″E
- Country: Netherlands
- Province: North Brabant
- Municipality: Bernheze

Area
  - Total: 2.91 km^{2} (1.12 sq mi)
- Elevation: 8 m (26 ft)

Population (2021)
  - Total: 6,580
  - Density: 2,260/km^{2} (5,860/sq mi)
- Time zone: UTC+1 (CET)
  - Summer (DST): UTC+2 (CEST)
- Postal code: 5473
- Dialing code: 0413
- Major roads: A50, N279

Dinther is a village in the Dutch province of North Brabant. It is located in the municipality of Bernheze.

Dinther was a separate municipality and town until 1969, when it merged with Heeswijk to form the new municipality of Heeswijk-Dinther. Since the municipal merger, the two towns started to share a marketplace and center. Today the towns form the greater town of Heeswijk-Dinther.

== Etymology ==
The settlement now known as Dinther initially appears as Dinthre in a document from 1139. The name has an Old Frankish origin and is a composition of the words "Dint" and "haar". "Dint" (or "dent") means "dent" or "dented" usually it implies a landscape with rolling heights. "Haar" is an old Dutch word for a long-stretched sand dune. There lies a long stretched sand dune between the city of Berlicum and Veghel to the north of Dinther. It seems correct to translate Dinther as: "dented long stretched sand dune" (source: "Grepen uit de geschiedenis van Dinther 1139–1989", J. van der Leest). The current landscape though is green and does not show any signs of dunes or sand.

== History ==
In the early Middle Ages the first acres were cultivated out of fertile woodlands along the river "Aa". In the early Middle Ages Dinther was part of a free territory governed by the Lords of Dinther; as were the nearby towns of Heeswijk and Boxtel.

In 1196 half of this territory was granted in use by Knight Albert van Dinther to the Lord of Cuijk. The Lord of Cuijk granted the use to the Duke of Brabant. The Lords of Dinther probably resided in a stronghold on an artificial hill called "Ter Borch". This stronghold was most likely situated near the river Aa, to the south of Dinther.

In 1388 the other half of this territory was granted in use by "Willem van der Aa" to "Duchess Johanna van Brabant", which turned it into a part of the Duchy of Brabant. Dinther was part of the Meierij of 's-Hertogenbosch one of the four administrative parts of the Duchy of Brabant. In 1352 Dinther became an acknowledged town when "Jan van Benthem", Lord of Dinther, granted the inhabitants of the parish the use of the land. In the 14th century the residence of the Lords of Dinther moved from "Ter Borch" to the estate of "Ten Bogaerde". This was situated near the castle Avestein. Avestein was torn down in 1807.

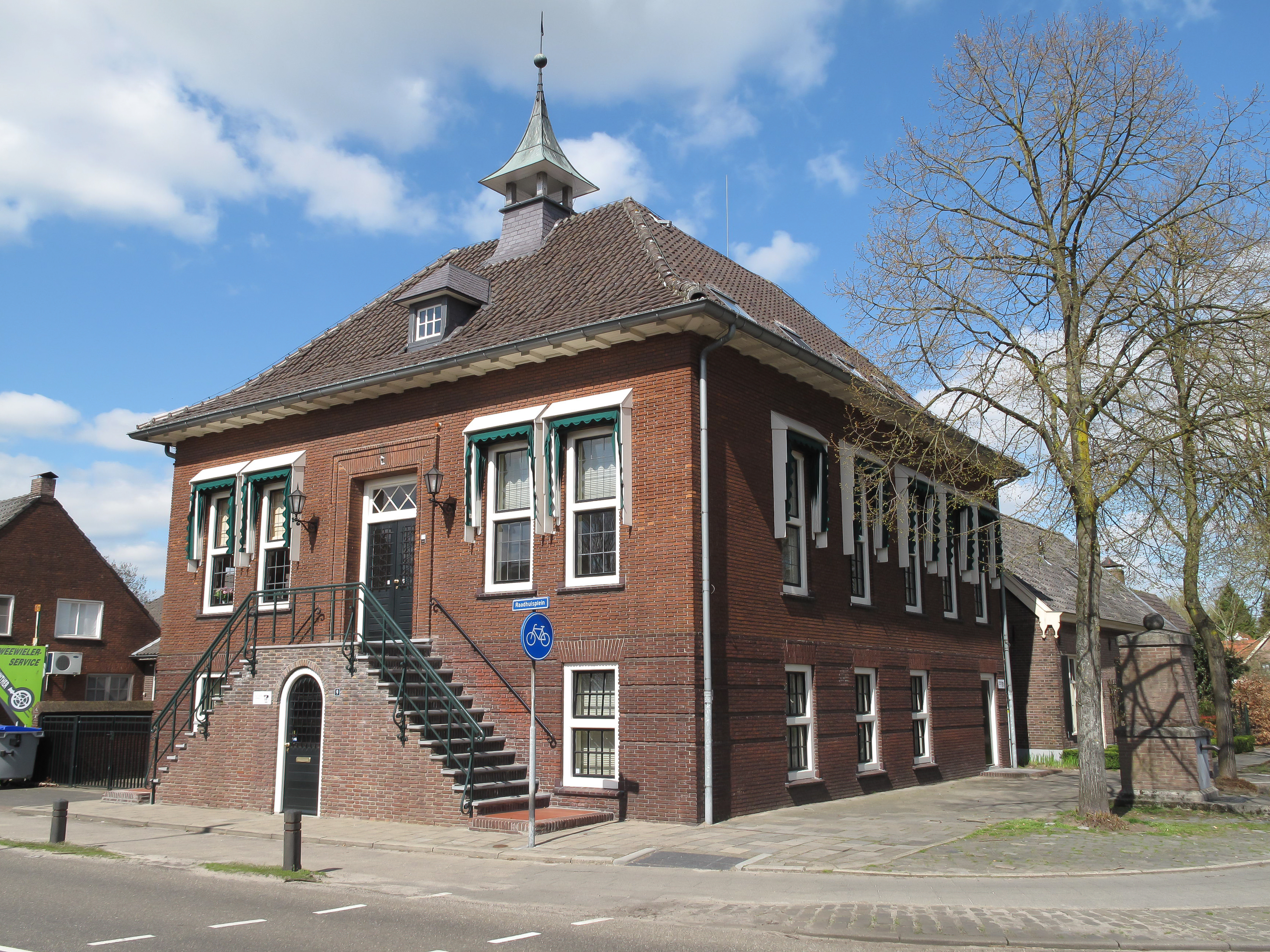
former Town hall Dinther

After the end of the Protestant Reformation in 1648 Dinther became part of the States of Brabant for the "Meierij van 's-Hertogenbosch" became part of the States of Brabant. The Protestants repressed the catholic faith in Dinther until 1795. Repressing is a strong term. In reality a manner of coexisting between Catholics and Protestants was daily practice. The administrative and political power though remained in the hands of the Protestants.

In 1795 the French invaded the Dutch Republic and "freedom of faith" is restored in Dinther. In 1814 Dinther becomes a part of the Kingdom of the Netherlands

== The village ==
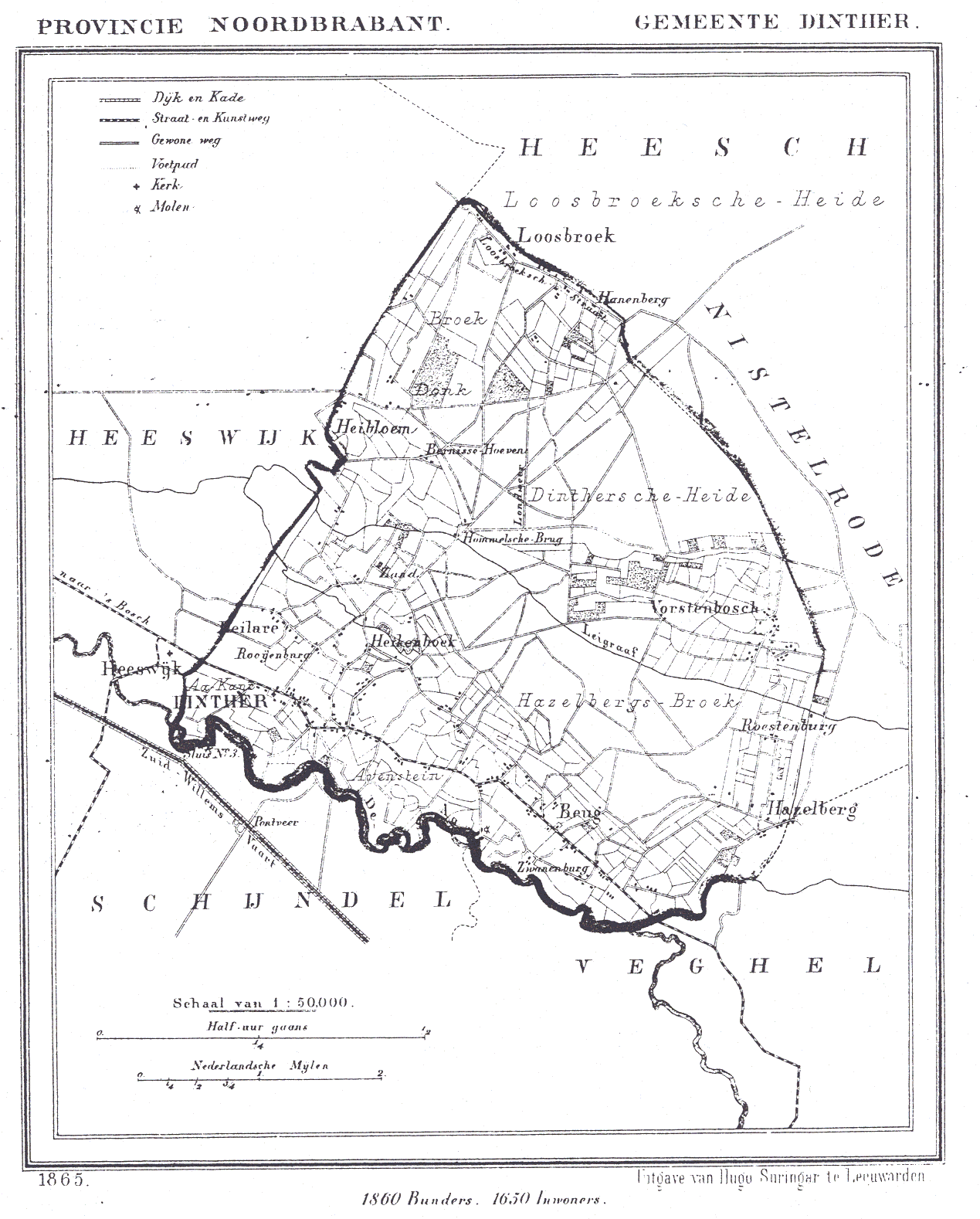
Dinther in 1865

Dinther has never been a significant town but was still a fairly large village. Dinther is situated next to a ford in the river Aa like Heeswijk and Veghel. The centre of Dinther is situated around the church. During the ages several houses or housing blocks have been added to the village. In essence the village is still a rural farm town. There is some industrial activity in an area called "Retsel".

== Sights in Dinther ==
- The Killdonk Mill . A rare water and wind mill combination. Restored in 2009.
- Manor Zwanenburg; a fortified house from the Middle Ages (14th century).
- The Saint Servatius church; a monument from 1877 restored in 2006.
- The Protestant Church from 1843.

== Landscape ==
The presence of the river Aa, subsidiaries as Leijgraaf and Oudebeek formed the landscape of Dinther; a typical river landscape. Since Dinther is situated in the Aa valley inundation was a fact of life for the early inhabitants. This caused a lot of damage to cattle and acres. The danger of inundation was removed when the river Aa was forced into a canal.

== Places nearby ==
Heeswijk, Loosbroek, Veghel
