= Heeswijk-Dinther =

Coordinates: 51°39′01″N 5°28′30″E

Heeswijk-Dinther (population: 7,985) is a town and former municipality in the southern Netherlands, in the province of North Brabant being named after the former municipalities Heeswijk and Dinther. The municipality was created in 1969, and became a part of Bernheze in 1994. Likewise, the town itself consisted of the former villages of Heeswijk and Dinther, which have grown together. After the merger into Bernheze, the town has been split up into Heeswijk and Dinther again. In 2008 the town was registered with the government as a single town. Only in 2017, the town is officially called Heeswijk-Dinther.

The municipality of Dinther included the town of Loosbroek.

== Formation ==
The municipalities of Heeswijk and Dinther had the same mayor from 1918 and in 1969 they were merged with part of Loosbroek to form the municipality of Heeswijk-Dinther. The villages of Heeswijk and Dinther were henceforth considered together as one residence. In 1993, Heeswijk-Dinther was again dissolved as a municipality and village and the villages of Heeswijk, Dinther and Loosbroek were incorporated into the municipality of Bernheze, along with the villages of Heesch, Nistelrode and Vorstenbosch. As a whole, the place is still referred to as Heeswijk-Dinther. Since 2017, this has been re-formalised.

== Sights ==
- Heeswijk Castle is a 12th-century water castle that was completely restored in 2005.
- The Abbey of Berne, located in Heeswijk since 1629, has been a center of culture and contemplation since before the Early Modern Era.
- Open air theatre the Kersouwe (founded in 1946) organizes more than thirty performances each year during the summer months.
- Castle Huize Zwanenburg, is a medieval fortified building from the 14th century that is currently occupied.
