= Hee (Korean name) =

- Hangul: 희
- RR: Hui
- MR: Hŭi
- IPA: [çi]

Hee, also spelled Hui, is a Korean given name. Notable people with the name include:

People with this name include:

- Sŏ Hŭi (942–998), Goryeo Dynasty diplomat
- Hwang Hui (1363–1452), official of the Goryeo and Joseon Dynasties
- Hee Oh (born 1969), South Korean mathematician
- Hyun Hee (born 1976), South Korean épée fencer
- Geum Hee (born 1979), South Korean writer born in Jilin, China
- Hee Seo (born 1986), South Korean ballerina with the American Ballet Theatre
- Ju Hui (born 1989), South Korean team handball player

== See also ==
- List of Korean given names
