= Heeswijk Castle =

Moated castle in the Dutch province of North Brabant

- Kasteel Heeswijk
- Heeswijk, the Netherlands
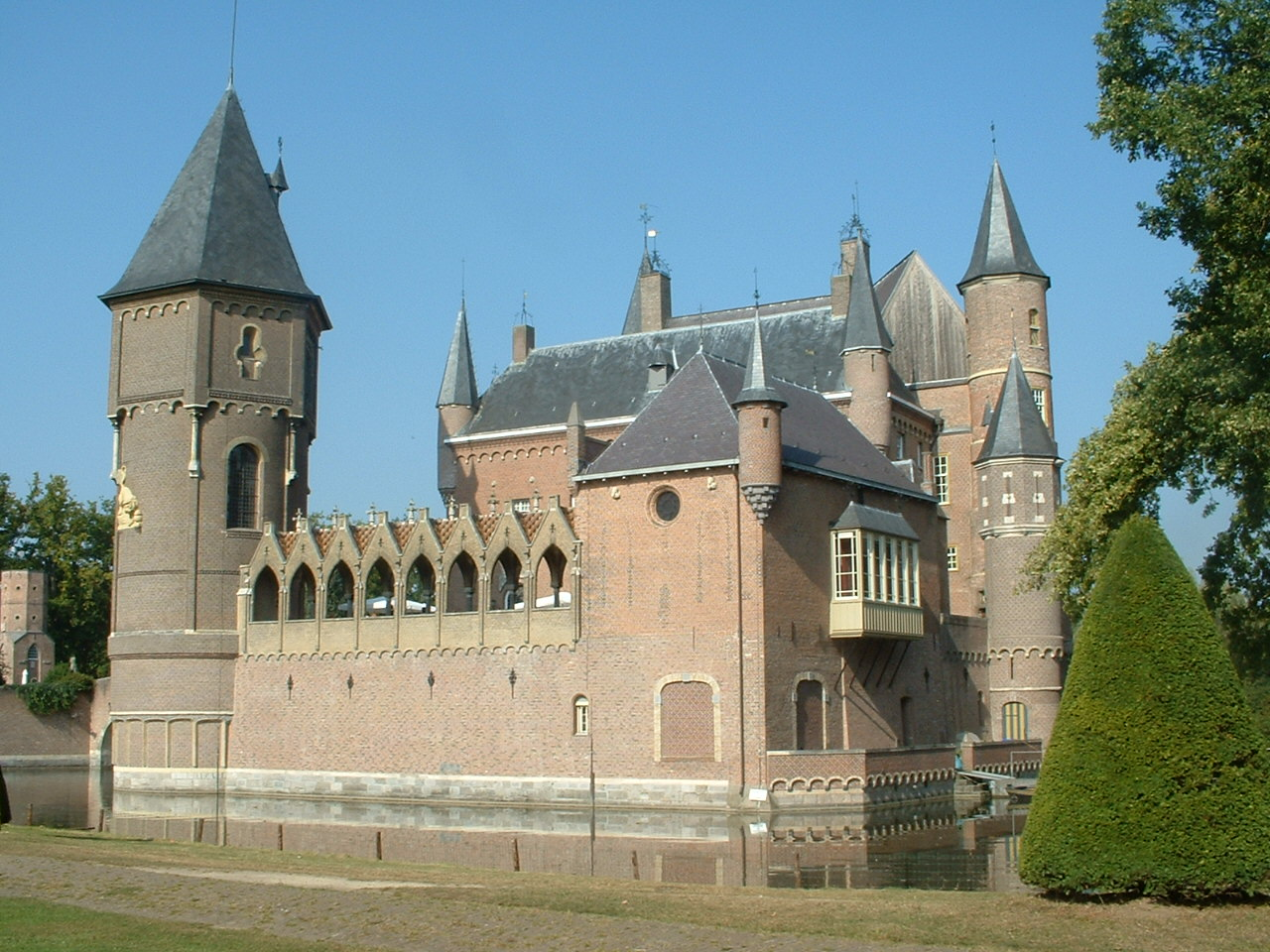
- Heeswijk Castle

Site information
- Type: Castle
- Open to the public: Yes (Museum)
- Condition: Reconstructed

Location
- the Netherlands
- Location within Netherlands
- Coordinates: 51°39′21″N 5°26′26″E

Site history
- Built: 1080
- Materials: Brick

Heeswijk Castle (Dutch: Kasteel Heeswijk) is a moated castle near Heeswijk in the Dutch province of North Brabant.

== Location ==
Heeswijk Castle was built on a meander of the small River Aa. The 20th century canalized Aa now flows at some distance of the Castle. However, in the early decades of the 21st century the original bed of the Aa closer to the castle, was restored and now gets enough water. The Aa was crucial for transporting heavy goods between 's-Hertogenbosch and Helmond, and perhaps even somewhat higher upstream. This gave an economic reason to build the castle on the river. On the other hand, the Aa was a barrier for east–west movement, especially by armies. This also gave the castle a strategic position, which it would keep for centuries.

== The Building ==
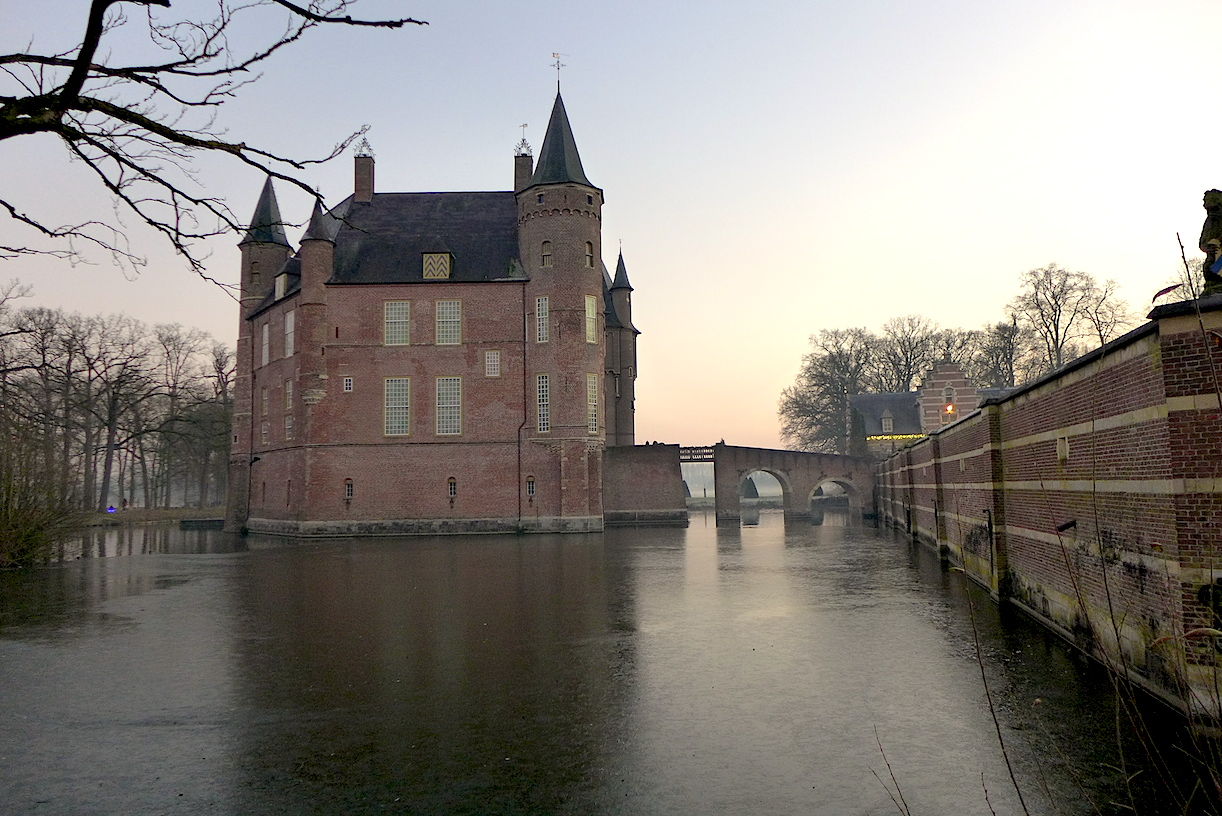
15-16th century north northeast side.

The main castle has been built on top of an old motte. In the cellar there is a loam layer containing fragments of bog iron and tuff, remnants of the first castle. There are also 14th century wall fragments visible in the cellars. Here the outer walls reach a thickness of three meters. Aboveground most of the main castle is 15th and 16th century, but the semi-circular form of the older parts still betrays its motte origin. The old part has two round towers on the corners, and one old overhanging tower. The bridge leading to the inner courtyard ends on the base of a disappeared square gate tower.

The big round tower, the gallery connected to it, and the armory to which the gallery connects are all nineteenth century additions. This is also the case for the round tower pasted to the eastern façade. Nevertheless, the big tower was built on top of older foundation. Therefore, these additions probably did not enlarge the ground plan of the castle that much, even though they may have made it more square.

The outer bailey is a fine example of sixteenth century construction. It was built of alternating rows of brick and stone, creating a striped façade. It also has nice features like stepped gables and cross-windows. The bailey is surrounded a wall in the same striped façade style.

== History ==
=== Medieval times ===
The original motte-and-bailey castle was erected in 1080. The first mentioned Lord of Heeswijk was Amelricus van Heeswijk mentioned in the twelfth century. Later that century a Hubertus van Heeswijk was mentioned.

In the thirteenth the Lords that gave their name to the castle were succeeded by Walraven of Bentheim from the family of the Counts of Bentheim. Walraven was still alive in 1308. That year Count Jan of Megen was in control of the lordship, and he remained so till his death in about 1346. After that Jan van Bentheim grandson of Walraven, became Lord of Heeswijk.

In a 1359 act Wenceslaus I, Duke of Luxembourg and his wife Joanna, Duchess of Brabant declared that Heeswijk and half of Dinther were within Brabant, but that Jan van Benthem had joined the war against County of Flanders voluntarily. That is, his goods were allod, i.e. not on loan from anybody. (The other half of Dinther was owned by Jan van Berlaer, Lord of Helmond). Such a voluntary involvement did create enemies, and in 1371 and 1372 Heeswijk Castle was attacked by Guelders and the Duchy of Jülich.

Jan van Benthem could maintain himself in Heeswijk, and so he 'sold' to Knight Dirk de Rover in 1374. Walraven of Bentheim son of Jan regained the estate in 1379, and so the transaction might not have been a final sale. Walraven sold the lordship to Willem van der Aa.

Willem van der Aa was schepen of 's-Hertogenbosch in 1388, 1392 and 1401. He was also a knight, and Lord of Nieuw-Herlaer Castle. He fought in the 1371 Battle of Baesweiler, and was captured and ransomed during that war. In 1387 he made the Lordship of Heeswijk and half of Dinther a loan of Brabant, and then also received the other half of Dinther. In 1398 Guelders troops burned down the villages of Heeswijk and Dinther, but could not conquer the castle. Willem van der Aa sold the Lordship of Heeswijk and Dinther in 1405. By 1409 he was dead.

Knight Hendrick van der Lek (1354–1427) would become the next lord. His father was the influential John II, Lord of Polanen (c. 1325–1378). As a younger son Hendrick did not succeed to the main part of his father's estate, which included the Lordship of Breda. In 1401 he was imprisoned by the citizens of 's-Hertogenbosch. It led to a conflict which ended with the Duchess paying a ransom for him. In 1405 Hendrick bought Heeswijk and Dinther. Hendrick became Hofmeister of John IV, Duke of Brabant. He also fought for his master, and was a member of the Illustrious Brotherhood of Our Blessed Lady in 's-Hertogenbosch. Hendrick first married Maria of Diest, which marriage remained childless. He next married Joanna of Ghistelles.

Hendrick van der Lek had two daughters by Joanna of Ghistelles. The oldest, Jeanne became Lady of Heeswijk and Dinther in 1427. She married Jan van Cuyck Lord of Hoogstraten. Jeanne did without offspring in 1454 and was buried in 's-Hertogenbosch. The younger daughter Elselina married Eustache de Bousies lord of Vertaing, Feluy, Gosselies, Rommeries etc. in 1446.

Their second son Pieter de Bousies lord of Vertaing would inherit all of his aunt Jeanne's estate. In 1471 he was appointed as high schout of 's-Hertogenbosch and the Meierij, but his investment was prevented by him not having been born in the Meierij. In 1473 he married for the second time, to Margaretha of Culemborg heiress of Jan van Culemborg Lord of Boxmeer and Spalbeek. Pieter led the militia of 's-Hertogenbosch in many wars against Guelders. In one of these he died near Heerewaarden on 22 April 1479.

Margaretha of Culemborg, widow of Pieter de Bousies remarried to Willem van Egmond Stadholder of Guelders. Their daughter Anna brought Boxmeer, Haps, Stevensweert and Spalbeek to the Counts of 's-Heerenberg by marrying Willem III van den Bergh. The property of Pieter de Bousies could did not move with his widow, but was inherited by his sisters: Margaretha, Anthonia, Johanna and Isabella. The first three sisters died as a member of a religious order. In 1485 the Count of Oettingen became lord of Heeswijk and Dinther on account of his wife being a daughter of Isabella.

=== 16th century ===
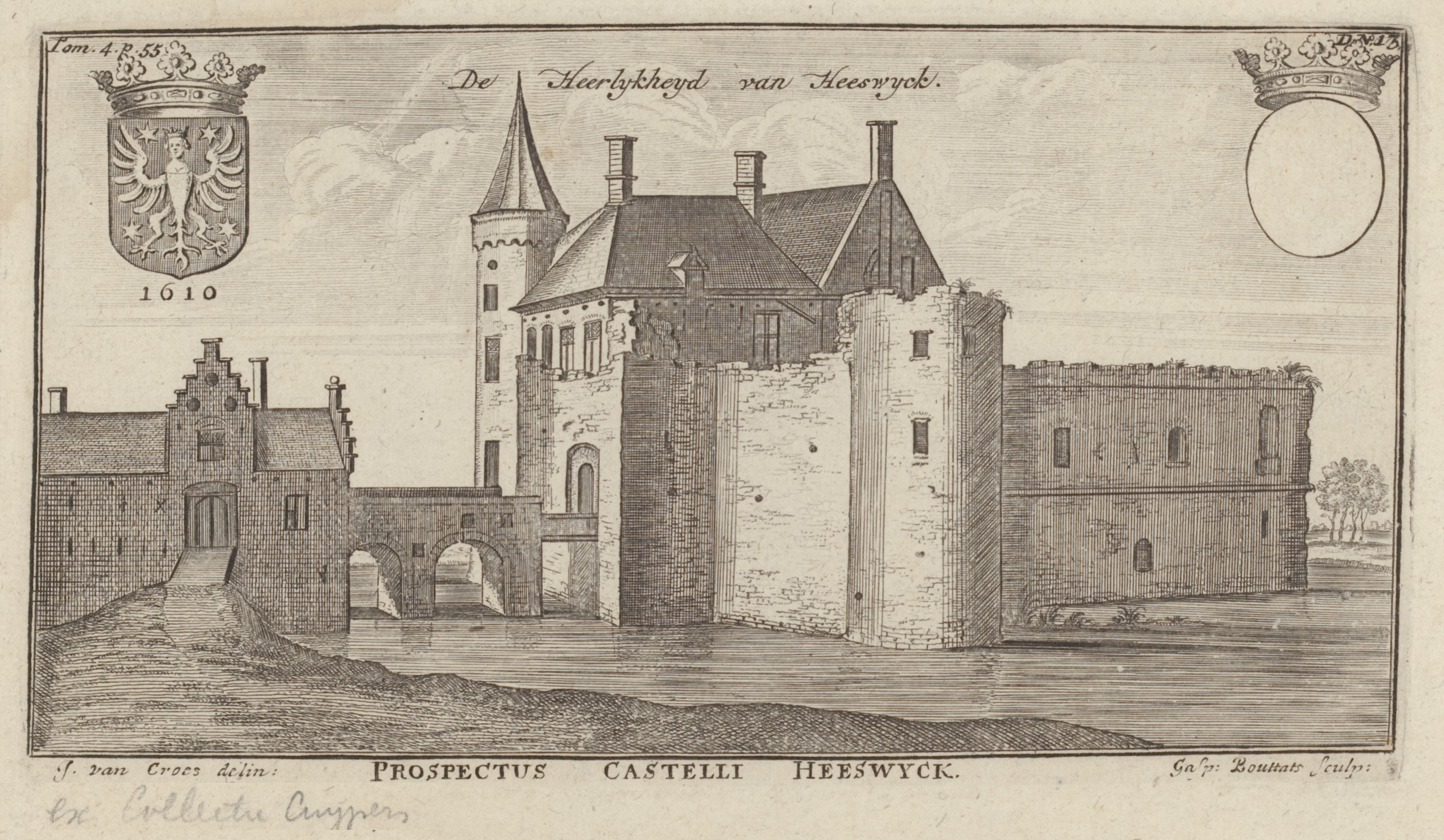
Heeswijk Castle, engraving dated 1650–1700

Cornelis of Glymes called 'De Berges' (1458-1508/1509) Lord of Zevenbergen became the next lord by purchase in 1499. Cornelis fought in the Battle of Tienen in 1482. He was the Hofmeister of Philip the Fair, and became a Knight of the Order of the Golden Fleece in 1500. In 1513 Cornelis became governor of Grave. He also became lord of Melun and Grevenbroeck. He married Maria Magdalena van Strijen lady of Zevenbergen, Noordeloos, Heemskerk and Capelle aan de IJssel. All of which were added to his estate.

After the death of Cornelis de Glymes most of his estate went to his sons, and finally his younger sister Maria de Glymes married to Louis de Ligne Baron of Barbançon. The Lordship of Heeswijk and Dinther first went to Cornelis' oldest son Maximilian. He was invested in December 1509. During his rule the Guelders army invaded and burned the area in 1512–1513, but did not succeed in capturing Heeswijk Castle.

Maximilian was succeeded by his brother Leonard de Glymes, who became lord in 1521. He died in 1523 and was succeeded by his younger brother Corneille of Berghes (1490?-1560?), prince bishop of Liège in 1538. Corneille sold Heeswijk and Dinther in 1555 to Johan I of East Frisia, a non-ruling count of that house. For 60,000 guilders the count also got: a watermill in Middelrooy and a windmill in Schijndel with the farm of Veerdonc and others.

Johan married Dorothea of Austria (1516–1572) a bastard of Maximilian I, Holy Roman Emperor, heiress of Falkenburg, Durbuy and Halem, lady in waiting to Queen Maria of Hungary.

=== The Eighty Years' War ===
The Eighty Years' War reached the environs on 's-Hertogenbosch in 1572-1573 when first Gorinchem and Zaltbommel, and then Geertruidenberg joined the Dutch Republic. In 1578 Heeswijk Castle got a Republican garrison of 20 men under Jaques de Wale. The mighty fortress 's-Hertogenbosch finally joined the Spanish side in 1579. For the defense of the countryside it then had to rely on a string of castles and sconces and a few small cities. Heeswijk Castle had switched sides by the end of 1579, and was one of these.

Maximilian of Ostfriesland (1553-1591?), son of Johan and Dorothea became lord of Heeswijk and Dinther in 1574. Maximilian was governor and captain-general of Luxembourg. He married Barabara de Lalaing, sister of the stadholder of Groningen. Maximilian at first succeeded in taking responsibility for Heeswijk's defense. He had a son Werner and a daughter named Dorothea. Werner succeeded his father. He was married to Johanna of Merode Houfalize. in 1599 the governor of 's-Hertogenbosch took command of the castle.

On 1 November 1601 the army of Maurice of Nassau appeared before Heeswijk Castle. As usual the garrison was summoned to surrender. The subsequent refusal to surrender was kind of exceptional for a castle. An assault followed, but was repealed. A few days later the castle was found to be deserted. This was not so strange, because the garrison could not expect quarter after this. In the end 's-Hertogenbosch and Heeswijk stayed on the Spanish sided till the 1609 truce.

Near the end of the Twelve Years' Truce (1609-1621) new rulers were appointed at Heeswijk. Werner of Ostfriesland died in 1620, and left only a bastard Maria. His sister Dorothea married lieutenant general James 't Serclaes (?-1624) older brother of Johann Tserclaes, Count of Tilly and got Jan Werner. Jan Werner 't Serclaes Count of Tilly, Bannerman of Marbaix, Lord of Montigny (?-1668) became the next Lord of Heeswijk and Dinther in 1621. Maria of Ostfriesland, the bastard of Werner also acceded in 1621.

In 1629 Frederick Henry, Prince of Orange captured Heeswijk Castle and 's-Hertogenbosch. Maria of Ostfriesland married Hendrik van den Berg, and died in 1633. Jan Werner 't Serclaes then also succeeded to her part in 1633. He became the prime heir to his famous uncle. On 14 March 1633 Jan Werner married Maria Françoise de Montmorency, but the next generation of the Tilly's would not get Heeswijk, in 1647 it was sold.

=== 17th and 18th century ===
On 20 April 1647 Dirk van Cattenburgh, presiding schepen of 's-Hertogenbosch and Joost van Hedickhuysen, Lord of Eckart bought the Lordship of Heeswijk and Dinther. Dirk had been schepen of 's-Hertogenbosch 1640-1643 and in 1646 he became presiding schepen. He died in 1653. Joost van Hedickhuysen was of unknown origin. He lived at close by Seldensate Manor, but died already in October 1647.

Jonkheer Matthijs van Asperen, captain in the Dutch army then bought Heeswijk and Dinther in 1649 and became the official lord in May 1650. Matthijs later became a colonel and commander of 's-Hertogenbosch. In 1655 he gave a guarantee on Heeswijk to his creditor Geraert Maes, a jeweller from The Hague. In 1672 the French king Louis XIV stayed at Heeswijk Castle during his campaign against the Dutch Republic. Geraert Maes' widow Elisabeth Lasson became the next proprietor in 1679. In 1684 Jacobus van der Hoeven succeeded to Heeswijk. He married Agatha Briel, related to the Van Beresteyn's (cf. Maurick Castle) and died in 1691. His widow succeeded. In 1699 their son Jacob van der Hoeven became Lord of Heeswijk. He was in turn succeeded by his son Jacob, who became lord in 1719 and who died in 1739.

Mr. Cornelis Speelman became the next lord in 1740, because he had married Jacob's sister Agatha van der Hoeven in 1716. Cornelis was a grandson of Cornelis Speelman (1628-1684), Governor-General of the Dutch East Indies. Cornelis became schepen in 's-Hertogenbosch, and died in 1746. He was succeeded by mr. Jacob Speelman (1722-1787), who made an impressive career in Leiden. In 1788 he was succeeded by his son mr. Cornelis Jacob Speelman (1747-1825). During his tenure the French general Pichegru used the castle as his headquarters. The French period also meant the abolition of the feudal rights. Cornelis Jacob was succeeded by his son Abraham Florentius (1784-1840), but in 1834 the family sold their property in Heeswijk and Dinther.

=== Collector Baron van den Bogaerde van Terbrugge ===
In 1834, Baron Andreas van den Bogaerde van Terbrugge, governor of North Brabant, bought Heeswijk Castle, which by then had fallen into disrepair. He immediately started reconstruction works on a large scale. The castle was also enlarged with an armory. He also added the so-called 'Iron Tower'. Here the growing collection of art objects and curiosities collected by the baron and his sons, Louis and Donat was stored. In 1836 Van den Bogaerde van Terbrugge and six others founded the Provinciaal Genootschap van Kunsten en Wetenschappen, a society that would grow to become the Noordbrabants Museum.

== The Museum ==
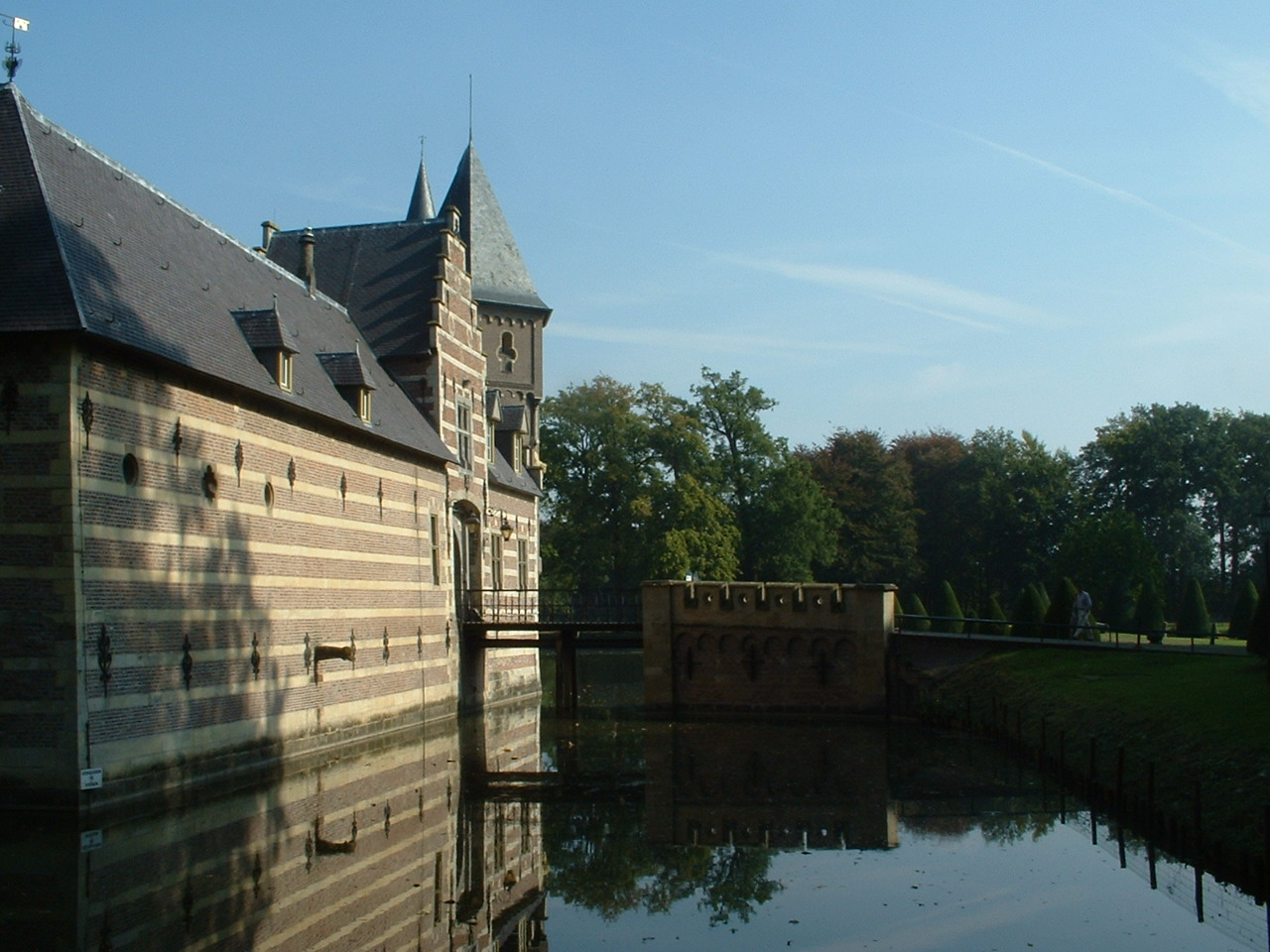
Outer Bailey of Heeswijk Castle

The castle was restored in 2005. The current castle museum attempts to reflect the life and traditions of the middle of the 19th century. Following the recent restorations, guided tours of the castle are offered.

The armory of the castle is used as a wedding location by the municipality Bernheze. Under the promenade cellar roofs (wedding) receptions can be held and the carriage house of the castle accommodates training facilities as well as congress and presentation rooms.

== See also ==
- List of castles in the Netherlands
