= Vorstenbosch =

- Village
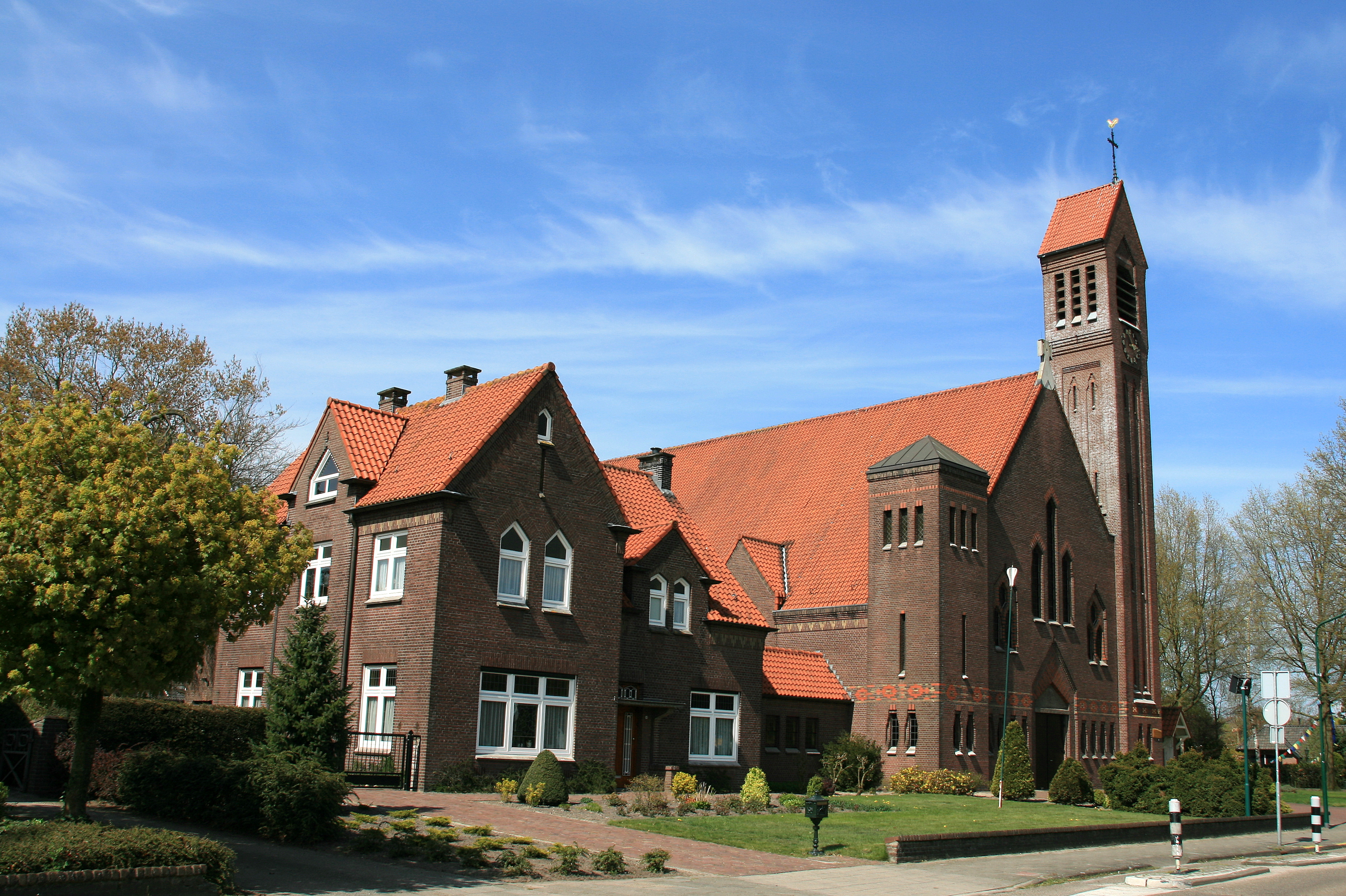
- Church and clergy house of Vorstenbosch

- Location in the province of North Brabant in the Netherlands Vorstenbosch (Netherlands)
- Coordinates: 51°39′N 5°33′E
- Country: Netherlands
- Province: North Brabant
- Municipality: Bernheze

Area
  - Total: 4.73 km^{2} (1.83 sq mi)
- Elevation: 0.9 m (3.0 ft)

Population (2021)
  - Total: 715
  - Density: 151/km^{2} (392/sq mi)
- Time zone: UTC+1 (CET)
  - Summer (DST): UTC+2 (CEST)
- Postal code: 5476
- Dialing code: 0413
- Major roads: A50

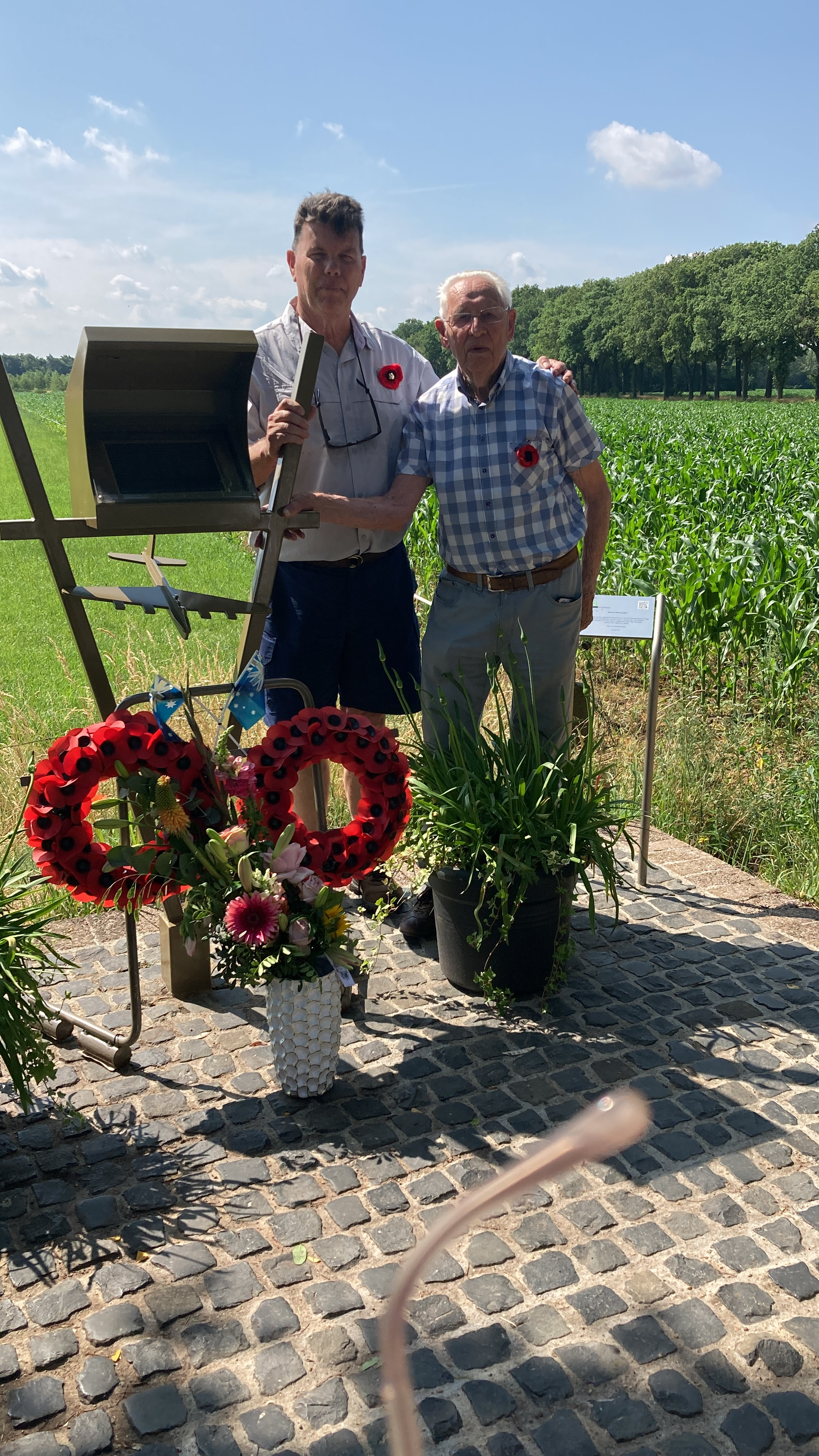
Peter McHugh from Australia (nephew of RAAF Pilot Officer Maurice McHugh) and Jan Smolenaers from Vorstenbosch (who witnessed the crash in 1944) visit the Stirling Memorial in June 2023

Vorstenbosch is a village of the municipality Bernheze. Bernheze is located in the province of North Brabant, one of the 12 provinces of the Netherlands.

== History ==
The village was first mentioned in 1485 as Vorsschenbosch. The etymology of the first word is unclear. It can either mean "front (nearest) forest" or "forest with frogs".

Vorstenbosch was home to 355 people in 1840. The St Lambartus Church dates from 1932. Before 1994 it formed with Nistelrode, the municipality of Nistelrode.

=== Stirling memorial. ===
On Wednesday 20 September 1944, during Operation Market Garden, a Short Stirling Bomber (LK-548) from 620 Squadron crashed on the outskirts of the village.

The aircraft had taken off from RAF Fairford at 14.45 pm to resupply British paratroopers on the ground at Oosterbeek.

After successfully dropping their supplies the aircraft was hit by flak and 88 mm anti aircraft shells and caught fire but continued to fly for another 50 km before crashing into a Dutch farm at Vorstenbosch. As the aircraft began losing height, RAAF Pilot Officer Maurice McHugh ordered the crew to bail out. It was later reported that he refused a chute which was offered to him and stayed at the controls to attempt a forced landing. Three airmen, Navigator - Flight Sergeant, John (Jock) Hume, Flight Engineer – Sergeant, David Evans, Bomb Aimer - Flight Sergeant, Nicholas Gasgoyne managed to parachute out. They sustained injuries but evaded capture and were helped back to England with the aid of the Dutch resistance.

Maurice McHugh, along with the remainder of his crew were killed when the aircraft crashed. They included Wireless Operator - Flight Sergeant, Eric Arthur Bradshaw, Rear Gunner- Sergeant, Thomas Vickers, Dispatcher - Lance Corporal, John Waring and Dispatcher – Driver, Ernest Victor Heckford.

By the evening, the Battle for the Arnhem Bridge was all but lost.

Nearly half the British, American and Polish troops that landed at Arnhem were either killed, wounded or captured. Maurice McHugh was one of 13 Australian airmen lost. He was only 21 years old and is buried along with the other members of his crew in a collective grave at Groesbeek. The body of Ernest Heckford was never found but he is commemorated at the entrance to the cemetery.

The bent propeller and other pieces of the wreckage are on display in the Typhoon Museum at the nearby Airbase Volkel. They were recovered in 1977 when the farmland at the crash site was being levelled.

In 2015, the community of Vorstenbosch built a small memorial at the site of the crash at Meuwelweg.

== Sights ==
Interesting things to see:

- Parish church St. Lambertus
- Corn mill "Windlust", completely restored in 2008
- Old lime tree
- Blow dunes in the vicinity (Bedaf)
- Memorial to the Short Stirling crash - 20 Sept 1944

== Gallery ==
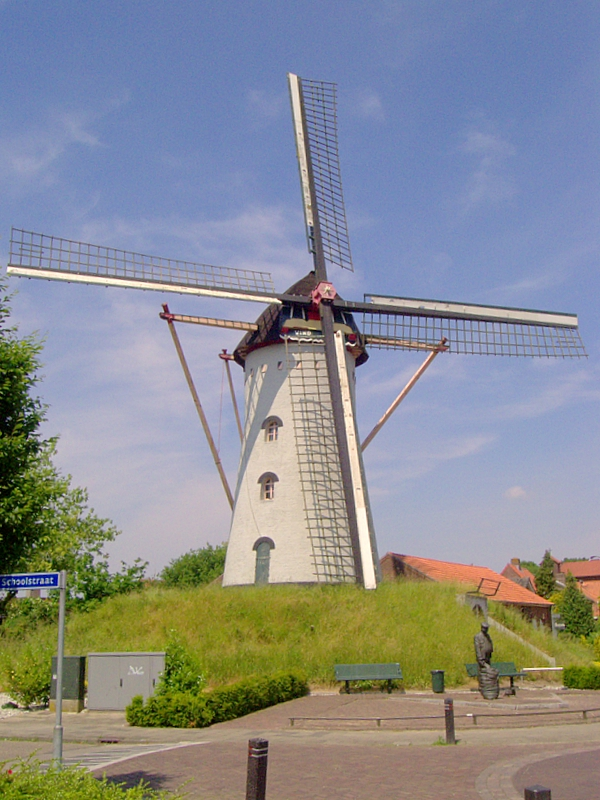
Wind mill Windlust

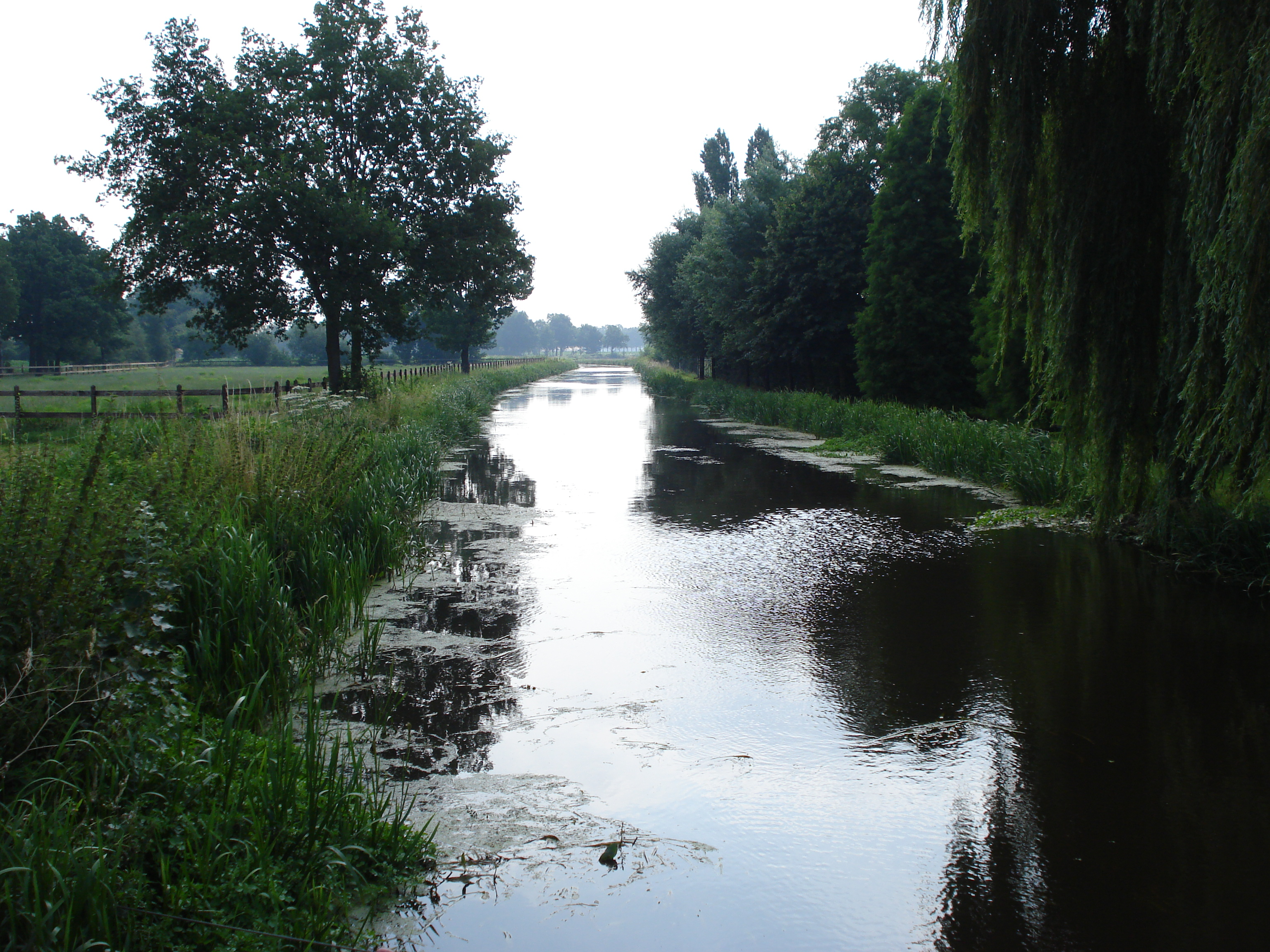
Landscape near Vorstenbosch
