= Van Hee =

Van Hee is a surname. Notable people with the surname include:

- Kees van Hee (born 1946), Dutch computer scientist
- Kim Van Hee (born 1978), Belgian singer

== See also ==
- Van Hees
