= Heesch, Netherlands =

Heesch
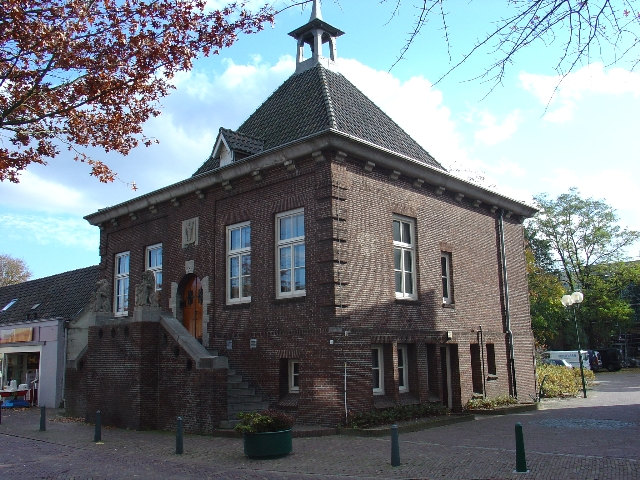
- The former town hall of Heesch

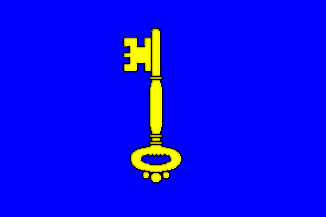
- Flag Coat of arms

- Location of Heesch in the province of North Brabant Heesch (Netherlands)
- Coordinates: 51°44′N 5°32′E
- Country: Netherlands
- Province: North Brabant
- Municipality: Bernheze
- First mentioned: 1191

Population (1 January 2007)
  - Total: 12,547
- Postcode: 5384
- Area code: 0412
- Website: www.heesch.nl

Heesch (Dutch pronunciation: [ɦeːs]) is a village in the Dutch province of North Brabant. Heesch is next to the village Vinkel. It is located in the municipality of Bernheze, about 3 km south of Oss.

Heesch was a separate municipality until 1994, when it merged with Heeswijk-Dinther and Nistelrode. The new municipality was originally called "Heesch", but changed its name to "Bernheze" in 1995.
