= Nistelrode =

- Village
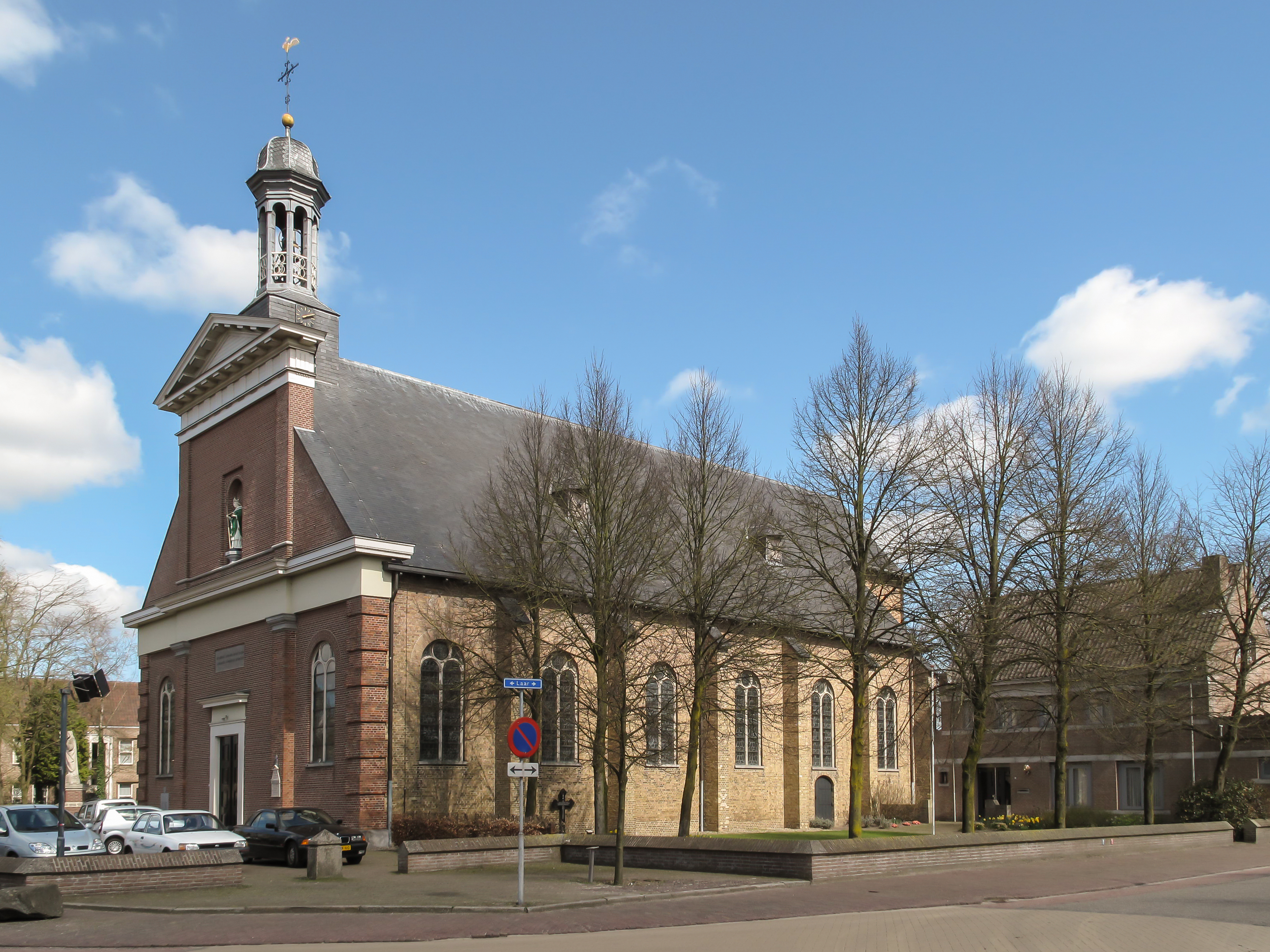
- Church of Nistelrode

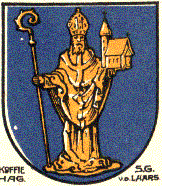
- Flag Coat of arms

- Location in the province of North Brabant in the Netherlands Nistelrode (Netherlands)
- Coordinates: 51°42′N 5°33′E
- Country: Netherlands
- Province: North Brabant
- Municipality: Bernheze

Area
  - Total: 3.05 km^{2} (1.18 sq mi)
- Elevation: 11 m (36 ft)

Population (2021)
  - Total: 5,455
  - Density: 1,790/km^{2} (4,630/sq mi)
- Time zone: UTC+1 (CET)
  - Summer (DST): UTC+2 (CEST)
- Postal code: 5388
- Dialing code: 0412
- Major roads: A50

Nistelrode is a village in the Dutch province of North Brabant. It is located in the municipality of Bernheze, about 8 km south of Oss.

== History ==
The village was first mentioned in the 13th century as Nisterle. The etymology is unclear, because of the earlier forms. Nistelrode is stretched out village on sandy ground. It became an independent parish in 1291. It has a triangular brink (village square) around which the church, town hall and houses were built.

The Catholic St Lambertus Church was built between 1841 and 1842 in neoclassic style as a replacement of a chapel from 1340. It was enlarged in 1882 and 1929.

The grist mill Windlust was built in 1532. It was moved to its current location in 1898. In the 1950s, the owner went out of business and the wind mill started to decay. In 1974, it was restored and is regularly in service.

Nistelrode was home to 170 people in 1840. Nistelrode was a separate municipality until 1994, when it became part of the municipality of Heesch.

== Gallery ==
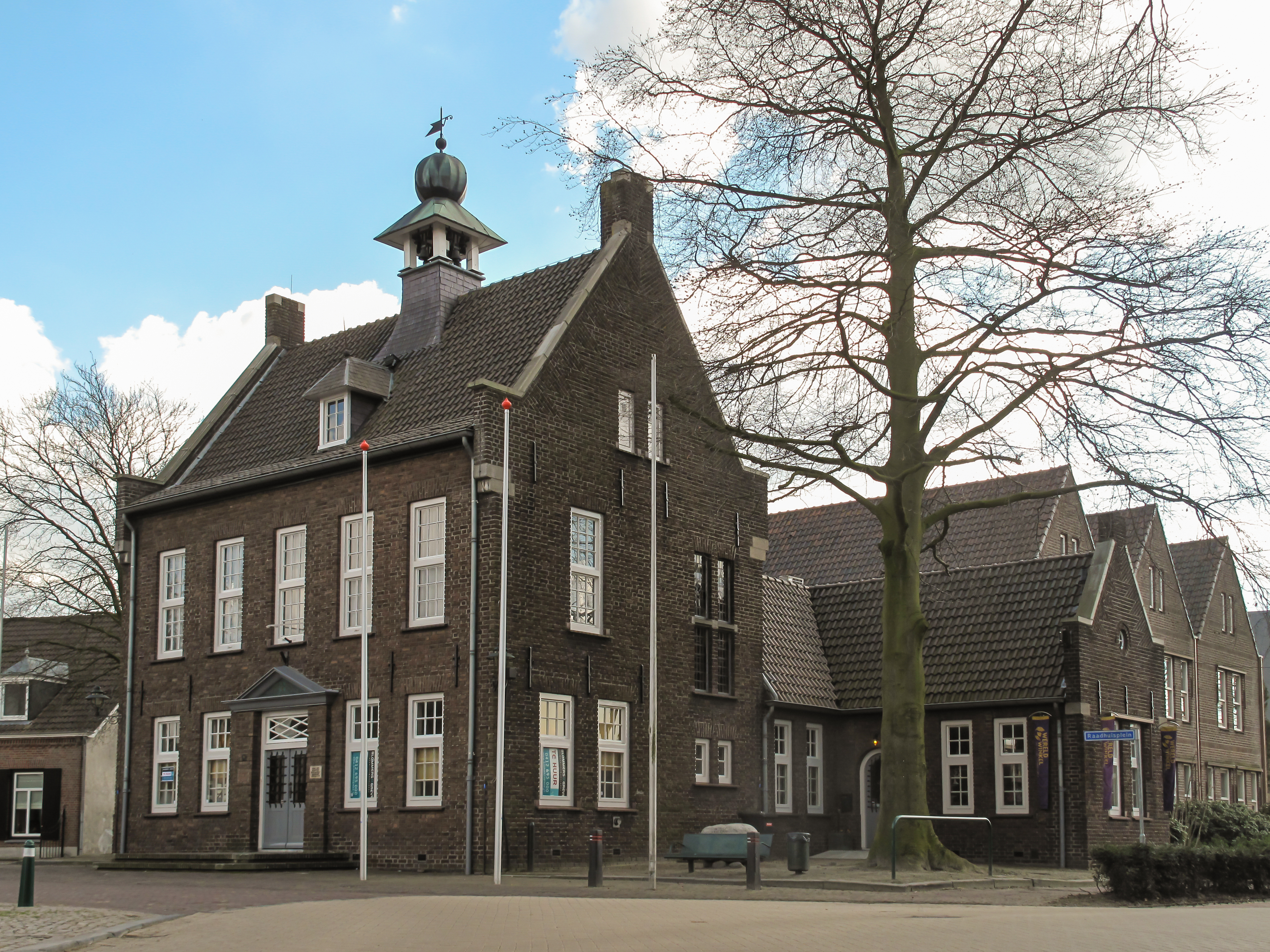
Former town hall

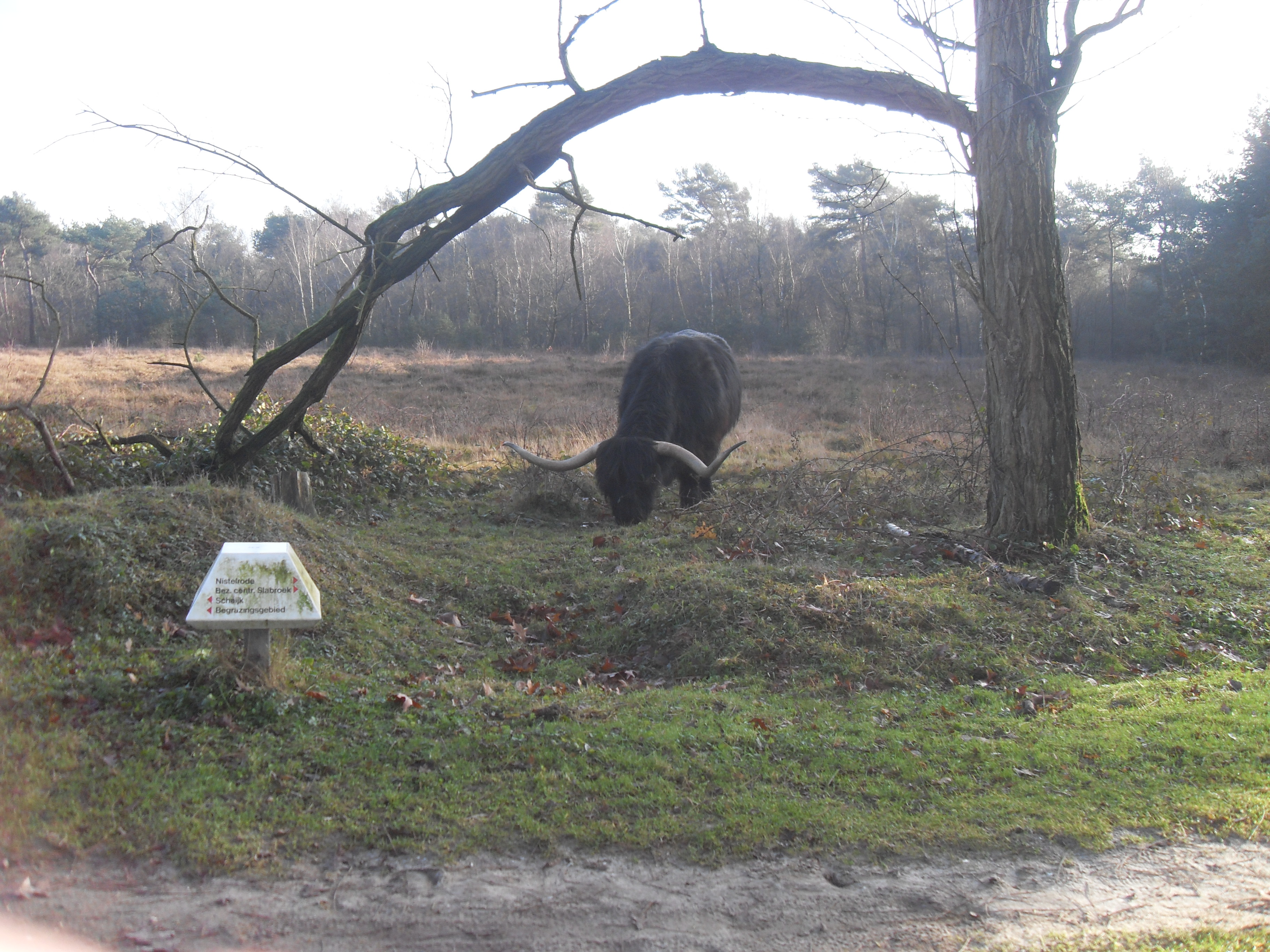
Cow grazing in the heath

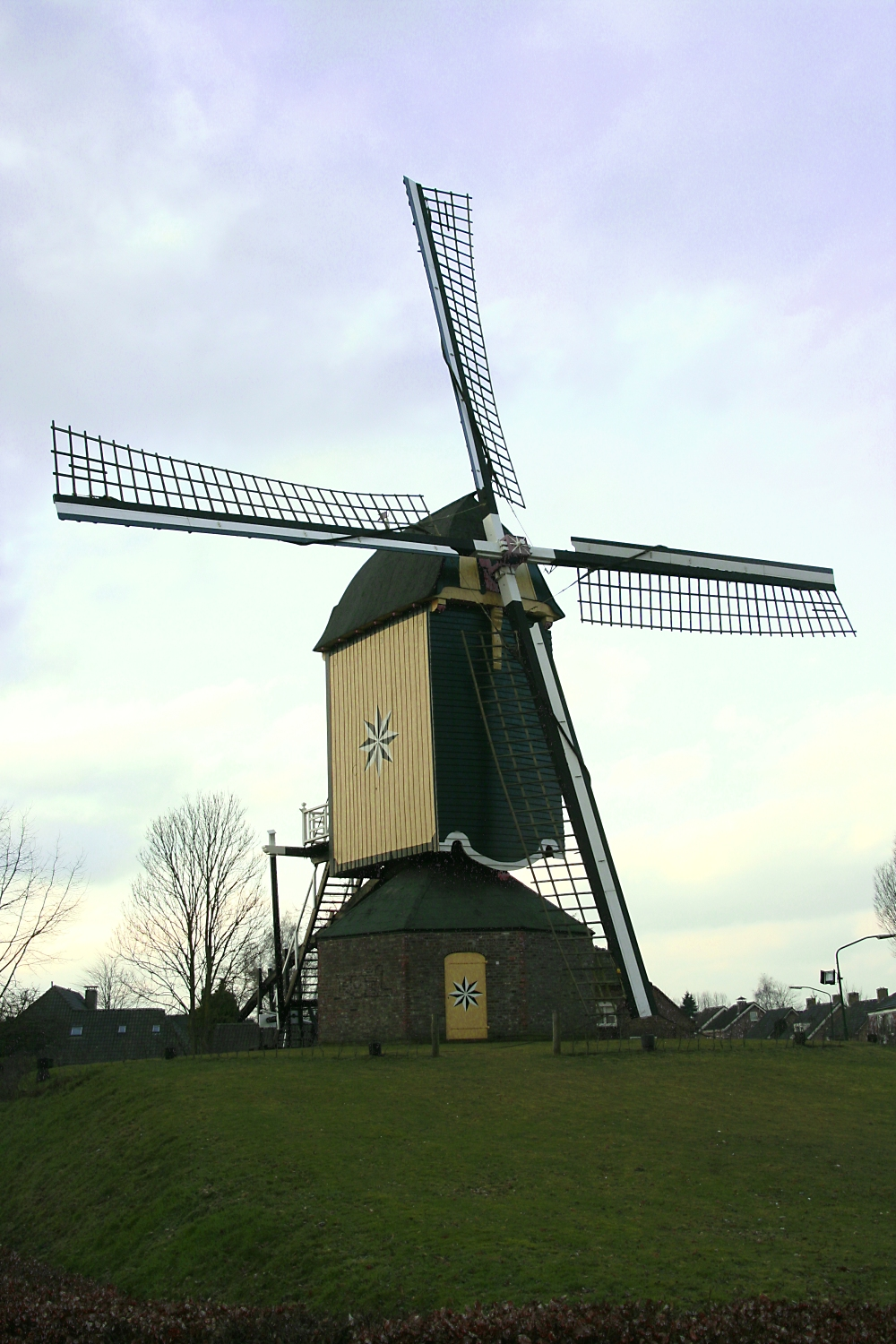
Wind mill Windlust

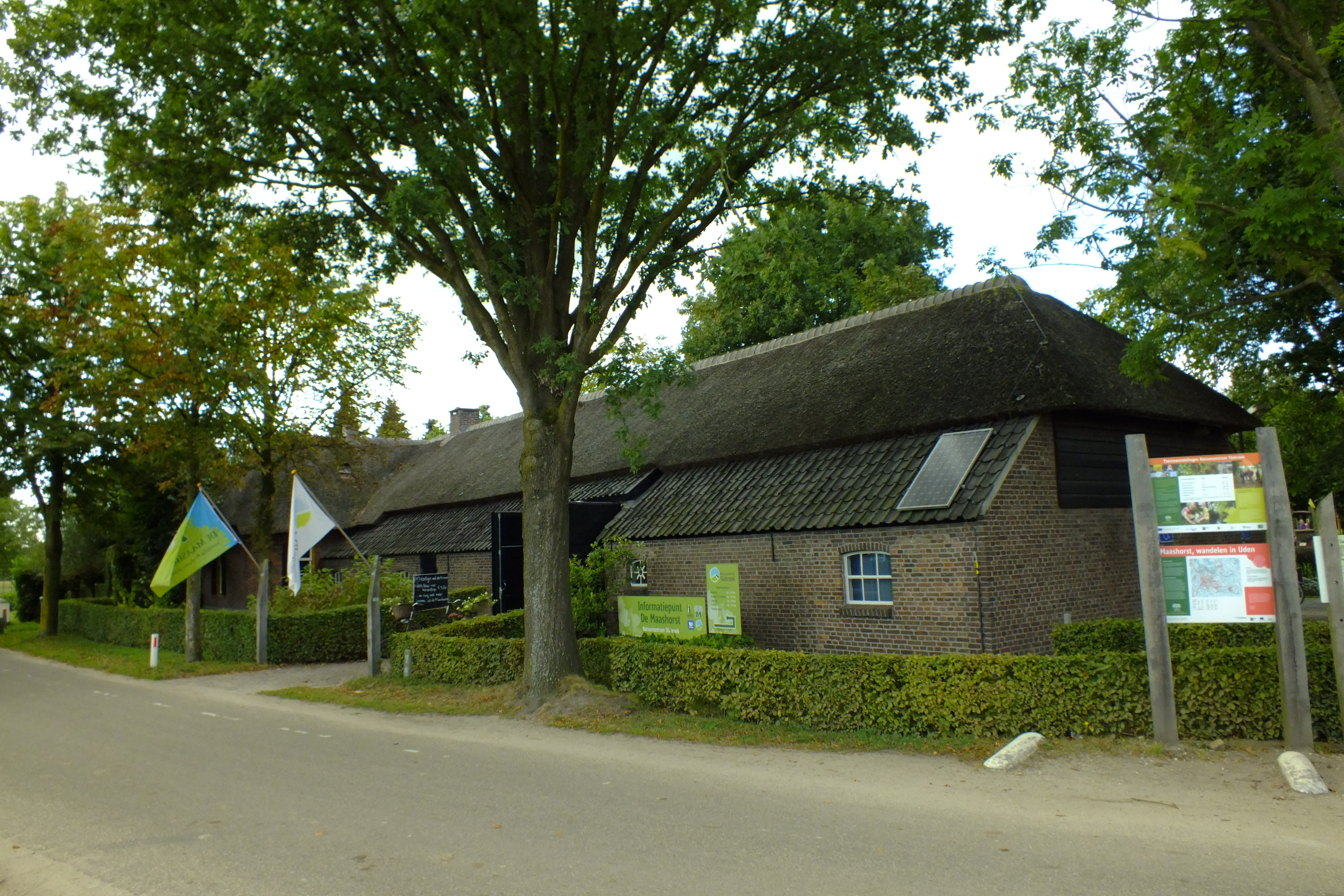
Visitors centre for the Maashort nature area
