= Bern, Netherlands =

Bern
- Hamlet
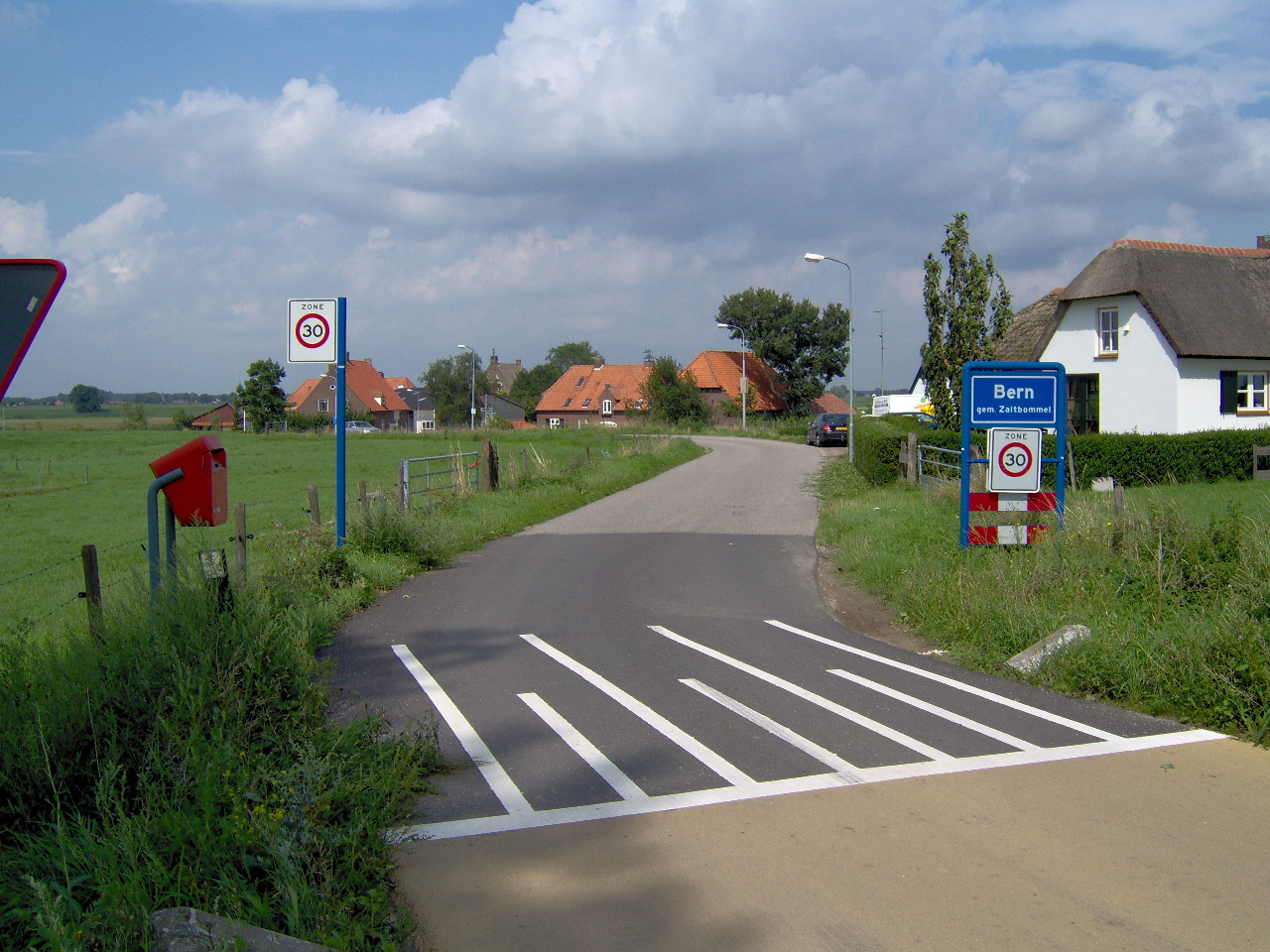
- View on Bern

- Coat of arms

- Location in the Netherlands Bern (Netherlands)
- Coordinates: 51°44′54″N 5°9′55″E
- Country: Netherlands
- Province: Gelderland
- Municipality: Zaltbommel
- Elevation: 5 m (16 ft)
- Time zone: UTC+1 (CET)
  - Summer (DST): UTC+2 (CEST)
- Postal code: 5318
- Dialing code: 0418

Bern (formerly sometimes "Beern", "Berne", or "Beerne") is a hamlet in the Dutch province of Gelderland. It is located in the municipality of Zaltbommel, about 10 kilometres (6.2 miles) south of the town Zaltbommel.

Bern used to lie south of the river Meuse, in the municipality of Herpt en Bern. The river was dammed close to Bern around 1900 (see Afgedamde Maas), and a new channel was dug south of the village, the Bergsche Maas. In 1958, the administrative borders were changed to account for this new situation, and Bern moved from the province of North Brabant to Gelderland, and to the municipality of Kerkwijk.

According to the 19th-century historian A.J. van der Aa, there used to be a castle in Bern, with a large tower and surrounded by walls. One of its owners, Fulco of Bern, made the castle into an abbey of the Premonstratensian order in 1134. It was inaugurated by the 25th bishop of Utrecht, Andreas of Cuyk. The abbey suffered during the Iconoclasm in 1566, and was almost completely burnt down in 1589 during the siege of Heusden by the Spanish army. It was never rebuilt, and in the middle of the 19th century, little remained of the Abbey of Bern.

Bern is not a statistical entity, however it has its own postal code. In 1840, it was home to 60 people. Nowadays, it has about 13 houses.

== Gallery ==
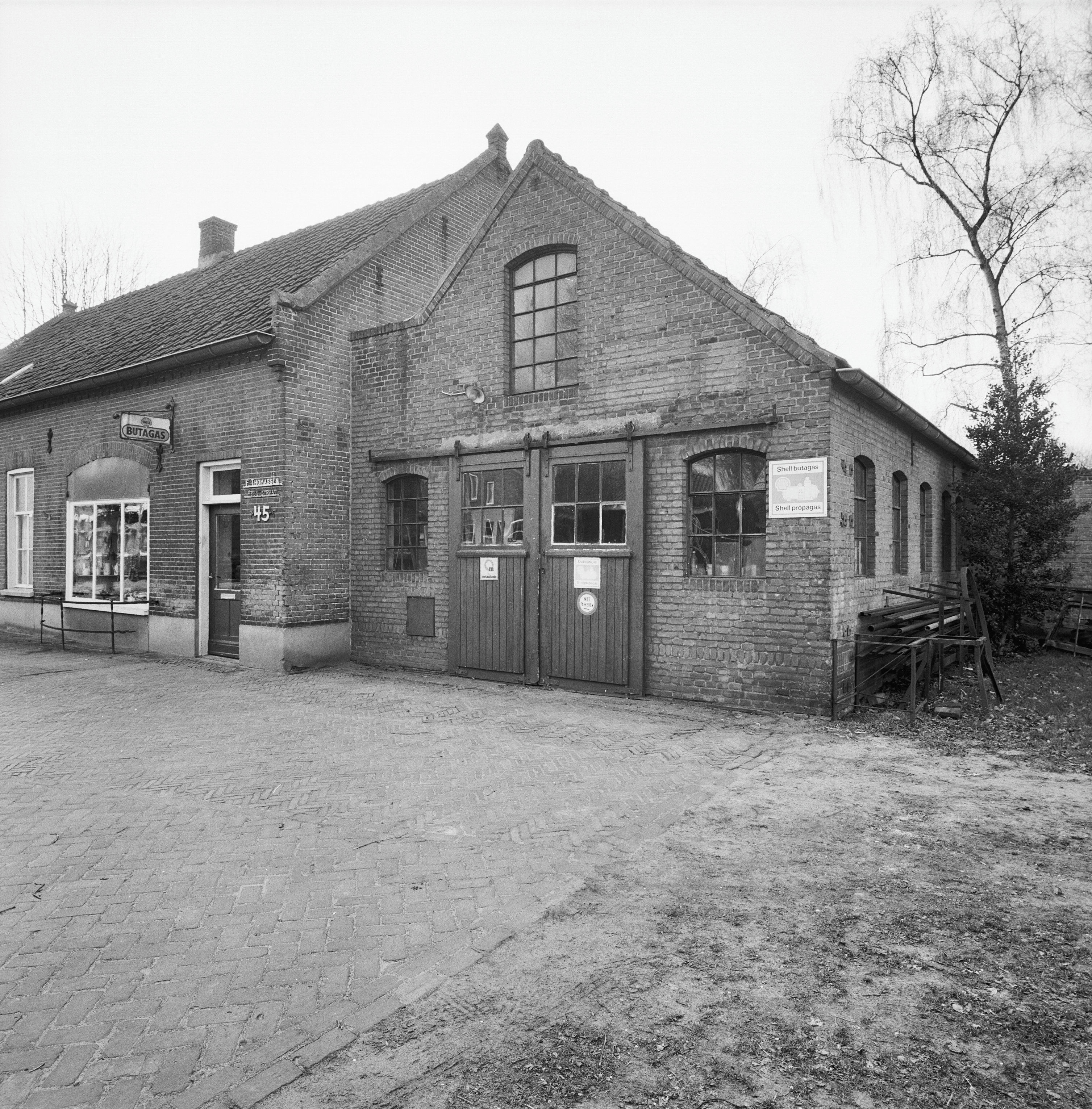
Former forge at Bern

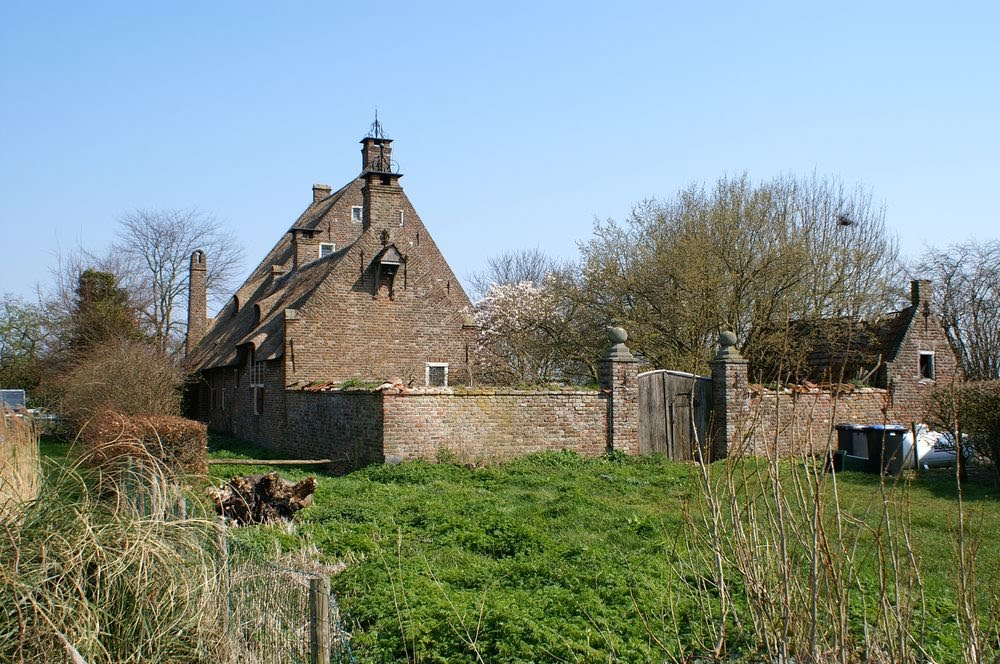
Huis Bern

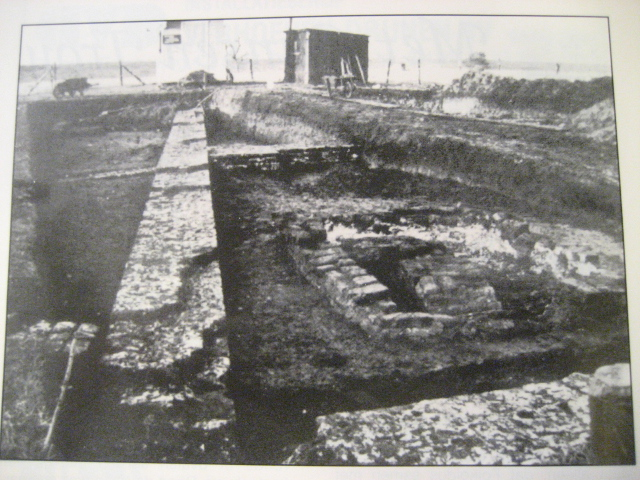
Excavation at the abbey (1962)

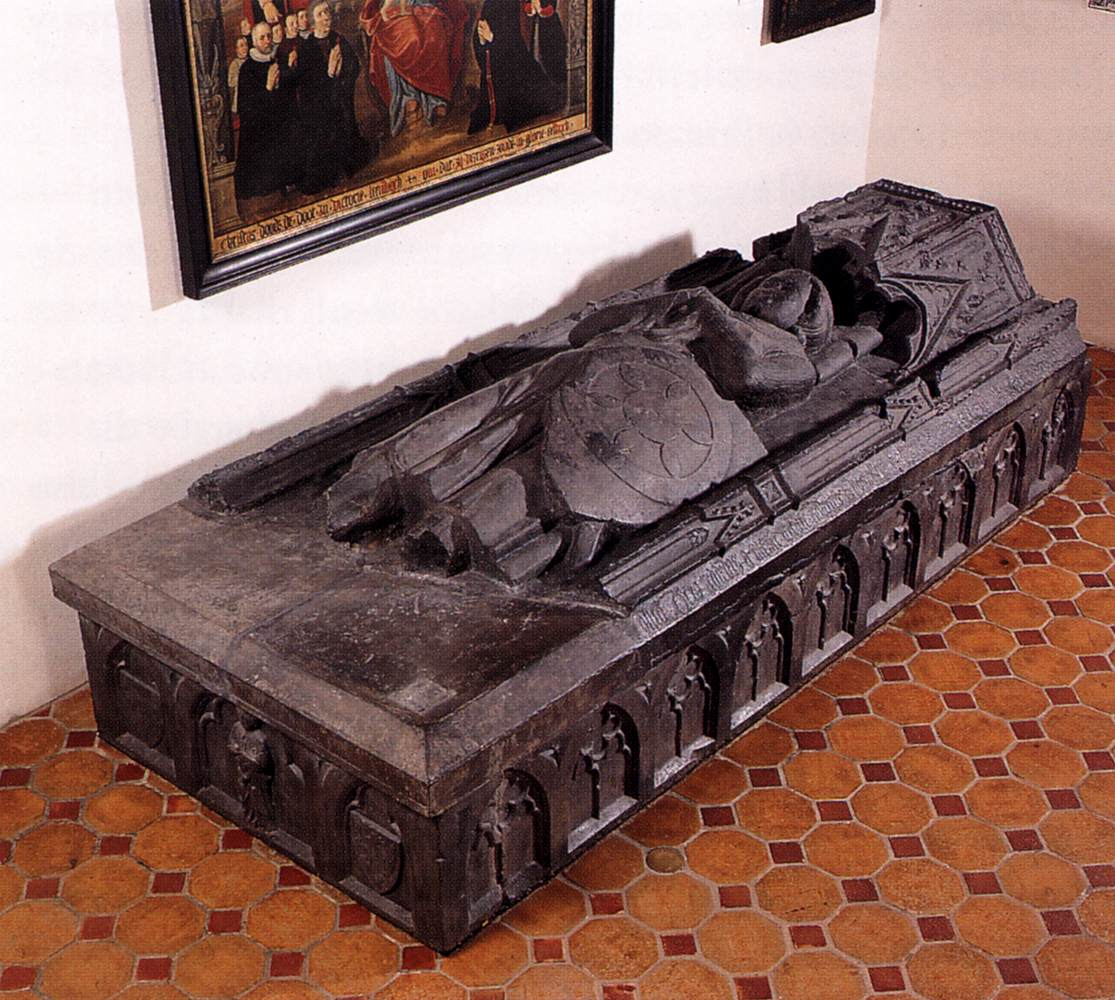
Tomb of Arnold van der Sluijs, originally at the abbey. Nowadays on display at Museum Catharijneconvent
