= Heusden Castle =

Castle in the Netherlands

- Kasteel Heusden
- Heusden, the Netherlands
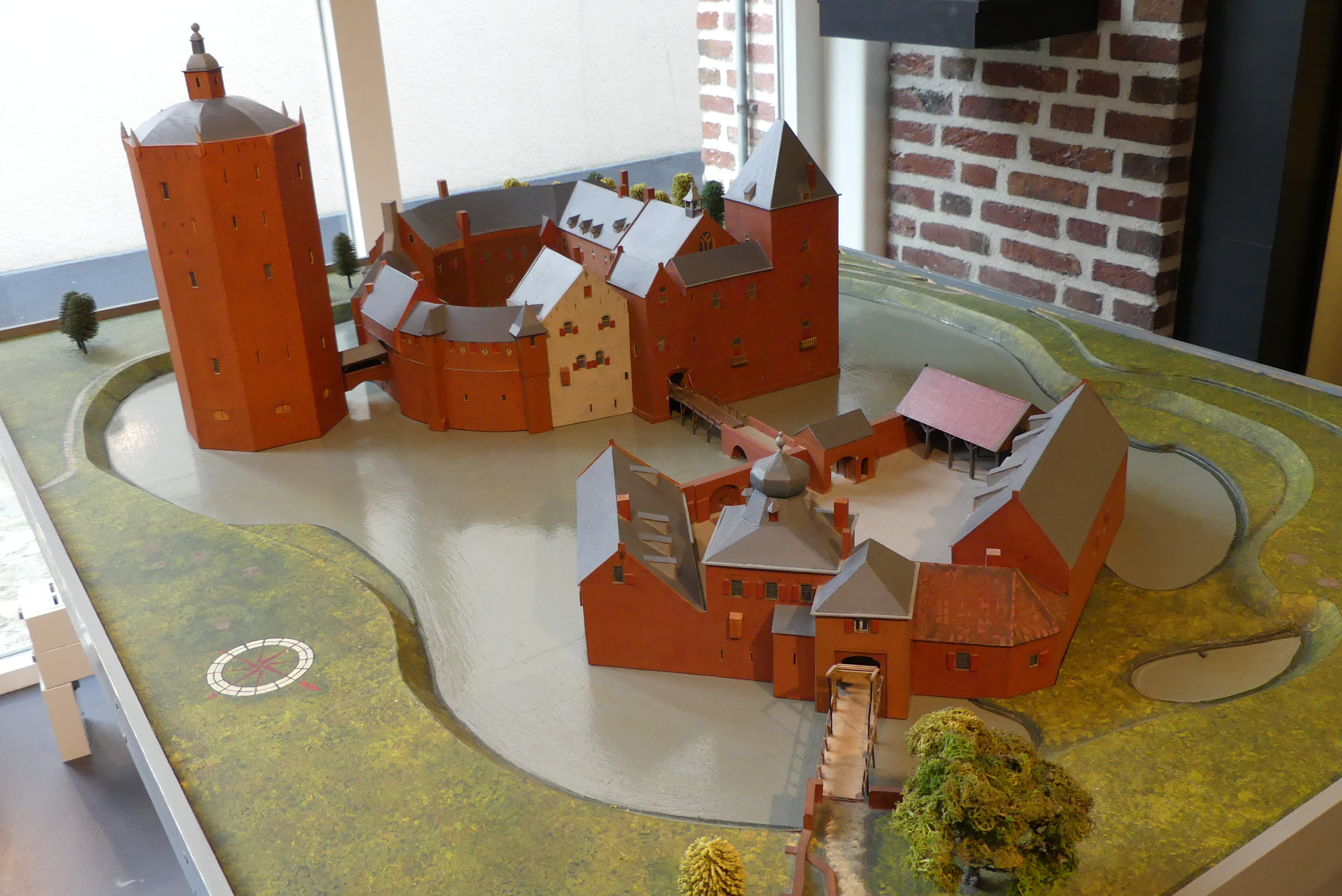
- Model of Heusden Castle before 1680

Site information
- Type: Castle
- Open to the public: Yes
- Condition: Restored ruins

Location
- The Netherlands
- Location within North Brabant
- Coordinates: 51.732899°N 5.134411°E

Site history
- Built: 12th century
- Demolished: Main castle:1680; Last tower:1890

Heusden Castle is a ruined major castle in Heusden.

== History ==
In the 12th century the lords of Heusden had a territory which stretched on both sides of the Oude Maasje. At the time, this was the main course of the Meuse. In the part south of the Oude Maasje was the main village Oudheusden with a church. In 1130 the main castle of the Lord of Heusden was near this church, on the left bank of the Oude Maasje. At that time, the village Oudheusden was simply called Heusden. In 1202 this castle was destroyed by the Duke of Brabant.

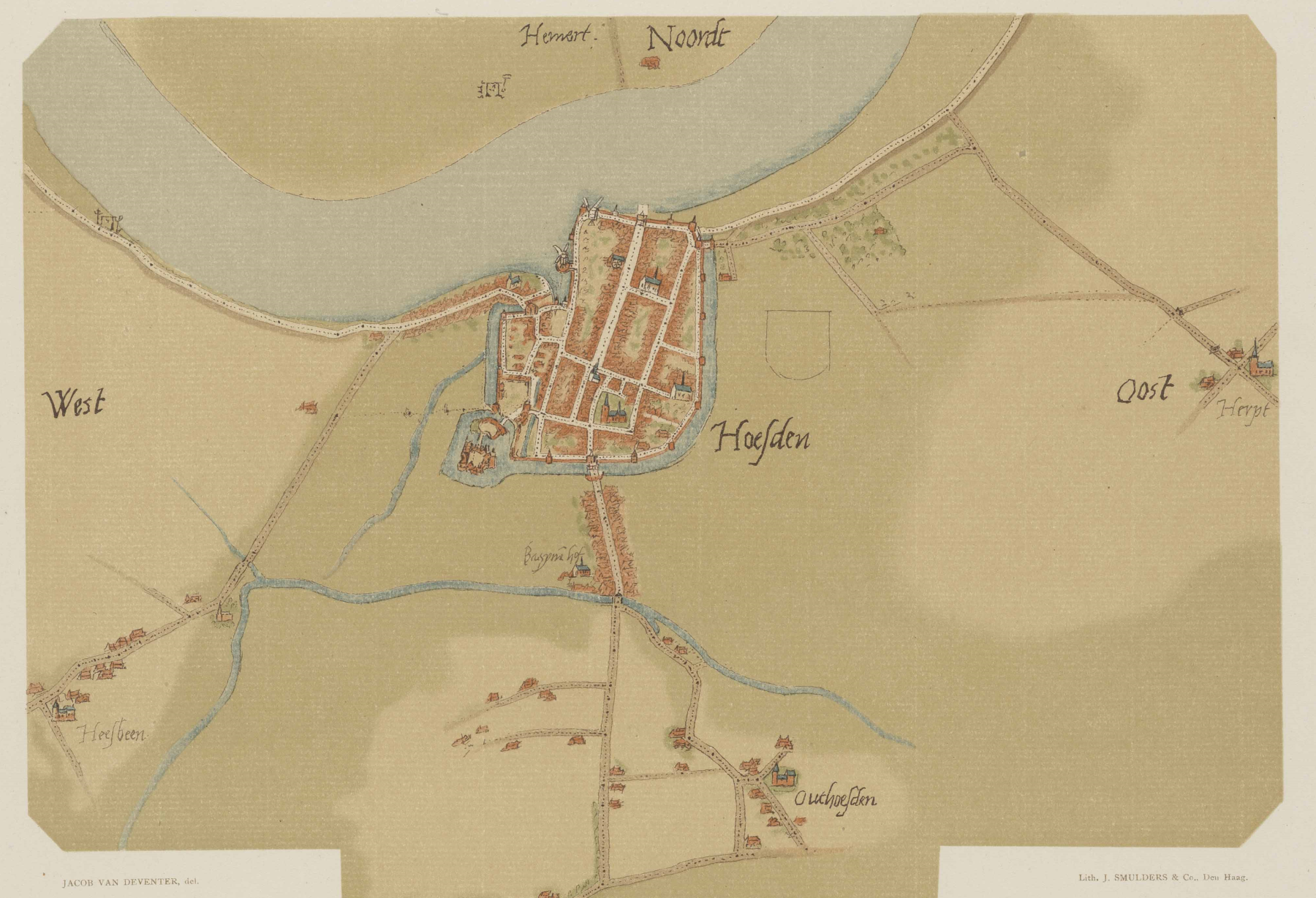
Heusden and Oudheusden c. 1558 - 1575

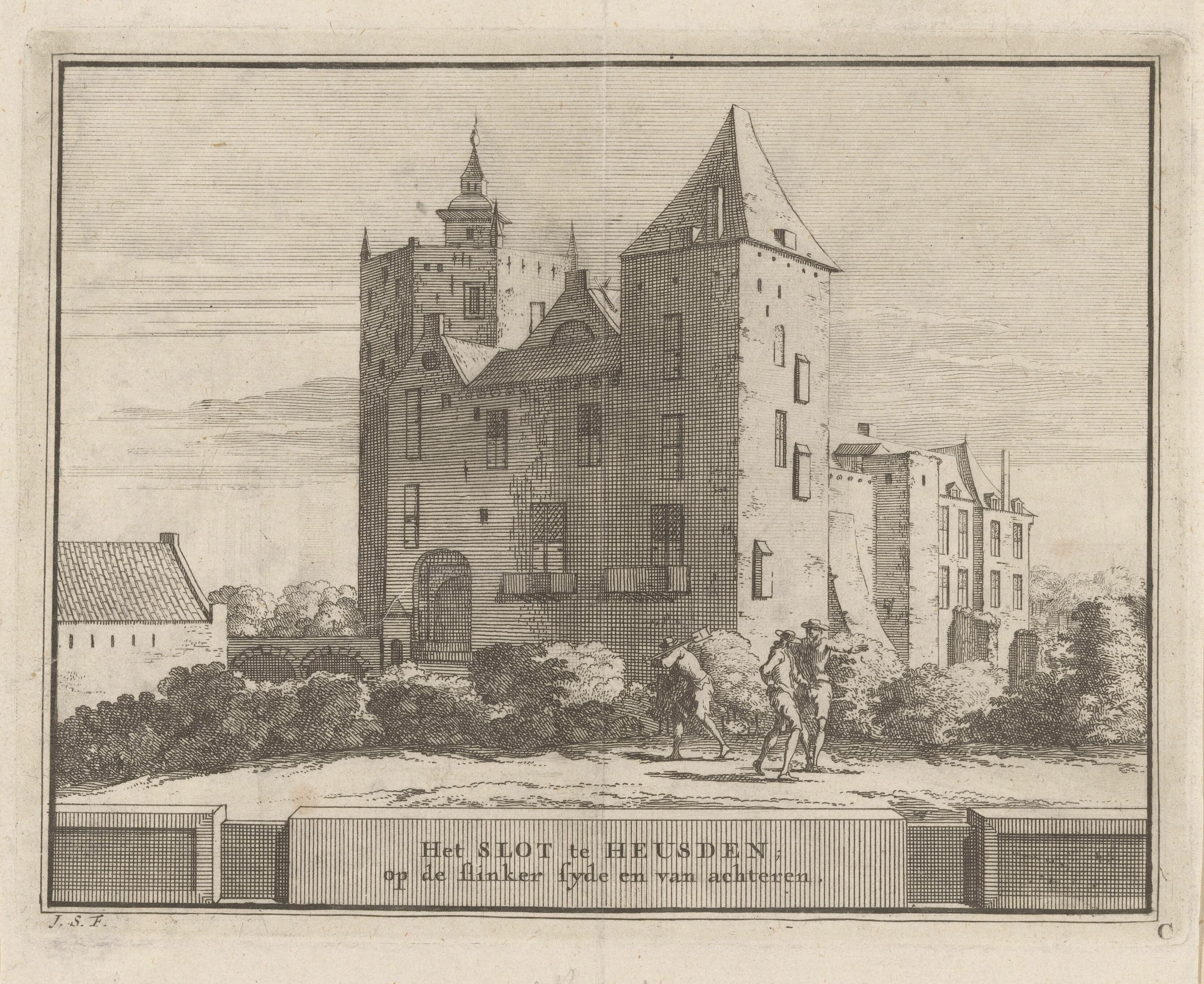
Old drawing

After the destruction of his castle, the Lord of Heusden moved his seat to the current Heusden. Heusden was first known as Husdenredam. It was a new settlement north of the Oude Maasje on a meander of the Meuse. The new settlement was also east of a north–south water which connected the Oude Maasje to the Meuse. Close to this north–south connection, a new castle was built, probably as a direct consequence of this move.

The first version of Heusden Castle consisted of an octagonal stone tower and square stone building on a motte. A brick ring wall was added in the late 13th century or first half of the 14th century. In 1279 Jan III of Heusden came into conflict with Brabant, and his castle was besieged and taken. After pledging allegiance to Brabant he got his castle back. In 1316 Jan IV, the debt-ridden last ruling lord of Heusden died. His underage half brother Jan V then came under the tutelage of Jan van den Elshout, who sold the castle to Brabant. Jan van den Elshout then received the castle back as a personal loan. The sister of Jan IV then sold her pretensions to Holland, leading to a siege by William III of Holland in 1318. In the end the castle was given to Jan V as a loan of Brabant.

After the death of Jan V in 1330, the claims of the Brabant dukes as Lords of Heusden became indisputable. John III, Duke of Brabant therefore started to invest in its expansion as a border fortress against Holland. Castellan Jan van Wijtvliet directed the works, which started in 1338. In about 1340 the construction of the very imposing octagonal donjon started. It was finished by Joanna, Duchess of Brabant, shortly after 1355. Joanna would also finish the city's fortifications.

In 1357 Heusden and its castle were reattached to the County of Holland. During the Hook and Cod wars Delft was besieged in 1359. The Cod knights Gijsbrecht van Nijenrode and Jan van Kervena escaped and fled to Heusden. Here they were besieged for a long time before surrendering on terms. In 1420 Heusden chose the Hook side. Jacqueline, Countess of Hainaut was often at the castle.

In the first half of the 16th century Heusden was in the front line of the Guelders Wars (1502-1543). In the beginning of the Eighty Years' War Kapitein Waardenburg took Heusden for the rebel side in 1572. The loyalist commander Spiering van Wel retreated to the castle. A gunpowder accident then caused a fire that would later become known as the Grote stadsbrand van Heusden, leaving most of the city in ashes. It made such an impression that Spiering van Wel left the town to the rebels.

Between 1581 and 1589 the fortifications of Heusden were expanded. They were finished during the Twelve Years' Truce (1609-1621). The castle no longer had a defensive function. It was henceforward used by the garrison. The big octagonal tower was used as storage for gunpowder. In 1620 a big tower on the southwestern side collapsed, and was not rebuilt. In this condition the castle was drawn by Roelant Roghman in 1646–1647.

On 24 July 1680 lightning hit the donjon of the castle. In the donjon there was about 60,000 pounds of gunpowder, as well as grenades. The castle was almost completely destroyed, and of the donjon only a crater filled with black water was left. About 60-70 people died, and many houses in the surroundings were destroyed. Only one square tower survived more or less intact. In 1823 this tower was also demolished.

In 1824 the ruins of the castle were cleaned up. Only the high square tower which survived the blast more or less intact was left (see 1691 drawing). This tower became a new gunpowder magazine. The rest of the terrain was turned into a parade ground and park. In 1889 the tower still had a roof, when it was sold to a contractor for break up.

== Characteristics of the Castle ==
=== The motte and bailey castle ===
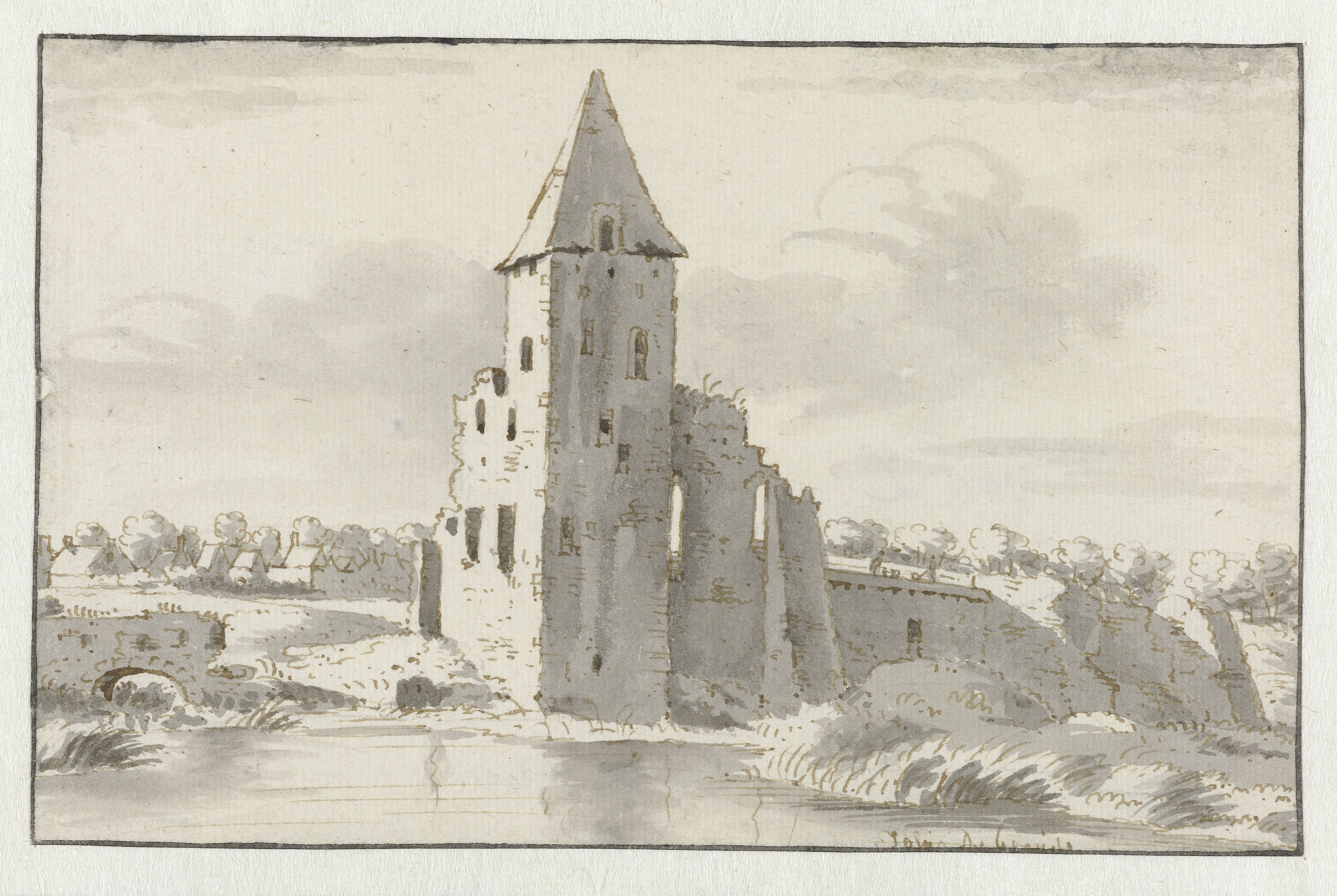
1691 drawing of the ruins

The first version of the castle at the current location was a Motte-and-bailey castle dated to about 1200. In its center, the circular main castle had an octagonal tower with a diameter of 8 m. On the northeast side was a square building of 10 by 10 meters. Both buildings had their foundations on ground level, except for the north-eastern side of the square building, which side had deeper foundations. From the outside of the circle, ground had been added till a level of at least more than 2 m high around the octagonal tower. This way a motte was created.

The octagonal tower had walls which were 2 m thick at ground level, and were made of Meuse limestone. The square building had walls of 1 m thick on three sides. These were made of formwork of regular tuff stones of about 40 by 10 cm, filled with pieces of tuff and limestone. The building's northeastern wall, which was on the outside of the main castle, was much heavier. It had formwork of square limestones filled with pieces of tuff.

If one supposes that the castle was started after the Lords of Heusden moves from Oudheusden to Heusden, this motte castle can be dated to shortly after 1202. For Jaap Renaud, the leader of the excavations, the use of stone instead of brick was reason to date it to before 1200. An outer bailey was also present at the time, but its earliest form is not that clear.

=== The water castle ===
The second version of the castle was a water castle. It was created by the construction in the late 13th century or early 14th century of heavy 3 m thick brick ring wall with buttresses. The buttresses may have been built for small overhanging towers. Next to the square building a gate house was built. On the western side the ring wall was straight. This was no doubt done so quarters could be built on that side. The outer bailey that was partly uncovered by the excavations also dates from this phase. The initial dates that Renaud gave for this phase could later be refuted, when it proved that the brick used during this phase was already in use in the late 13th century.

=== The town citadel ===
The third version of the castle was a town citadel. After Brabant conquered Heusden in 1328, the construction of a huge 40 m high donjon with walls of 4 m thick was started by John III, Duke of Brabant, and finished by his heir Joanna (1322 – 1406). This second octagonal tower replaced the first octagonal tower. Somewhat later, two big square towers were added on the northwest side.

== The Ruins ==
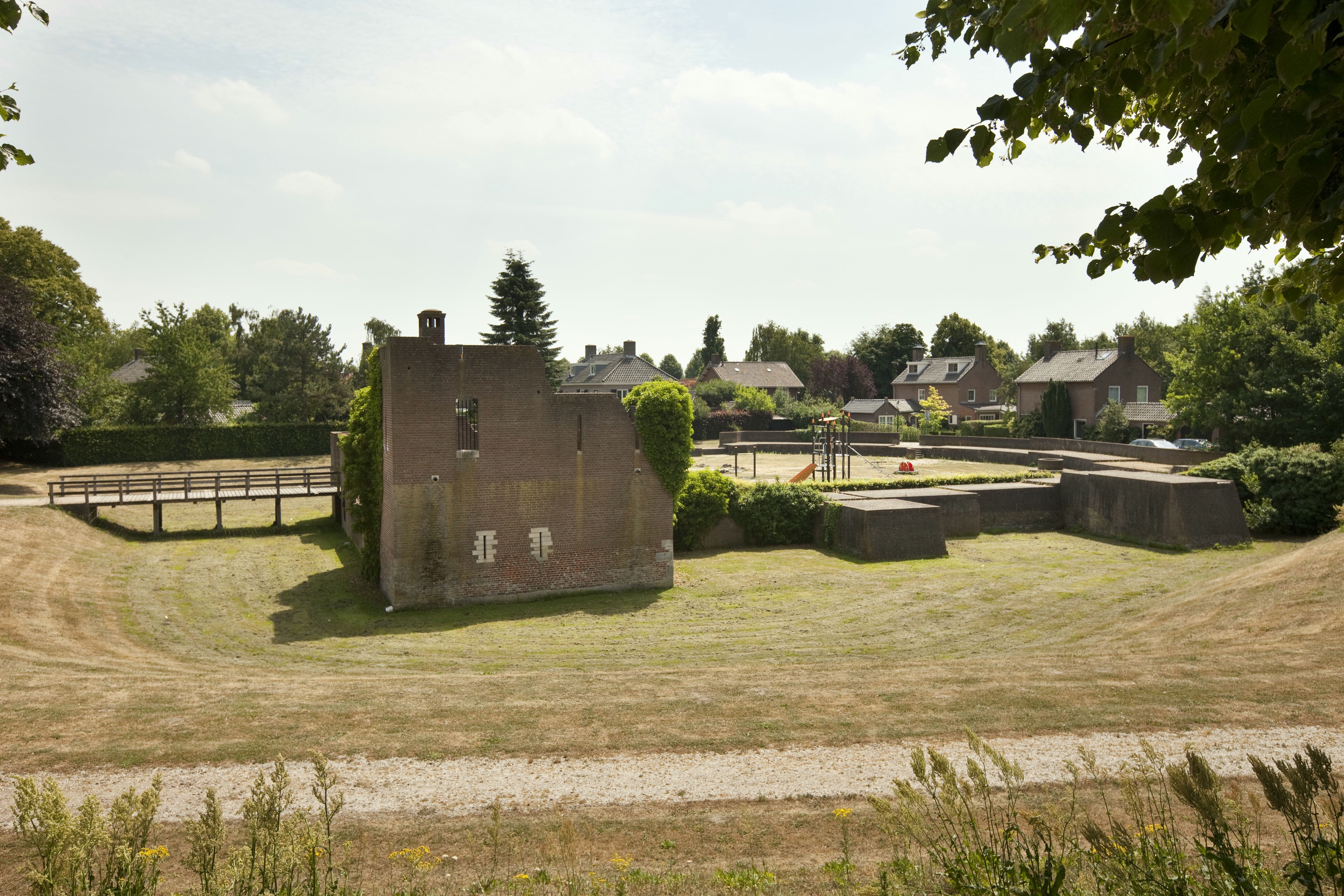
The castle ruins in 2010

In 1948 archaeological excavations were led by Jaap Renaud. After the excavations the foundations were covered again in 1949, and a small deer park was established. A new Catholic church had been built over the outer bailey before excavations could take place.

In 1987 it was decided to partially reconstruct the ruins of the castle. That is, of the ruins of the main castle, without the donjon and outer bailey. This reconstruction contains elements of the original castle, but has been judged a failure. Criticism was that it is the vision of an architect, and had little to do with the original castle. Others say that the reconstruction is based on Renaud's excavation. For visitors, the problem is that 95% of what is now visible is reconstruction. The terrain then looks like a park with some strange walls. The castle experience could become clearer if the ruins would stand in the water.

In 2012 the municipality of Heusden surprised its citizens. It revealed a plan to let a consortium of real estate developer Amvest, Schakelring Heusden and Service Residentie Molenwijck redevelop the ruins. It would build 63 luxury apartments for senior citizens on top of the ruins. This would be combined with an underground parking lot below. Many heritage organizations and local residents were not amused by the plan. It threatened the monument, and could hardly be reconciled with the legal status of Heusden as a Beschermd Stadsgezicht (protected cityscape). In December 2012 the initiative was cancelled.
