= Hedikhuizen =

- Village
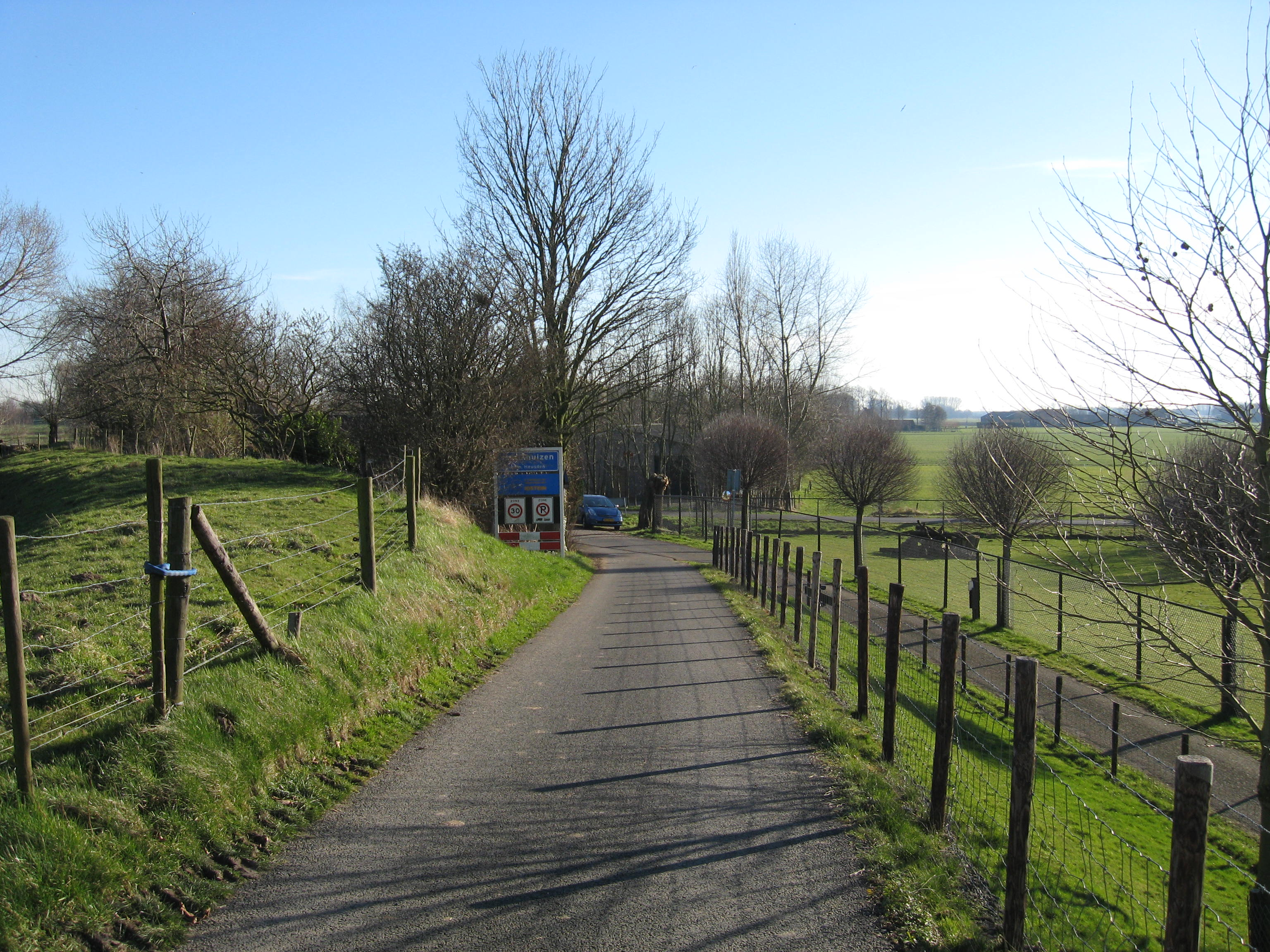
- From the dike towards Hedikhuizen

- Coat of arms

- Location within North Brabant Location within Netherlands
- Coordinates: 51°44′8″N 5°11′2″E
- Country: Netherlands
- Province: North Brabant
- Municipality: Heusden

Area
  - Total: 5.97 km^{2} (2.31 sq mi)

Population (2021)
  - Total: 275
  - Density: 46.1/km^{2} (119/sq mi)
- Time zone: UTC+1 (CET)
  - Summer (DST): UTC+2 (CEST)
- Postal code: 5257
- Dialing code: 0416

Hedikhuizen is a village in the Dutch province of North Brabant. It is located in the municipality of Heusden, about 3 km east of that city.

== History ==
The village was first mentioned in 997 as Hittinchusen, and means "settlement of the people of Hiddo (person)". Hedikhuizen is a linear settlement along the dike of the Maas. In 1773, the river was canalised and the meander on which Hedikhuizen is situated was cut off.

The former Dutch Reformed church dated from the 15th century, and had a 13th-century tower. In 1944, it was severely damaged by war. Parts of the tower have been used to restore the western side. The building is nowadays a residential home and studio.

Fort Hedikhuizen was part of the defensive works for the city of Heusden. The fort was built between 1860 and 1863, but became obsolete in 1886. Hedikhuizen was home to 227 people in 1840.

Hedikhuizen was a separate municipality until 1935, when the municipality was divided between Vlijmen and Heusden. The village of Hedikhuizen became part of Heusden.

== Gallery ==
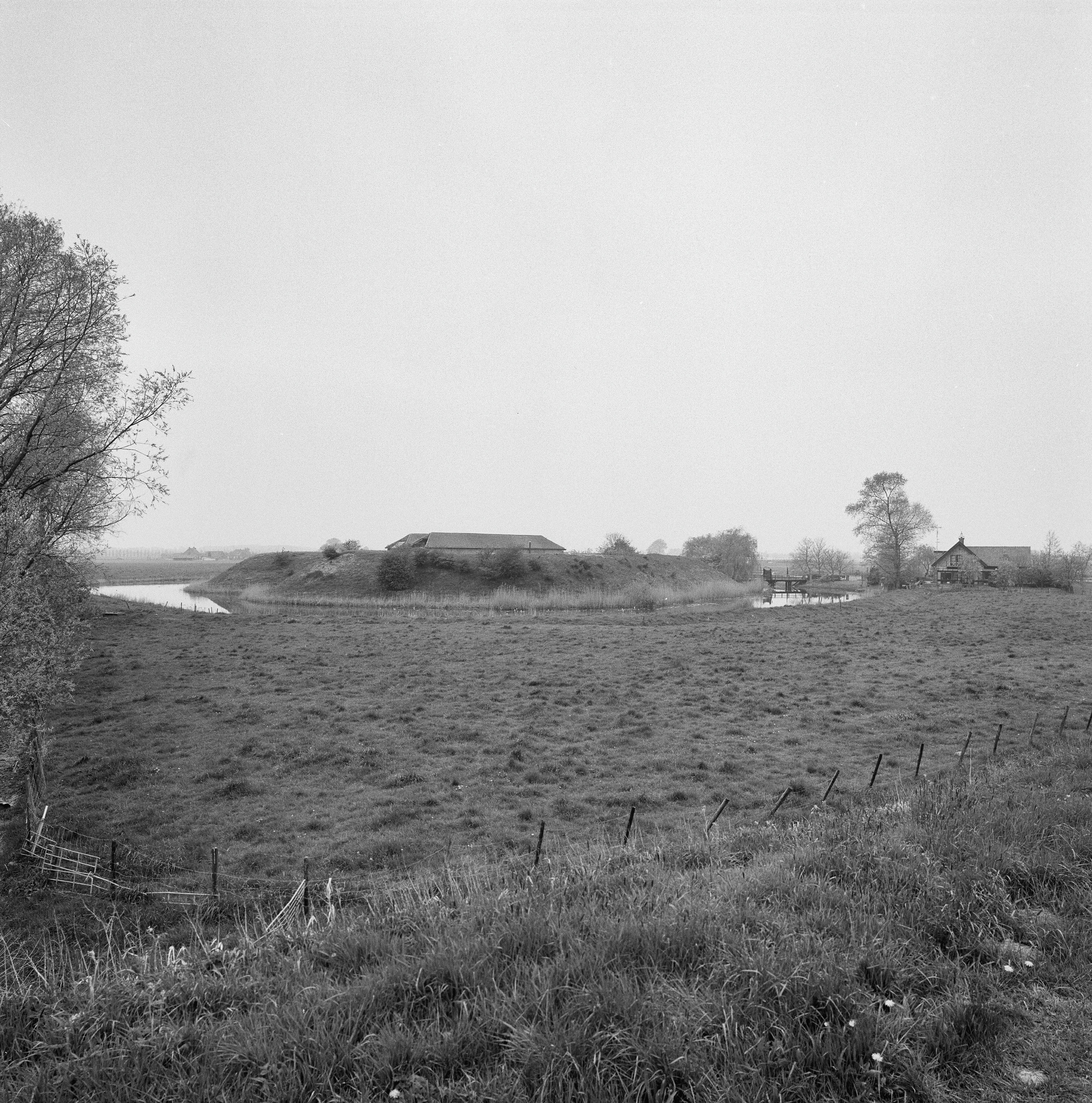
Interior of the chapel of Fort Hedikhuizen (1997)

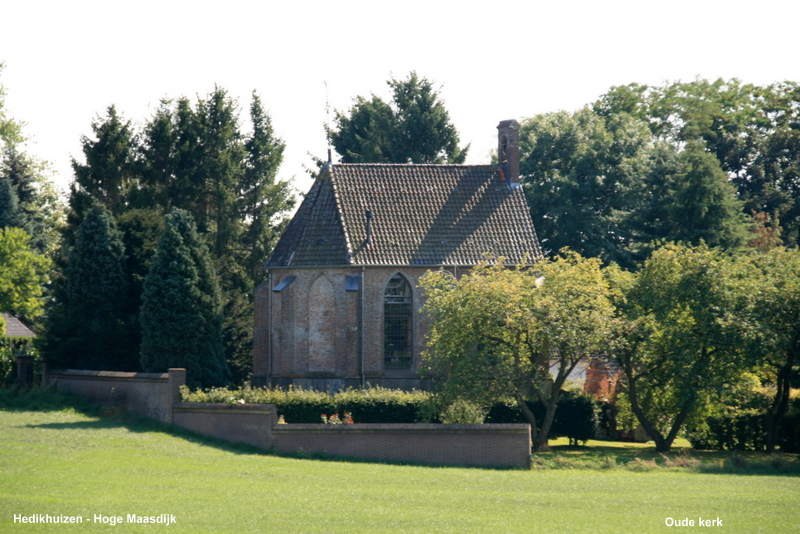
Remnants of the Dutch Reformed church

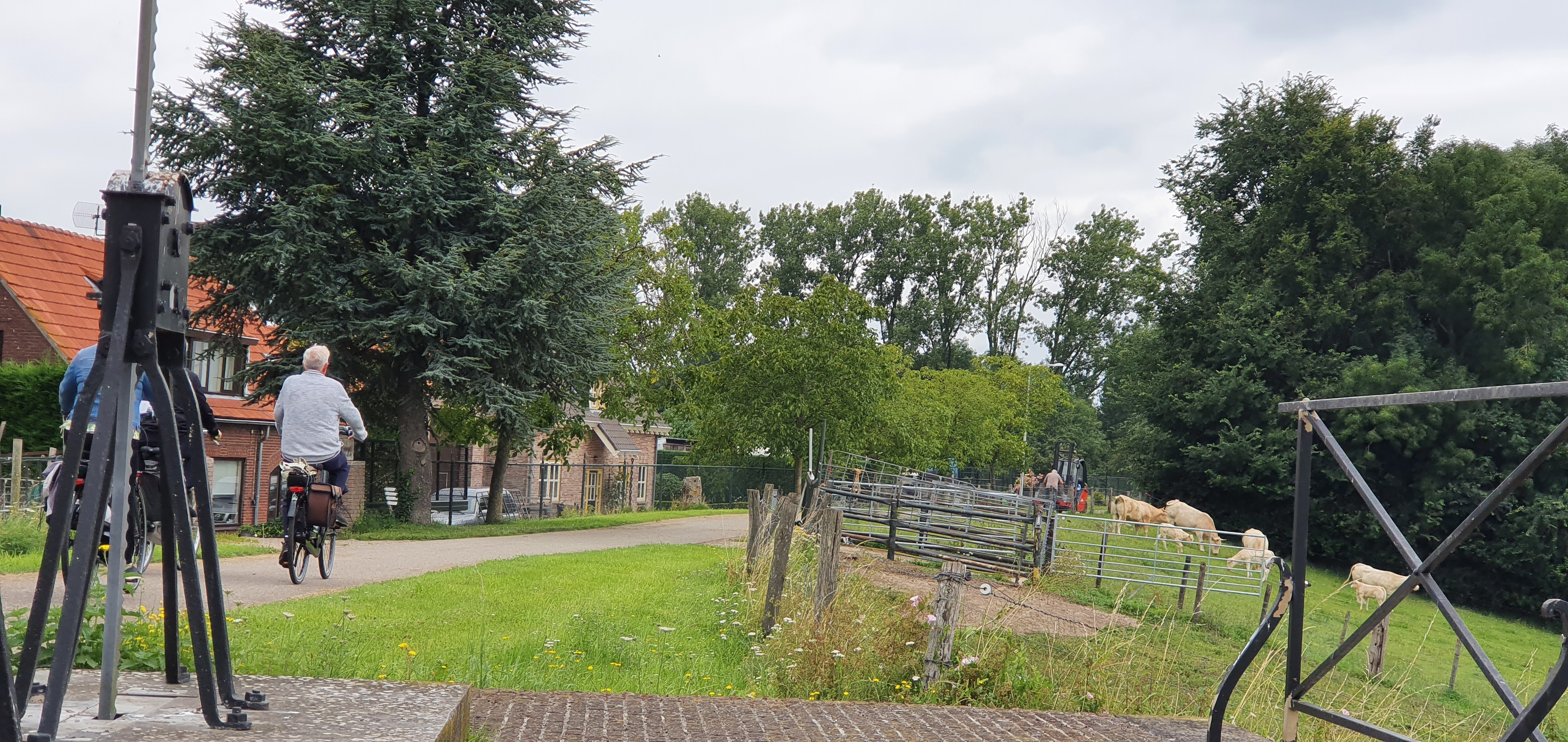
The dike near Hedikhuizen

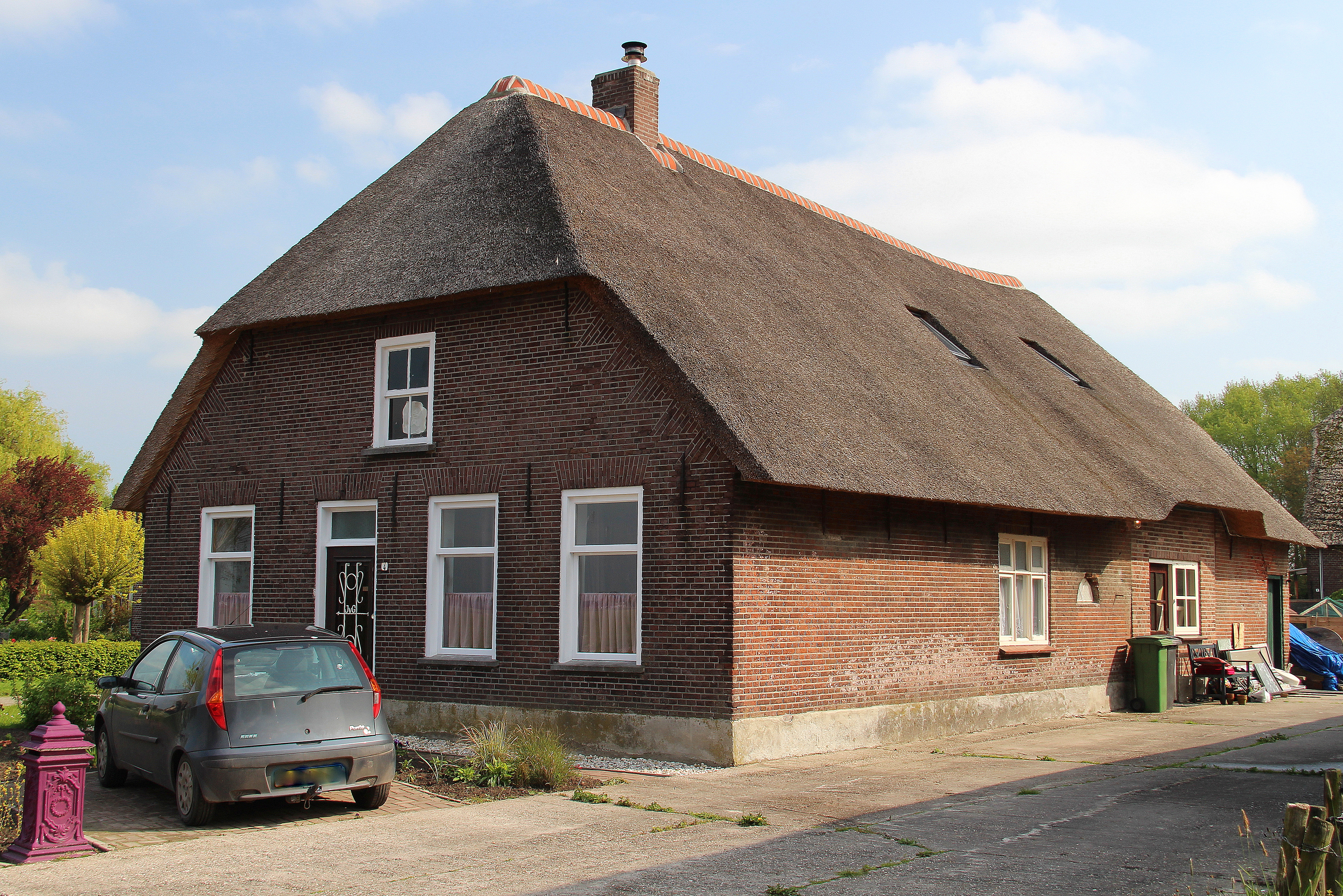
Farm in Hedikhuizen
