= Herpt =

- Village
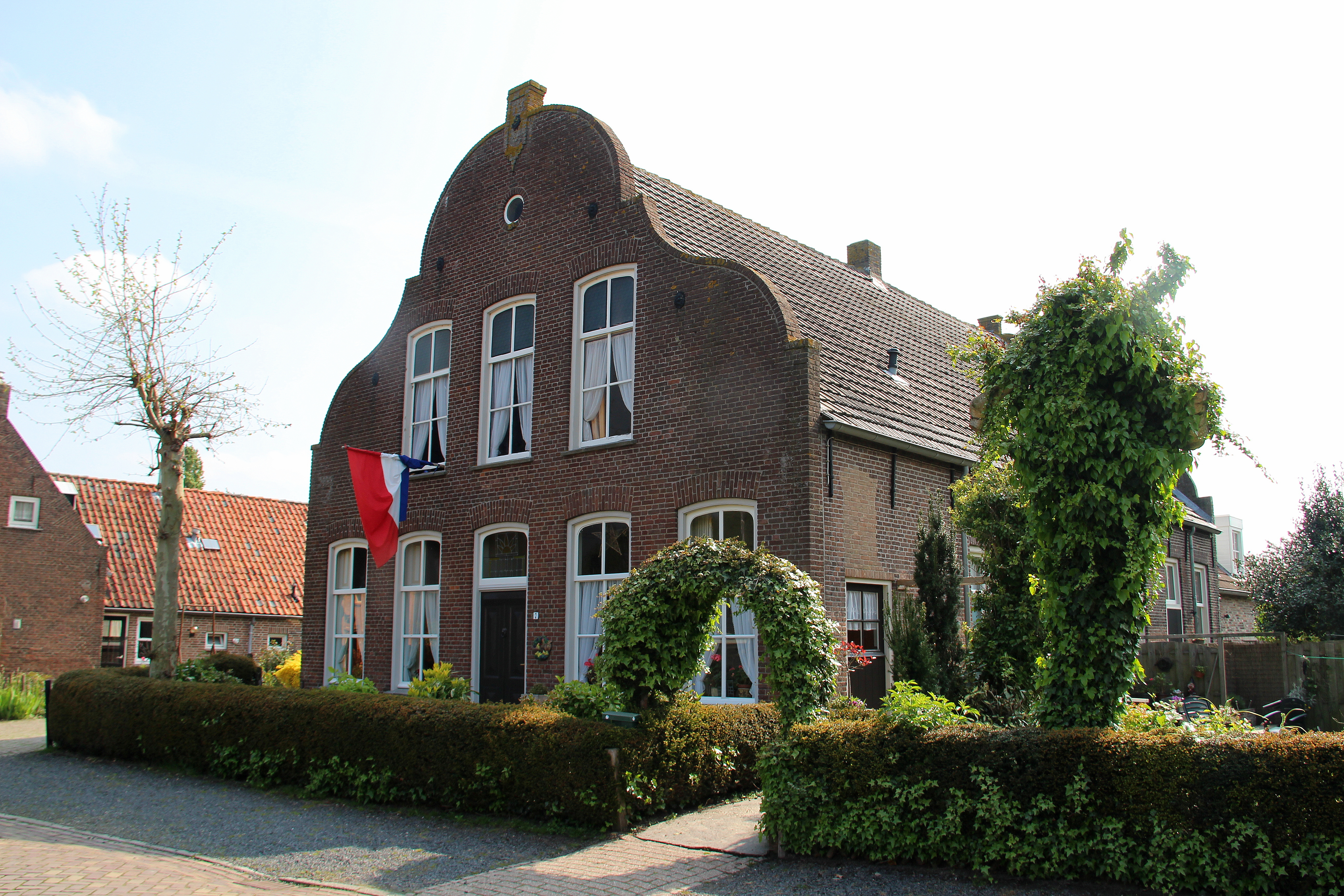
- Farm in Herpt

- Coat of arms

- Location in the province of North Brabant in the Netherlands Herpt (Netherlands)
- Coordinates: 51°44′0″N 5°9′0″E
- Country: Netherlands
- Province: North Brabant
- Municipality: Heusden

Area
  - Total: 5.44 km^{2} (2.10 sq mi)

Population (2021)
  - Total: 760
  - Density: 140/km^{2} (360/sq mi)
- Time zone: UTC+1 (CET)
  - Summer (DST): UTC+2 (CEST)
- Postal code: 5255
- Dialing code: 0416

Herpt is a village in the municipality of Heusden in the Dutch province of North Brabant, about one kilometre southeast of the city center.

== History ==
The village was first mentioned between 1108 and 1121 Harpede. The etymology is unclear.

The Dutch Reformed church dated from the 15th century, but was destroyed on 5 November 1944 by the Germans and not rebuilt. The Catholic church dates from 1924.

Herpt was home to 380 people in 1840. Herpt was a separate municipality until 1935 (sometimes called Herpt en Bern or Herpt c.a.), when it became a part of Heusden.

== Gallery ==
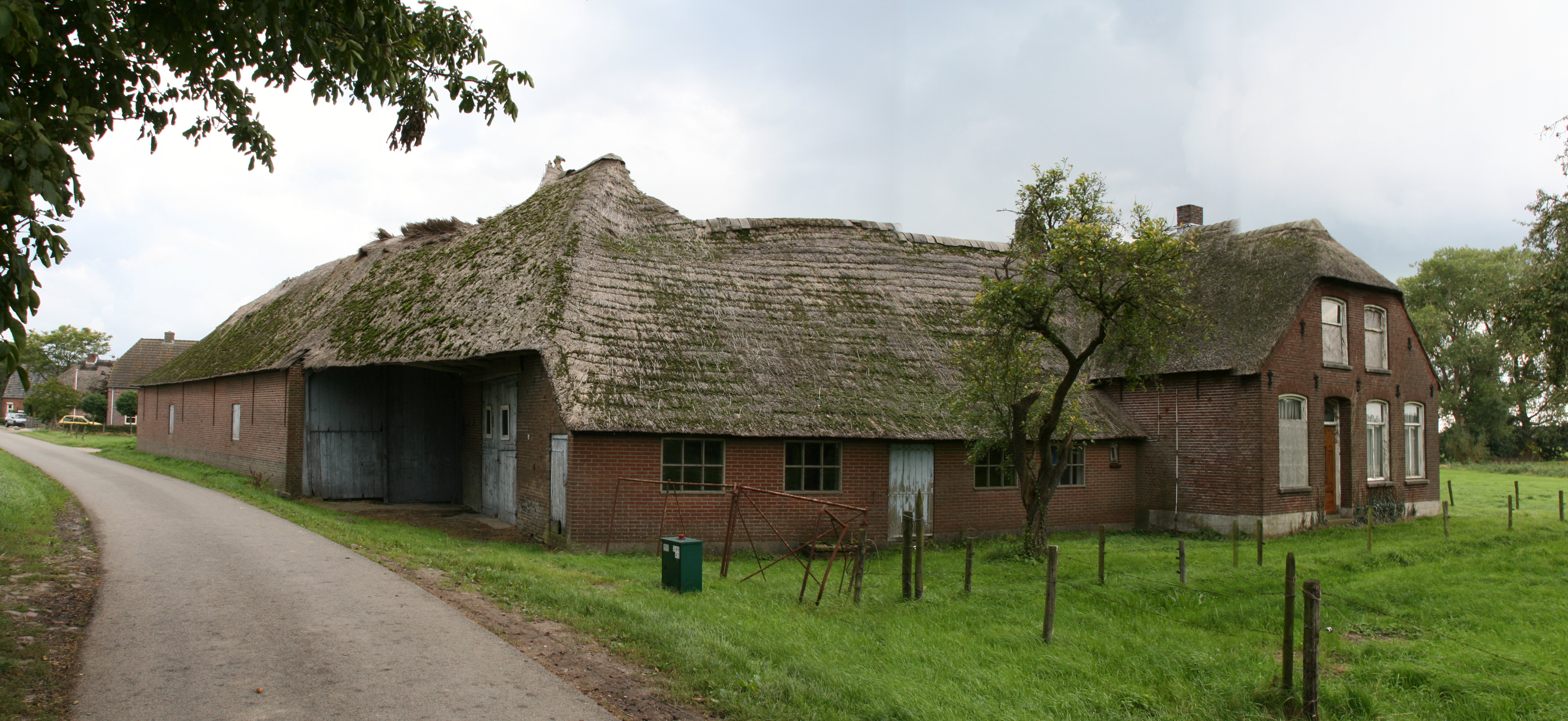
Farm in Herpt

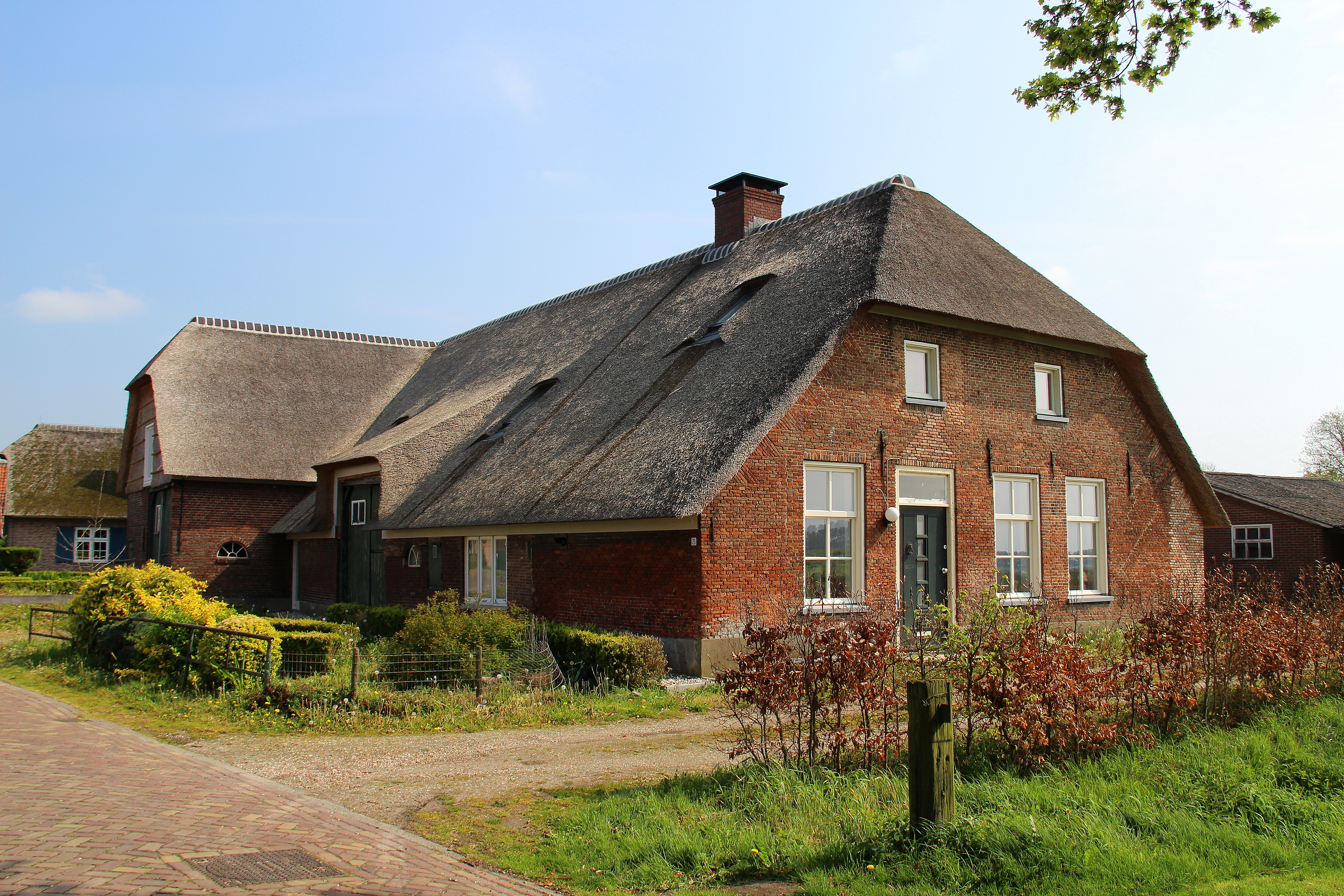
Farm in Herpt
