= Oudheusden =

- Village
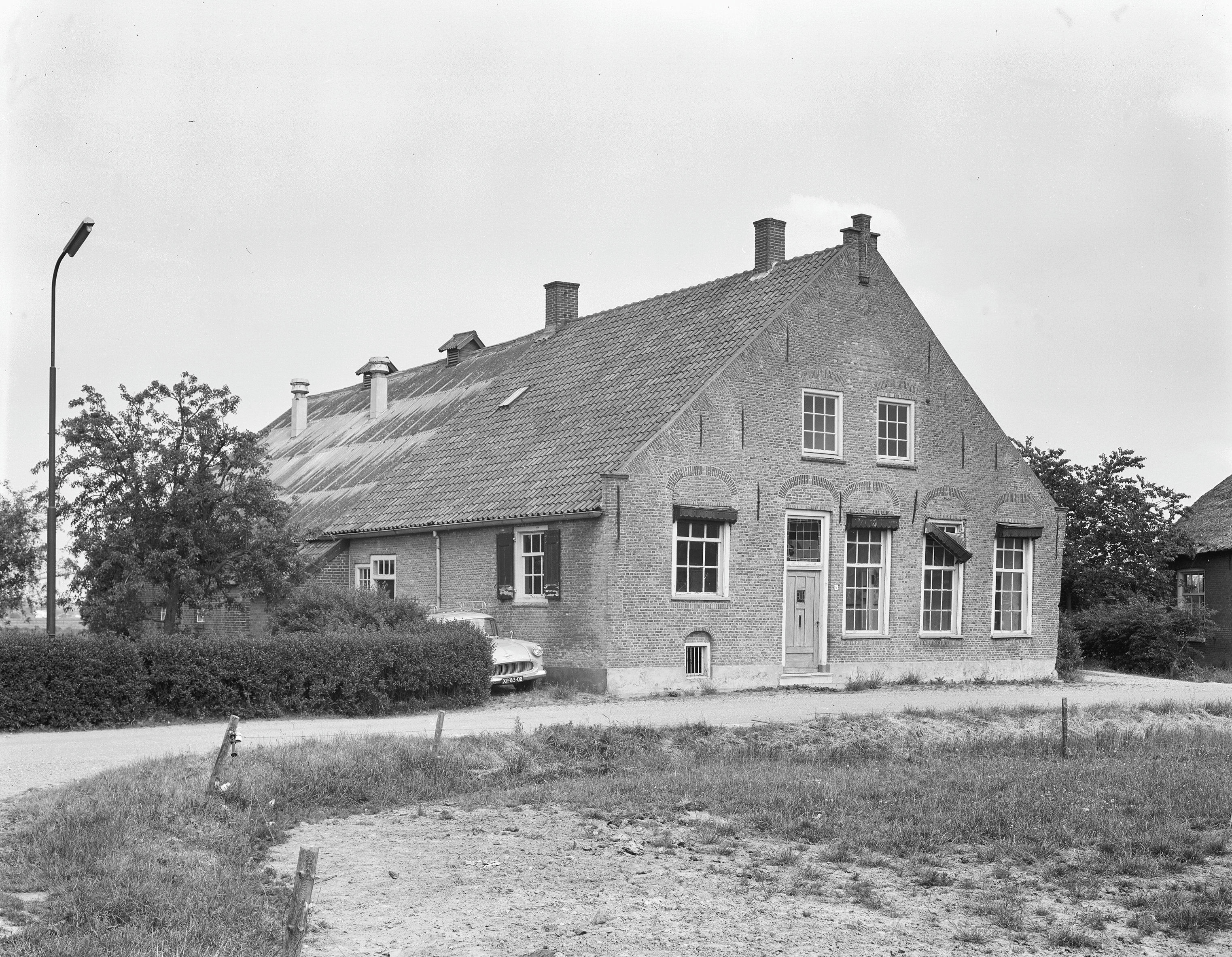
- Farm in Oudheusden (1966)

- Coat of arms

- Location in the province of North Brabant in the Netherlands Oudheusden (Netherlands)
- Coordinates: 51°43′23″N 5°8′10″E
- Country: Netherlands
- Province: North Brabant
- Municipality: Heusden

Area
  - Total: 5.76 km^{2} (2.22 sq mi)

Population (2021)
  - Total: 2,735
  - Density: 475/km^{2} (1,230/sq mi)
- Time zone: UTC+1 (CET)
  - Summer (DST): UTC+2 (CEST)
- Postal code: 5156
- Dialing code: 0416

Oudheusden is a village in the Dutch province of North Brabant. It is in the municipality of Heusden, about 1 km (0.62 mi) south of the city of Heusden.

The name Oudheusden literally means "Old-Heusden", from the Dutch word "oud" (English: old) and is used to distinguish it from Heusden. Oudheusden was first mentioned between 1108 and 1121 as Hysdene.

Oudheusden was home to 858 people in 1840. Oudheusden was a separate municipality until 1935, when it became part of Heusden. After World War II, Heusden wanted to expand and demolish its fortification, however the Dutch Monument organisation prevented their demise. It has resulted in an extension of the city into the village.
