= Heusden =

- Municipality
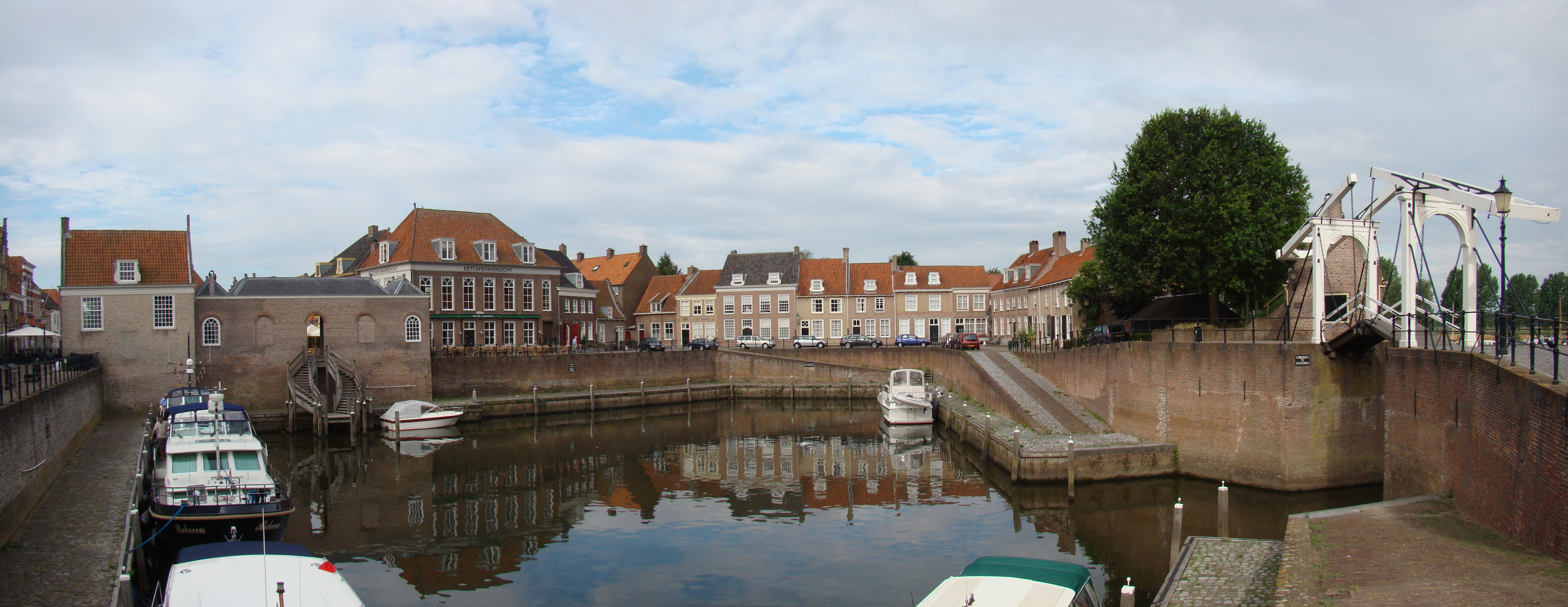
- Old harbour in Heusden

- Flag Coat of arms

- Location in North Brabant
- Coordinates: 51°41′N 5°8′E
- Country: Netherlands
- Province: North Brabant

Government
  - Body: Municipal council
  - Mayor: Willemijn van Hees (VVD)

Area
  - Total: 81.22 km^{2} (31.36 sq mi)
  - Land: 78.88 km^{2} (30.46 sq mi)
  - Water: 2.34 km^{2} (0.90 sq mi)
- Elevation: 4 m (13 ft)

Population (January 2021)
  - Total: 45,005
  - Density: 571/km^{2} (1,480/sq mi)
- Time zone: UTC+1 (CET)
  - Summer (DST): UTC+2 (CEST)
- Postcode: 5150–5154, 5250–5256
- Area code: 0416, 073
- Website: www.heusden.nl

Heusden (Dutch pronunciation: [ˈɦøːzdə(n)]) is a municipality and a city in the south of the Netherlands. It is located between the towns of Waalwijk and 's-Hertogenbosch. The municipality of Heusden, including Herpt, Heesbeen, Hedikhuizen, Doeveren, and Oudheusden, merged with Drunen and Vlijmen in 1997, giving the municipality its current form.

The middle part of national park the Loonse en Drunense Duinen is located in the municipality of Heusden.

== Population centres ==
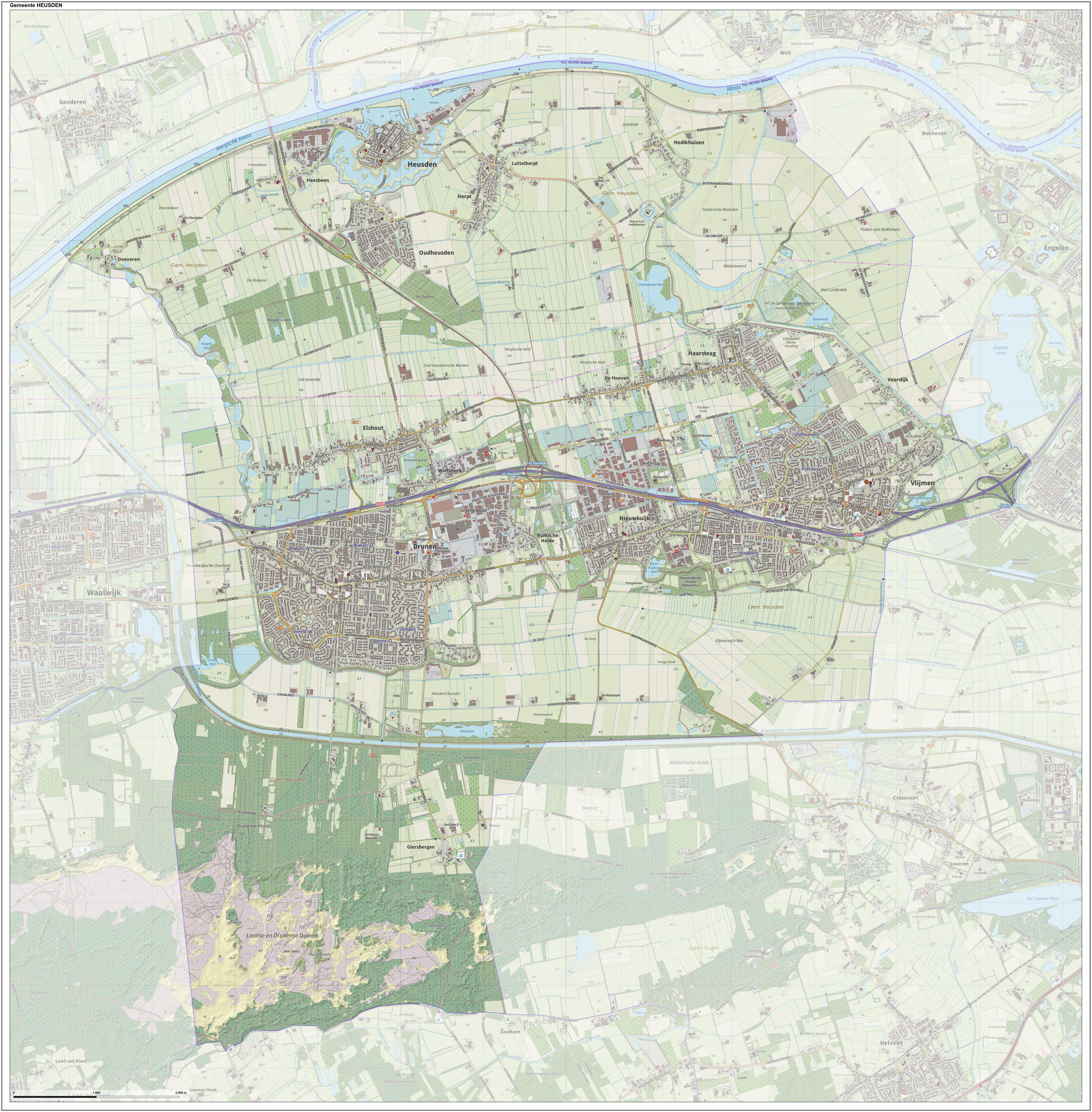
Dutch Topographic map of Heusden, June 2015

- Doeveren
- Drunen
- Elshout
- Giersbergen
- Haarsteeg
- Hedikhuizen
- Heesbeen
- Herpt
- Heusden
- Nieuwkuijk
- Oudheusden
- Vlijmen

== Heusden town ==
Before 1997, Heusden was a municipality in itself, that included the communities of Herpt, Heesbeen, Hedikhuizen, Doeveren, and Oudheusden.

=== Castle ===
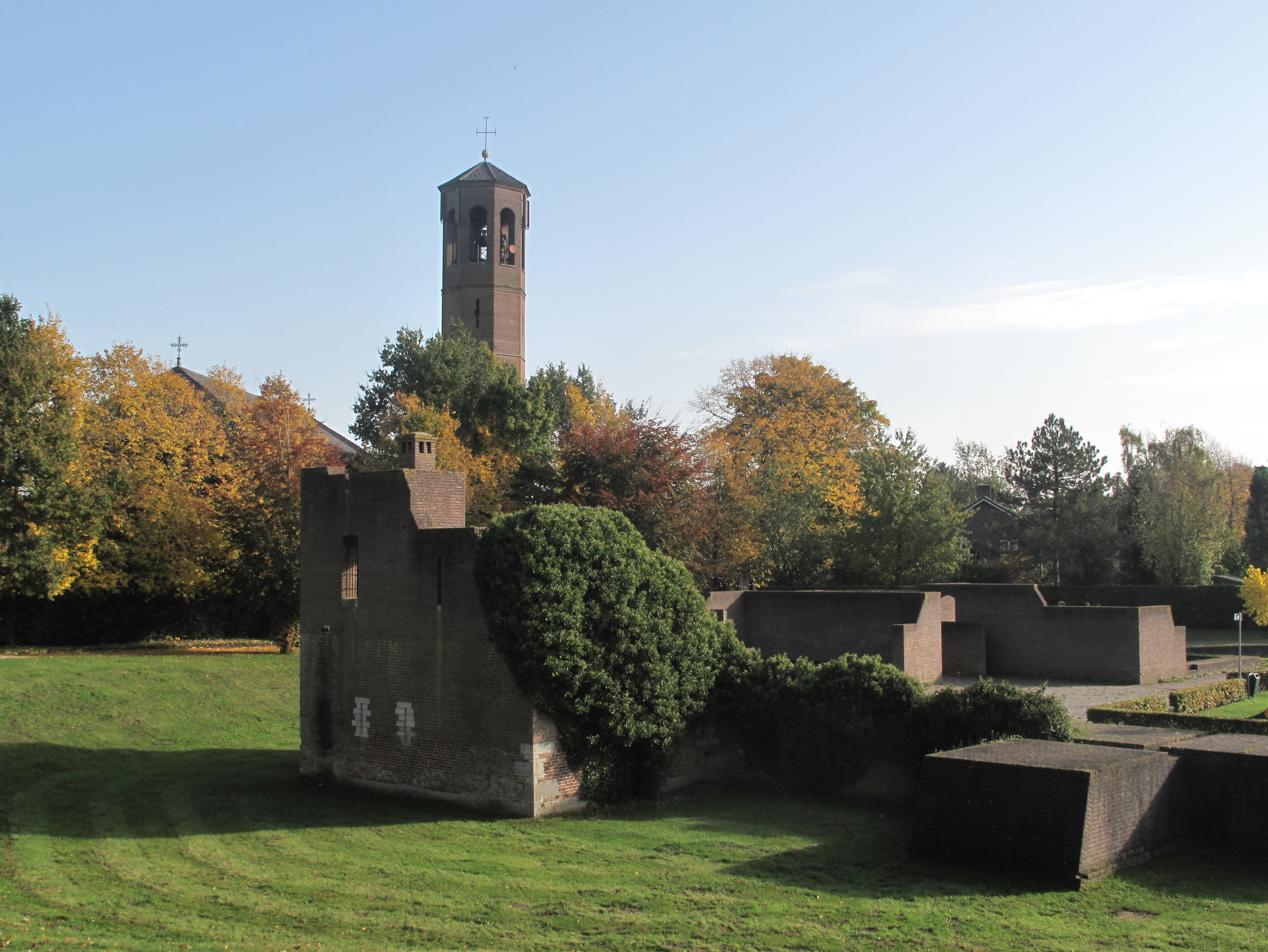
Remnants of Castle Heusden

The settlement of Heusden on the river Maas (Meuse) started with the construction of Heusden Castle, which replaced an earlier castle destroyed by Henry I, Duke of Brabant in 1202. This fortification was quickly expanded with water works and a donjon (castle keep). The city of Heusden received city rights in 1318. Heusden's castle had belonged to successive dukes of Brabant; in 1357 it passed into the hands of the counts of Holland. Ramparts and moats were constructed, bringing the castle within the city's fortifications and resulting in the loss of its function as a stronghold. The donjon was then used as a munition depot. On 24 July 1680, a terrible thunderstorm hit Heusden, and lightning struck the donjon. Sixty thousand pounds of gunpowder and other ammunition exploded, destroying the castle. It took seven weeks to clear the rubble and debris. The castle was never fully rebuilt. However, outlines of the main features were restored in 1987.

=== Fortifications and restoration ===
Map of Heusden (c. 1710)

At the beginning of the Eighty Years' War (1568–1648), Heusden was occupied by the Spanish. In 1577, however, following the Pacification of Ghent, the people of Heusden allied with William, Prince of Orange. William consolidated the town's strategic position near the river Meuse, and ordered fortification works to be constructed. Work started in 1579 with the digging of moats and the construction of bastions, walls, and ravelins, and was completed in 1597.

By the early nineteenth century, the defence works fell into disrepair and were dismantled. In 1968, however, extensive restoration works started, and fortifications were carefully rebuilt, based on and inspired by a 1649 map of the city of Heusden by Johannes Blaeu, son of the famous Dutch cartographer Willem Blaeu. In 1980, the city of Heusden received the European Urbes Nostrae restoration prize. Heusden currently draws over 350 thousand tourists every year who visit the historic town centre and walk the walls that once made it a formidable stronghold.

=== Heusden Town Hall Massacre ===
Memorial tablet, Heusden town hall.

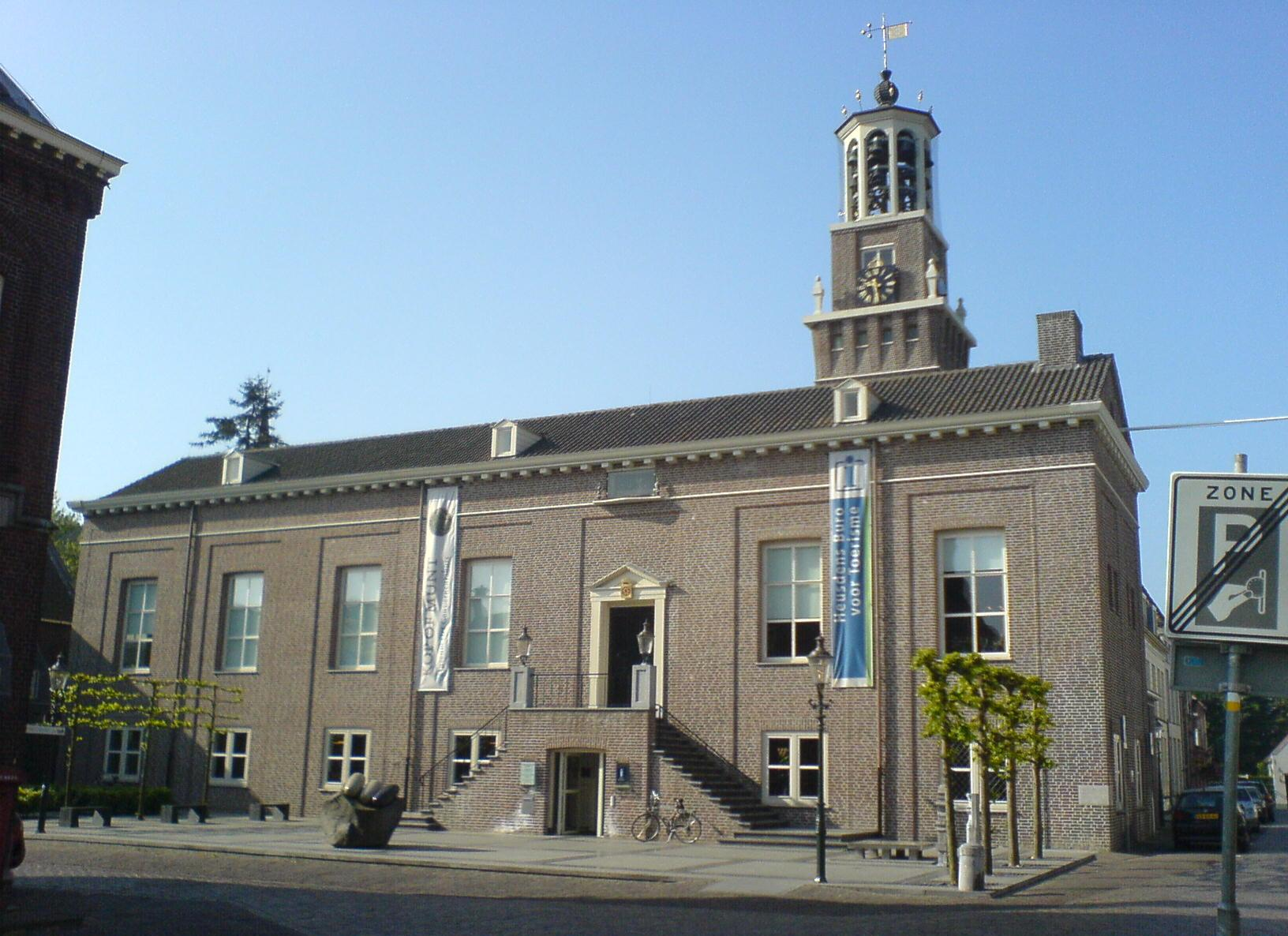
Heusden town hall (Summer 2007).

In October 1944, towards the end of World War II, the cities of Tilburg and 's-Hertogenbosch (Den Bosch) were liberated by the Allied forces. The bridge across the river Meuse made Heusden, then still occupied by the Germans, strategically significant. The cellars of the old town hall, built in 1588, were a shelter for civilians during artillery fire. The German Wehrmacht used the building as a communication centre and hospital.

A few weeks after Operation Market Garden, the allied Operation Pheasant started on 20 October 1944. The First Canadian Army (advancing from Belgium) and the 2nd British Army (advancing from the east) fought to liberate central and western North Brabant. On Saturday 4 November, under heavy artillery fire, two Scottish Highlander regiments advanced, and 170 civilians sought shelter in the town hall cellars. In the early morning of 5 November, three German army engineers detonated explosive charges they had placed earlier in the 40-metre tower. It collapsed, killing 134 people. Heusden was decimated. One tenth of the town's population died that night in the town hall cellars. Seventy-four victims, i.e. more than half of the total number, were children aged 16 or younger. Only hours later, the 5th battalion of the Queen's Own Cameron Highlanders from the 51st Highland Division liberated Heusden.

Witnesses have stated that on 4 November German soldiers carried explosives into the town hall tower, and also into two churches, a windmill, and dairy factory in Heusden. NCO (non-commissioned officer) Bottnick, who was probably following orders from commander Pfühl, a mining engineer, undermined the eastern part of the tower, ensuring that it would collapse on the town hall, not on the street. Later, these events were investigated by the British Civil Affairs. However, this has never resulted in the trial and punishment of Pfühl, Bottnick, and their accomplices.

A new town hall was erected in 1956. Designed and built in the style of the Bossche School, it has much less splendour than its late-gothic predecessor. A memorial tablet in the forecourt still remembers the lives that were lost in the night of 4 to 5 November 1944. Its inscription: "Wandelaar, waar gij staat vielen vijf november 1944 honderd vier en dertig burgers den oorlog ten offer." ("Passer-by, where you are, on five November 1944 one hundred and thirty four civilians fell victim to the war.")

Inscriptions on one of the larger bells in the tower "Nabestaanden, als ik luid, weet: Uw vele, vele doden zijn niet oorlogs droeve buit, maar aan 't Gastmaal Gods genoden." ("Relatives, when I ring, know: Your many, many decedents are not the sad spoils of war, but the guests of God's banquet."), and an epitaph "5 November 1944. Hier staat in steen geschreven geen daad of droom, geen leven, maar slechts het blijvend feit van hun afwezigheid" ("5 November 1944. Here is written in stone no act or dream, no life, but only the permanent fact of their absence") in the building itself are also dedicated to the memory of the victims.

The massacre ("Stadhuisramp") is commemorated every year.

With the fusion of the municipalities of Heusden, Drunen and Vlijmen in 1997, the town hall had lost its original function. Since 2005, the building has housed a visitors centre.

== Notable residents ==
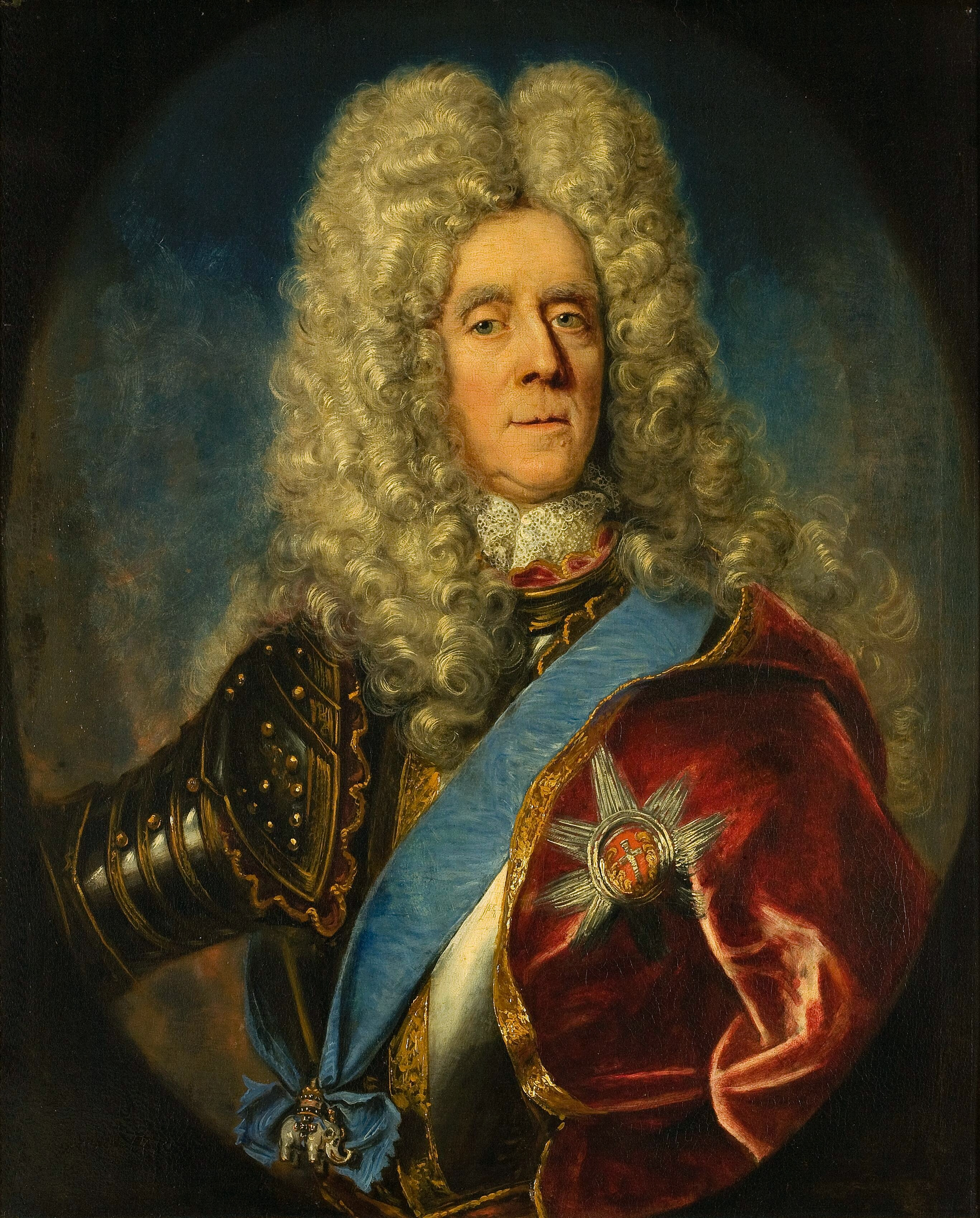
Jacob II van Wassenaer Obdam, ca.1710

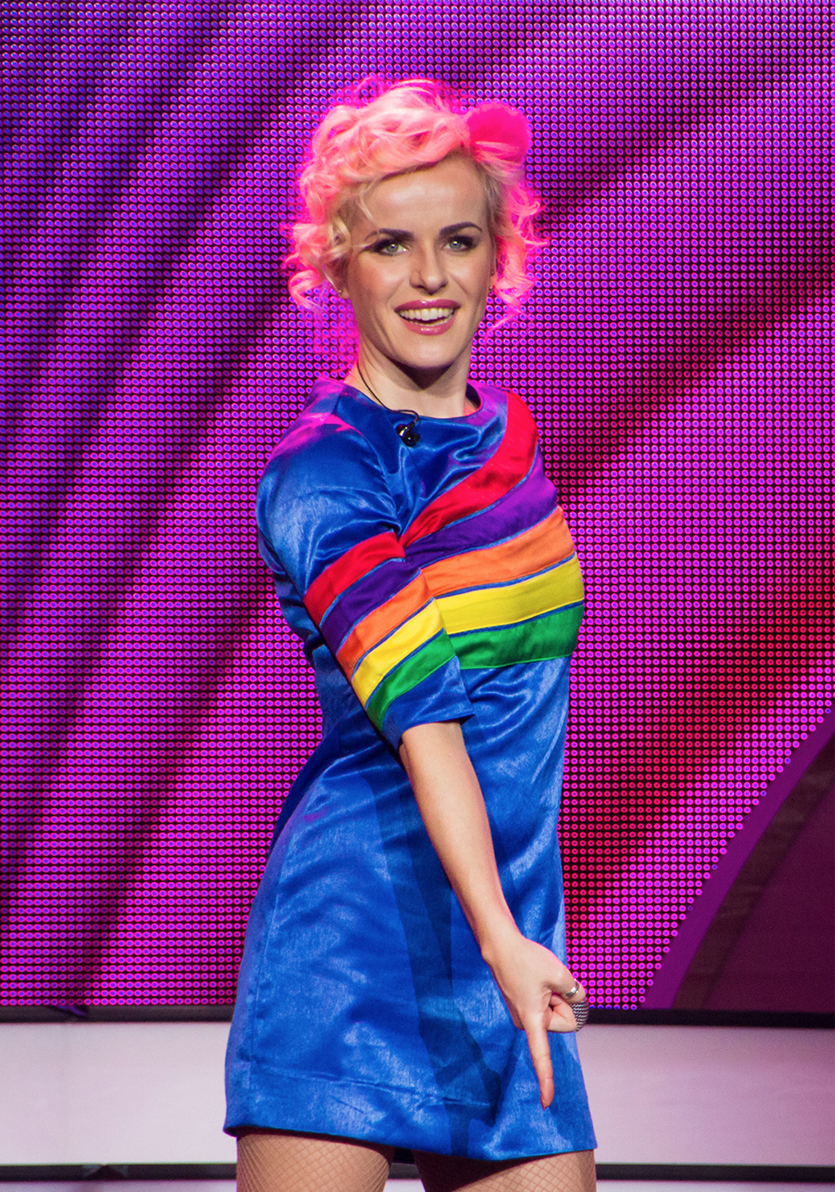
Josje Huisman, 2016

- Gisbertus Voetius (1589 in Heusden – 1676) a Dutch Calvinist theologian
- Jonkheer Jacob van Eyck (ca.1590 in Heusden – 1657) a Dutch nobleman, musician and composer
- Dirck van Delen (c. 1605 in Heusden – 1671) a Dutch painter of palaces and church interiors.
- Dirck Wijntrack (1615 in Heusden – 1678) a Dutch Golden Age painter
- Jacob van Wassenaer Obdam (1645 in Heusden – 1714) a Dutch general in the War of the Spanish Succession
- Philip Lichtenberg (1669 – 1678), Dutch military officer and Governor of Surinam
- Jean Conrad de Kock (1756 in Heusden – 1794) a lawyer, banker and republican. Guillotined in Paris.
- Hendrik Merkus de Kock (1779 in Heusden – 1845) a Dutch general and nobleman in the Batavian Navy and Lieutenant Governor-General of the Dutch East Indies
- Theodore James Ryken (1797 in Heusden – 1871) a Dutch Roman Catholic, founded the Xaverian Brothers
- Lieven Ferdinand de Beaufort (1879 in Den Treek – 1968) a Dutch biologist, museum director and academic
- Martin van Rooijen (born 1942 in Drunen) a Dutch politician
- Josje Huisman (born 1986 in Heusden) a Dutch singer, actress, dancer, host and writer
- Jolijn van de Wiel (born 1992 in Drunen) a Dutch actress

=== Sport ===
- Ton van Engelen (born 1950 in Den Bosch) a retired Dutch football goalkeeper
- Lars Boom (born 1985 in Vlijmen) a professional cyclo-cross and road racing cyclist
- Jesse Timmermans (born 1989 in Vlijmen) a Dutch tennis player.

== Image gallery ==
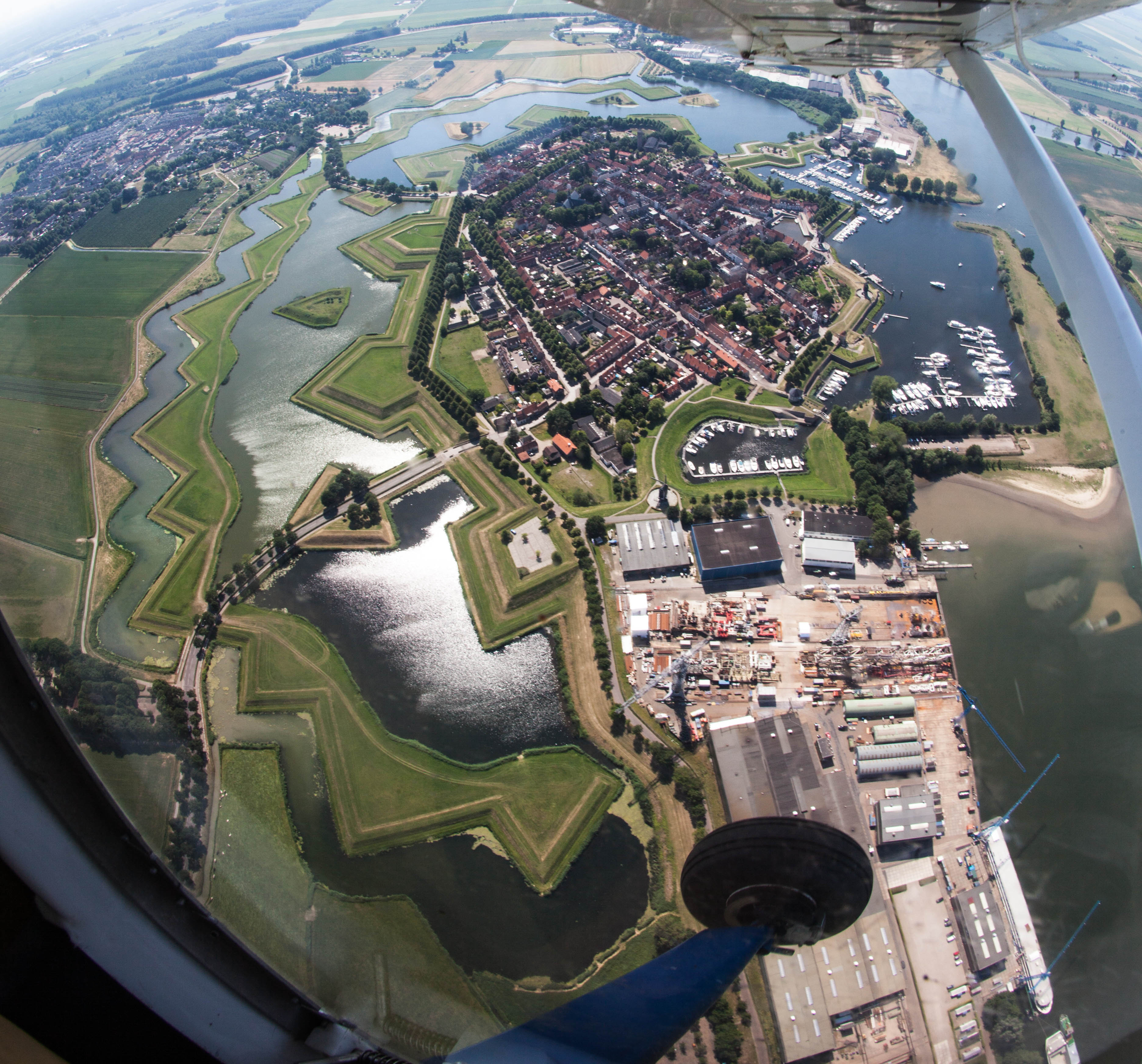
Aerial photograph of the fortifications

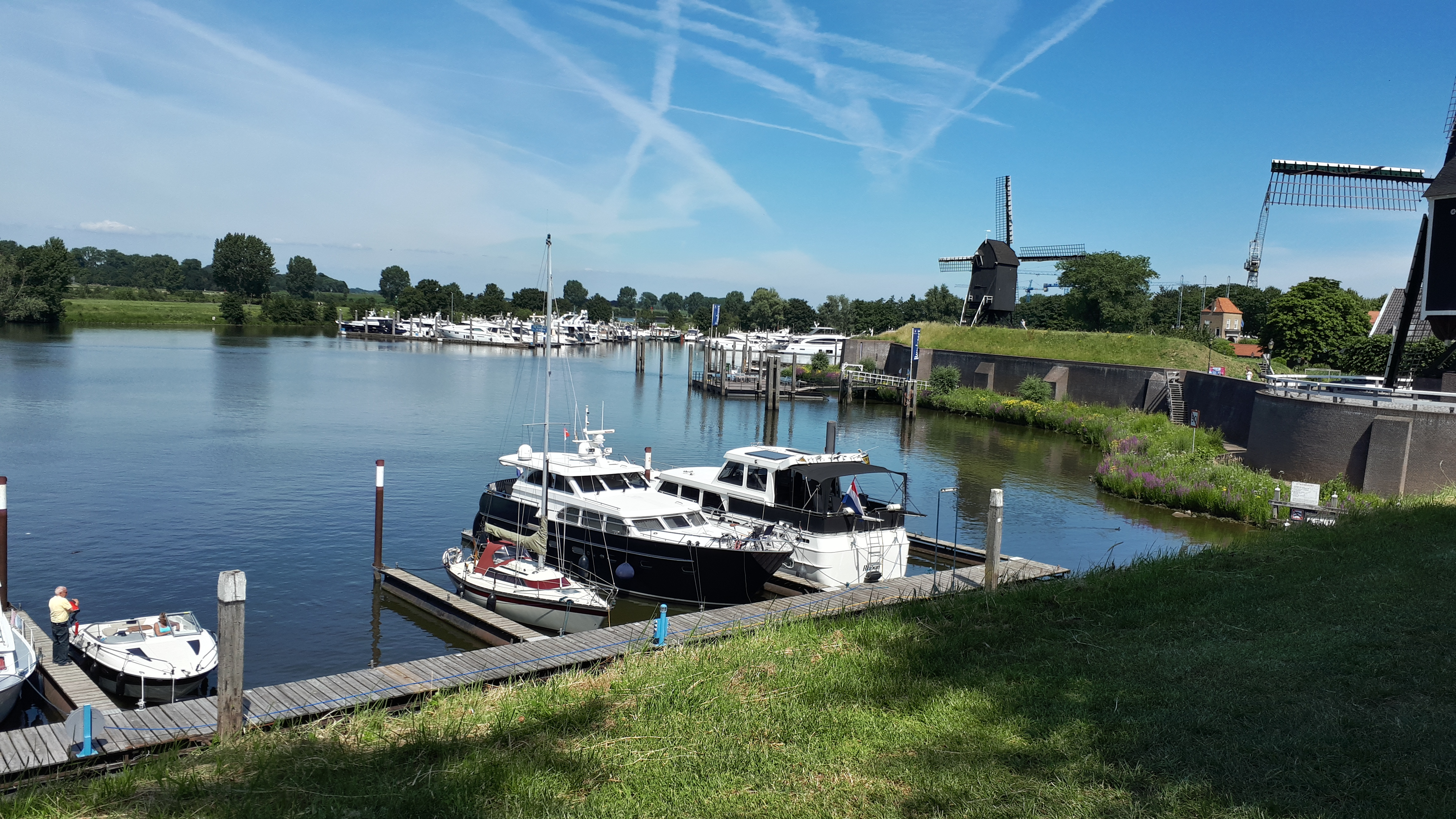
Rijksvluchthaven, Yacht harbour in Heusden

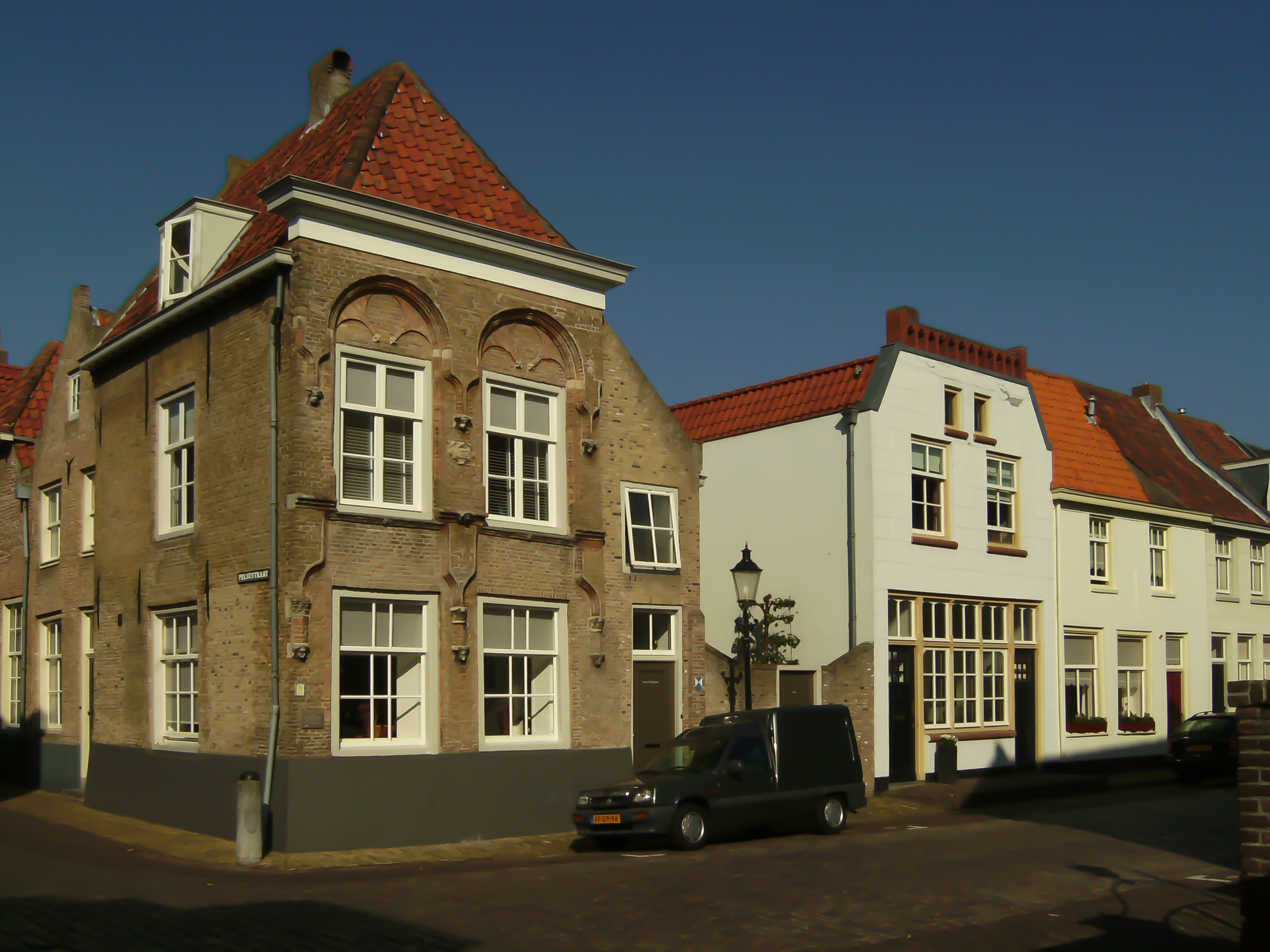
Heusden, living-houses in fortress

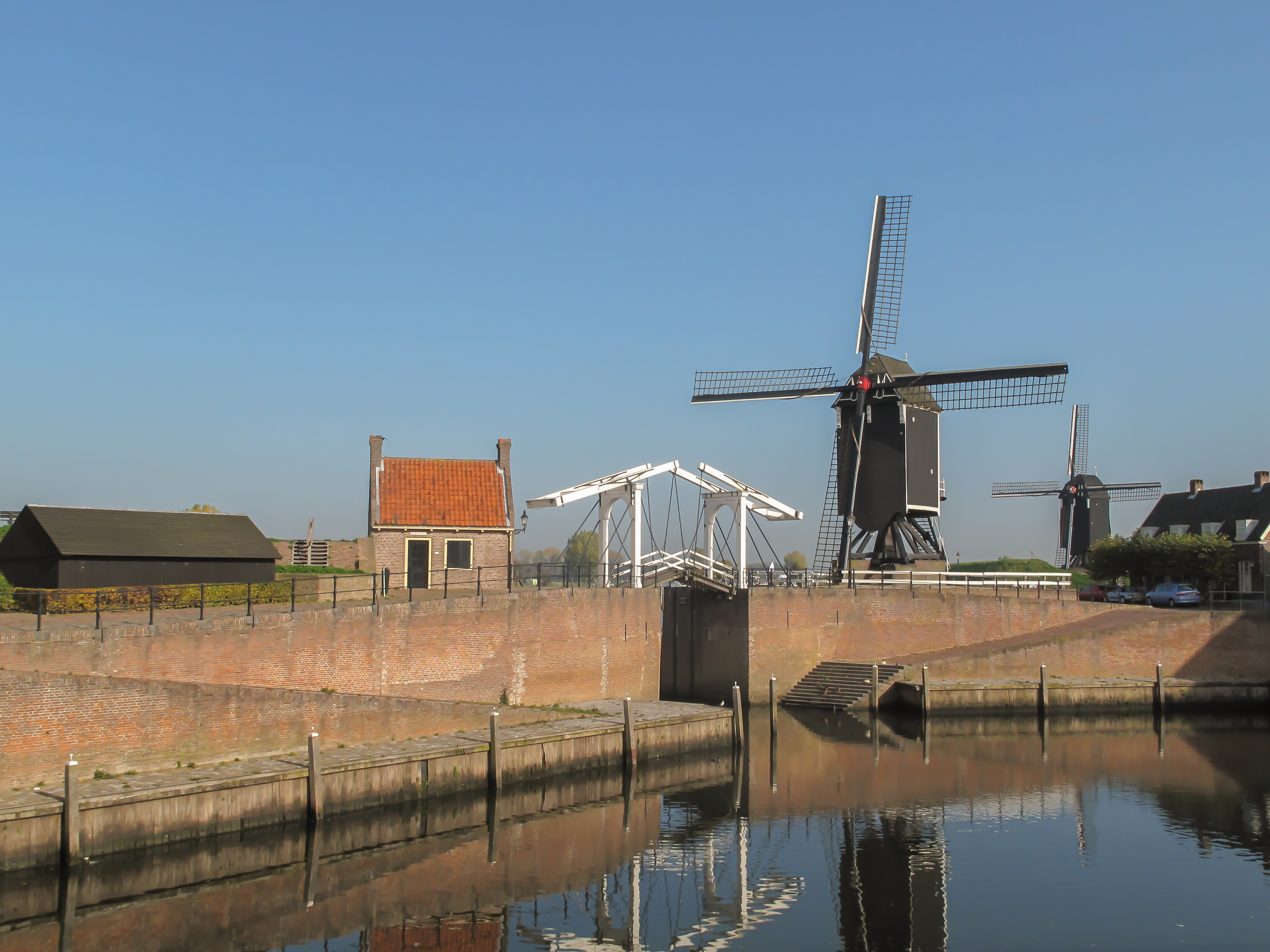
Heusden, windmills and drawing bridge

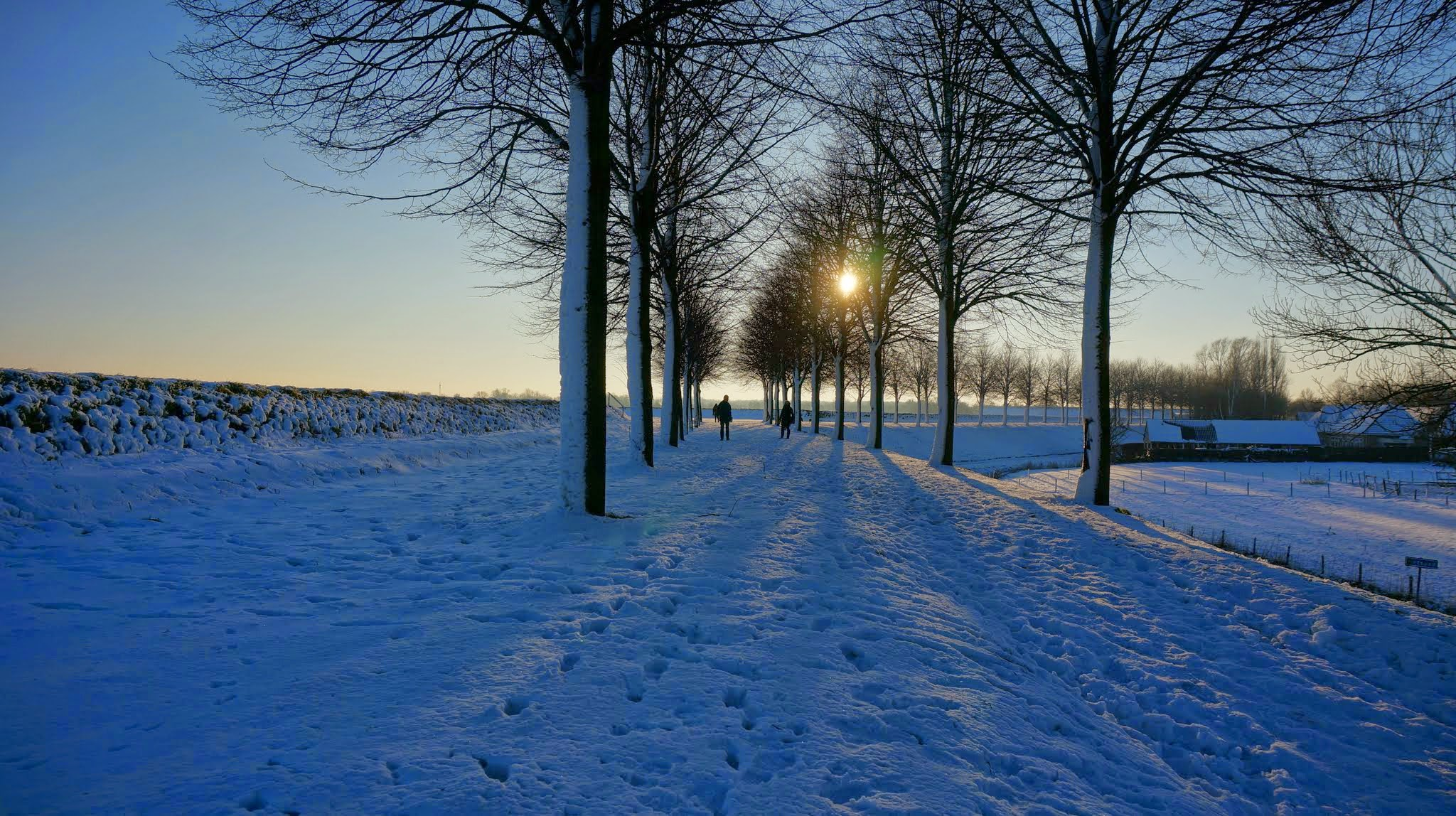
Heusden, Netherlands - panoramio
