= Viscount =

Aristocratic title in various European countries

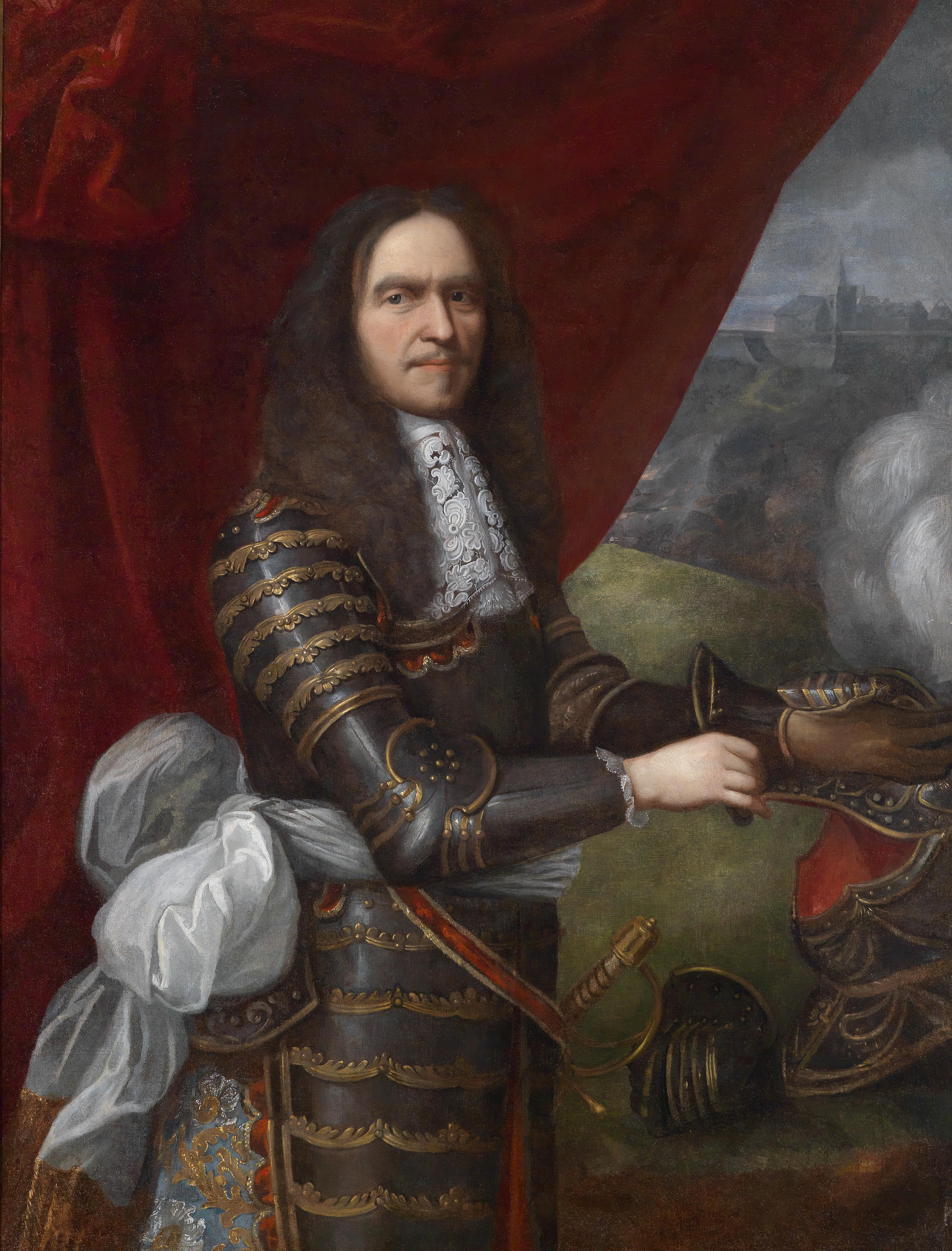
The French general Henri de La Tour d'Auvergne, Viscount of Turenne

A viscount (/ˈvaɪkaʊnt/ VY-kownt, for male) or viscountess (/ˈvaɪkaʊntɪs/, for female) is a title used in certain European countries for a noble of varying status. The status and any domain held by a viscount is a viscounty or viscountcy.

In the case of French viscounts, the title is sometimes left untranslated as vicomte [vi.kɔ̃t].

== Etymology ==
The word viscount comes from Old French visconte (Modern French: vicomte), itself from Medieval Latin vicecomitem, accusative of vicecomes, from Late Latin vice- "deputy" + Latin comes (originally "companion"; later Roman imperial courtier or trusted appointee, ultimately count).

== History ==
During the Carolingian Empire, the kings appointed counts to administer provinces and other smaller regions, as governors and military commanders. Viscounts were appointed to assist the counts in their running of the province, and often took on judicial responsibility. The kings strictly prevented the offices of their counts and viscounts from becoming hereditary, in order to consolidate their position and limit chance of rebellion.

The title was in use in Normandy by at least the early 11th century. Similar to the Carolingian use of the title, the Norman viscounts were local administrators, working on behalf of the duke. Their role was to administer justice and to collect taxes and revenues, often being castellan of the local castle. Under the Normans, the position developed into a hereditary one, an example of such being the viscounts in Bessin. The viscount was eventually replaced by bailiffs, and provosts.

As a rank of the British peerage, it was first recorded in 1440, when John Beaumont was created Viscount Beaumont by King Henry VI. The word viscount corresponds in the UK to the Anglo-Saxon shire reeve (root of the non-nobiliary, royal-appointed office of sheriff). Thus, early viscounts originally received their titles from the monarch, and not hereditarily; they eventually tended to establish hereditary principalities in the wider sense. The rank is a relatively late introduction to the British system, and on the evening of her coronation in 1838, Queen Victoria recorded in her diary an explanation for this by then-Prime Minister Lord Melbourne (himself a viscount):

I spoke to Ld M. about the numbers of Peers present at the Coronation, & he said it was quite unprecedented. I observed that there were very few Viscounts, to which he replied "There are very few Viscounts," that they were an old sort of title & not really English; that they came from Vice-Comites; that Dukes & Barons were the only real English titles;—that Marquises were likewise not English, & that people were mere made Marquises, when it was not wished that they should be made Dukes.

== Early modern and contemporary usage ==
=== Belgium ===
In Belgium a few families are recognised as Viscounts:

- Viscount of Audenaerde
- Viscount of Hombeke
- Viscount de Spoelberch
- Viscount Eyskens
- Viscount Savoir
- Viscount Poullet
- Viscount Frimout
- Viscount De Winne

=== United Kingdom ===
Viscounts are the fourth rank in the British peerage, standing directly below an earl and above a baron (Lord of Parliament in Scotland). There are approximately 270 viscountcies extant in the peerages of the British Isles, though most are secondary titles.

In British practice, the title of a viscount may be a place name, a surname, or a combination: examples include Viscount Falmouth, Viscount Hardinge and Viscount Colville of Culross. Some viscounts in the peerage of Scotland were traditionally styled "The Viscount of [X]", such as the Viscount of Arbuthnott. In practice, however, very few maintain this style, instead using the more common version "Viscount [X]" in general parlance, for example Viscount of Falkland who is referred to as Viscount Falkland.

A British viscount is addressed in speech as Lord [X], while his wife is Lady [X], and he is formally styled "The Right Honourable The Viscount [X]". The children of a viscount are known as The Honourable [Forename] [Surname], with the exception of a Scottish viscount, whose eldest child may be styled as "The Honourable Master of [X]".

==== Ireland ====
The title of viscount (Irish: bíocunta) was introduced to the Peerage of Ireland in 1478 with the creation of the title of Viscount Gormanston, the premier viscountcy of Britain and Ireland, held today by Nicholas Preston, 17th Viscount Gormanston. Other early Irish viscountcies were Viscount Baltinglass (1541), Viscount Clontarf (1541), Viscount Mountgarret (1550) and Viscount Decies (1569).

==== Use as a courtesy title ====
A specifically British custom is the use of viscount as a courtesy title for the heir of an earl or marquess. The peer's heir apparent will sometimes be referred to as a viscount, if the second most senior title held by the head of the family is a viscountcy. For example, the eldest son of the Earl Howe is Viscount Curzon, because this is the second most senior title held by the Earl.

However, the son of a marquess or an earl can be referred to as a viscount when the title of viscount is not the second most senior if those above it share their name with the substantive title. For example, the second most senior title of the marquess of Salisbury is the earl of Salisbury, so his heir uses the lower title of Viscount Cranborne.

Sometimes, the son of a peer is referred to as a viscount even when he could use a more senior courtesy title which differs in name from the substantive title. Family tradition plays a role in this. For example, the eldest son of the marquess of Londonderry is Viscount Castlereagh, even though the marquess is also the Earl Vane.

On occasion, the title of viscount may be the courtesy title used for the grandson of a duke, provided that he is the eldest son of the duke's eldest son. This is because the eldest son of the duke will be given the second-highest title of his father (marquess or earl), and so the third-highest is left for his eldest son. It is possible for the great-grandson of a duke to hold the courtesy title of viscount if the duke's eldest son has the courtesy title marquess and his eldest son, in turn, uses the title of earl.

==== Coronet ====
Coronet of a British viscount.

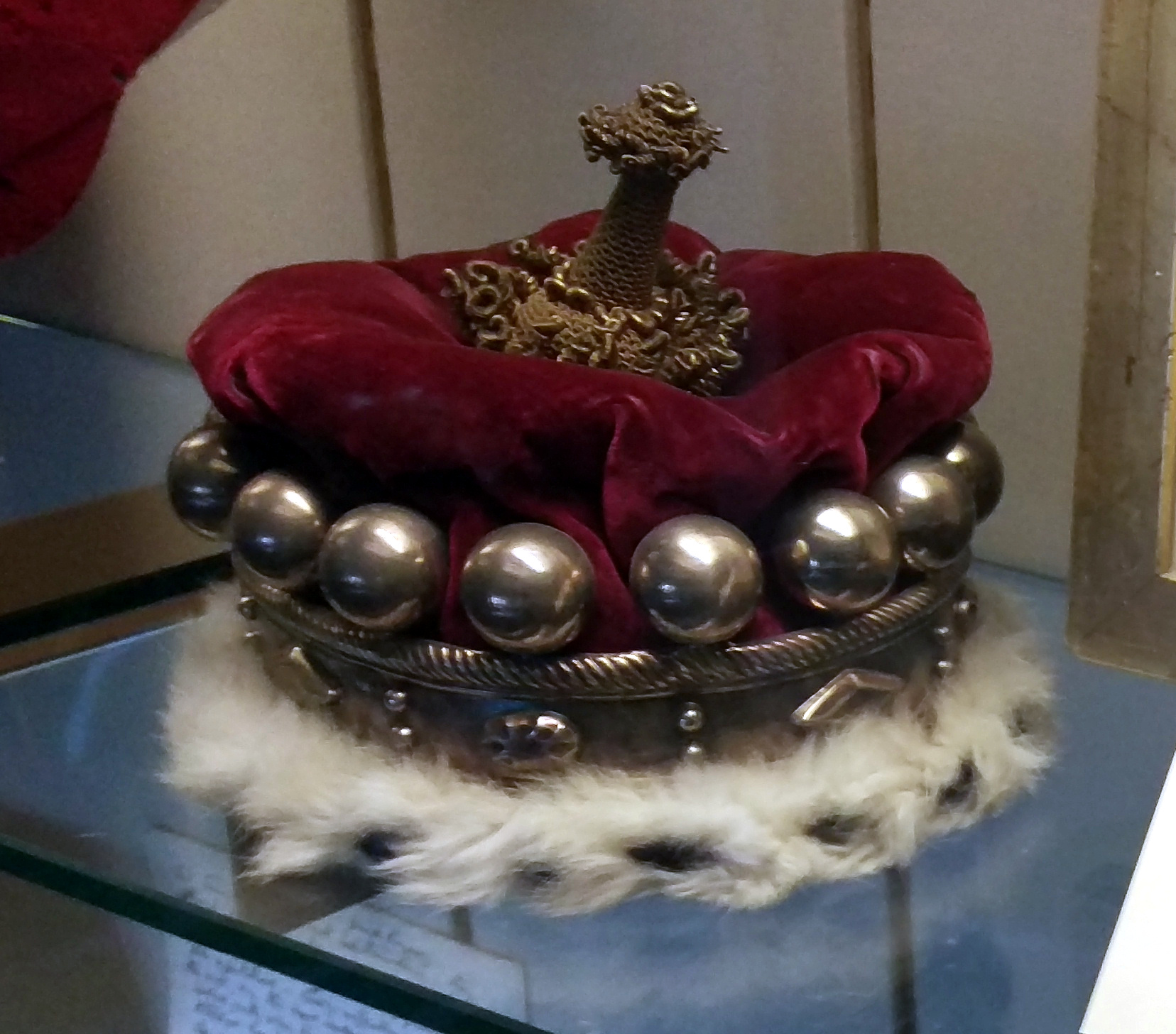
Coronet of the 6th Viscount Clifden.

A viscount's coronet of rank bears 16 silver balls around the rim. Like all heraldic coronets, it is mostly worn at the coronation of the British monarch, but a viscount has the right to bear his coronet of rank on his coat of arms, above the shield. In this guise, the coronet is shown face-on, featuring 9 silver balls.

=== Jersey ===
The island of Jersey (a British Crown Dependency) still retains an officer whose function is purely to administer orders of the island's judiciary, and whose position remains non-hereditary. The role of the Viscount of Jersey (French: Vicomte de Jersey) involves managing fines, bail monies, seizures, confiscations, evictions, service of process, arrests for non-appearance in court and other enforcement procedures, as well acting as coroner for sudden or unexpected deaths and managing jury selection.

=== France ===
In France until the end of the Second French Empire, the title of vicomte was below comte and above baron in precedence.

=== Portugal ===
In the former kingdom of Portugal a visconde ranks above a barão (baron) and below a conde (count). The first Portuguese viscountcy, that of D. Leonel de Lima, visconde de Vila Nova de Cerveira, dates from the reign of Afonso V. A flood of viscountcies, some 86 new titles, were awarded in Portugal between 1848 and 1880.

=== Spain ===
The Spanish title of vizconde is ranked between the title conde (count/earl) and the relatively rare title of barón.

In Spain, nobles are classified as either Grandee of Spain (Grandes de España), as titled nobles, or as untitled nobles. A grandee of any rank outranks a non-grandee, even if that non-grandee's title is of a higher degree, thus, a viscount-grandee enjoys higher precedence than a marquis who is not a grandee.

In the kingdom of Spain the title was awarded from the reign of Felipe IV (1621–65; Habsburg dynasty) until 1846.

== Equivalent titles ==
=== Western counterparts ===
There are non-etymological equivalents to the title of viscount (i.e., 'vice-count') in several languages, including German.

However, in such case titles of the etymological Burgrave family (not in countries with a viscount-form, such as Italian burgravio alongside visconte) bearers of the title could establish themselves at the same gap, thus at generally the same level. Consequently, a Freiherr (or Baron) ranks not immediately below a Graf, but below a Burggraf.

Thus in Dutch, Burggraaf is the rank above Baron, below Graaf (i.e., Count) in the kingdoms of the Netherlands and of Belgium (by Belgian law, its equivalents in the other official languages are Burggraf in German and vicomte in French).

=== Non-Western counterparts ===
Like other major Western noble titles, viscount is sometimes used to render certain titles in non-western languages with their own traditions. Even though they are considered 'equivalent' in relative rank, they are as a rule historically unrelated and thus hard to compare.

The Japanese cognate shishaku (shi) (Japanese: 子爵) was the fourth of the five peerage ranks established in the Meiji period (1868–1911). The Japanese system of nobility, kazoku, which existed between 1884 and 1947, was based heavily on the British peerage. At the creation of the system, viscounts were the most numerous of all the ranks, with 324 being created compared to 11 non-imperial princes or dukes, 24 marquesses, 76 counts and 74 barons, for a total of 509 peers.

Other equivalent titles existed, such as:

- the Chinese tzu-chueh (tzu) or zijue (zi) (Chinese: 子爵), hereditary title of nobility first established in the Zhou dynasty
- the Korean cognate jajak (Korean: 子爵) or pansŏ (判書)
- the Vietnamese cognate tử (子)
- the Manchu jingkini hafan

== In fiction ==
Viscounts and viscountesses appear in fiction, notably in Julia Quinn's Bridgerton series where Anthony, Viscount Bridgerton is the eldest son and head of the eponymous family. He is also the focus of the second novel of the series, the #1 The New York Times Bestseller The Viscount Who Loved Me, published in 2000. The viscount is portrayed by Jonathan Bailey in the Netflix television adaptation Bridgerton released in 2020.

Another prominent fictional viscount is Raoul, Vicomte de Chagny, one of the love interests in Gaston Leroux's classic novel Le Fantôme de l'Opéra, first published in 1910. He is a notable viscount in France and a patron of the Opera Populaire, the fictional opera house based on the real Palais Garnier. When Raoul marries Christine Daaé she becomes the Vicomtesse de Chagny.

== See also ==
- Lists of viscountcies
  - List of viscountcies in the peerages of Britain and Ireland
  - List of viscountcies in Portugal
- Several Italian noble dynasties
  - Visconti of Milan, ruled Milan from 1277 to 1447
    - Visconti di Modrone, collateral branch of the Visconti of Milan
  - Visconti of Pisa and Sardinia, ruled Gallura in Sardinia from 1207 to 1250

== Sources ==
- Engels, O. (1997). "Vicecomes II. Katalonien". Lexikon des Mittelalters, VIII: Stadt (Byzantinisches Reich) bis Werl (in German). Stuttgart and Weimar: J. B. Metzler. col. 1619. ISBN 3-89659-908-9.
- Houben, H. (1997). "Vicecomes IV. Italien". Lexikon des Mittelalters, VIII: Stadt (Byzantinisches Reich) bis Werl (in German). Stuttgart and Weimar: J. B. Metzler. col. 1619. ISBN 3-89659-908-9.
- Huschner, W. (1997). "Vicecomes I. Karolingerzeit". Lexikon des Mittelalters, VIII: Stadt (Byzantinisches Reich) bis Werl (in German). Stuttgart and Weimar: J. B. Metzler. col. 1618–1619. ISBN 3-89659-908-9.
- Mattejiet, U. (1997). "Vicecomes II. Süd- und Südwestfrankreich". Lexikon des Mittelalters, VIII: Stadt (Byzantinisches Reich) bis Werl (in German). Stuttgart and Weimar: J. B. Metzler. col. 1619–1620. ISBN 3-89659-908-9.
- Renoux, A. (1997). "Vicecomes III. Normandie". Lexikon des Mittelalters, VIII: Stadt (Byzantinisches Reich) bis Werl (in German). Stuttgart and Weimar: J. B. Metzler. col. 1620–1621. ISBN 3-89659-908-9.
