= Dynevor =

Dynevor may refer to:

== Places ==
- Dynevor, Queensland, a locality in south-west Queensland, Australia
- Dynevor School, Swansea, a former secondary school in Wales
- Dynevor Castle, officially Dinefwr Castle, a castle in Wales

== People ==
- Leo Dynevor (born 1974), Rugby league footballer
- Phoebe Dynevor (born 1995), English actress
- Sally Dynevor (born 1963), English soap opera actress
- Shirley Dynevor (1933–2023), Welsh actress

== Other ==
Baron Dynevor (officially; Baron Dinevor), Barony in the Peerage of Great Britain
