= Romancing Mister Bridgerton =

2002 novel by Julia Quinn

- Author: Julia Quinn
- Language: English
- Series: Bridgerton series
- Genre: Fiction, Romance, Historical fiction
- Publisher: Avon
- Publication date: July 1, 2002
- Publication place: United States
- Media type: Mass market paperback
- Pages: 370
- ISBN: 0380820846
- Preceded by: An Offer from a Gentleman
- Followed by: To Sir Phillip, With Love

Romancing Mister Bridgerton is a 2002 historical romance novel written by Julia Quinn and published by Avon. It is the fourth novel of Quinn's series of Regency romances about the Bridgerton siblings and tells the story of Colin, the third eldest child of the family.

The novel has been a New York Times, Apple Books, USA Today, and Publishers Weekly bestseller, both at the time of publishing and after the debut of the TV adaptation nearly twenty years later. It has been adapted as the third season of Netflix's Bridgerton series, one of the platform's most popular shows of all time. After the show began airing, book retailers often sold out of the series and hardcover copies of the original books began re-selling at prices as high as $700.

== Plot ==
The novel takes place in 1824, during the Regency era in London, but includes some flashbacks such as in the prologue. In 1812, an almost 16-year-old Penelope Featherington accidentally caused Colin Bridgerton to fall off his horse into a mud puddle. He laughed it off and she became enamored with him.

In 1813, Penelope made her debut and Lady Whistledown's Society Papers, a thrice-weekly, single-sheet newspaper of society gossip, began to be published by the pseudonym Lady Whistledown. Penelope spent time with Eloise Bridgerton and so occasionally encountered Colin, believing her feelings for him will always be unrequited.

In 1817, Penelope overheard Colin telling his elder brothers that he is "certainly not going to marry Penelope Featherington!" They realized she was there but she played it off with dignity.

Now, in 1824, Penelope is considered a spinster at the age of 28, with her unpleasant mother Portia repeatedly implying that they will live together into their old age. Colin Bridgerton has returned from his frequent travels and Portia wonders if Felicity, the youngest Featherington sister, could marry him. Meanwhile, Colin privately reflects that he travels so much because he is restless and without purpose.

At Violet Bridgerton's birthday party a week later, Colin surprises Penelope as she eats an éclair. While they talk, the cream from the half-eaten éclair falls to the floor. Colin dares Penelope to hide the remaining pastry in a nearby potted plant, which she does. The prickly dowager Lady Danbury talks to the pair and announces a contest to the entire party: whomever can unmask Lady Whistledown will win £1000. The next day, Penelope and the Bridgertons speculate about Lady Whistledown's identity and the strategies one might use to find her.

A few days later, Penelope is waiting in the Bridgerton drawing room, when she sees Colin's travel journal laying open on the table and reads the open pages. Colin catches her and is furious. While gathering his journal, he cuts his hand on a letter opener and Penelope helps him staunch the blood. She apologizes but also reassures him how excellent his writing is. Colin expresses his lack of purpose and complains that Lady Whistledown only refers to him as a charmer and nothing more. Penelope tries to be sympathetic, but challenges him to see that being universally liked is much better than being a spinster. She tells him that, as a well-off man, he can change his life as he wishes.

Later, Colin recalls the only other time he'd unintentionally insulted Penelope: several years earlier, his mother had begun suggesting Penelope as a potential bride, leading him to protest aloud to his brothers, which Penelope overheard. He decides to apologize at the Smythe-Smith musicale. Lady Danbury muses that Penelope could be Lady Whistledown. After the performance, Colin and Penelope apologize to each other. Penelope encourages him to publish his travel journals.

Two days later, Colin visits Penelope to share his suspicion that Eloise is Lady Whistledown. They argue and then share a kiss.

A few days later, Lady Whistledown announces her retirement in her Society Papers. At that evening's ball, Colin arrives intending to apologize to Penelope, when Cressida Twombley (née Cowper) announces that she herself is Lady Whistledown. When Cressida tries to collect the £1000, Lady Danbury does not believe her and demands proof.

The next day, Colin heads to Penelope's home to make his apology, when he witnesses her climbing into a hired hack alone. He has his carriage follow her to St. Bride's church in the East End, where he sees her hide an envelope in a pew. He confronts her, reads it, and learns that Penelope herself is Lady Whistledown, writing one last column to denounce Cressida's lie. They get in his carriage to go back to Mayfair, arguing intensely. In their passion and in such close quarters, they begin to kiss again. When they exit the carriage at Penelope's home, he proposes to her. They go inside so Colin can ask her mother. Lady Featherington instantly misinterprets Colin's presence as an intention to propose to Felicity and misses numerous hints to the contrary.

A few days later, Penelope and Eloise are chatting about the engagement announcement. While Eloise is happy about Penelope's engagement, it has also made her reevaluate her own choice not to marry. She continues to be evasive about who she is writing letters to. After another amorous encounter with Penelope, Colin visits his younger sister Daphne to seek advice about love. During their engagement ball, Lady Whistledown's last column unexpectedly appears, and Colin and Penelope get into an argument about her publishing it. Colin realizes that he's jealous of Penelope finding a purpose, and how much he loves her. He asks her to stay the night, and they become intimate for the first time. They're married a week later.

Cressida has figured out Lady Whistledown's identity and tries to blackmail Penelope, giving her one week to pay £10,000. Penelope lets Colin know, they argue about what to do, and he leaves to set a plan in motion. On their way to Hastings House, the Bridgerton ladies tell Penelope they've been instructed to stick to her like glue. At the ball, Colin makes an announcement about how brilliant Penelope is and reveals that she is Lady Whistledown. Cressida is furious, while those in attendance burst into applause.

In the epilogue, Penelope and Colin receive his newly published travel memoir while she is working on a novel called The Wallflower.

== Reception ==
At the time of its release in 2002, Romancing Mr. Bridgerton spent four weeks on the New York Times bestseller list, peaking at #9. It has also been a Publishers Weekly Bestseller. It was a finalist for the 2003 RITA award, the highest distinction in romance literature. It received a B+ from All About Romance, as well as AAR's awards for Best Couple 2002, Best Heroine 2002, and Top 100 Romances in 2010, 2013, 2017, and 2018.

In 2021, following the premiere of Bridgerton season one on Netflix, Romancing Mr. Bridgerton returned to bestseller lists, spending multiple weeks on both the New York Times, Apple Books, and USA Today lists. Again, following the premiere of season two, several of the Bridgerton books, including Romancing Mister Bridgerton, returned to bestseller lists such as Publishers Weekly. A special edition with unique artwork made for Once Upon a Book Club sold out.

== Adaptation ==
The Bridgerton series on Netflix has been one of the platform's most popular series, watched by more than 82 million accounts. Romancing Mister Bridgerton, the fourth novel in the series, is the basis of the third season of the show, displacing An Offer from a Gentleman. Season three premiered in two parts on May 16 and June 13, 2024. Luke Newton plays Colin Bridgerton, Nicola Coughlan portrays Penelope Featherington, and many of the cast from the two previous seasons renew their roles, with the exceptions of Phoebe Dynevor and Regé-Jean Page.

Romancing Mister Bridgerton received a TV tie-in reprint on May 7, 2024.
