= Karen Hawkins =

Karen Hawkins is the name of

- Karen Hawkins (athlete) (born 1957), American sprinter
- Karen Hawkins (author), American author of historical romance novels
