= Christina Dodd =

American novelist

- Born: July 14, ?
- Occupation: Novelist
- Writing career
- Period: 1991–present
- Genres: Historical Romance, Romantic Suspense, Paranormal
- Notable work: Candle in the Window
- Notable awards: RITA award – Best First Book; 1992 Candle in the Window
- Website: www.christinadodd.com

Christina Dodd (born July 14, ?) is the best-selling American author of suspense and regency historical romance. She is a recipient of the RITA Award.

== Biography ==
Dodd is the youngest of three daughters (her sisters are 8 and 10 years older than she is) whose father died before she was born. Although her mother had been a housewife with few job skills, after Dodd's birth she found a job and worked diligently to support her children. Despite the hard work, she still found time every day to read to her children, instilling in Dodd a love of books.

Dodd attended college in Boise, Idaho, where she met her husband, Scott. After graduation, she worked as a draftsman in an engineering firm, designing a sawmill. During her lunch hour, Dodd would begin reading a romance novel. While working during the afternoon, she would often plot an ending for the story, and almost always eventually discovered that she liked her endings better than the ones the author intended. After her daughter was born in 1980, Dodd decided to stay at home and try to write a book. Over the next ten years, she wrote three romance novels. For five of these years, she also worked part-time at an independent bookstore. By talking to customers and watching what they purchased, Dodd was able to learn more about what people like to read. Her first two manuscripts were consistently rejected. The third, Candle in the Window, won the Romance Writers of America Golden Heart Award for unpublished authors, resulting in its publication in 1991 by HarperCollins. The book won many awards and has not gone out of print.

Her first editor was conservative, and often cut or severely trimmed the love scenes that Dodd had written. When Dodd moved from HarperCollins to Avon, her new editor chose not to interfere in the love scenes. Her first novel for Avon, A Well Pleasured Lady, was the first of her novels to include love scenes written in Dodd's "normal, unedited frankness." A Well Pleasured Lady also marked Dodd's transition to writing historical romances set in the Regency period. Regencies allowed her to continue writing historicals while including fewer details on "what the characters are wearing, what the idioms mean, and who the scions of society were."

The heroines of Dodd's historical romance novels are based on her mother, an "impoverished yet determined woman who, in spite of adversity, fights to take control of her life and always wins." Her novels have since been translated into twelve languages and have appeared on The New York Times, USA Today, and Publishers Weekly bestseller lists. Her 2003 novel, My Favorite Bride, spent 15 weeks in the top 15 of the New York Times Best Seller List. The Romance Writers of America have awarded her their RITA Award, the highest honor given to romance novelists. Dodd has even appeared as a clue in the Los Angeles Times crossword puzzle (on November 18, 2005).

In 2003 Dodd released her first contemporary romance.

Dodd and her family have lived in California, Idaho, and Texas, but they currently reside in Washington. She and her husband constructed a 5300-pound standing stone circle on their Washington property, where they celebrate the annual summer solstice.

== Writing process ==
Dodd normally begins her writing process with a 10-20 page outline of the story. Every morning, she revises the pages that she wrote the day before. After refamiliarizing herself with the storyline, she then continues writing. She will also usually lightly outline the next few chapters that she is intending to write. When she reaches the midpoint of the manuscript, she often does a larger-scale revision. By the time she reaches the conclusion of the story, it is ready to be sent to the editors.

Dodd also relies occasionally on plot weekends. She and several friends who are romance novelists, including Connie Brockway and Susan Mallery, meet at a hotel for three days. Each author takes a turn, describing the type of book she wants to write and the ideas that she already has. The group then brainstorms various plot scenarios.

== Bibliography ==
=== My First ===
- Candle in the Window (1991)
- Castles in the Air (1993)

=== My Stand Alone ===
- Treasure of the Sun (1991)
- Priceless (1992)
- Outrageous (1994)
- Move Heaven and Earth (1995)
- That Scandalous Evening (1998)

=== Knight ===
- Once a Knight (1996)
- A Knight to Remember (1997)

=== Well Pleasured ===
- Well Pleasured Lady (1997)
- A Well Favored Gentleman (1998)

=== Princess ===
- The Runaway Princess (1999)
- Someday My Prince (1999)

=== Governess Brides ===
- That Scandalous Evening (1998)

(Technically, That Scandalous Evening is not part of the Governess Brides series and is listed under the "My Stand Alone" heading, but characters in the book do show up and the events in the novel take place before those in the later Governess Brides books.)

- Rules of Surrender (2000)
- Rules of Engagement (2000)
- Rules of Attraction (2001)
- In My Wildest Dreams (2001)
- Lost in Your Arms (2002)
- My Favorite Bride (2002)
- My Fair Temptress (2005)
- In Bed with the Duke (2010)
- Taken by the Prince (2011)

=== Lost Texas Heart ===
- Just the Way You Are (2003)
- Almost Like Being in Love (2004)
- Close to You (2005)

=== Switching Places ===
- Scandalous Again (2003)
- One Kiss from You (2003)

=== Lost Princesses ===
- Some Enchanted Evening (2004)
- The Barefoot Princess (2006)
- The Prince Kidnaps a Bride (2006)

=== The Chosen Ones ===
- Storm of Visions (2009)
- Storm of Shadows (2009)
- Chains of Ice (2010)
- Chains of Fire (2010)
- Wilder (August 2012)

=== Darkness Chosen ===
- Scent of Darkness (2007)
- Touch of Darkness (2007)
- Into the Shadow (2008)
- Into the Flame (2008)

=== The Fortune Hunters ===
This series is loosely tied to the earlier "Lost Texas Heart" series

- Trouble in High Heels (2006)
- Tongue in Chic (2007)
- Thigh High (2008)
- Danger in a Red Dress (2009)

=== Scarlet Deception ===
- Secrets of Bella Terra (2011)
- Revenge at Bella Terra (2011)
- Betrayal (2012)

=== Virtue Falls Series ===
- Virtue Falls (2014)
- Obsession Falls (2015)
- Because I'm Watching (2016)
- The Woman Who Couldn't Scream (2017)

=== Cape Charade Series ===
- Hard to Kill (2018) shortstory
- Dead Girl Running (2018)
- Families & Other Enemies (2019) Novella
- What Doesn't Kill Her (2019)
- Hidden Truths (2019) Novella
- Strangers She Knows (2019)

=== Right Motive, Wrong Alibi Series ===
- Right Motive (2020) Novella
- Wrong Alibi (2022)

=== Novels ===
- Lady in Black (1993)
- The Greatest Lover in All England (1994)
- Once Upon a Pillow (2002) (with Connie Brockway)

=== Omnibus ===
- Tall, Dark, and Dangerous (1994) (with Catherine Anderson and Susan Sizemore)
- One Night With a Rogue (1995) (with Kimberly Cates, Deborah Martin (Sabrina Jeffries) and Anne Stuart)
- Scottish Brides (1999) (with Stephanie Laurens, Julia Quinn and Karen Ranney)
- My Scandalous Bride (2004) (with Celeste Bradley, Leslie LaFoy and Stephanie Laurens)
- Hero, Come Back (2005) (with Elizabeth Boyle and Stephanie Laurens)

== Awards ==
- 1992 - Romance Writers of America RITA Award, Best First Book – Candle in the Window
- Romance Writers of America Golden Heart Award, Candle in the Window
- Library Journal Top 5 Romances of 1997, A Well Pleasured Lady
- 1999 Romance Writers of America RITA Award finalist, A Well Favored Gentleman
