= Connie Brockway =

American novelist

- Born: December 16, 1954 (age 71); Minneapolis, Minnesota, USA
- Occupation: Novelist
- Spouse: David Brockway (1976-present)
- Children: 1
- Writing career
- Pen name: Connie Brockway
- Language: English
- Period: 1994 - present
- Genre: Romance
- Notable works: My Dearest Enemy, The Bridal Season
- Notable awards: RITA award – Long Historical Romance; 1999 My Dearest Enemy; RITA award – Long Historical Romance; 2002 The Bridal Season
- Website: www.conniebrockway.com

Connie Brockway (born December 16, 1954) is an American author of over twenty historical and contemporary romance novels since 1994.

== Biography ==
Connie Brockway was born on December 16, 1954, in Minneapolis, Minnesota, but spent several years in suburban Buffalo, New York. Her family returned to Edina, Minnesota, where she attended high school. In 1976, Brockway received a B.A. from Macalester College in St. Paul, Minnesota. While earning an M.A. in Creative Writing at the University of Minnesota, she met her future husband, David Brockway, medical student, now a family physician. They married in November 1976. They have a daughter. The couple currently live in Minnesota.

Brockway decided to take a year and try to write a book once her daughter entered school. In 1994, Brockway published her first book, Promise Me Heaven. Over 1.5 million copies of her books are now in print, and they can be found in thirteen countries. Although Brockway made her mark with historical romance, in 2005 she announced that she would take a hiatus from historical romance and begin writing contemporary romance novels.

== Bibliography ==
=== Single Titles ===
- Promise Me Heaven (February 1994)
- Anything For Love (October 1994)
- A Dangerous Man (July 1996)
- All Through the Night (September 1997)
- My Dearest Enemy (July 1998)
- Hot Dish (November 2006)
- Skinny Dipping (January 2008)
- So Enchanting (February 2009)
- The Golden Season (February 2010)
- "Highlander Undone" (September 2015)

=== Braxton Series ===
1. As you desire (February 1997)
2. The Other Guy's Bride (December 2011)

=== McClairen's Isle ===
1. The Passionate One (1999)
2. The Reckless One (2000)
3. The Ravishing One (2000)

=== The Bridal Stories ===
1. The Bridal Season (2001)
2. Bridal Favors (2002)

=== Rose Hunters ===
1. My Seduction (2004)
2. My Pleasure (2004)
3. My Surrender (2005)

=== Lady Most Series (with Eloisa James and Julia Quinn) ===
1. The Lady Most Likely... (2010)
2. The Lady Most Willing... (2012)

=== Anthologies in collaboration ===
- Outlaw Love (1997) (with Brenda Joyce, Cait Logan and Stephanie Mittman)
- My Scottish Summer (2001) (with Patti Berg, Debra Dier and Kathleen Givens)
- Once Upon a Pillow (2002) (with Christina Dodd)
- The True Love Wedding Dress (2005) (with Catherine Anderson, Casey Claybourne and Barbara Metzger)

== Awards ==
Brockway has been a finalist for the Romance Writers of America's RITA Award eight times, winning twice:

- 1999 - Romance Writers of America RITA Award, Long Historical Romance – My Dearest Enemy
- 2002 - Romance Writers of America RITA Award, Long Historical Romance – The Bridal Season
