= An Offer from a Gentleman =

2001 novel by Julia Quinn

- Author: Julia Quinn
- Language: English
- Series: Bridgerton series
- Genre: Fiction, Romance, Historical fiction
- Publisher: Avon
- Publication date: July 3, 2001
- Publication place: United States
- Media type: Mass market paperback
- Pages: 384
- ISBN: 0380815583
- Preceded by: The Viscount Who Loved Me
- Followed by: Romancing Mister Bridgerton

An Offer from a Gentleman is a 2001 Regency-era romance novel written by Julia Quinn. It is the third novel in her Bridgerton series about the eponymous family. It tells the love story of Benedict, the second child and second son of the family. Different from the rest of the series, it is modeled on a fairy tale, specifically Cinderella. A deluxe collector's edition was released on November 25, 2025. The book was adapted into the fourth season of the Netflix series Bridgerton which premiered on January 29, 2026.

== Plot ==
Sophia "Sophie" Beckett, the illegitimate daughter of the late Richard Gunningworth, Earl of Penwood, is serving as a maid in the home of her step-mother, Araminta Gunningworth, Countess of Penwood, and two step-sisters, Rosamund and Posy Reiling. Sophie had been raised as the Earl's "ward" and educated until he died when she was fourteen. In his will, he stipulated that Araminta's annual allowance would triple if she sheltered Sophie until age 20. Araminta resentfully did so, by making Sophie an unpaid maid.

In 1815, Sophie is 20 and assists her stepmother and stepsisters as they prepare for the Bridgerton family's masquerade ball. After they leave, the other servants help Sophie dress up to go to the ball, as long as she leaves by midnight.

Benedict Bridgerton, second child and second son of the family, is considered one of the prime bachelors of the social season. He resents that people know him and that ladies wish to marry him just because he is Bridgerton "Number Two," and not for himself. At the masquerade ball, he meets Sophie and is intrigued at how different she is than other young women he knows. She realizes who he is based on descriptions in the gossip periodical Lady Whistledown's Society Papers. They dance and kiss on the house's private terrace. He removes one of her gloves, before the clock strikes midnight and she flees. The glove bears the family crest of Penwood, so he visits the family and is disappointed that neither Rosamund nor Posy are "the lady in silver." Araminta realizes he was looking for Sophie, who had snuck into the ball. Sophie is kicked out and steals a pair of Araminta's shoe clips before leaving London to find a new job.

Two years later, Benedict has all but given up hope at finding the lady in silver. He attends a party in the country and stops three of the other men from sexually assaulting a maid, Sophie. He doesn't recognize her, but drives her to his nearby estate, called "My Cottage," and promises to find her other employment. A rainstorm causes him to fall ill and Sophie takes care of him. While he recovers, she is treated as a guest and they get to know each other. They share a kiss and he asks her to be his mistress. She refuses because she knows how hard it is to be the illegitimate child of a nobleman, but cannot tell Benedict why. He blackmails her into coming to work for his mother in London and they travel there together. Sophie continues telling the lie that she is well-educated because her former employers were generous.

In Araminta's home, Sophie had been doing the unpaid work of three maids. To replace her, Araminta started a "housemaid war" by poaching other families' staff, including one from the Bridgertons'. Sophie fills the position as a lady's maid for Benedict's sisters at Lady Bridgerton's home. The Bridgerton ladies include Sophie in their afternoon teas. Benedict visits often and they become intimate once, but she still refuses to become his mistress and explains she does not want to have an illegitimate child.

Two weeks later, Sophie is having tea with the Bridgerton ladies and mentions that Benedict is an artist, which they did not know. Penelope visits and nearly recognizes Sophie from the masquerade ball. As she leaves, Penelope overhears Colin Bridgerton telling his brothers that he would never marry her. Benedict asks his mother about being with someone unsuitable and she says she will support him, though he would likely be ostracized from society. He finds Sophie wearing a blindfold while playing with the children, and finally realizes she is the lady in silver. He confronts her for not telling him and she reveals the full truth of who she is: an Earl's bastard.

Sophie resigns from the Bridgertons'. On the street, she is caught by Araminta and is arrested as a thief. Benedict decides he wants to marry Sophie and goes looking for her. Tipped off by Whistledown, Benedict and Violet go to the prison and find Araminta taunting Sophie. Posy takes the blame for stealing her mother's shoe clips and reveals Araminta had stolen the dowry the Earl had left for Sophie. Violet uses that information to blackmail Araminta into legitimizing Sophie as a Penwood cousin and invites Posy to come live with the Bridgertons. Sophie goes home with Benedict. In the epilogue, Sophie and Benedict have been married seven years, live happily outside society at My Cottage, and are expecting their fourth child.

== Adaptation ==
The third novel is the basis of the fourth season of the Netflix series Bridgerton. It debuted in two parts: the first four episodes premiering on January 29, 2026, and the last four episodes on February 26. Luke Thompson resumes his role as Benedict Bridgerton and Australian-Korean actress Yerin Ha portrays the renamed Sophie Baek. The adaptation does not include the two year time skip.
