= The Viscount Who Loved Me =

2000 historical romance novel by Julia Quinn

- First edition cover
- Author: Julia Quinn
- Language: English
- Series: Bridgerton series
- Genre: Fiction, Romance, Historical fiction
- Publisher: Avon
- Publication date: December 5, 2000
- Publication place: United States
- Media type: Mass market paperback
- Pages: 354
- ISBN: 0062353640
- Preceded by: The Duke and I
- Followed by: An Offer from a Gentleman

The Viscount Who Loved Me is a 2000 historical romance novel written by Julia Quinn, first published by Avon. It is the second novel of Quinn's Bridgerton series set in Regency England and tells the story of Anthony, Viscount Bridgerton, the eldest Bridgerton sibling. It is a #1 New York Times Best Seller.

== Plot ==
In 1814, after years as one of the most notorious rakes of the ton, Anthony, Viscount Bridgerton, decides to settle down and carry on the family line. Haunted by his father's death at a young age from a bee sting, Anthony now believes, albeit irrationally, that he will die young too, and does not want the complication of falling in love.

Meanwhile, Kate Sheffield arrives in London's ton with her younger half-sister Edwina and her stepmother Mary. She is determined to find a suitable husband for Edwina, who is intelligent and renowned for her beauty, and is less hopeful about her own prospects as a near spinster. When Anthony begins to court Edwina, Kate is determined to interfere, doubting that he is reformed from his roguish ways. Despite the animosity between the two, a mutual attraction begins to develop when they share a kiss.

While visiting Aubrey Hall, the Bridgertons' country estate, Kate is stung by a bee while with Anthony. He is overcome with fear and attempts to tend the wound; they are caught in a compromising position by their mothers, leading Anthony to declare he will marry Kate to protect their reputations. Society gossip accepts that the viscount was actually courting Kate rather than Edwina. Edwina is happy for them, having suspected both Kate and Anthony's affection. However, Kate struggles with her growing feelings for Anthony as he insists that while he will marry her, he will never love her.

Anthony becomes conflicted when he starts falling in love with his wife. Kate ends up in a carriage accident and Anthony ends up admitting to her that he loves her.

== Reception ==
In March 2022, People ranked The Viscount Who Loved Me, a perennial fan favorite, as the best book of the Bridgerton series for its enemies-to-lovers trope "full of banter and chemistry" with character development for the central couple, "both as a pair and on their own."

- #1 New York Times Best Seller
- USA Today Best Seller List
- Publishers Weekly Mass Market Bestseller
- New York Times Extended Bestseller list
- 2001 RITA Awards Nomination in the Long Historical Category

== Adaptation ==
The novel is the inspiration for the second season of the Netflix series Bridgerton which premiered on March 25, 2022. Jonathan Bailey reprised his role as Anthony, Viscount Bridgerton with Simone Ashley playing Kate. The season amassed 193 million viewing hours in its opening weekend, the highest opening for any English-language Netflix series at the time. It also broke the record for most viewed English-language series in a single week at that time, with 251.74 million viewing hours from March 28 to April 3. By April 19, Bridgerton's second season had overtaken its predecessor as the most watched English-language television series on Netflix at the time with 627.11 million hours viewed since its launch.
