= Pendulum (2027 film) =

- Teaser poster
- Directed by: Mark Heyman
- Written by: Mark Heyman
- Produced by: Darren Aronofsky; Dave Caplan; Jacob Jaffke
- Starring: Joseph Gordon-Levitt; Phoebe Dynevor; Jacki Weaver; Norman Reedus
- Music by: Ben Lovett
- Production companies: Protozoa Pictures; C2 Motion Picture Group; Motel Mojave
- Distributed by: Vertical
- Release date: January 1, 2027
- Country: United States
- Language: English

Pendulum is an upcoming American horror mystery thriller film written and directed by Mark Heyman, starring Joseph Gordon-Levitt, Phoebe Dynevor, Jacki Weaver and Norman Reedus, and produced by Darren Aronofsky.

The film is scheduled to be released in the United States on January 1, 2027.

== Premise ==
At a new-age retreat in New Mexico, a couple have differing reactions to the unconventional practices of enigmatic group leader Ella Rose.

== Cast ==
- Joseph Gordon-Levitt as Patrick
- Phoebe Dynevor as Abigail
- Jacki Weaver as Ella Rose
- Norman Reedus
- Jena Malone
- Anna Deavere Smith as Cora

== Production ==
In October 2024, it was announced that Mark Heyman would write and direct Pendulum with Darren Aronofsky set to produce. In March 2025, Joseph Gordon-Levitt and Phoebe Dynevor joined the cast. In April 2025, Norman Reedus and Jacki Weaver joined the cast.

Filming began in April 2025 in New Mexico.

In May 2026, Ben Lovett had been hired to compose the score.

== Release ==
Pendulum is set to be released in the United States by Vertical on January 1, 2027.
