= Bridgerton (novel series) =

Series of Regency romance novels by Julia Quinn

- First edition covers of the first eight novels of the Bridgerton series
- The Duke and I (2000); The Viscount Who Loved Me (2000); An Offer from a Gentleman (2001); Romancing Mister Bridgerton (2002); To Sir Phillip, With Love (2003); When He Was Wicked (2004); It's In His Kiss (2005); On the Way to the Wedding (2006)
- Author: Julia Quinn
- Country: United States
- Language: English
- Genre: Fiction, Romance, Historical fiction
- Publisher: Avon
- Published: 2000–2006
- Media type: Print
- No. of books: 8 (with 9 short stories, and 3 companions)

Bridgerton is a series of eight Regency romance novels written by Julia Quinn. Published from 2000 to 2006, the Bridgerton series tells a story of eight siblings of the fictional noble Bridgerton family as they navigate London high society in search of love, adventure and happiness.

The novels have been adapted by Shondaland into an American television series, Bridgerton, which premiered in 2020 on Netflix.

== Background ==
Set between 1813 and 1827, each novel features one of the eight children of the late Viscount Bridgerton and his widow Violet: Anthony (who is the current Viscount Bridgerton), Benedict, Colin, Daphne, Eloise, Francesca, Gregory, and Hyacinth. The Bridgerton family are part of British nobility and are a well respected, immensely loving, and tight-knit clan favored among high society.

The Bridgertons are by far the most prolific family in the upper echelons of society. Such industriousness on the part of the viscountess and the late viscount is commendable, although one can find only banality in their choice of names of their children. Anthony, Benedict, Colin, Daphne, Eloise, Francesca, Gregory, and Hyacinth – orderliness is, of course, beneficial in all things, but one would think that intelligent parents would be able to keep their children straight without needing to alphabetize their names.

— Lady Whistledown's Society Papers, The Duke and I

== Publishing history ==
1. The Duke and I (2000, Daphne's story)
2. The Viscount Who Loved Me (2000, Anthony's story)
3. An Offer from a Gentleman (2001, Benedict's story)
4. Romancing Mister Bridgerton (2002, Colin's story)
5. To Sir Phillip, With Love (2003, Eloise's story)
6. When He Was Wicked (2004, Francesca's story)
7. It's In His Kiss (2005, Hyacinth's story)
8. On the Way to the Wedding (2006, Gregory's story)

== Characters ==
=== Bridgerton family tree ===
			Edmund, Viscount Bridgerton † (1764–1803)		Violet (née Ledger), Viscountess; Bridgerton (b. 1766)
Anthony, Viscount Bridgerton (b. 1784)	Benedict Bridgerton (b. 1786)	Colin Bridgerton (b. 1791)		Daphne Bridgerton (b. 1792)	Eloise Bridgerton (b. 1796)	Francesca Bridgerton (b. 1797)	Gregory Bridgerton (b. 1801)	Hyacinth Bridgerton (b. 1803)

Character	Actor in Netflix's Bridgerton								
Character	Actor in Netflix's Bridgerton	The Duke and I	The Viscount Who Loved Me	An Offer from a Gentleman	Romancing Mister Bridgerton	To Sir Phillip, With Love	When He Was Wicked	It's In His Kiss	On the Way to the Wedding
Anthony	Jonathan Bailey	Appearance	Own story	Appearance	Appearance	Appearance		Appearance	Appearance
Benedict	Luke Thompson	Appearance	Appearance	Own story	Appearance	Appearance			
Colin	Luke Newton	Appearance	Appearance	Appearance	Own story	Appearance	Appearance		Appearance
Daphne	Phoebe Dynevor	Own story	Appearance	Appearance	Appearance			Appearance	Appearance
Eloise	Claudia Jessie	Appearance	Appearance	Appearance	Appearance	Own story	Appearance		
Francesca	Ruby Stokes / Hannah Dodd	Appearance		Appearance			Own story		
Gregory	Will Tilston	Appearance	Appearance			Appearance		Appearance	Own story
Hyacinth	Florence Hunt	Appearance	Appearance	Appearance	Appearance		Appearance	Own story	Appearance

== Reception ==
=== Critical response ===
The Duke and I was criticized for the inclusion of non-consensual sex between Simon and Daphne, which amounted to marital rape. Critics pointed out that it failed to acknowledge the difficulties of male victims of rape, especially since Simon was traumatized after the event.

People ranked The Viscount Who Loved Me, a perennial fan favorite, as the best book of the Bridgerton series for its enemies-to-lovers trope "full of banter and chemistry" with character development for the central couple, "both as a pair and on their own."

On the Way to the Wedding won the Romance Writers of America RITA Award in 2007. In 2002, To Sir Phillip, With Love was named one of the six best mass market original novels of the year by Publishers Weekly.

=== Sales ===
Well-received when they were first published, the novels received a surge on book sales when the Netflix series Bridgerton premiered its first season in December 2020, and again, for its second season in March 2022. Several titles in the series have been on The New York Times bestseller list, including at several weeks #1 with The Duke and I and The Viscount Who Loved Me.

== Spin-offs ==
=== The Bridgertons: Happily Ever After ===
The Bridgertons: Happily Ever After was published in 2013, and is sometimes numbered as the 9th book in the series. It consists of second epilogues for each of the 8 novels in the main Bridgerton series, together with a short story about Violet Bridgerton herself.

=== Rokesby series ===
The Rokesby series, also called The Bridgerton Prequels, focus on the Rokesby family and are set before the Bridgerton series, featuring younger versions of some of the same characters.

1. Because of Miss Bridgerton (2016)
2. The Girl with the Make-Believe Husband (2017)
3. The Other Miss Bridgerton (2018)
4. First Comes Scandal (2020)

=== Collaborations ===
The Further Observations of Lady Whistledown and Lady Whistledown Strikes Back are two anthology novels by Julia Quinn and 3 other authors, featuring the character of Lady Whistledown who was introduced in the Bridgerton series.

Queen Charlotte is a novel co-written by Julia Quinn and Shonda Rhimes, set in the Bridgerton universe.

== Adaptation ==
The book series has been adapted by Shondaland, for Netflix, into a television series titled Bridgerton which premiered on the platform in 2020. It follows the format of the novels, with each season focusing on a different Bridgerton sibling, and their quest for marriage. Queen Charlotte was also adapted for Netflix into Queen Charlotte: A Bridgerton Story.
