= Luke Newton =

British actor (born 1993)

- Born: Luke Paul Anthony Atkinson; 5 February 1993 (age 33); Shoreham-By-Sea, England
- Education: London School of Musical Theatre
- Occupation: Actor
- Years active: 2010–present

Luke Paul Anthony Newton (né Atkinson) (born 5 February 1993) is an English actor. He played the role of Colin in the Netflix period drama Bridgerton (2020–present) and had roles in the BBC Two drama The Cut (2009) and the Disney Channel series The Lodge (2016–2017).

== Early life ==
Luke Newton grew up in Shoreham-by-Sea, West Sussex, with his younger sister, Lauren. His mother, Michelle, remarried in 2006. Newton's father was a singer on Stars in Their Eyes and his two maternal aunts were in the West End.

Newton attended St Nicolas and St Mary's Primary School, followed by Steyning Grammar School and then going on to Northbrook College Sussex (now part of Greater Brighton Metropolitan College). He formed the boy band South 4 with Oli Reynolds (then Evans), Joel Baylis and Henry Tredinnick. Newton was scouted by an agent in Brighton while he was in a local production of Billy Elliot. He went on to train at the London School of Musical Theatre.

== Career ==
=== 2010–2019: The Cut, The Lodge and theatre beginnings ===
In 2010, Newton made his television debut in the BBC Two teen series The Cut as Luke Atwood, appearing in 11 episodes. Newton made his professional stage debut as an Elder Price understudy in the West End run of The Book of Mormon in 2013. The following year, he appeared in two episodes of the BBC soap opera Doctors as Sam Hern.

From 2016 to 2017, Newton starred in the Disney Channel series The Lodge as Ben Evans. While appearing on the series, he was also featured on the two accompanying soundtrack albums. In 2018, he starred in the Syfy television film Lake Placid: Legacy as Billy.

=== 2020–present: Bridgerton and further work ===
In 2020, Newton began playing Colin, the third eldest Bridgerton son, in the Shondaland-produced Netflix period drama Bridgerton. A supporting character in the first two series, it was announced in May 2022 that he and co-star Nicola Coughlan would lead the third series, a change from Julia Quinn's Regency romance book series in which their characters lead the fourth novel Romancing Mister Bridgerton. In November 2024, Newton featured in the "Royally Sexy" portfolio of People's Sexiest Man Alive issue. Newton earned a spot on the IMDb year-end list of Most Popular Stars of 2024. In May 2025, Newton came in at 93 on the Radio Times TV 100 List.

Newton returned to the stage as Adam in the 2023 revival of The Shape of Things at the Park Theatre. Newton received critical praise for his performance starring opposite Amber Anderson. The revival would go on to be nominated for Best Off-West End Production at the 24th Annual WhatsOnStage Awards. Also in 2023, Newton did voice work for the Portuguese animated film Viana: The Legend of the Golden Hearts as Thomas, a Portuguese guitar craftsman who falls in love with Princess Ana.

In 2024, Newton is set to star alongside actress Lucy Hale in the sci-fi thriller White Mars.

In August and September 2025, Newton portrayed fashion designer Alexander McQueen in the off-Broadway play House of McQueen. He was succeeded in the role by Liam Tamne.

== Personal life ==
Newton has dyslexia and ADHD. Newton's grandfather Ken died during the COVID-19 pandemic; the family raised over £3,000 for the Love Your Hospital charity in his name.

== Filmography ==
Key
†	Denotes productions that have not yet been released

=== Film ===
Year	Title	Role	Notes	Refs.
2014	Twist and Pulse's Halloween Thriller	Michael	Short film	
2019	Youth in Bed	Ethan	Short film	
2026	Viana: The Legend of the Golden Hearts †	Thomas	Voice role	
2027	White Mars †	Leo	Post-production	
tba	Girl †		Post-production	

=== Television ===
Year	Title	Role	Notes	Refs.
2010	The Cut	Luke Atwood	Main role; 11 episodes	
2011	Sadie J	Brad	1 episode	
2013	Mr Selfridge	Richard Brackenbury	1 episode	
2014	Doctors	Sam Hern	2 episodes	
2016–2017	The Lodge	Ben Evans	Main role; 25 episodes	
2018	Lake Placid: Legacy	Billy	Television film	
2020–present	Bridgerton	Colin Bridgerton	Main role; 31 episodes	

=== Theatre ===
Year	Title	Role	Director	Venue	Notes	Refs.
2013	The Book of Mormon	Swing	Casey Nicholaw & Trey Parker	Prince of Wales Theatre, London	Understudy for Elder Price	
2015	Loserville	Michael Dork	Michael Burgen	Union Theatre, London		
2015	Legally Blonde	Warner Huntington III	Mitch Sebastian	Kilworth House Theatre, Leicestershire		
2023	The Shape of Things	Adam	Nicky Allpress	Park Theatre, London		
2025	House of McQueen	Alexander McQueen	Sam Helfrich	The Mansion at Hudson Yards, New York City		

== Awards and nominations ==
=== Film & Television ===
Year	Award	Category	Nominated work	Result	Ref.
2021	Screen Actors Guild Awards	Outstanding Performance by an Ensemble in a Drama Series	Bridgerton	Nominated	
2025	TV Choice Awards	Best Drama Performance	Bridgerton	Nominated	
2025	Screen Actors Guild Awards	Outstanding Performance by an Ensemble in a Drama Series	Bridgerton	Nominated	
2025	The Astra Awards	Best Cast Ensemble in a Streaming Drama Series	Bridgerton	Nominated	
2025	BAFTA TV Awards	P&C Cruises Memorable Moment	Bridgerton	Nominated	
2025	Edinburgh TV Awards	TV Moment of the Year 2025	Bridgerton	Won	

=== Theatre ===
Year	Award	Category	Nominated work	Result	Ref.
2026	BroadwayWorld Off-Broadway Awards	Best Performance In A Play (Off-Broadway)	House of McQueen	Won	
2026	BroadwayWorld Off-Broadway Awards	Best Solo Performance (Non-Cabaret) (Off-Broadway)	House of McQueen	Won	
