= The Duke and I =

2000 historical romance novel by Julia Quinn

- First edition cover
- Author: Julia Quinn
- Language: English
- Series: Bridgerton series
- Genre: Fiction, Romance, Historical fiction
- Publisher: Avon
- Publication date: January 5, 2000
- Publication place: United States
- Media type: Mass market paperback
- Pages: 384
- ISBN: 0380800829
- Followed by: The Viscount Who Loved Me

The Duke and I is a 2000 historical romance novel written by Julia Quinn, first published by Avon. It is the first novel of Quinn's series of Regency romances about the Bridgerton siblings and tells the story of Daphne, the fourth child and eldest daughter of the family.

== Summary ==
In 1813, Simon Basset, Duke of Hastings, returns to London after a long period away from home. Unbeknownst to the rest of society, Simon was severely neglected by his father due to a severe stutter that plagued him as a child. Simon has developed a reputation as being haughty and arrogant due to his long silences to cover his stutter.

Going to meet his godmother, Lady Danbury, Simon discovers a young woman being harassed by an overly-pushy suitor. Before he can rescue the young lady, she punches out the suitor. Simon becomes attracted to the young woman until he learns she is Daphne Bridgerton, the sister of his friend Anthony Bridgerton. Both Anthony and Daphne have been pushed onto the marriage mart by their mother Violet and both find their prospects dull.

Simon quickly finds that as a handsome, wealthy and unmarried duke he is considered an extremely eligible bachelor. As Daphne is the only reasonable woman whose company he can bear, he offers to pretend to court her so that other men will see her as attractive and so that enterprising mothers will think he is spoken for and leave him alone. Anthony disapproves of the courtship between Simon and Daphne even after learning that it is fake. He nevertheless allows it to continue as he realizes Daphne is being courted by more suitors than ever before.

Daphne and Simon each begin to fall in love with each other during their fake courtship. At a ball Daphne tries to seduce Simon luring him out to the garden where they kiss. They are discovered by Anthony who demands Simon marry Daphne after he has compromised her. After Simon refuses Anthony challenges him to a duel. Knowing that Simon will probably die, Daphne intervenes and pleads with Simon to marry her so her honour will be protected. Simon reluctantly agrees to marry her, but warns that he can never have children.

Daphne and Simon are married quickly. Violet tries to explain sexual intercourse to Daphne, who finds the instructions vague and confusing. Because Simon has told her he cannot have children she initially believes he is impotent but they are able to have sex which they both find fulfilling.

For their honeymoon, Simon takes Daphne to the estate where he spent his childhood. The housekeeper tells Daphne about Simon's childhood stutter. Through the housekeeper's vague insinuations Daphne also realizes that Simon has been purposefully preventing her from having children by pulling out as they have sex and is not infertile as she was led to believe. This leads to a rift between the married couple and Daphne decides not to have sex with Simon as long as he does not want to have children.

Depressed, Simon goes out and drinks heavily. Later, after he returns home drunk Daphne has sex with him while he is barely conscious and then, ignoring his feeble protests, forces him to finish inside of her in an effort to become pregnant despite his wishes. Traumatized by this, Simon resumes his childhood stuttering and runs away, informing Daphne to write to him only if she is pregnant. Daphne returns to London.

After two months Daphne writes to Simon to tell him she is pregnant. Simon returns to her and discovers that her period was only delayed. He confesses he misses her and she tells him that even if their child had a stutter she would love their child the same. The two reconcile and decide to start trying for children.

In 1817, after three daughters Daphne finally gives birth to a boy they call David.

A second epilogue, originally written as an online exclusive, later reveals that at 41 Daphne becomes pregnant with a fifth child. She is also visited by her brother Colin and his wife who come to see Simon for advice as they fear their child has a speech impediment. Unsure of what to tell them, Simon opens letters his late father left him and discovers there is nothing of value in them. He burns them and he and Daphne talk of how excited they are to become parents again.

== Reception ==
After the release of the Netflix series Bridgerton on December 25, 2020, sales of novel and other books in Quinn's series surged. It was #1 on the New York Times Best Seller List for weeks. In January 2021, it was #11 on Publishers Weekly’s mass market bestseller list next week and #9 on the trade paperback list.

=== Criticism ===
The novel was criticized for the inclusion of non-consensual sex between Simon and Daphne which amounted to marital rape. It depicts Daphne who wants children, having sex with an inebriated and half-asleep Simon, bearing down on him and not letting him pull out of her when he climaxes despite his objections, and prior declarations that he does not want children.

Daphne felt the strangest, most intoxicating surge of power. He was in her control, she realized. He was asleep, and probably still more than a little bit drunk, and she could do whatever she wanted with him.

She could have whatever she wanted.

A quick glance at his face told her that he was still sleeping…She felt so powerful looming over him…His eyes pinned upon her with a strange, pleading sort of look, and he made a feeble attempt to pull away. Daphne bore down on him with all her might….She planted her hands underneath him, using all of her strength to hold him against her.

— Daphne's perspective before the sexual assault in the novel

Described as one of the toxic plot points of their relationship, it drew further criticism due to the fact that the violation of consent was never addressed as morally wrong in the novel. Critics pointed out that it failed to acknowledge the difficulties of male victims of rape, especially since Simon was traumatized after the event.

Daphne had aroused him in his sleep, taken advantage of him while he was still slightly intoxicated, and held him to her while he poured his seed into her. This complete loss of speech, this choking, strangling feeling—He had worked his entire life to escape it, and now she had brought it back with a vengeance.

— Simon's perspective after the sexual assault in the novel

Quinn has stated that readers' reactions to the scene have changed since the book's publication in 2000. In a 2021 interview, she said, "Women’s understanding of ourselves and our agency has changed so much. It’s harder for us to identify with Daphne and the fact that, within that marriage and in that society, she has no power. I’m not saying what she did was right. I’m just saying it’s harder for a modern woman to understand it than it was 20 years ago."

== Adaptation ==
The novel is the basis of the first season of the Netflix series Bridgerton which premiered on December 25, 2020. Phoebe Dynevor portrayed Daphne Bridgerton, Regé-Jean Page portrayed Simon Bassett, and Jonathan Bailey portrayed Anthony Bridgerton.

Like the novel, the sixth episode of the Netflix adaptation, entitled "Swish", drew criticism with regards to the non-consensual nature of Simon and Daphne's lovemaking. Critics also pointed out that it perpetuates fetishisation of black men in the media as Simon is played by a black actor in the series.

Quinn said of the setting changes in the show, "Previously, I’ve gotten dinged by the historical accuracy police. [...] This is already romantic fantasy, and I think it’s more important to show that as many people as possible deserve this type of happiness and dignity."
