= Ciara Baxendale =

English actress

- Born: 19 July 1995 (age 29); Helmshore, Lancashire, England
- Occupation: Actress
- Years active: 2011–present

Ciara Baxendale (born 19 July 1995) is an English actress.

== Early life ==
Baxendale was born on 19 July 1995 in Helmshore, Lancashire. She graduated from a one-year foundation course at the Royal Academy of Dramatic Art and is a member of the National Youth Film Academy.

== Career ==
Baxendale is perhaps best known for her role as Izzy on the E4 teen comedy-drama series My Mad Fat Diary (2013–2015). She has also starred in films such as Spike Island (2012) and series such as Little Crackers (2011), The Driver (2014), and DCI Banks (2015).

== Personal life ==
Ciara has 2 sisters and is the middle child. In 2024, Ciara's younger sister Orla died of anaphylactic shock after eating mislabeled cookies. She was living in the United States and was a dancer for MOMIX at the time of her death.

== Filmography ==
=== Film ===
Year	Title	Role	Notes
2011	Barbra	Patsy	
2011	Élan Vital	Young Girl	
2012	Spike Island	Late Girl	
2016	Silly Girl	Joanne	Short film
2025	Inheritance	Emily	

=== Television ===
Year	Title	Role	Notes
2011	Little Crackers	Patsy	Episode "Jane Horrocks' Little Cracker"
2013–2015	My Mad Fat Diary	Izzy	16 episodes
2014	The Driver	Amanda	Episode #1.2
2014	Harriet's Army	Harriet Grange	Mini-series
2015	DCI Banks	Evie	2 episodes
2019	Four Weddings and a Funeral	Midge	Miniseries
2021–2022	Trying	Amy	6 episodes
