= White Mars =

American science fiction film

- Directed by: Martin Owen; Lesley Manning
- Screenplay by: Matt Mitchell; Vicki Sargent; Roo Berry
- Produced by: Matt Williams; Neil Jones; Steve Griffith; Steve Jelley
- Starring: Lucy Hale; Luke Newton; Sam Hazeldine; Sabrina Dhowre
- Production companies: XYZ Films; Future Artists Entertainment; Singularity Entertainment
- Countries: United Kingdom; United States
- Language: English

White Mars is an upcoming science fiction film directed by Martin Owen & Lesley Manning, starring Lucy Hale and Luke Newton as leading cast.

== Premise ==
A malevolent entity infiltrates a research facility in Antarctica.

== Cast ==
- Lucy Hale as Sammie
- Luke Newton as Leo
- Sam Hazeldine as Alex
- Sabrina Dhowre

== Production ==
The film is directed by Martin Owen and Lesley Manning from a script by Matt Mitchell, Vicki Sargent, and Roo Berry. The film stars Lucy Hale and Luke Newton. Principal photography began in November 2024. Filming is at Cinecittà Studios in Rome and will be shot entirely in a virtual production environment. The London-based Future Artists Entertainment's Matt Williams is a producer alongside Neil Jones, and Steve Griffith and Steve Jelley from Singularity Entertainment. XYZ Films is co-financing with Singularity Entertainment.
