= Karen Ranney =

American novelist (1963–2020)

- Born: February 5, 1963; Albuquerque, New Mexico, U.S.
- Died: c. June 15, 2020
- Occupation: Novelist
- Writing career
- Period: 1995–2020
- Genre: Romance
- Website: karenranney.com

Karen Ranney (February 5, 1963 – June 15, 2020) was an American author of historical and paranormal romance novels.

== Biography ==
Ranney (pronounced Rain-ey) was the daughter of an Air Force officer and lived in places around the world, including Naples and Paris. She began writing when she was five. In first grade, she wrote a short story called "The Maple Leaf," which was chosen to be read over the school intercom.

After writing her first novel, Above All Others, Ranney found an agent. While her agent was trying to find a publisher willing to purchase the novel, Ranney continued writing, finishing Tapestry and beginning to write a third novel, A Promise of Love. Approximately three years after she had begun writing the first novel, Kensington agreed to purchase both of Ranney's completed works as well as the novel in progress.

Most of Ranney's novels are set in Scotland and feature "believable characters, careful plotting, and simmering sexual tension." She was nominated nine times for a Romantic Times Reviewers' Choice Award and won a Romantic Times Career Achievement Award in 2002 for British-set Historical Romance. In 2014 Ranney began writing the paranormal romance series The Montgomery Chronicles, which center on a newly and unwillingly turned female vampire, and in 2016 began writing a spinoff series, The Furry Chronicles.

Ranney's books have been on the USA Today Bestseller List as well as the New York Times Bestseller List.

On June 15, 2020, it was announced that Ranney had died. Her death was announced by her publisher, Avon Books.

== Works ==
=== Loved Series ===
1. My beloved (1999)
2. My true love (2000)

=== Highland Lords Series ===
1. One Man's Love (2001)
2. When the Laird Returns (2002)
3. The Irresistible MacRae (2002)
4. To Love a Scottish Lord (2003)
5. So in Love (2004)

=== The Montgomery Chronicles ===
1. The Fertile Vampire (2014)
2. The Reluctant Goddess (2015)
3. Pranic, Pregnant, and Petrified (2015)

=== The Furry Chronicles ===
1. The Lottery - Furry (2016)

=== The All For Love Series ===
1. To Love a Duchess (2018)
2. To Wed an Heiress (2019)
3. To Bed the Bride (2019)

=== Novels ===
- Tapestry (1995)
- Above All Others (1996)
- A Promise of Love (1997)
- My Wicked Fantasy (1998)
- Heaven Forbids (1998)
- Upon a Wicked Time (1998)
- After the Kiss (2000)
- Till Next We Meet (2005)
- Autumn in Scotland (2006)
- An Unlikely Governess (2006)
- The Scottish Companion (2007)
- The Devil Wears Tartan (2008)
- A Scotsman in Love (2009)
- Sold to a Laird (2009)
- A Highland Duchess (2010)
- A Borrowed Scot (2011)

=== Omnibus ===
- Angel Love (1996) (with Janice Bennett, Mallory Burgess, Elizabeth Graham, Constance Laux, Patricia McAllister, Doreen Owens Malek and John Scognamiglio)
- After Midnight (1998) (with Colleen Faulkner, Carol Finch)
- Scottish Brides (1999) (with Christina Dodd, Stephanie Laurens, Julia Quinn)

== See also ==
- List of romantic novelists
