= On the Way to the Wedding =

2006 historical romance novel by Julia Quinn

- First edition cover
- Author: Julia Quinn
- Language: English
- Series: Bridgerton series
- Genre: Fiction, Romance, Historical Fiction
- Publisher: Avon
- Publication date: June 27, 2006
- Publication place: United States
- Media type: Mass market paperback
- Pages: 371
- Preceded by: It's In His Kiss
- Followed by: The Bridgertons: Happily Ever After

On the Way to the Wedding is a 2006 historical romance written by Julia Quinn, published by Avon. It is the eighth and final novel of Quinn's Bridgerton series set in Regency England and tells the story of Gregory, the youngest male Bridgerton sibling.

It won the 2007 RITA Award for Best Long Historical Romance, and reached #5 in the New York Times Bestseller List and # 4 in the USA Today bestseller list.

== Background ==
Quinn noted that the title was derived from A Funny Thing Happened on the Way to the Forum. Some of the heroine's slightly obsessive-compulsive tendencies were taken directly from traits of Quinn and her husband.

== Plot ==
The hero of the novel is Gregory Bridgerton, the youngest male and last unmarried sibling in the Bridgerton family. After catching a glimpse of the "breathtakingly perfect curve of her neck" at a house party, Gregory falls immediately in love with the beautiful and extremely sought-after Hermione Watson. After he makes his attraction known, Hermione's best friend, the pretty-but-not-quite-as-attractive Lady Lucinda "Lucy" Abernathy informs him that Hermione is already in love, but with someone unsuitable - her father's secretary. Believing that Gregory is more sincere in his attempts to gain Hermione's favor than her other suitors, Lucy agrees to help him win Hermione's heart.

During the course of the house party, Lucy and Gregory become friends and then develop romantic feelings for each other. The author details Gregory's difficulty in determining whether his love for Lucy is real, or if it is simply an infatuation such as he felt for Hermione. Lucy is likewise given an inner conflict, as she is essentially engaged to Lord Haselby, an arranged match which she has already accepted.

After realizing he is in love with her, Gregory rushes to the church to stop Lucy's wedding to Haselby. Gregory arrives moments before the two exchange vows and confesses that he wants to marry Lucy. However, Lucy chooses to marry Haselby with a reason unknown to anyone but Lucy and her uncle.

After the wedding Gregory finds a way to speak with Lucy and eventually she tells him the truth. Lucy's uncle claims Haselby's father is blackmailing the family with proof that her deceased father was a traitor to England.

Now knowing the truth Gregory has to find a way to free Lucy from her marriage with Haselby. And it turns out it is the uncle who was the traitor. The marriage is annulled, and Lucy is free to marry Gregory. They go on to have nine children together.

== Reception ==
The Romance Writers of America named On the Way to the Wedding the 2007 RITA Award winner for Best Long Historical Romance. Romantic Times also nominated it for an award in 2006 in the category Historical Love & Laughter.

Kathe Robin of Romantic Times gave a rave review of the novel, remarking that "Quinn deftly merges the elements of a Shakespearean comedy with the climax of The Graduate, delivering an utterly delightful love story that will have readers grinning with pleasure the instant the book is opened until the marvelous ending." The review in Publishers' Weekly describes the novel as "as frothy and festive as a glass of bubbly, and more than worthy of a toast", but laments that the books does not include more interactions between the Bridgerton siblings, as previous books in the series had done.

On the Way to the Wedding reached number 5 on the New York Times Bestseller List for paperback fiction. The novel was on the USA Today bestseller list for six weeks, peaking at number 4.

== Adaptation ==
The book series the novel is a part of has been adapted by Shondaland and Netflix into a television series titled Bridgerton which premiered in 2020. Gregory is played by actor Will Tilston who has appeared in seasons 1-4.
