= Karen Hawkins (author) =

American author

Karen Hawkins (born Tennessee) is an American author of sixteen historical romance novels. Her novels are best known for their humorous theme.

== Biography ==
Hawkins was raised in Tennessee, where she lived with her parents, biological brother and sister, an adopted sister, numerous foster siblings and a number of foreign exchange students. It was not uncommon for 12-15 children to be living in the house at any one time.

Hawkins has a MS in political science, and spent time teaching political science at a small college in Georgia. Before she was published, she won RWA chapter and national contests for her work, allowing her to gain feedback and critiques from actual editors. With this feedback, she refined her craft, and sold her first book in 1998. She now publishes two books a year.

== Bibliography ==
=== Abduction & Seduction Series ===
- The Abduction of Julia (2000)
- A Belated Bride (2001)
- The Seduction of Sara (2001)

=== Talisman Ring Series ===
- An Affair to Remember (2002)
- Confessions of a Scoundrel (2003)
- How to Treat a Lady (2003)
- And the Bride Wore Plaid (2004)
- Lady in Red (2005)

=== Ask Reeves Series ===
- Her Master and Commander (2006)
- Her Officer and Gentleman (2006)

=== MacLean Curse Series ===
- How to Abduct a Highland Lord (2007)
- To Scotland, With Love (2007)
- To Catch a Highlander (2008)
- Sleepless In Scotland (2009)
- The Laird Who Loved Me (2009)

=== Prequel to the MacLean Curse series and The Hurst Amulet series ===
- Much Ado About Marriage (August, 2010)

=== Hurst Amulet Series ===
- One Night in Scotland (Nov, 2010)
- Scandal in Scotland (May, 2011)
- A Most Dangerous Profession (October, 2011)
- The Taming of a Scottish Princess (May, 2012)

=== Duchess Diaries Series ===
- How to Capture a Countess (September, 2012)
- How to Pursue a Princess (May, 2013)
- How to Entice an Enchantress (September, 2013)
- Princess in Disguise (e-novella) (February, 2013)

=== The Wicked Widows Short Stories (E-book only) ===
- The Lady in the Tower (December, 2013)
- The Lucky One (December, 2013)

=== The Princes of Oxenburg ===
- The Prince Who Loved Me (September, 2014)
- The Prince and I (2015)
- Mad for the Plaid (2016)
- The Princess Who Wore Plaid (2016)
- Twelve Kisses to Midnight (2016)

=== Dove Pond ===
- The Book Charmer (2019)
- A Cup of Silver Linings (2021)
- The Secret Recipe of Ella Dove (2023)
- The Bookshop of Hidden Dreams (2024)

=== Contemporary ===
- Talk of the Town (2008)
- Lois Lane Tells All (2010)

=== Single Novels ===
- Catherine and the Pirate (2002)

=== Anthologies ===
- The Further Observations of Lady Whistledown (2003) with Suzanne Enoch, Julia Quinn and Mia Ryan.
- Lady Whistledown Strikes Back (2004) with Suzanne Enoch, Julia Quinn and Mia Ryan.
