= Ton (society) =

Old term for English fashionable society

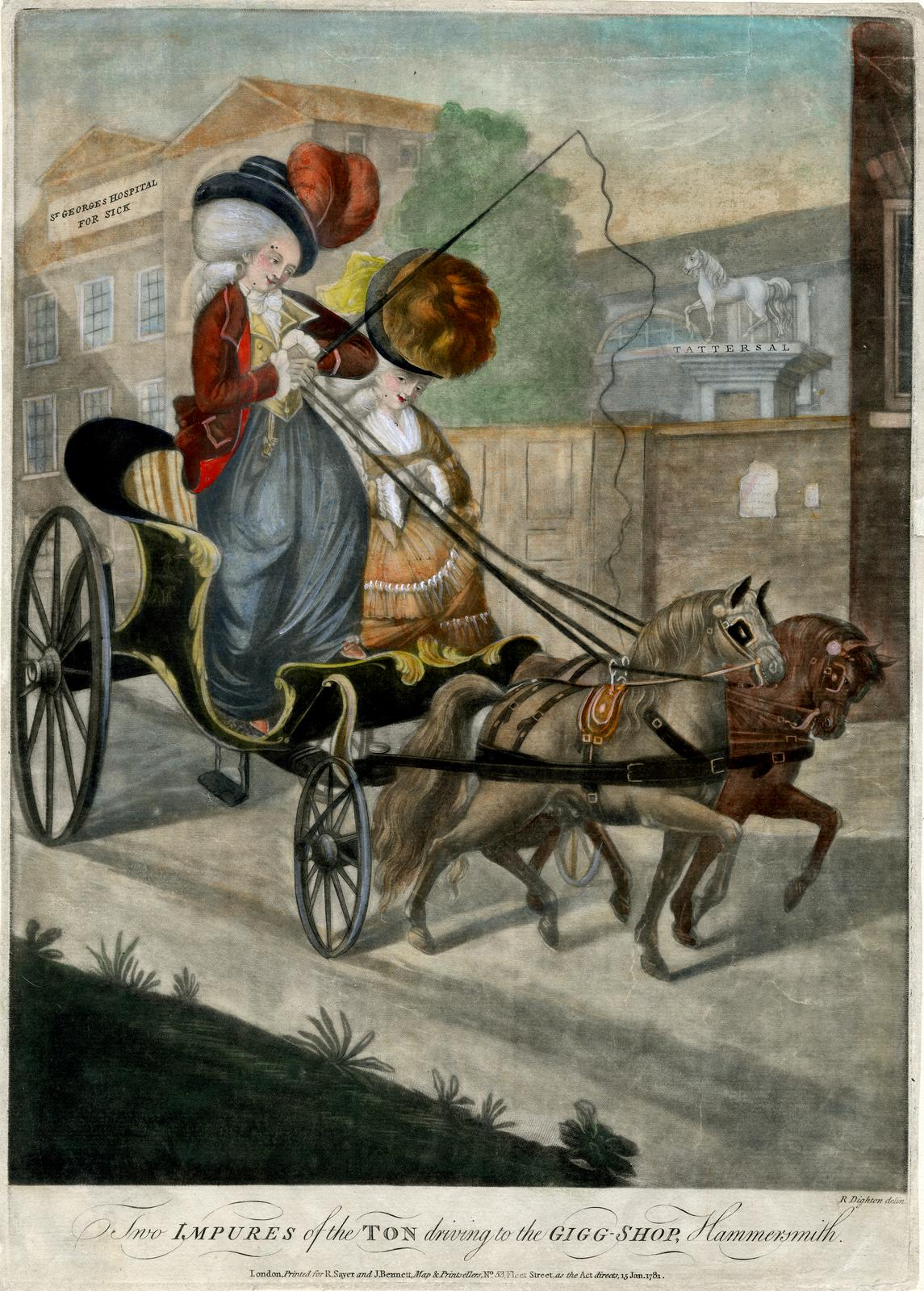
"Two Impures of the Ton driving to the Gigg Shop, Hammersmith", by Robert Dighton, 1781

Originally used in the context of upper class English society, ton meant the state of being fashionable, a fashionable manner or style, or something in vogue. It could also (generally with the definite article: the ton) mean people of fashion, or fashionable society generally (as in an expression "leaders of the ton and all high society"). A variant of the archaic French term bon-ton, designating good style or breeding, polite, fashionable or high society, or the fashionable world, ton's first recorded use in English was in 1769 according to the Oxford English Dictionary. In British English, the word is pronounced as in French /tɒ̃/, with American English favouring the Anglicised pronunciation /tɔn/ or /tɑn/.

Ton was a requirement for acceptance into English high society during the English Regency. As stated by Ellen Moers, "[w]ealth was no guarantee of admission ... Birth was no guarantee ... Beauty, talent, achievement, distinction—none of these meant anything unless qualified by that elusive term: ton". For example, in the early 1800s, the poor Irish poet Thomas Moore was quickly accepted, while the rich but vulgar nouveaux riches were being rejected, as were three quarters of the nobility. The word ton was widely used in fashionable publications with no precise definition, although the use of the French word for tone suggests the difficulty of "performing it". Indeed, the superiority of Beau Brummell in all things of fashion, acknowledged across Regency England, was said to be too exquisite to copy: "his power over others derived from subtleties of manner so fine they cannot be reproduced".

== Modern depictions ==
The ton in Regency England is constructed in Regency romances of Georgette Heyer, in particular in Sylvester, or the Wicked Uncle, as an entity that carefully builds and maintains polite society. Julia Quinn's 2000–2006 Bridgerton novel series also features the ton as a select social group. Some of her novels have been adapted as the streaming television series Bridgerton, the first season of which aired on Netflix in 2020.

== See also ==
- Brooks's
- Regency fashions
- White's

== Sources ==
- Hood, Edwin Paxton (1880). Vignettes of the Great Revival of the Eighteenth Century. London: Religious Tract Society.
- Moers, Ellen (1978). The Dandy: Brummell to Beerbohm. University of Nebraska Press. ISBN 978-0-8032-3052-1.
- Sherwood, Kim (25 February 2021). "Pride and prejudice: metafiction and the value of historical romance in Georgette Heyer". In Rayner, Samantha J.; Wilkins, Kim (eds.). Georgette Heyer, History and Historical Fiction (PDF). UCL Press. doi:10.14324/111.9781787357600. ISBN 978-1-78735-760-0.
- Weatherup, Elle Reynolds (2011). Understanding Dandyism in Three Acts: a Comparison of the Revolutionary Performances of Beau Brummell, George Walker, and Zoot Suit Culture (PDF) (Doctor of Philosophy in Literature thesis). UCSD.
