= The Secret Diaries of Miss Miranda Cheever =

2007 novel by Julia Quinn

The Secret Diaries of Miss Miranda Cheever is a historical romance novel written by Julia Quinn. It won the 2008 RITA Award for Best Regency Historical Romance and was nominated for Romantic Times 2007 Historical Romance of the Year. The novel reached number 3 on the New York Times Bestseller List and number 4 on the USA Today bestseller list.

== Background ==
The Secret Diaries of Miss Miranda Cheever was written by Julia Quinn and published by Avon Publications on June 26, 2007. It was Quinn's first novel in eight years that did not feature characters from the Bridgerton family. The novel is a quintessential Regency romance. The novel is the first in a trilogy Quinn calls The Bevelstoke Series.

According to her website, Quinn first wrote the novel in 1994, just after she sold her first novel, Splendid. In 2007, she spent two or three months revising the manuscript. Some scenes, including the prologue, are fairly untouched from the original version, while others, including chapter one, are completely new.

== Plot summary ==
In the prologue, set in March 1810, the heroine, Miranda Cheever, is ten years old. After being insulted while at a birthday party for her best friend Olivia Bevelstoke, Miranda is escorted home by Olivia's adult brother Nigel, Viscount Turner. He is kind to her, and she promptly decides she is in love with him. At his advice, she begins keeping a diary of her thoughts.

The main body of the story is set ten years later, beginning with the funeral for Nigel's unfaithful and shrewish wife. That evening, the hero and heroine have a chance encounter and conversation. They discover they are able to communicate their deeper thoughts to the other quite easily, and at the end of the conversation Nigel kisses Miranda for the first time.

The action progresses when Miranda accompanies Olivia to London for the Season, where she will thus see Nigel more often. As they get to know each other better, Miranda realizes she now has an adult love for Nigel. She cycles between hope that he will love her in return and despair that he feels nothing but friendship for her, especially considering she is not a raving beauty. Nigel considers Miranda a very good friend and does not really consider the possibility that he might have deeper feelings for her.

== Reception ==
The novel was well received within the industry. The book garnered Quinn the Romance Writers of America's 2008 RITA Award for Best Regency Historical Romance, her second consecutive year of winning the most prestigious award in the romance novel industry. Romantic Times also nominated The Secret Diaries of Miss Miranda Cheever for its 2007 Historical Romance of the Year.

In her book The Power of Point of View: Make Your Story Come to Life, Alicia Rasley uses The Secret Diaries of Miss Miranda Cheever as an example of choosing the point-of-view of the character with the most at risk. Focusing on the scene where the hero buries his first wife, Rasley notes that choosing to show his perspective instead of the heroine's not only gives the reader the sense of mourning felt by funeral attendees, it also allows the author to give a deeper insight into his personal emotional conflict, making the story even more emotionally wrenching.

In Romantic Times, Kathe Robin described the novel as "both delightful and emotional". A Publishers' Weekly review praises the more in-depth characterization Quinn gives to the secondary characters of the hero's siblings, but chides the author for relying on stereotypes for some of the other secondary characters, such as the heroine's father, a scholar too wrapped up in his work to pay adequate attention to her. The review noted that despite being somewhat "stale", the book was redeemed by "pitch-perfect humor" and a "well-written ... and occasionally tender romance."

The novel reached number 3 on the New York Times Bestseller List for paperback fiction. It spent seven weeks on the USA Today bestseller list, peaking at number 4.
