= Celeste Bradley =

American author of romance novels

- Born: 1964 (age 61–62)
- Occupation: Novelist
- Writing career
- Period: 2001–present
- Genre: romance
- Website: www.celestebradley.com

Celeste Bradley (born 1964) is an American romance novelist.

== Bibliography ==
=== Single novels ===
- Fallen (2001)

=== The Wicked Worthingtons ===
1. When She Said I Do (2013)
2. And Then Comes Marriage (2013)
3. With This Ring (2014)
4. I Thee Wed (2016)
5. Wedded Bliss (2017)
6. On Bended Knee (2019)

=== The Liar's Club ===
1. The Pretender (2003)
2. The Impostor (2003)
3. The Spy (2004)
4. The Charmer (2004)
5. The Rogue (2005)
6. Wedding Knight (2024) (novella)

=== The Royal Four ===
1. To Wed a Scandalous Spy (2005)
2. Surrender to a Wicked Spy (2005)
3. One Night with a Spy (2006)
4. Seducing the Spy (2006)

=== The Heiress Brides ===
1. Desperately Seeking A Duke (2008)
2. The Duke Next Door (2008)
3. Duke Most Wanted (2008)

=== The Runaway Brides ===
1. Devil in My Bed (2009)
2. Rogue in My Arms (2010)
3. Scoundrel in My Dreams (2010)

Haven Holiday

1. Sleepless in Staffordshire (2017)
2. While You Were Dreaming (2019)

Vauxhall Vixens

1. A Liar Under The Mistletoe (2020)

Courtesans

1. A Courtesan’s Guide to Getting Your Man (2011) with Susan Donovan (rereleased as "Unbound" (2012))
2. Breathless (2018)

=== Anthologies ===
- My Scandalous Bride (2004) with Christina Dodd, Stephanie Laurens, and Leslie LaFoy
