= Stephanie Laurens =

Australian writer

- Born: 14 August 1953 (age 73); Ceylon, Sri Lanka
- Occupation: Novelist
- Writing career
- Period: 1992–present
- Genre: historical romance
- Notable work: The Fall of Rogue Gerard in It Happened One Night
- Notable awards: RITA award – Romance Novella; 2009 The Fall of Rogue Gerard in It Happened One Night
- Website: stephanielaurens.com

Stephanie Laurens (born in Ceylon, now Sri Lanka), is an Australian author of romance novels. She is a winner of a Romance Writers of America RITA Award.

== Biography ==
Stephanie Laurens was born on 14 August 1953 in Sri Lanka. When she was 5, her family moved to Melbourne, where she was raised. After continuing through school and earning a PhD in Biochemistry in Australia, Laurens and her husband moved to Great Britain.

Once in London, Laurens and her husband both began work as research scientists in Kent.

After four years in England, Laurens and her husband returned to Australia, where she continued to work in cancer research, eventually heading her own research laboratory. One evening she realised that she did not have any more of her favourite romance novels to read, and wrote her first book, Tangled Reins. She became a full-time novelist. Her novels are primarily historical romances set in the Regency time period.

Stephanie Laurens and her husband live in Melbourne with their two cats.

== Bibliography ==
=== Regency Tangled Series (also published as The Regency Collection Volume 1) ===
1. Tangled Reins (1992) *also published in A Season for Scandal (2001)
2. Four in Hand (1993) *also published in Regency Revels and Regency Romps (1994)
3. Impetuous Innocent (1994) *also published in Regency Revels
4. Fair Juno (1994) *also published in A Season for Scandal (2001)

=== Lester Family Saga Series ===
1. The Reasons for Marriage (Jason, Lenore) (1994) *also published in Rogues' Reform (2000); A Season for Marriage (2004)
2. A Lady of Expectations (Jack, Sophie) (1995) *also published in Rogues' Reform (2000); A Season for Marriage (2004)
3. An Unwilling Conquest (Harry, Lucinda) (1996) *also published in Rogues' Reform (2000); A Convenient Marriage (1996); A Suitable Marriage (2004)
4. A Comfortable Wife (Philip, Antonia) (1997) *also published in A Convenient Marriage (1996); A Suitable Marriage (2004)

=== Bastion Club Series ===
1. (prequel) Captain Jack's Woman (Jack, Kit) (1997)
2. The Lady Chosen (Tristan, Leonora) (2003)
3. A Gentleman's Honor (Tony, Alicia) (2003)
4. A Lady of His Own (Charles, Penny) (2004)
5. A Fine Passion (Jack, Clarice) (2005)
6. To Distraction (Deverell, Phoebe) (2006)
7. Beyond Seduction (Gervase, Madeline) (2007)
8. The Edge of Desire (Christian, Leticia) (2008)
9. Mastered by Love (Royce, Minerva) (July 2009) *finale, traitor revealed

=== The Cynster Novels (first generation) ===
1. Devil's Bride (Devil, Honoria) (1998)
2. A Rake's Vow (Vane, Patience) (1998)
3. Scandal's Bride(Scandal, Catriona) (1999)
4. A Rogue's Proposal (Demon, Flick)
5. A Secret love (Gabriel, Alathea) (1999)
6. All About Love (Lucifer, Phyllida) (2001)
7. All About Passion (Gyles, Francesca) (2001)
8. The Promise in a Kiss (Sebastian, Helena) (2001) *Prequel
9. On a Wild Night (Amanda, Martin) (2002)
10. On a Wicked Dawn (Amelia, Luc) (2002)
11. The Perfect Lover (Simon, Portia) (2003)
12. The Ideal Bride (Michael, Caro) (2004)
13. The Truth about Love (Gerrard, Jacqueline) (2005)
14. What Price Love? (Dillon, Pris) (2006)
15. The Taste of Innocence (Charlie, Sarah) (2007)
16. Where the Heart Leads (Barnaby, Penelope) (2008)
17. Temptation and Surrender (Jonas, Emily) (2009)

=== The Cynster Sisters Trilogy ===
1. Viscount Breckenridge to the Rescue (Heather, Breckenridge) (2010)
2. In Pursuit of Eliza Cynster (Eliza, Jeremy) (2011)
3. The Capture of the Earl of Glencrae (Angelica, Glencrae) (2012)

=== The Cynster Sisters Duo ===
1. And Then She Fell (Henrietta, James) (2013)
2. The Taming of Ryder Cavanaugh (Mary, Ryder) (2013)

=== Cynsters Next Generation ===
1. By Winter's Light (prequel/special) (Claire, Daniel) (2014)
2. The Tempting of Thomas Carrick (Lucilla, Thomas) (2015)
3. A Match for Marcus Cynster (Marcus, Niniver) (2015)
4. A Conquest Impossible to Resist (Prudence, Deaglan) (2019)
5. The Inevitable Fall of Christopher Cynster (Christopher, Ellen) (2020)
6. The Games Lovers Play (Devlin, Therese) (2021)
7. The Secrets of Lord Grayson Child (Gray, Isadora) (2021)
8. Foes, Friends, and Lovers (Gregory, Caitlin) (2022)
9. The Time For Love (Martin, Sophia) (2022)
10. Miss Flibbertigibbet and The Barbarian (Nicholas, Addie) (2023)
11. Miss Prim and the Duke of Wylde (Meg, Drago) (2023)
12. A Family Of His Own (Toby, Diana) (2024)

=== Devil's Brood Trilogy ===
1. The Lady by His Side (Sebastian, Antonia) (2017)
2. An Irresistible Alliance (Michael, Cleome) (2017)
3. The Greatest Challenge of Them All (Louisa, Drake) (2017)

=== The Casebook of Barnaby Adair Novels ===
1. The Truth about Love (Gerrard, Jacqueline) (2005) (also listed as Cynster 13) *Prequel
2. Where The Heart Leads (Penelope, Barnaby) (2008) (also listed as Cynster 16)
3. The Peculiar Case of Lord Finsbury's Diamonds (2014)
4. The Masterful Mr. Montague (Violet, Heathcote) (2014)
5. The Curious Case of Lady Latimer's Shoes (2014)
6. Loving Rose: The Redemption of Malcolm Sinclair (Rose, Malcolm) (2014)
7. The Confounding Case of the Carisbrook Emeralds (Hugo, Cara) (2018)
8. The Murder of Mandeville Hall (Alaric, Constance) (2018)
9. The Meriwell Legacy (David, Veronica) (2024)
10. Dead Beside The Thames (Charlie, ?) (2024)
11. Marriage and Murder (Henry, Madeline) (2025)
12. The Murder of Thomas Cardwell (Jordan, Ruth) (2025)
13. The Curse of Ill-Gotten Gains (Richard, Rosalind) (2025)

=== Lady Osbaldestone's Christmas Chronicles ===
1. Lady Osbaldestone's Christmas Goose (2017)
2. Lady Osbaldestone and the Missing Christmas Carols (2018)
3. Lady Osbaldestone's Plum Puddings (2019)
4. Lady Osbaldestone's Christmas Intrigue (2020)
5. The Meaning of Love (2021)

=== The Cavanaughs ===
1. The Designs of Lord Randolph Cavanaugh (Randolph, Felicia) (2018)
2. The Pursuits of Lord Kit Cavanaugh (Kit, Sylvia) (2019)
3. The Beguilement of Lady Eustacia Cavanaugh (Frederick, Stacie) (2019)
4. The Obsessions of Lord Godfrey Cavanaugh (Godfrey, Elinor) (2020)

=== Black Cobra Quartet Series ===
1. The Untamed Bride (Derek, Deliah) (2009)
2. The Elusive Bride (Gareth, Emily) (2010)
3. The Brazen Bride (Logan, Linnet) (2010)
4. The Reckless Bride (Rafe, Loretta) (26 October 2010)

=== Adventurers Quartet (Frobisher Family) ===
1. The Lady's Command (Delan, Edwina) (2015)
2. A Buccaneer at Heart (Robert, Aileen) (2016)
3. The Daredevil Snared (Caleb, Katherine) (2016)
4. Lord of the Privateers (Royd, Isobel) (2016)

=== Other Novels ===
1. The Lady Risks All (Neville, Miranda) (2012) *Characters connected to The Edge of Desire; The Reckless Bride; The Lady's Command
2. Desire's Prize (Montisfryn, Eloise) (2013)
3. 1750: Jaqueline (Richard, Jaqueline) (2018) *2nd in the Legend of Nimway Hall series

=== Novellas, Shorts & Anthologies ===
1. Melting Ice (Dyan, Fiona) (1998) *Originally published in Rough Around the Edges (with Dee Holmes, Susan Johnson and Eileen Wilks) and Scandalous Brides (with Celeste Bradley, Christina Dodd and Leslie LaFoy)
2. Regency Collection Volume 5 (1999) (with Paula Marshall)
3. The Regency Collection 8 (1999) (with Sylvia Andrew)
4. Rose In Bloom (Duncan, Rose) (1999) *Originally published in Scottish Brides (with Christina Dodd, Julia Quinn and Karen Ranney)
5. Scandalous Lord Dere (Adrian, Abigail) (2000) *Originally published in Secrets of a Perfect Night (with Victoria Alexander and Rachel Gibson)
6. Lost and Found (Reggie, Anne) (2005) *Originally published in Hero, Come Back (with Elizabeth Boyle and Christina Dodd)
7. The Fall of Rogue Gerrard (Ro, Lydia) (2008) *Originally published in It Happened One Night
8. The Seduction of Sebastion Trantor (Sebastion, Tabitha) (2011) *Originally published in It Happened One Season (with Mary Balogh; Jacquie D'Alessandro; and Candice Hern)
9. The Wedding Planner (Gaston, Margaret) (2011) *Originally published in Royal Weddings (with Loretta Chase and Gaelen Foley)
10. Return Engagement (Robert, Nell) (2012) *Originally published in Royal Bridesmaids (with Loretta Chase and Gaelen Foley)

== Awards and reception ==
- 2009 - Romance Writers of America RITA Award, Romance Novella – The Fall of Rogue Gerard in It Happened One Night
