= Inheritance (2025 film) =

American action film

- Theatrical release poster
- Directed by: Neil Burger
- Screenplay by: Neil Burger; Olen Steinhauer
- Produced by: Neil Burger; Bill Block; Charles Miller
- Starring: Phoebe Dynevor; Rhys Ifans
- Cinematography: Jackson Hunt
- Edited by: Nick Carew
- Music by: Paul Leonard-Morgan
- Production companies: Miramax; Nota Bene Productions
- Distributed by: IFC Films
- Release date: January 24, 2025
- Running time: 101 minutes
- Country: United States
- Language: English
- Box office: $318,090

Inheritance is a 2025 American spy thriller film directed by Neil Burger from a screenplay he co-wrote with Olen Steinhauer starring Phoebe Dynevor and Rhys Ifans. The film was released in theaters on January 24, 2025. It received mixed reviews from critics.

== Premise ==
A young woman is drawn into an international conspiracy after discovering her father is a spy.

== Cast ==
- Rhys Ifans as Sam
- Phoebe Dynevor as Maya
- Ciara Baxendale as Emily
- Necar Zadegan as Erika Papp
- Kersti Bryan as Jess
- Daniel Joey Albright as US Customs Officer
- Mitchell Hochman as Bartender
- Majd Eid as Khalil Jamal
- Byron Clohessy as Doug
- Salim Siddiqui as Taxi Driver
- José Alvarez as Cashier

== Production ==
The script was co-written by Neil Burger and Olen Steinhauer, with Burger directing. The film is produced by Bill Block and Charles Miller, alongside Burger. The film was developed from an idea that Burger had during the COVID-19 pandemic and is international in scope, but was filmed entirely on an iPhone. Burger has described using an "experimental style of shooting" in which there "was no wait time for camera set- ups, no makeup checks, or rehearsals. We’d arrive at the location and then immediately shoot as much as we could in the time that we had. It enabled us to travel with a small crew".

The cast includes Phoebe Dynevor, Rhys Ifans, Ciara Baxendale and Kersti Bryan and also includes Daniel Joey Albright, Mitchell Hochman, Majd Eid, Byron Clohessy, Salim Siddiqui and José Alvarez.

Principal photography took place in New York City, Delhi, Seoul and Cairo in mid-2022.

== Release ==
The film was released in the United States on January 24, 2025. It made $124,817 in its opening weekend.

== Reception ==
On the review aggregator website Rotten Tomatoes, 55% of 47 critics' reviews are positive, with an average rating of 5.7/10. The website's consensus reads: "A globetrotting thriller shot guerilla style, Inheritance is watchable enough but proves more interesting for how it was made than what winds up on the screen." Metacritic, which uses a weighted average, assigned the film a score of 55 out of 100, based on 12 critics, indicating "mixed or average" reviews.
