= The Secrets of Sir Richard Kenworthy =

Novel by Julia Quinn

- First edition (US)
- Author: Julia Quinn
- Language: English
- Genre: Regency romance
- Published: January 2015
- Publisher: Avon Books (US); Piatkus (UK)
- Publication place: USA
- Media type: Paperback, audio CD, ebook
- ISBN: 978-0-06-237021-1

The Secrets of Sir Richard Kenworthy is a Regency romance written by Julia Quinn and published in 2015 by Avon Books. Quinn's 24th novel is also the final installment of her series known as the Smythe-Smith Quartet. It features Iris Smythe-Smith and the eponymous Sir Richard Kenworthy. The novel reached number 2 on the New York Times Bestseller List and was in the top 10 for the USA Today bestseller list.

== Background ==
Julia Quinn is one of only 15 writers inducted into the Romance Writers of America's Hall of Fame. She specializes in Regency romances, and her novels share a fictional universe. Characters from one novel are often mentioned in others.

Her twenty-fourth novel, The Secrets of Sir Richard Kenworthy, is the fourth and final book in Julia Quinn's Smythe-Smith Quartet. The series features participants in the annual musicale hosted by members of the Smythe-Smith family. The musicale, often described in prior books as an assault on the ears, had been mentioned in multiple Quinn books, beginning with her third novel, Minx. According to Julia Quinn's website, the opening scene of this novel also appeared in her novel It's In His Kiss, as well as the previous books in this series, Just Like Heaven, A Night Like This, and The Sum of All Kisses.

Unlike the prior three novels in this quartet, The Secrets of Sir Richard Kenworthy did not focus on the effects of a duel which occurred before the setting of the first novel. Quinn does carry through other plot points from the first three books, notably the unicorn obsession of Lady Frances. The novel was released at the end of January 2015 by Avon.

== Plot summary ==
The novel opens in 1825 London, at the annual Smythe-Smith musicale. After seeing Iris Smythe-Smith perform, Sir Richard Kenworthy finagles an introduction and begins a flirtation. After only a week's courtship, he proposes. Although she likes him, Iris is unused to attention from men and is slightly suspicious of his haste. She asks for more time to decide.

The reader is informed that Sir Richard needs wife immediately. He maneuvers Iris into a compromising position, knowing her family will force them to marry to save her reputation. Iris is fairly upset. She wanted to marry Richard, but she neither understands nor approves of his attempt to coerce her into the agreement. After the wedding, Sir Richard uses a series of excuses to postpone consummating the marriage, to Iris's dismay.

Once the couple arrive at Richard's home in Yorkshire, he begins to court her again. The author makes it clear that Richard has come to care for Iris, that he feels guilty for manipulating her, but that his courtship is designed to make her fall in love with him so that she will not leave when she discovers his secret. As the novel progresses, Iris becomes increasingly confused, as it is obvious that something is amiss but no one will tell her what. Eventually, Iris discovers that Sir Richard's eldest sister Fleur is pregnant, and he intends to pass her child off as theirs, thus saving Fleur's reputation. Although initially horrified by the plan, Iris eventually agrees to participate. The plan is nullified when Iris learns that Fleur has an additional secret; that knowledge allows Iris to find a solution to the situation that makes all of the characters happy.

== Reception ==
Writing for Kirkus, Bobbi Dumas noted that in the Smythe-Smith Quartet Quinn has maintained her "signature bright, buoyant voice" while still exploring darker themes. In Booklist, John Charles wrote that the novel showcases Quinn's "sparkling wit" and includes enough "seductive passion to create another swoon-worthy love story".

The novel reached number 2 on the New York Times Bestseller List the week of February 15, 2015, and was in the top 10 of the USA Today bestsellers.
