= Regé-Jean Page =

British actor (born 1988)

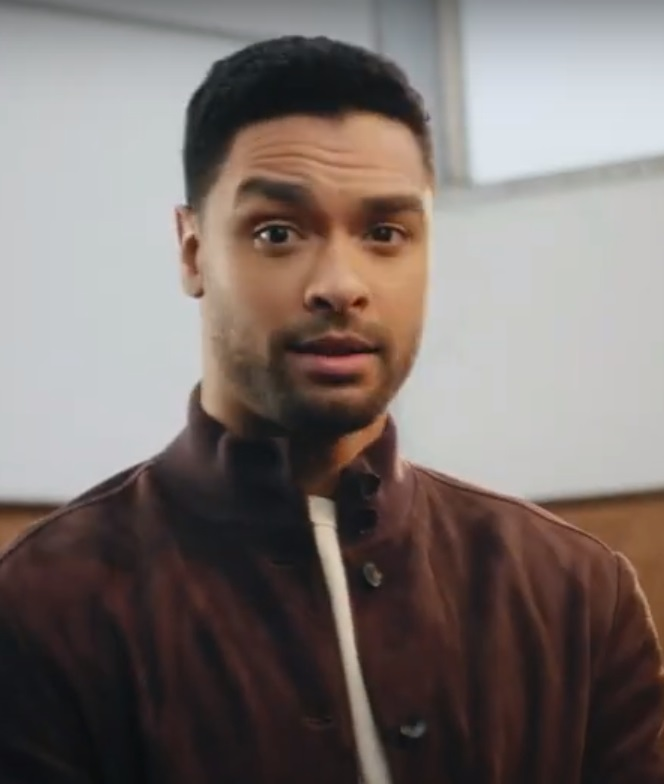
- Page in 2023
- Born: 24 January 1988 or 27 April 1988 (age 38); London, England
- Education: Drama Centre London
- Occupation: Actor
- Years active: 2001–present
- Partner: Emily Brown (2019–present)

Regé-Jean Page (/ˌrɛɡeɪ ˈʒɒ̃ ˈpeɪdʒ/ REG-ay ... PAYJ; born 24 January or 27 April 1988) is a British-Zimbabwean actor best known for his role in the first season of Netflix's period drama Bridgerton in 2020. He has also appeared in the series Waterloo Road (2015) on BBC One, Roots (2016) on History, and For the People (2018–2019) on ABC, and has since had roles in the action film The Gray Man (2022), the fantasy film Dungeons & Dragons: Honor Among Thieves (2023), and the spy caper Black Bag (2025).

== Early life and education ==
Regé-Jean Page was born in London to an English preacher father and a Zimbabwean nurse mother from Harare. He spent his childhood in Harare, before moving back to United Kingdom, where he took up acting as a hobby in his teen years.

He and his brother, Tose, formed a band together in their early years and worked as a duo named Tunya.

Page studied sound engineering at the Northern Technical College. After two years of auditioning, he matriculated at Drama Centre London.

== Career ==
=== Beginnings (2001–2019) ===
Page's first acting role was in 2001 playing Tanaka in television series Gimme 6. This was followed by guest appearances in British television series Casualty@Holby City in 2005, Fresh Meat in 2013, and Waterloo Road in 2015. On stage, he had roles in theatre productions of The History Boys in 2013, and The Merchant of Venice in 2015. Page made his American production debut playing the role of Chicken George in the History Channel miniseries Roots in 2016, a remake of the 1977 miniseries with the same name which is based on Alex Haley's 1976 novel, Roots: The Saga of an American Family. The same year, Page filmed an unaired pilot episode for ABC's Spark.

In 2017, he was cast in a supporting role in the Shondaland-produced legal drama For the People which ran for two seasons, before getting cancelled by ABC in 2019. On film, he had minor roles in the post-apocalyptic film Mortal Engines in 2018 and drama film Sylvie's Love in 2020.

=== Breakthrough with Bridgerton (2020–2021) ===
In 2019, Page was cast as one of the leads in the first season of Netflix period drama Bridgerton, another Shondaland project. It is based on the Regency romance novel The Duke and I and was released in December 2020. The show was a critical success and Page received an NAACP Image Award for Outstanding Actor in a Drama Series presented by the National Association for the Advancement of Colored People, with Time magazine including him in their 100 Next List in 2021. He was also nominated for a Primetime Emmy for the role. Page did not return for the show's second season despite being offered to come back as he initially only signed a one-series deal, and wanted to explore other opportunities outside the show.

=== Film roles (2022–present) ===
In 2022, Page appeared in Netflix's film The Gray Man which received mixed reviews. David Ehrlich of IndieWire described Page as "miserable in the role of a gallingly basic villain", with the BBC's Nicholas Barber calling his performance "one-dimensionally evil". The same year, he was made the face of Armani Code. Page played a character in the fantasy film Dungeons & Dragons: Honor Among Thieves (2023) which received positive reviews but was deemed a "box-office bomb".

In 2025, Page appeared in Steven Soderbergh's Focus Features thriller Black Bag. He starred opposite Halle Bailey in the film You, Me & Tuscany for Universal Pictures and by Will Packer Productions.

== Personal life ==
Page has been in a relationship with Emily Brown since 2019.

== Filmography ==
Key
†	Denotes films that have not yet been released

=== Film ===
Year	Title	Role	Notes	Ref.
2004	Troublemaker	Jayu	Short film	
2010	Harry Potter and the Deathly Hallows – Part 1	Wedding guest	Uncredited	
2015	Survivor	Robert Purvell		
2016	Second Summer of Love	Rupert	Short film	
2016	The Merchant of Venice	Solanio	Filmed stage production	
2018	Mortal Engines	Captain Khora		
2020	Don't Wait	Performer	Also producer; short film	
2020	Sylvie's Love	Chico Sweetney		
2022	The Gray Man	Denny Carmichael		
2023	Dungeons & Dragons: Honor Among Thieves	Xenk Yendar		
2025	Black Bag	Col. James Stokes		
2026	You, Me & Tuscany	Michael Costa		

=== Television ===
Year	Title	Role	Notes	Ref.
2001	Gimme 6	Tanaka		
2005	Casualty@Holby City	Daniel Kimpton	Episode: "Teacher's Pet / Crash and Burn"	
2013	Fresh Meat	Dean	2 episodes	
2015	Waterloo Road	Guy Braxton	8 episodes (series 10)	
2016	Roots	Chicken George	Miniseries	
2016	Spark	Alex Lavelle	Unaired TV pilot	
2018–2019	For the People	Leonard Knox	20 episodes	
2020	Cinderella: A Comic Relief Pantomime for Christmas	Prince Charming	BBC Christmas Special	
2020	Bridgerton	Simon Basset, Duke of Hastings	Main role (series 1)	
2021	Saturday Night Live	Himself (host)	Episode: "Regé-Jean Page / Bad Bunny"	
2022	Surviving Paradise: A Family Tale	Narrator	Documentary	
2026	Saturday Night Live UK	Underwear Shopper	Episode: "Tina Fey/Wet Leg"	

=== Theatre ===
Year	Title	Role	Notes	Ref.
2013	The History Boys	Crowther	Crucible Theatre, Sheffield	
2015	The Merchant of Venice	Solanio	Shakespeare's Globe, London	

=== Audio ===
Year	Title	Role	Notes	Ref.
2020	The Harrowing	Major Tanner	Podcast series	
2021	The Sandman: Act II	Orpheus	Audio drama	
2021	The Prince and the Naturalist	Narrator	Calm	
2022	The Sandman: Act III	Orpheus	Audio drama	

== Awards and nominations ==
Year	Award	Category	Nominated work	Result	Ref.
2017	National Association for Multi-ethnicity in Communications (NAMIC) Vision Awards	Best Performance – Drama	Roots	Nominated	
2021	Black Reel Awards	Outstanding Guest Actor, Comedy Series	Saturday Night Live	Nominated	
2021	Black Reel Awards	Outstanding Actor, Drama Series	Bridgerton	Nominated	
2021	IMDb STARmeter Awards	Breakout Star	Bridgerton	Won	
2021	Hollywood Critics Association TV Awards	Best Actor in a Streaming Series, Drama	Bridgerton	Nominated	
2021	MTV Movie & TV Awards	Breakthrough Performance	Bridgerton	Won	
2021	MTV Movie & TV Awards	Best Kiss (w/ Phoebe Dynevor)	Bridgerton	Nominated	
2021	National Association for the Advancement of Colored People (NAACP) Image Awards	Outstanding Actor in a Drama Series	Bridgerton	Won	
2021	Primetime Emmy Awards	Outstanding Lead Actor In A Drama Series	Bridgerton	Nominated	
2021	Satellite Awards	Best Actor – Television Series Drama	Bridgerton	Nominated	
2021	Screen Actors Guild Awards	Outstanding Performance by a Male Actor in a Drama Series	Bridgerton	Nominated	
2021	Screen Actors Guild Awards	Outstanding Performance by an Ensemble in a Drama Series	Bridgerton	Nominated	
