= Julia Quinn =

American author (born 1970)

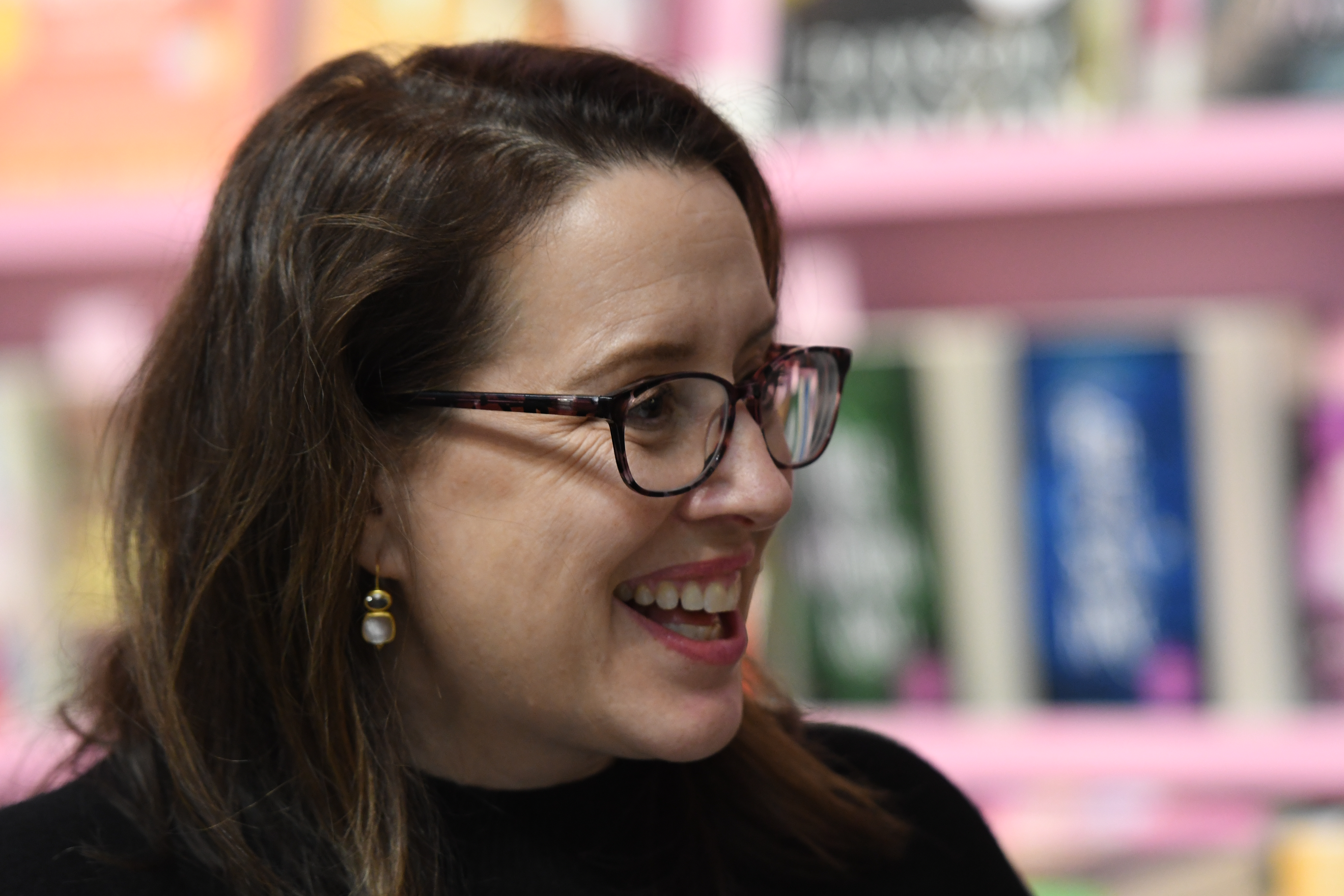
- Quinn in 2025
- Born: Julie Cotler; January 12, 1970 (age 56); United States
- Occupation: Author
- Spouse: Paul Pottinger
- Children: 2
- Writing career
- Pen name: Julia Quinn
- Period: 1994–present
- Genre: Historical romance
- Website: juliaquinn.com

Julie Pottinger (née Cotler; born January 12, 1970), better known by her pen name, Julia Quinn, is an American author. Her novels have been translated into 41 languages and have appeared on The New York Times Bestseller List nineteen times. She has been inducted into the Romance Writers of America Hall of Fame. Her Bridgerton book series has been adapted for Netflix into a television series of the same name.

== Early life and education ==
Quinn was born as Julie Cotler in 1970 to Jane and Stephen Lewis Cotler. She has three sisters: Emily, Abigail, and Ariana. She is Jewish. She was raised primarily in New England, although she spent much of her time in California after the divorce of her parents.

Quinn's favorite books as a child included the Sweet Dreams and the Sweet Valley High series, which inspired her to begin writing at age 12.

Quinn graduated from the Hotchkiss School and Harvard University with a bachelor's degree in History of Art. During her senior year of college, she decided to become a doctor. She was accepted to Yale School of Medicine but deferred her entrance for two years to focus on writing novels.

== Career ==
While she was a student, Quinn began to write light-hearted Regency novels. Her then-fiancé’s father, novelist John Stanley Pottinger, helped to get her manuscript into the right hands. A few weeks after her acceptance to medical school, she discovered that her first two novels, Splendid and Dancing At Midnight, had been sold at auction, an unusual occurrence for a new romance author. By the time Quinn entered medical school, three of her books had been published. She left medical school after two months to become a full-time writer.

Quinn considers herself a feminist and gives her heroines feminist qualities that are not necessarily true to the most prevalent attitudes of the times her novels are set in. Her novels are primarily character-driven and have been noted for their humor and sharp, witty dialogue. Most of her books are dedicated to her husband, Paul Pottinger, often with references to amusing alternate titles for the work.

In 2003, she was profiled in Time Magazine, an accomplishment few romance novelists have achieved. In 2005, Publishers Weekly gave To Sir Phillip, With Love a rare starred review, and later, the novel was named as one of the six best mass market original novels of the year.

Quinn won the Romance Writers of America RITA Award, in 2007, for On the Way to the Wedding and again, in 2008, for The Secret Diaries of Miss Miranda Cheever. At the time of her 2010 RITA award for What Happens in London, she became RWA's youngest member. She is one of only 16 authors to be inducted into the RWA Hall of Fame.

Many of Quinn's novels have appeared on the New York Times Bestseller List, with Mr. Cavendish, I Presume hitting number one in October 2008. In addition, both her Lady Whistledown anthologies appeared on the NY Times list, as did both of her novel-in-three-part collaborations with Connie Brockway and Eloisa James (The Lady Most Likely and The Lady Most Willing), and the Bridgertons: Happily Ever After collection of Bridgerton's second epilogues.

Her Bridgerton series of books has been adapted for Netflix by Shonda Rhimes, under the title Bridgerton.

== Personal life ==
In 2001, Quinn won $79,000 on The Weakest Link. She is an avid reader and posts recommendations of her favorite books on her Facebook page.

Quinn resides in Seattle, Washington, with her husband, infectious disease specialist Paul Pottinger, and two children.

On June 29, 2021, Quinn's sister and father, Ariana Elise Cotler and Stephen Lewis Cotler, were killed by a drunk driver in Kaysville, Utah.

== Bibliography ==
Publications
May 1, 1995	Splendid	ISBN: 9780380780747
December 1, 1995	Dancing At Midnight	ISBN: 9780380780754
September 1, 1996	Minx	ISBN: 9780380785629
March 1, 1997	Everything and The Moon	ISBN: 9780380789337
December 1, 1997	Brighter Than the Sun	ISBN: 9780380789344
July 1, 1998	To Catch an Heiress	ISBN: 9780380789351
March 9, 1999	How to Marry a Marquis	ISBN: 9780380800810
June 1, 1999	Scottish Brides	ISBN: 9780380804511
January 5, 2000	The Duke and I	ISBN: 9780062353597
December 1, 2000	The Viscount Who Loved Me	ISBN: 9780062353641
July 3, 2001	An Offer from a Gentleman	ISBN: 9780062353658
July 2, 2002	Romancing Mister Bridgerton	ISBN: 9780062353689
January 28, 2003	The Further Observations of Lady Whistledown	ISBN: 9780060511500
June 24, 2003	To Sir Phillip, With Love	ISBN: 9780062353733
September 1, 2003	Where's My Hero?	ISBN: 9780060505240
April 27, 2004	Lady Whistledown Strikes Back	ISBN: 9780060577483
June 29, 2004	When He Was Wicked	ISBN: 9780062353788
June 28, 2005	It's In His Kiss	ISBN: 9780062353795
June 27, 2006	On the Way to the Wedding	ISBN: 9780062353818
May 27, 2008	The Lost Duke of Wyndham	ISBN: 9780060876104
September 30, 2008	Mr. Cavendish, I Presume	ISBN: 9780060876111
June 30, 2009	What Happens in London	ISBN: 9780061491887
October 13, 2009	The Secret Diaries of Miss Miranda Cheever	ISBN: 9780061230837
May 25, 2010	Ten Things I Love About You	ISBN: 9780061491894
December 28, 2010	The Lady Most Likely...	ISBN: 9780061247828
May 31, 2011	Just Like Heaven	ISBN: 9780061491900
May 29, 2012	A Night Like This	ISBN: 9780062072900
December 26, 2012	The Lady Most Willing...	ISBN: 9780062107381
April 2, 2013	The Bridgertons: Happily Ever After	ISBN: 9780063141278
October 29, 2013	The Sum Of All Kisses	ISBN: 9780062072924
January 27, 2015	The Secrets of Sir Richard Kenworthy	ISBN: 9780062072948
March 29, 2016	Because of Miss Bridgerton	ISBN: 9780062388148
December 27, 2016	Four Weddings and a Sixpence	ISBN: 9780062428424
May 30, 2017	The Girl with the Make-Believe Husband	ISBN: 9780062388179
November 20, 2018	The Other Miss Bridgerton	ISBN: 9780062388209
April 21, 2020	First Comes Scandal	ISBN: 9780062956163
May 26, 2020	Bridgerton Collection Volume 1	ISBN: 9780063045118
March 30, 2021	Bridgerton Collection Volume 2	ISBN: 9780063138933
March 30, 2021	Bridgerton Collection Volume 3	ISBN: 9780063138957
November 9, 2021	The Wit and Wisdom of Bridgerton	ISBN: 9780063216020
March 15, 2022	Bridgerton Box Set 1-4	ISBN: 9780063238787
May 10, 2022	Miss Butterworth and the Mad Baron, a Graphic Novel	ISBN: 9780062958594
October 18, 2022	Bridgerton Box Set 5-8	ISBN: 9780063303713
May 2, 2023	Bridgerton Prequels Collection	ISBN: 9780063347731
May 9, 2023	Queen Charlotte	ISBN: 9780063307148
July 23, 2024	Bridgerton Collector's Edition, 1	ISBN: 9780063383609
August 13, 2024	Bridgerton Collector's Edition, 2	ISBN: 9780063383616
September 17, 2024	Bridgerton Collector's Edition, 3	ISBN: 9780063383661
September 17, 2024	Bridgerton Collector's Edition, 4	ISBN: 9780063383739
Denotes Bridgerton / Rokesby series.

All books from Splendid through First Comes Scandal are mass market paperbacks published by Avon Books;
Bridgerton Collection Volume 1 through Bridgerton Collection Volume 3 and The Wit and Wisdom of Bridgerton are e-books;
Bridgerton Box Set 1-4, Miss Butterworth and Bridgerton Box Set 5-8 are mass market paperbacks;
Bridgerton Prequels Collection is an e-book; Queen Charlotte is a mass market paperback;
and the last four collection books, also by Avon, are hardcover books.

=== Splendid Trilogy ===
- Splendid (1995)
- Dancing at Midnight (1995)
- Minx (1996)
- "A Tale of Two Sisters" in Where's My Hero? (2003, anthology with Lisa Kleypas and Kinley MacGregor)

=== Lyndon Sisters ===
- Everything and the Moon (1997)
- Brighter Than the Sun (1997)

=== Agents of the Crown ===
- To Catch an Heiress (1998)
- How To Marry a Marquis (1999)

=== Bridgerton series ===
- The Duke and I (2000)
- The Viscount Who Loved Me (2000)
- An Offer From a Gentleman (2001)
- Romancing Mister Bridgerton (2002)
- To Sir Phillip, With Love (2003)
- When He Was Wicked (2004)
- It's In His Kiss (2005)
- On the Way to the Wedding (2006)
- The Bridgertons: Happily Ever After (2013)

=== Two Dukes of Wyndham ===
According to Quinn, this two-book set was based on the premise, "Two men say they're the Duke of something. One of them must be wrong," inspired by a lyric from the Dire Straits song, "Industrial Disease". The events are concurrent and the plots are intertwined, with some scenes appearing in both books but from different perspectives.

- The Lost Duke of Wyndham (2008)
- Mr. Cavendish, I Presume (2008)

=== Bevelstoke series ===
- The Secret Diaries of Miss Miranda Cheever (2007)
- What Happens in London (2009)
- Ten Things I Love About You (2010)

=== Smythe-Smith quartet ===
- Just like Heaven (2011)
- A Night like This (2012)
- The Sum of All Kisses (2013)
- The Secrets of Sir Richard Kenworthy (2015)

=== Rokesby series ===
The Rokesby series is often considered a prequel series as it follows the Rokesby and Bridgerton families.

- Because of Miss Bridgerton (2016)
- The Girl with the Make-Believe Husband (2017)
- The Other Miss Bridgerton (2018)
- First Comes Scandal (2020)

=== Collections ===
- Bridgerton Collection Volume 1 (2020) – The Duke and I (2000) / The Viscount Who Loved Me (2000) / An Offer from a Gentleman (2001)
- Bridgerton Collection Volume 2 (2021) – Romancing Mister Bridgerton (2002) / To Sir Phillip, With Love (2003) / When He Was Wicked (2004)
- Bridgerton Collection Volume 3 (2021) – It's In His Kiss (2005) / On the Way to the Wedding (2006) / Because of Miss Bridgerton (2016)
- Bridgerton Box Set 1-4 (2022) – The Duke and I (2000) / The Viscount Who Loved Me (2000) / An Offer from a Gentleman (2001) / Romancing Mister Bridgerton (2000)
- Bridgerton Box Set 5-8 (2022) – To Sir Phillip, With Love (2003) / When He Was Wicked (2004) / It's In His Kiss (2005) / On the Way to the Wedding (2006)
- Bridgerton Prequels Collection (2023) – Because of Miss Bridgerton (2016) / The Girl with the Make-Believe Husband (2017) / The Other Miss Bridgerton (2018) / First Comes Scandal (2020)
- Bridgerton Collector's Edition, 1 (2024) – The Duke and I (2000) / The Viscount Who Loved Me (2000)
- Bridgerton Collector's Edition, 2 (2024) – An Offer from a Gentleman (2001) / Romancing Mister Bridgerton (2000)
- Bridgerton Collector's Edition, 3 (2024) – To Sir Phillip, With Love (2003) / When He Was Wicked (2004)
- Bridgerton Collector's Edition, 4 (2024) – It's In His Kiss (2005) / On the Way to the Wedding (2006)

=== Lady Whistledown ===
The witty gossip columnist "Lady Whistledown" from the Bridgerton series ties together these two anthologies of interlinked novellas:

- "Thirty-Six Valentines" in The Further Observations of Lady Whistledown (2003, anthology with Suzanne Enoch, Karen Hawkins and Mia Ryan)
- "The First Kiss" in Lady Whistledown Strikes Back (2004, anthology with Suzanne Enoch, Karen Hawkins and Mia Ryan)

and also

- The Wit and Wisdom of Bridgerton (2021)

=== The Lady Most... ===
- The Lady Most Likely... (December 28, 2010 a novel in three parts with Connie Brockway and Eloisa James)
- The Lady Most Willing... (December 26, 2012 a novel in three parts with Connie Brockway and Eloisa James)

=== Novellas ===
- "Gretna Greene" in Scottish Brides (June 1, 1999 an anthology with Christina Dodd, Stephanie Laurens and Karen Ranney)
- "... and a Sixpence in Her Shoe" in Four Weddings and a Sixpence (December 27, 2016 an anthology with Elizabeth Boyle, Stefanie Sloane and Laura Lee Guhrke)

=== Graphic novels ===
- Miss Butterworth and the Mad Baron, a Graphic Novel (illustrated by Violet Charles) (2022)

=== Adaptations ===
- Queen Charlotte (2023 TV tie-in for Queen Charlotte: A Bridgerton Story, with Shonda Rhimes)

=== Other ===
- Contributor to Encounters with Jane Austen: Celebrating 250 years. (2025)

== Recognition ==
- 1997 – Everything and the Moon nominated for Best Regency Historical by Romantic Times Magazine
- 2001 – Finalist in the Romance Writers of America's RITA Awards
- 2002 – Romancing Mister Bridgerton voted one of the top ten books of the year by RWA membership
  Finalist for the RWA RITA Awards in the Long Historical category
- 2002 – To Sir Phillip, With Love named one of the six best mass market original novels of the year by Publishers Weekly
- 2003 – Quinn was profiled in Time magazine
- 2007 – Received Romance Writers of America RITA Award for Best Long Historical Romance, for On the Way to the Wedding
- 2008 – Received Romance Writers of America RITA Award for Best Regency Historical Romance, for The Secret Diaries of Miss Miranda Cheever
- 2010 – Received Romance Writers of America RITA Award for Best Regency Historical Romance for What Happens in London
- 2010 – Quinn was inducted into the Romance Writers of America Hall of Fame
- 2016 – Quinn taught the inaugural romance writing course at the Yale Summer Writers Conference
