= Shirley Dynevor =

Welsh actress (1933–2023)

- Born: Shirley Teague; 15 May 1933; Cardiff, Glamorganshire, Wales
- Died: 10 January 2023 (aged 89); Altrincham, Cheshire, England
- Spouses: Gerard Dynevor (m. 1954; died 1966); Simon White (m. 1989)
- Children: 2
- Relatives: Sally Dynevor (daughter-in-law); Phoebe Dynevor (granddaughter); Hattie Dynevor (granddaughter)

Shirley Dynevor (/ˈdɪnɪvər/; 15 May 1933 – 10 January 2023) was a Welsh actress. She was the grandmother of actresses Phoebe and Hattie Dynevor.

== Early life ==
Shirley Teague was born on 15 May 1933 in Cardiff to Nancy (née Sutton), a nurse, and Hedley Teague, a landscape gardener.

She attended Hereford Grammar School for Girls and afterwards worked in repertory theatre in Pontypridd before moving to London.

== Career ==
In 1953, she was invited to join Joan Littlewood's Theatre Workshop, where she would later meet her future husband Gerard Dynevor. Between 1953 and 1959, she performed in many productions with the workshop at Theatre Royal Stratford East including A Christmas Carol (1953), The Dutch Courtesan (1954), Richard II (1954) and An Italian Straw Hat (1955).

In the 1950s, Dynevor had a starring role in the series Charlesworth. Other television roles included Scotland Yard, Armchair Theatre, Family Solicitor, The Liars, Crown Court and The Wednesday Play.

After her husband's death in 1966, Dynevor stopped acting to look after her two sons, but continued to take the occasional role, such as in 1976, when she starred as Eva Braun in Rogue Male.

For the last 15 years of her career, Dynevor worked as a stage manager on Coronation Street.

== Personal life and death ==
In 1954, she met actor Gerard Dynevor (d. 1966) after he joined the Theatre Workshop. He invited her to a café within minutes of meeting, where he proposed to her. Later that year, she would give birth to a son, Jonathan. They would later have another son, Tim. After Gerard left acting, the family moved to Altrincham where Gerard worked as a director at Granada Television.

In 1989, Dynevor married guitarist Simon White.

Her granddaughters Phoebe and Hattie Dynevor are also actresses.

In 2009, she was diagnosed with dementia.

Dynevor died in Altrincham on 10 January 2023, aged 89.
