= Phoebe Dynevor =

English actress (born 1995)

Phoebe Dynevor Fuller
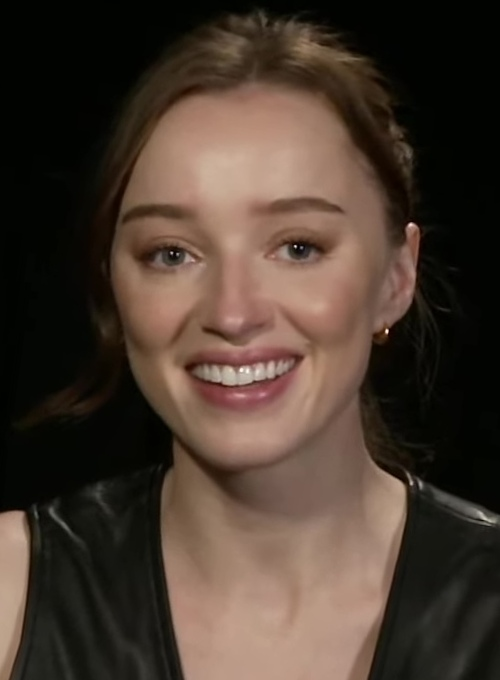
- Dynevor in 2023
- Born: Phoebe Harriet Dynevor; 17 April 1995 (age 31); Manchester, Greater Manchester, England
- Occupation: Actress
- Years active: 2009–present
- Spouse: Cameron Fuller (m. 2026)
- Mother: Sally Dynevor
- Relatives: Shirley Dynevor (grandmother); Brad Fuller (father in-law)

Phoebe Harriet Dynevor Fuller (née Dynevor; /ˈdɪnɪvər/ DIH-nih-vər; born 17 April 1995) is an English actress. She is known for starring in the films The Colour Room (2021), Fair Play (2023), and Inheritance (2025) as well as the first two seasons of the period drama Bridgerton (2020–2022). She earned a BAFTA Rising Star Award nomination in 2024.

Dynevor began her career as a child actress in the BBC One school drama Waterloo Road (2009–2010). She went on to have recurring roles in the BBC series Prisoners' Wives (2012–2013) and Dickensian (2015–2016), and the TV Land comedy-drama Younger (2017–2021), as well as a main role in the Crackle crime series Snatch (2017–2018).

== Early life ==
Phoebe Harriet Dynevor was born on 17 April 1995 in the Trafford district of Greater Manchester, to screenwriter Tim Dynevor and actress Sally Dynevor. Her paternal grandparents, Shirley and Gerard Dynevor also worked in the television industry. She has two younger siblings, brother Samuel and sister Hattie.

Dynevor was educated at Oakfield Nursery School in Altrincham, and then at Cheadle Hulme School in Stockport.

== Career ==
=== Beginnings (2009–2019) ===
In 2009, 14-year-old Dynevor landed her first role as Siobhan Mailey in the fifth series of Waterloo Road. Later, she made appearances in several British dramas such as Monroe and The Musketeers. She then had a supporting role in BBC drama Prisoners' Wives as a gangster's daughter Lauren. In 2014, she appeared in the second series of The Village and from 2015 to 2016 she played Martha Cratchit in Dickensian.

In 2016, it was announced Dynevor would be starring alongside Luke Pasqualino and Rupert Grint in Crackle crime comedy series Snatch, making her American television debut. The series was released on 16 March 2017 and was later renewed for a second season. In 2017, Dynevor joined the cast of the TV Land comedy-drama series Younger in the recurring role of Clare, Josh's (Nico Tortorella) Irish fiancée.

=== Breakthrough and work on film (2020–present) ===
In 2019, Dynevor was cast as Daphne Bridgerton, the lead character in the first season of the Shonda Rhimes-produced Netflix period drama Bridgerton based on the Regency romance novel The Duke and I, which premiered in December 2020. She reprised her role in the show's second series in 2022 as part of the supporting cast, now as Daphne Basset following the character's marriage. Dynevor confirmed in January 2023 that she would not appear in season 3, but left the door open for a future return.

Dynevor made her feature film debut as the ceramicist Clarice Cliff in the 2021 biographical film The Colour Room, directed by Claire McCarthy for Sky Cinema. In April 2022, Dynevor guest starred as a fictional version of herself in an episode of the British Call My Agent! remake, titled Ten Percent on Amazon Prime. In January 2023, Dynevor starred in the Netflix biographical film Bank of Dave alongside Rory Kinnear, and opposite Alden Ehrenreich in the thriller film Fair Play, which opened at the Sundance Film Festival to critical acclaim. Her next films were the spy thriller Inheritance with Rhys Ifans and the family thriller Anniversary in 2025, and Tommy Wirkola's shark thriller Thrash with Djimon Hounsou in 2026.

Dynevor has upcoming roles in the Sony Pictures thriller film I Heart Murder directed by Matt Spicer and the psychological thriller Wichita Libra. In addition, Dynevor is attached to executive produce and star in a television adaptation of Naoise Dolan's novel Exciting Times and a film adaptation of the Jonathan Stroud novel The Outlaws Scarlett and Browne, both for Amazon Prime. In 2024, she joined as Daphne du Maurier in Richard Eyre's The Housekeeper, though she left the project and was replaced by Emma Laird before filming began. In March 2026, she was the first cast in Matt Charman's television series Dirty for Amazon Prime.

== Personal life ==
Dynevor practices transcendental meditation daily.

Dynevor met actor Cameron Fuller at the 2023 Sundance Film Festival. The couple married in Provence, France, on 5 September 2026.

== Charity ==
Dynevor is ambassador for ActionAid UK, an organisation that raises awareness for women and girls living in poverty around the world.

== Acting credits ==
Key
†	Denotes productions that have not yet been released

=== Film ===
Year	Title	Role	Notes
2021	The Colour Room	Clarice Cliff	
2023	Bank of Dave	Alexandra	
2023	Fair Play	Emily Meyers	
2024	More Flames		Short film
2025	Inheritance	Maya Welch	
2025	Anniversary	Liz Nettles	
2026	Thrash	Lisa Fields	
2026	Remain	Wren	
2027	Pendulum †	Abigail	Post-production
2027	Beach Read †	January Andrews	Filming
TBA	Famous †		Post-production

=== Television ===
Year	Title	Role	Notes
2009–2010	Waterloo Road	Siobhan Mailey	Series regular; 20 episodes
2011	Monroe	Phoebe Cormack	Season 1, episode 4
2012–2013	Prisoners' Wives	Lauren Miller	Recurring role; 10 episodes
2014	The Village	Phoebe Rundle	Recurring role; 6 episodes
2015	The Musketeers	Camille	Episode: "The Prodigal Father"
2015–2016	Dickensian	Martha Cratchit	Recurring role; 11 episodes
2017–2018	Snatch	Lottie Mott	Main role
2017–2021	Younger	Clare O'Brien	Recurring role; 11 episodes
2020–2022	Bridgerton	Daphne Basset (née Bridgerton), Duchess of Hastings	Seasons 1–2
2022	Ten Percent	Herself (fictionalised)	Episode: "Episode 5"

=== Music video ===
Year	Title	Performer	Album	Ref.
2025	"Camera"	Ed Sheeran	Play	

== Awards and nominations ==
Year	Award	Category	Nominated work	Result	Ref.
2021	MTV Movie & TV Awards	Best Kiss (w/ Regé-Jean Page)	Bridgerton	Nominated	
2021	Satellite Awards	Best Actress in a Television Series – Drama	Bridgerton	Nominated	
2021	Screen Actors Guild Awards	Outstanding Performance by an Ensemble in a Drama Series	Bridgerton	Nominated	
2021	TV Choice Awards	Best Actress	Bridgerton	Nominated	
2023	National Film Awards UK	Best Supporting Actress	Bank of Dave	Nominated	
2023	Indiana Film Journalists Association	Best Lead Performance	Fair Play	Nominated	
2024	British Academy Film Awards	Rising Star	—N/a	Nominated	
2024	National Film Awards UK	Best Actress	Fair Play	Nominated	
