= Catherine Anderson =

American novelist (born 1948)

Adeline Catherine Anderson
- Born: Adeline Catherine; December 22, 1948 (age 77); Grants Pass, Oregon, U.S.
- Occupation: Novelist
- Spouse: Sidney D. Anderson
- Children: 2
- Writing career
- Pen name: Catherine Anderson
- Language: English language
- Period: 1988–Present
- Genres: Romance, Suspense
- Website: www.catherineanderson.com

Catherine Anderson (born December 22, 1948) is an American best-selling writer of historical and contemporary romance novels since 1988.

== Biography ==
Adeline Catherine was born on 22 December 1948 in Grants Pass, Oregon, the daughter of Benjamin Early La May, a chef. Her mother was a writer, and some of her earliest memories are of hearing her mother type stories on an old typewriter, and then read the finished work aloud. With this inspiration, she began writing her own stories as a child. Feeling that a career as a published writer was out of reach, however, she decided to major in accounting when she attended college so that she could help her husband, Sidney D. Anderson, keep the books at his company. After realizing that numbers did not make her happy, and with her husband's full blessing, Anderson dropped out of college so that she could pursue a writing career.

Catherine Anderson's first four published books were category romance, under the Harlequin Intrigue romantic suspense line. Her subsequent single-title works have alternated between contemporary and historical romances. Many of her novels feature a character with a disability, be it physical or mental, and show the reader how those disabilities can be overcome. Animals are also a recurrent theme in her stories, with many books set on or near ranches. Romantic Times Magazine describes her novels as "moving, heartwarming,...celebrat[ing] the ideals of perfect love in an imperfect world. Her characters are complex, often conflicted individuals who triumph over substantial odds." Reader acclaims describe her books as funny, delightful, heartwrenching, beautiful, superb, and of classic proportions.

Anderson, who is part Shoshone, and her husband, Sidney D. Anderson, live on 160 acres (0.65 km^{2}) in Oregon. They have two grown sons, Sidney D. Anderson, Jr. and John G. Anderson. The pair love the wildlife on their pristine mountain ridge and greatly enjoy the solitude of their wilderness lifestyle, which is, Anderson says, a writer's dream. Their estate, heavily guarded by electronic surveillance, is off limits to hunters, providing all wild creatures sanctuary. Their three dogs are allowed to run at large on the property.

In May 2008, Anderson's Comanche Moon was reissued and placed on The New York Times Best Seller list.

== Reception ==
Her later novels, including Sun Kissed and Morning Light have reached the top 5 and 10 of the New York Times Bestseller List. She has been nominated nine times for Romantic Times Reviewers' Choice Awards, her book Cherish was a Romantic Times award winner, and she has also been awarded one of their Career Achievement Awards.

== Bibliography ==
=== Historical Novels ===
- Coming up Roses, 1993
- Cheyenne Amber, 1994
- Annie's Song, 1996
- Simply Love, 1997
- Cherish, 1998
- Walking on Air, 2014

=== Harlequin Intrigue ===
- Reasonable Doubt, 1988
- Without a Trace, 1989
- Switchback, 1990
- Cry of the Wild, 1992

=== Contemporary Romance ===
- Forever After, 1998
- Seventh Heaven, 2000
- Always in My Heart, 2002
- Only By Your Touch, 2003
- The Christmas Room, 2017

=== The Comanche Series ===
1. Comanche Moon, 1991
2. Comanche Heart, 1991
3. Indigo Blue, 1992
4. Comanche Magic, 1994

=== Keegan-Paxton Family Series ===
1. Keegan's Lady, 1996
2. "Beautiful Gifts" in The True Love Wedding Dress, 2005
3. Summer Breeze, 2006
4. Early Dawn, 2010
5. Lucky Penny, 2012

=== Kendrick/Coulter/Harrigan Series ===
1. Baby Love, 1999
2. Phantom Waltz, 2001
3. Sweet Nothings, 2002
4. Blue Skies,, 2004
5. Bright Eyes, 2004
6. My Sunshine, 2005
7. Sun Kissed, 2007
8. Morning Light, 2008
9. Star Bright, 2009
10. Here to Stay, 2011
11. Perfect Timing, 2013

=== Mystic Creek Series ===
1. Silver Thaw, 2015
2. New Leaf, 2016
3. Mulberry Moon, 2017
4. Spring Forward, 2018
5. Strawberry Hill, 2018
6. Huckleberry Lake, 2019
7. Maple Leaf Harvest, 2021

=== Anthologies ===
- "Shotgun Bride" in Tall, Dark, and Dangerous, 1994
- "Fancy Free" in Three Weddings and a Kiss and in Three Times a Bride, 1995
- "Beautiful Gifts" in The True Love Wedding Dress, 2005
- "Autumn Treasures" in Cast of Characters, 2012

== See also ==
- List of romantic novelists
