= Suzanne Enoch =

American novelist

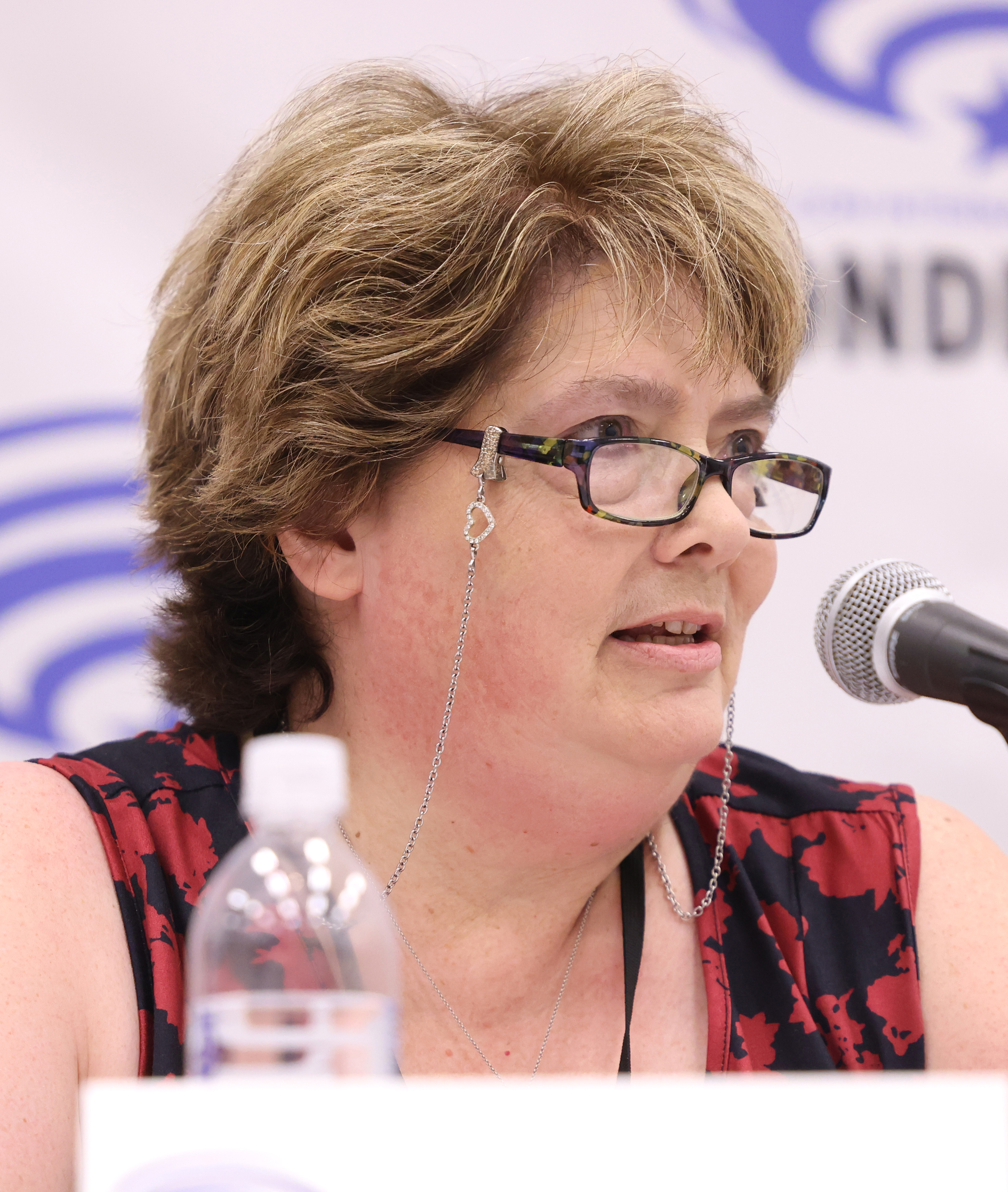
- Enoch in 2026
- Born: California, United States
- Education: University of California, Irvine
- Occupation: Novelist
- Writing career
- Period: 1995–present
- Genres: Romance, Contemporary
- Website: www.suzanneenoch.com

Suzanne Enoch (born around 1964 in California) is an American author of best-selling contemporary and historical Regency romance novels.

Enoch began writing down her own stories when she was a child. She graduated from the University of California, Irvine with a degree in English. Her first attempts at writing were in the romantic fantasy genre, but she soon began writing Regency romances. Her first novel, The Black Duke's Prize, was published by Avon in 1995. She quit her full-time job in 2002 to devote herself to writing.

Although Enoch has had great success writing Regency romances, in 2005 she published her first contemporary romantic suspense novel, the first book in her Samantha Jellicoe series. She has continued to write in both genres, telling an interviewer that "I think working in one genre replenishes my energy for the other." Her novels have appeared on The New York Times Best Seller list as well as those compiled by USA Today and Publishers Weekly.

== Awards ==
- 1998 – Romantic Times Reviewer's Choice Award nominee for Regency of the Year, Angel's Devil

== Bibliography ==
=== Regencies ===
- The Black Duke's Prize (1995)
- Angel's Devil (1995)
- Lady Rogue (1997)
- Stolen Kisses (1997)
- 1818: Isabel (The Legend of Nimway Hall, multi-author series) (2018)
- Something in the Heir (2022)

=== The Bancroft Brothers ===
- By Love Undone (1998)
- Taming Rafe (1999)

=== With This Ring ===
- Reforming a Rake (2000)
- Meet Me at Midnight (2000)
- A Matter of Scandal (2001)

=== Lessons in Love ===
- The Rake (2002)
- London's Perfect Scoundrel (2003)
- England's Perfect Hero (2004)

=== The Griffin Family ===
- Sin and Sensibility (2004)
- An Invitation to Sin (2005)
- Something Sinful (2006)
- Sins of a Duke (2007)

=== The Notorious Gentlemen ===
- After the Kiss (2008)
- Before the Scandal (2008)
- Always A Scoundrel (2009)

=== The Adventurers' Club ===
- The Care and Taming of a Rogue (2009)
- A Lady's Guide to Improper Behavior (2010)
- Rules of an Engagement (2010)

=== Samantha Jellicoe series ===
- Flirting with Danger (December 2005)
- Don't Look Down (March 2005)
- Billionaires Prefer Blondes (October 2006)
- Twice the Temptation (July 2007)
- A Touch of Minx (September 2007)
- Barefoot in the Dark (August 2018)

=== The Scandalous Brides ===
- A Beginner's Guide to Rakes (2011)
- "The Wicked One: A Beginner's Guide to Rakes Prequel," short story (2012)
- Taming an Impossible Rogue (2012)
- Rules to Catch a Devilish Duke (2012)
- The Handbook to Handling His Lordship (2013)

=== Scandalous Highlanders ===
- "One Hot Scot," short story in Christmas Brides (2013)
- The Devil Wears Kilts (2013)
- Rogue with a Brogue (2014)
- Mad, Bad, and Dangerous in Plaid (2015)
- Some Like it Scot (2015)

=== No Ordinary Hero ===
- Hero in the Highlands (2016)
- My One True Highlander (2017)
- A Devil in Scotland (2018)

=== Wild Wicked Highlanders ===
- It's Getting Scot in Here (2019)
- Scot Under the Covers (2020)
- Hit Me With Your Best Scot (2021)

=== Short stories ===
- "Good Earl Hunting" (2012), standalone
- "One True Love" in The Further Observations of Lady Whistledown (2003)
- "The Best of Both Worlds" in Lady Whistledown Strikes Back (2004)
- "Take Two" in I Loved You First (2020)
- "Great Scot!" in Kissing Under the Mistletoe (2021)
