= Bridgerton season 2 =

Second season of the Netflix series Bridgerton

Bridgerton
- Season 2
- Promotional poster
- Showrunners: Chris Van Dusen; Jess Brownell
- Starring: Adjoa Andoh; Lorraine Ashbourne; Simone Ashley; Jonathan Bailey; Harriet Cains; Bessie Carter; Charithra Chandran; Shelley Conn; Nicola Coughlan; Phoebe Dynevor; Ruth Gemmell; Florence Hunt; Claudia Jessie; Calam Lynch; Golda Rosheuvel; Luke Thompson; Will Tilston; Polly Walker; Rupert Young; Julie Andrews
- No. of episodes: 8

Release
- Original network: Netflix
- Original release: March 25, 2022

Season chronology
- ← Previous; Season 1 Next → Season 3

The second season of the American historical romance series Bridgerton premiered on March 25, 2022 consisting of eight episodes. It is based on the second volume of the Bridgerton novel series The Viscount Who Loved Me, focusing on the eldest Bridgerton sibling Anthony, played by Jonathan Bailey. The season received positive reviews from critics with particular praise for the performance of Bailey and chemistry of the lead characters.

== Premise ==
During London's impending social season, Anthony Bridgerton believes it is time to carry out his responsibility as Viscount and find a wife for himself. With no interest in a love match due to the trauma of watching his mother lose his father at a young age, he sets his eyes on Edwina Sharma, a recent arrival to the city and the Queen's diamond of the season who ticks his boxes. His attempts to pursue Edwina are frustratingly thwarted by her stunning and independent older sister Kate.

== Cast and characters ==
- Adjoa Andoh as Lady Agatha Danbury (née Soma Anderson), the sharp-tongued, insightful doyenne of the ton
- Lorraine Ashbourne as Mrs. Varley, the Featheringtons' housekeeper
- Simone Ashley as Kathani "Kate" Sharma, the smart, independent, and headstrong step-daughter of Mary Sheffield by marriage to Mister Sharma, a tradesman and single father
- Jonathan Bailey as Lord Anthony Bridgerton, 9th Viscount Bridgerton, the eldest Bridgerton sibling and head of the family
- Harriet Cains as Philippa Featherington, (Note: Credited as a series regular in the first, second and eighth episodes.) the middle Featherington daughter
- Bessie Carter as Prudence Featherington, the eldest Featherington daughter
- Charithra Chandran as Edwina Sharma, Kate's younger half-sister
- Shelley Conn as Lady Mary Sharma (née Sheffield), Kate's stepmother and Edwina's mother
- Nicola Coughlan as Penelope Featherington, the youngest Featherington daughter
- Phoebe Dynevor as Daphne Basset (née Bridgerton), (Note: Credited as a series regular in the first, third, fourth, sixth and eighth episodes.) Duchess of Hastings, the fourth Bridgerton child and eldest daughter. Wife of Simon Basset, Duke of Hastings and the mother of August "Augie" Basset
- Ruth Gemmell as Lady Violet Bridgerton, Dowager Viscountess Bridgerton (née Ledger), mother of the Bridgerton children
- Florence Hunt as Hyacinth Bridgerton, the eighth and youngest Bridgerton child
- Claudia Jessie as Eloise Bridgerton, the fifth Bridgerton child and second daughter
- Calam Lynch as Theo Sharpe, an apprentice at the printing shop used by Lady Whistledown who befriends Eloise
- Golda Rosheuvel as Queen Charlotte of the United Kingdom, the leader of the ton and wife of King George III
- Luke Thompson as Benedict Bridgerton, the second Bridgerton son
- Will Tilston as Gregory Bridgerton, the seventh Bridgerton child and youngest son
- Polly Walker as Lady Portia Featherington, Dowager Baroness Featherington, the matriarch of the Featherington family
- Rupert Young as Jack, Baron Featherington, the new head of the Featherington family
- Julie Andrews as the voice of Lady Whistledown, the author of a scandalous society newsletter

== Episodes ==
| No. overall | No. in season | Title | Directed by | Teleplay by | Original release date |
|---|---|---|---|---|---|
| 9 | 1 | "Capital R Rake" | Tricia Brock | Chris Van Dusen | March 25, 2022 |
Anthony starts seeking a wife and immediately becomes one of the season's most eligible bachelors. He meets with several eligible ladies, but no prospects intrigue him. Eloise is set to make her debut in society, but her presentation to the queen is interrupted by the return of Lady Whistledown's scandal sheets. On a morning ride, Anthony meets a young woman he later learns is Miss Kate Sharma. Lady Danbury has sponsored the Sharma family for the season; Kate and her stepmother, Lady Mary, aim to find Mary's accomplished daughter Edwina a husband. Kate encourages Edwina to find a love match, but keeps from her a deal with Mary's noble parents to gain a trust fund on the condition that Edwina marry a peer. Kate overhears Anthony proclaiming that he does not care if he loves his wife so long as she is agreeable. The queen names Edwina the season's diamond, and Anthony resolves to make her his wife. Meanwhile, Portia struggles with her family's finances before the new Featherington heir, Jack, arrives in London.
| 10 | 2 | "Off to the Races" | Tricia Brock | Daniel Robinson | March 25, 2022 |
Edwina has drawn the eye of several suitors, and Kate has taken charge of deciding which ones Edwina will meet. To Anthony's dismay, she is staunchly against Anthony courting her. Colin returns from his travels, while Eloise becomes intrigued with finding out Lady Whistledown's identity once again. After learning that Edwina will be at the horse races accompanied by another lord, Anthony takes his family and manages to ingratiate himself with Edwina. Queen Charlotte plans to use Edwina to unmask Lady Whistledown. Benedict entertains the prospect of studying art. Anthony impresses Edwina with a speech at a soiree hosted by Lady Danbury in which he promises her duty but not "passion", much to Kate's dismay. Genevieve catches Penelope at the market.
| 11 | 3 | "A Bee in Your Bonnet" | Alex Pillai | Sarah L. Thompson | March 25, 2022 |
A series of flashbacks reveal the sudden death of Anthony's father Edmund due to a bee sting, and the grief he saw his mother go through while he faced pressure in becoming the new viscount. In the present day, the Bridgertons are preparing for their prestigious annual country party at Aubrey Hall, and Anthony has invited the Sharmas to stay for a few days ahead of the party. Along with Kate and Edwina, the siblings play a spirited game of pall-mall that results in Anthony and Kate bonding. To Kate's dismay, Anthony charms Edwina and tries to propose at dinner but backs out at the last moment. Benedict is accepted at the Royal Academy Schools while Eloise becomes interested in women's rights. Fearing that Jack will marry Cressida Cowper and oust the Featherington women from their home, Portia plots to have Prudence marry him. Penelope recruits Genevieve to be part of the Lady Whistledown scheme. In the gardens of Aubrey Hall, Kate is stung by a bee, causing Anthony to panic; the two almost kiss.
| 12 | 4 | "Victory" | Alex Pillai | Chris Van Dusen & Jess Brownell | March 25, 2022 |
Guests begin arriving at Aubrey Hall for the Bridgerton party. Unaware of their mutual attraction, Edwina encourages Kate to spend time with Anthony, thinking Kate's disapproval keeps him from proposing. Kate goes on a hunt with the men, where she and Anthony share another physical moment. Colin visits Marina, now Lady Crane, and meets her new husband. Marina's marriage is not happy, but she tells Colin to move on. Daphne tries to get to know Edwina, but is unconvinced that she is a good match for Anthony. Portia arranges for Jack and Prudence to be caught alone to force them into marriage, but Jack reveals that he is secretly penniless and had been planning to marry Cressida for her fortune. Daphne catches Anthony and Kate in a compromising position in the library, as Anthony provokes Kate to reveal her true feelings. Daphne urges Anthony to be honest with himself. As the Sharmas prepare to depart for London, Anthony proposes to Edwina, and she accepts.
| 13 | 5 | "An Unthinkable Fate" | Tom Verica | Abby McDonald | March 25, 2022 |
Queen Charlotte heartily approves of Anthony and Edwina's engagement and even offers to host the wedding. Anthony becomes jealous when Kate goes on a boat ride with another man. Eloise sneaks out to Bloomsbury to attend a meeting about equal rights and meets Theo Sharpe, a printer's assistant. Mary's parents, the Sheffields, visit London to meet Edwina, but at dinner they display contempt for Mary and Kate, and their arrangement that Edwina should marry a nobleman comes to light. Defending all three of the Sharma women, Anthony orders the Sheffields to leave but is hesitant to continue the marriage; Kate convinces him to do so even as they admit to their feelings. Upon learning that several gentlemen are interested in investing in Jack's mines, Portia convinces him to take their money.
| 14 | 6 | "The Choice" | Tom Verica | Lou-Lou Igbokwe | March 25, 2022 |
Preparations are underway for Anthony and Edwina's wedding. Daphne tries to steer Anthony into calling it off, to no avail. Kate offers her mother's bracelets for Edwina to wear, but her sister tells her to wear them instead. At the wedding, Kate and Anthony cannot help but stare at each other; when Kate drops her bracelet at the altar, Anthony rushes to help her. Edwina realizes their connection and runs away from the altar. A furious Queen Charlotte has the guests stay in the garden as Edwina composes herself. Kate tries to explain herself to Edwina, and Anthony confirms he is intent on the marriage; however, Edwina eventually decides that she cannot marry him. Kate and Anthony are left alone in the church and kiss. In the chaos, Jack makes potential business connections, and Eloise takes the opportunity to visit Theo once again.
| 15 | 7 | "Harmony" | Cheryl Dunye | Oliver Goldstick | March 25, 2022 |
Following the failed wedding, the Bridgertons and Sharmas, along with Lady Danbury, are shunned by the ton. Queen Charlotte accuses Eloise of being Lady Whistledown and gives her three days to come clean, or risk punishment for her family. Eloise confides this in Penelope; in an attempt to protect her, Penelope writes that Eloise has been seen fraternizing unchaperoned with political radicals. The news embroils the Bridgertons in further scandal and nobody arrives at the ball they are hosting. Colin considers investing with Jack. Amidst the failed ball, Kate and Anthony confess their attraction and sleep together. The next day, Anthony attempts to visit Kate but is told that she has departed on a horse. Anthony follows Kate into a rainstorm on horseback, but she is thrown from her horse and knocked unconscious.
| 16 | 8 | "The Viscount Who Loved Me" | Cheryl Dunye | Jess Brownell | March 25, 2022 |
Kate is still unconscious, and Lady Whistledown has been suspiciously quiet. Portia persuades Jack to host a ball and invites the Bridgertons and Sharmas; Jack considers moving to America to start over before their fraud is discovered. Eloise ends her friendship with Theo after Penelope falsely tells her that servants have been gossiping about them. Benedict learns that he was likely accepted to the Academy due to a donation from Anthony. Kate awakens from her coma, and Anthony proposes to her, but she declines, believing he is doing so out of guilt and citing her desire to return to India. Edwina reconciles with Kate and convinces her to attend the Featherington ball. Eloise figures out that Penelope is Lady Whistledown and cuts all ties with Penelope. Portia turns on Jack and sends him back to America while keeping most of the funds he had gathered for herself. After the end of Eloise's friendship and overhearing Colin telling other gentlemen that he would never court Penelope, a heartbroken Penelope decides to continue as Lady Whistledown. Kate and Anthony dance at the ball, and the Queen neatly saves their reputations. Anthony and Kate declare their love for one another. After traveling for six months, Kate and Anthony, now married, join the rest of the Bridgertons for another game of pall-mall at Aubrey Hall.

== Production ==
=== Development ===
Before the first season aired, the show was already in pre-production for a second season which was officially announced in January 2021. It is focused on Anthony and based on the book The Viscount Who Loved Me. On April 13, creator Van Dusen revealed on Twitter that the series had additionally been renewed for a third and fourth season.

=== Casting ===
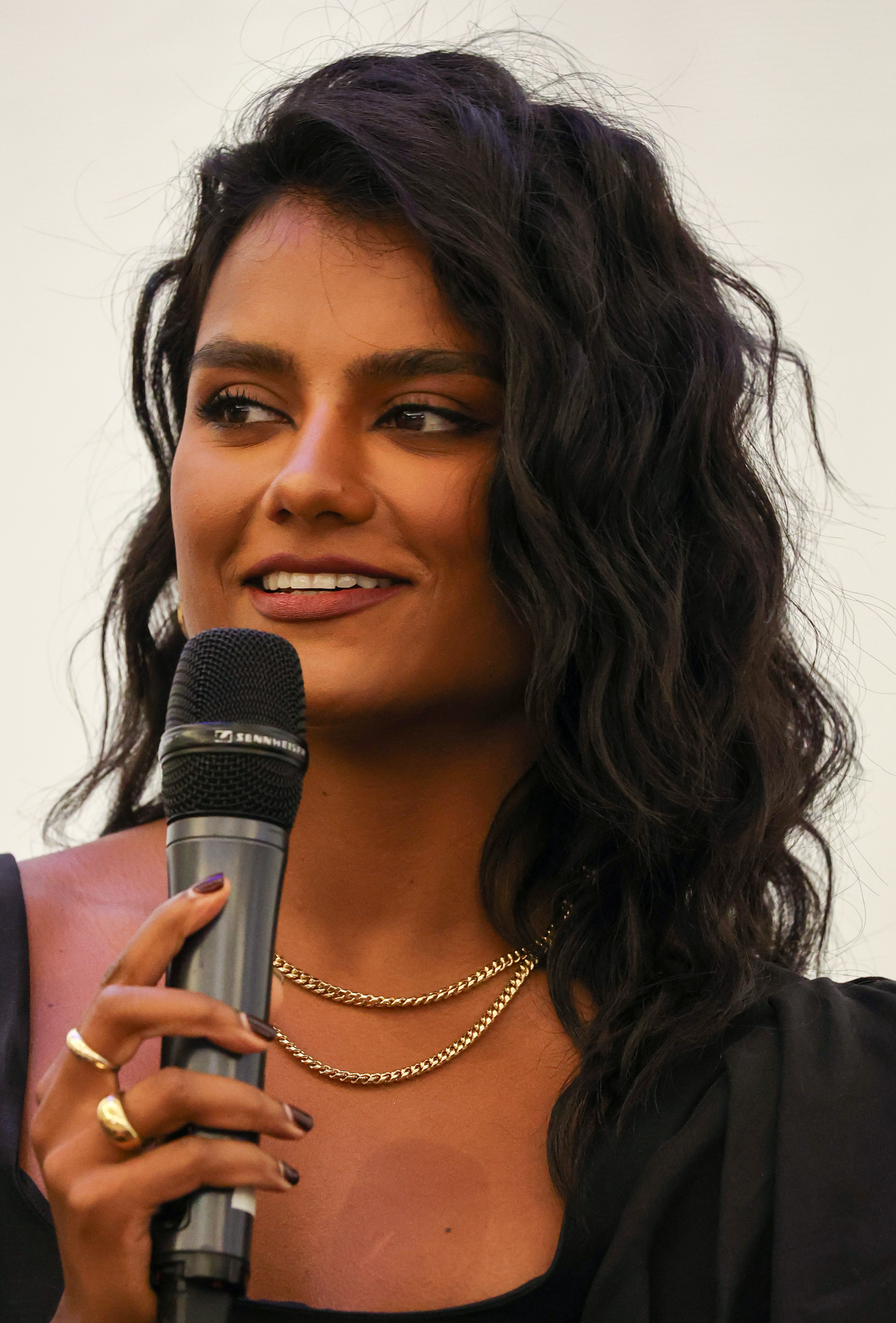
Simone Ashley portrays Kathani "Kate" Sharma

On January 21, 2021, it was announced that Jonathan Bailey would be reprising his role as Anthony and would be the center of the show's sophomore season. The following month, Simone Ashley had been cast as Kate. On April 5, Charithra Chandran joined the cast as Edwina; Rupert Young joined to play a new character; Shelley Conn was cast as Kate's stepmother and Edwina's mother, Mary; and Calam Lynch was cast as Theo Sharpe. On May 28, Rupert Evans joined the cast as Edmund Bridgerton, the late patriarch of the Bridgerton family.

=== Filming ===
Production on the second season began in March 2021. In May, it was reported that the Royal Borough of Windsor and Maidenhead refused permission to build a film set for the second season in Sunninghill Park near Windsor, despite royal approval. On July 15, production on the second season was paused for 24 hours when a crew member tested positive for COVID-19, but resumed the following day. However, on July 17, production was halted indefinitely following a second positive test. Production resumed in August. Production for the second season wrapped on November 20.

New filming locations for season 2 included Wrotham Park (standing in for the Bridgertons' country home Aubrey Hall); West Wycombe Park (Aubrey Hall interior and the Crane estate); Wrest Park, Ivinghoe Beacon, and Ashridge (the Orangery and Aubrey Hall grounds); the Royal County of Berkshire Polo Club (Royal Ascot); Old Royal Naval College; Windsor Great Park (woods scenes); Goldsmiths' Hall (Buckingham palace throne room); and Wilton's Music Hall (feminist meeting place). The real St James's Church is in the series. The art display at Petworth House was used for the museum scene, with Royal Artillery Barracks used as the exterior. The finale ball was filmed at Basildon Park.

== Music ==
For the season, covers included Nirvana's "Stay Away" and Robyn's "Dancing On My Own" by Vitamin String Quartet, Madonna's "Material Girl," "Kabhi Khushi Kabhie Gham" from the soundtrack of the film of the same name and Calvin Harris' "How Deep Is Your Love" by Bowers. Also included are Alanis Morissette's "You Oughta Know" and Pink's "What About Us" by Duomo, Harry Styles' "Sign of the Times" by Steve Horner, Rihanna's "Diamonds" by Hannah V and Joe Rodwell and Miley Cyrus' "Wrecking Ball" by Midnight String Quartet. To promote the show, Morisette appeared in a video performing "You Oughta Know" with Duomo. When discussing the music of season two, music supervisor Justin Kramps explained that "even for these songs that are just huge songs that everyone knows, [an instrumental version] still breathes new life and brings them to a new audience, and in a different way. Pop is where we start, because it fits the style of the show, and it's often using these super-recognizable songs that just add a lot of joy, which is what pop does in general."

== Reception ==
=== Critical response ===
The review aggregator Rotten Tomatoes reported an approval rating of 78% based on 95 reviews, with an average rating of 7.1/10. The website's critics consensus states, "The risqué thrill may have faded, but Bridgerton remains a compulsive episode-turner in this delightful sophomore season." Metacritic gave the series a weighted average score of 70 out of 100 based on 32 reviews, indicating "generally favorable reviews".

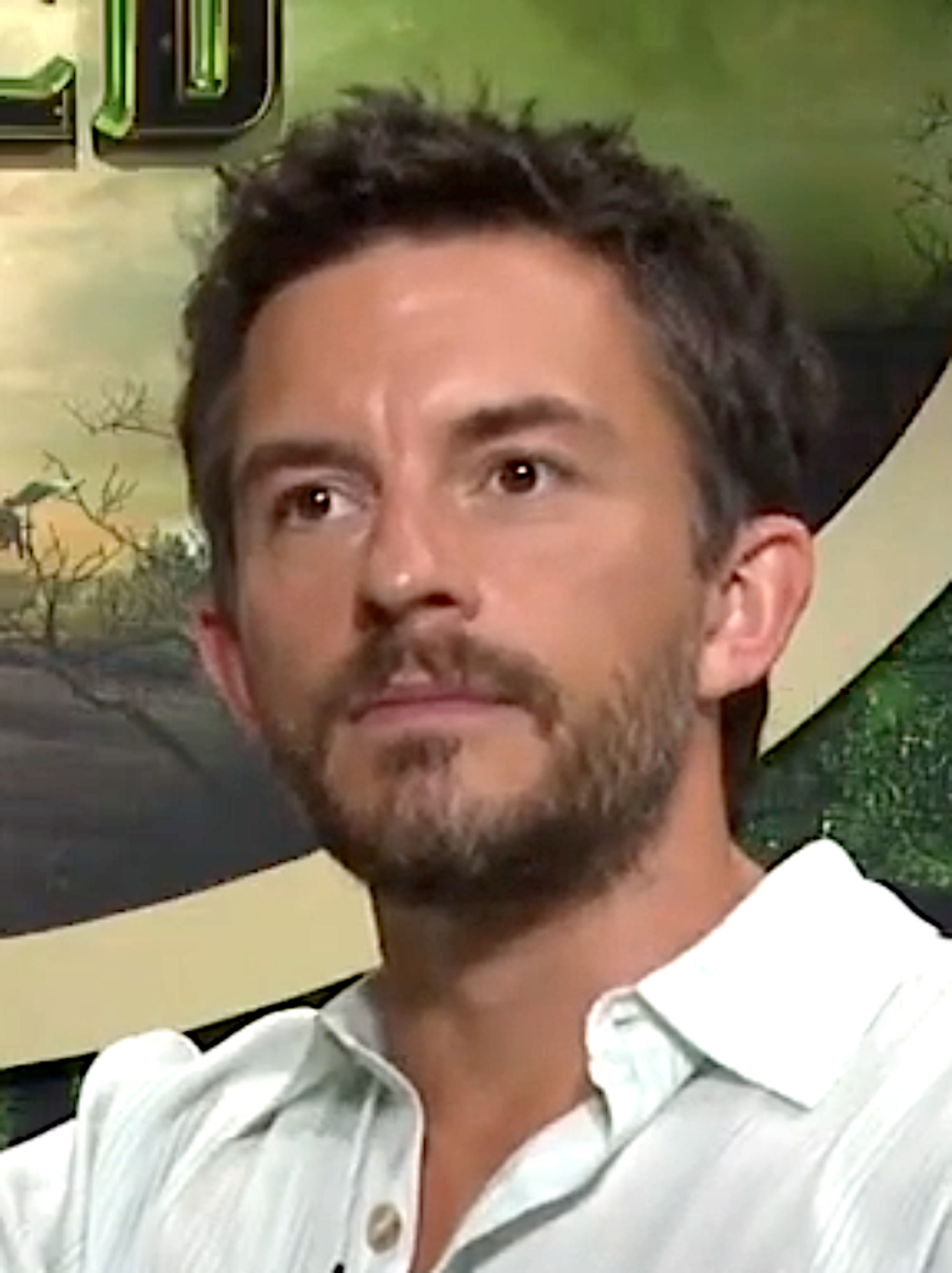
Jonathan Bailey's performance of Anthony received praise from critics

Kristen Baldwin of Entertainment Weekly gave the series an A− writing, "With a second season that's more clever, moving, and emotionally complex than the first, this period drama... proves that it's not just a titillating trifle." The Hollywood Reporter's Angie Hahn echoed the sentiment describing the season as "older and wiser" than its predecessor's "rampant horniness" with an effective central romance that prioritized "a meeting of minds, played out over quick-witted arguments outside ballrooms and vicious competition during a friendly family game of pall-mall." Peter Travers of ABC praised the season writing, "Kudos to season two for digging deeper into the emotional lives of its characters and continuing the colorblind casting that creates a utopia in which diversity is so ingrained it's hardly worth a mention."

Alison Herman of The Ringer commented that Season 1 is "sexy without quite being erotic" while "Season 2 is the reverse. There's not a lot of sex, but in the crackling chemistry and relentless self-denial that defines Anthony and Kate's dynamic, there's plenty of eroticism." Emma Clarke of The Independent argued that, "it is precisely the lack of physicality that makes this season (of the show and of courtship) so... well, sexy." Scott Bryan of the BBC wrote that the season serves as antidote to the "always static, laboured and slow" period dramas, adding that it comes with "real energy, it feels so modern (even though it is set in the past) and even though it feels extravagant, it doesn't feel too highbrow. It is refreshingly accessible."

Kevin Fallon of The Daily Beast elaborating on Bailey's "exquisite lead performance," wrote that "he has an exceptional ability to carry his angst, pain, and guilt with him without bogging down things into a somber drag." The Telegraph's Anita Singh wrote that Bailey "brings more soul to the role of Lord Bridgerton than Page ever did with the Duke," with Randy Myers of Mercury News adding that Bailey "has a gift at comedic timing." Proma Khosla of Mashable concluded that with "Bailey and Ashley, Bridgerton Season 2 strikes gold" as they deliver "heaping, smoldering helpings of sexual tension" for "their chemistry is nothing short of explosive."

=== Audience viewership ===
The series premiered on March 25, 2022, and debuted number one in 92 countries on the platform. It was also the most viewed show on United States television screens for three weeks per Nielsen Media Research. Season 2 amassed 193 million viewing hours in its opening weekend, the highest opening for any English-language Netflix series at the time. It also broke the record for most viewed English-language series in a single week at that time, with 251.74 million viewing hours from March 28 to April 3. The first season also re-entered Netflix's top ten in second place. By April 19, Bridgerton's second season had overtaken its predecessor as the most watched English-language television series on Netflix at the time with 627.11 million hours viewed since its March 25, 2022, launch. This viewing numbers went up to 656.16 million by the 28-day mark.

Nielsen Media Research, analyzing the 2.55 billion minutes viewed on United States television screens in the first three days of season 2's availability (double all others across streamers for the week of March 21), characterized Bridgerton's audience as "diverse and broad". The firm found one third of viewers to be Hispanic or African American and an even split in popularity across the 18–34, 35–49, and 50–64 age groups at 25% each. The only exception was gender parity, with 76% of the audience reported to be female. It added 3.2 billion minutes viewed in its second week on top of the chart. It topped the chart for a third week with 1.6 billion minutes viewed.

=== Cultural impact ===
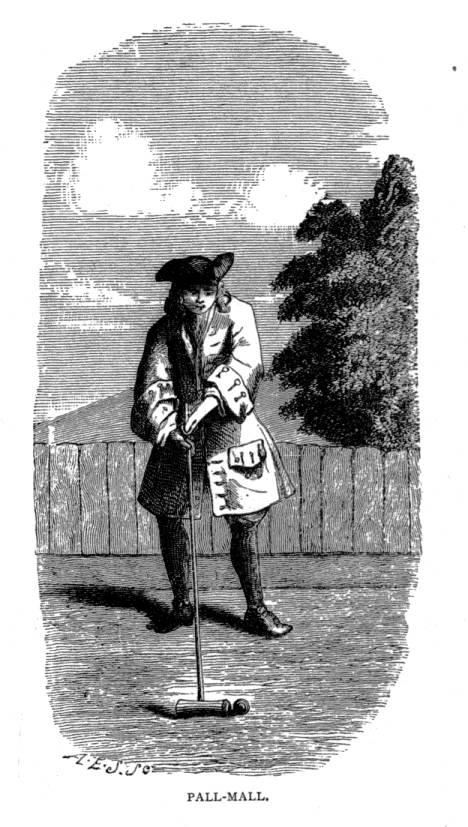
Pall-mall features as a pastime for the Bridgerton siblings in Season 2

An official "Queen's Ball" was held in Washington DC, Chicago, Montréal, and Los Angeles, with similar events and experiences taking place in London and Johannesburg. Bloomingdale's put together a Bridgerton-themed pop-up collection and tea bar, displaying real costumes from the series in the U.S. for the first time in its 59th Street windows.

After the season featured the main characters playing pall-mall, a lawn game considered to be the precursor to croquet, retailer John Lewis reported a 90% rise in sales for croquet sets. There was also a notable increase in internet searches and purchases of tiaras and corsets after season two's premiere.

Stately homes around England saw an uptick in interest and visitors. Regarding Ranger's House, Chris Small of English Heritage said, "Since the launch of Bridgerton in 2020 we have seen many people who were previously unaware of the site inspired to visit." Walking tours of the filming locations of the series have also been created, including an official one by Netflix. Castle Howard opened an exhibition titled Castle Howard on Screen: From Brideshead to Bridgerton in May 2022.

The 33rd season finale episode of The Simpsons on May 22, 2022, featured Marge and her friends watching a period drama called "Tunnelton" with a Lady Whistledown-sounding narrator, and a character emerging drenched from a lake, like Anthony in the fifth episode of the second season. The writers of the Doctor Who episode "Rogue" took great inspiration from Bridgerton as the episode revolves around intrigue and romance at an English country party in 1813, with the show being directly referenced by main character Ruby Sunday.
