= High Wire =

High Wire may refer to:

- "High Wire" (song), by Men at Work (1983)
- High Wire (Rob Brown album), 1996
- High Wire (Ernie Isley album), 1990
- High Wire (2020 film), winner of a 2020 DGC Allan King Award for Best Documentary Film
- High Wire (2025 film), a film starring Isabella Wei

== See also ==
- Highwire (disambiguation)
- Tightrope walking
