= HIW =

HIW or Hiw may refer to:

== Places ==
- Hiw, or Hu, Egypt
- Hiroshima-Nishi Airport, by IATA code
- Hiw (island), the northernmost island of Vanuatu

== Others ==
- Hiw language, spoken on the island of Hiw (Vanuatu)
- Hizb al-Ikha al-Watani, an Iraqi political party in the 1930s
- Highwire (protein), an E3 Ubiquitin Ligase frequently studied in Drosophila
- High Impact Wrestling Canada, a wrestling promotion
