= List of Bridgerton characters =

Bridgerton is a period drama television series created by Chris Van Dusen and produced by Shondaland for Netflix. It is based on the Regency romance literary series by Julia Quinn set in London's ton during the season, when debutantes are presented at court.

== Family tree ==
† Edmund, 8th Viscount Bridgerton	Violet, Dowager Viscountess; Bridgerton
Anthony Bridgerton, 9th Viscount Bridgerton	Benedict Bridgerton	Colin Bridgerton	Daphne Basset (née Bridgerton), Duchess of Hastings	Eloise Bridgerton	Francesca Stirling (née Bridgerton), Countess of Kilmartin	Gregory Bridgerton	Hyacinth Bridgerton
Kathani "Kate" Bridgerton (née Sharma), Viscountess Bridgerton	Sophie Bridgerton (née Gun; née Baek)	Penelope Bridgerton (née Featherington)	Simon Basset, Duke of Hastings	† John Stirling, Earl of Kilmartin

† denotes a deceased character

== Cast ==
= Main cast (credited)
= Recurring cast (3+)
= Guest cast (1-2)

=== Main cast ===
Actor	Character	Bridgerton					Queen Charlotte
Actor	Character	Season 1	Season 2	Season 3	Season 4	Season 5	Queen Charlotte
Adjoa Andoh	Lady Agatha Danbury	Main	Main	Main	Main	Main	Main
Arsema Thomas	Lady Agatha Danbury						Main
Lorraine Ashbourne	Mrs. Varley	Main	Main	Main	Main		
Jonathan Bailey	Anthony Bridgerton	Main	Main	Main	Main	Main	
Ruby Barker	Marina Crane (née Thompson)	Main	Guest				
Sabrina Bartlett	Siena Rosso	Main					
Harriet Cains	Philippa Finch (née Featherington)	Main	Main	Main	Guest		
Bessie Carter	Prudence Dankworth (née Featherington)	Main	Main	Main			
Nicola Coughlan	Penelope Bridgerton (née Featherington)	Main	Main	Main	Main	Main	
Phoebe Dynevor	Daphne Basset (née Bridgerton)	Main	Main				
Ruth Gemmell	Violet Bridgerton (née Ledger)	Main	Main	Main	Main	Main	Main
Connie Jenkins-Greig	Violet Bridgerton (née Ledger)						Recurring
Florence Hunt	Hyacinth Bridgerton	Main	Main	Main	Main	Main	
Martins Imhangbe	Will Mondrich	Main	Main	Main	Main	Main	
Claudia Jessie	Eloise Bridgerton	Main	Main	Main	Main	Main	
Ben Miller	Archibald Featherington	Main					
Luke Newton	Colin Bridgerton	Main	Main	Main	Main	Main	
Regé-Jean Page	Simon Basset	Main					
Golda Rosheuvel	Queen Charlotte	Main	Main	Main	Main	Main	Main
India Amarteifio	Queen Charlotte						Main
Luke Thompson	Benedict Bridgerton	Main	Main	Main	Main	Main	
Will Tilston	Gregory Bridgerton	Main	Main	Main	Main	Main	
Polly Walker	Lady Portia Featherington	Main	Main	Main	Main		
Julie Andrews (voice)	Lady Whistledown	Main	Main	Main	Main	Main	Main
Simone Ashley	Kate Bridgerton (née Sharma)		Main	Main	Main	Main	
Charithra Chandran	Edwina Sharma		Main				
Shelley Conn	Lady Mary Sharma		Main				
Calam Lynch	Theo Sharpe		Main				
Rupert Young	Jack Featherington		Main				
Victor Alli	John Stirling			Main	Main		
Joanna Bobin	Lady Araminta Cowper	Recurring	Recurring	Main			
Dominic Coleman	Lord Cowper		Recurring	Main			
Ruby Stokes	Francesca Stirling (née Bridgerton)	Recurring	Recurring				
Hannah Dodd	Francesca Stirling (née Bridgerton)			Main	Main	Main	
Daniel Francis	Lord Marcus Anderson			Main	Main		
Jessica Madsen	Lady Cressida Gun (née Cowper)	Recurring	Recurring	Main	Main		
Hannah New	Lady Tilley Arnold			Main			
Masali Baduza	Michaela Stirling			Guest	Main	Main	
Yerin Ha	Sophie Bridgerton (née Baek)				Main		
Katie Leung	Lady Araminta Gun				Main		
Emma Naomi	Alice Mondrich	Recurring	Recurring	Recurring	Main	Main	
Hugh Sachs	Brimsley	Recurring	Recurring	Recurring	Main	Main	Main
Sam Clemmett	Brimsley						Main
Tega Alexander	Christopher Anderson					Main	
Jacqueline Boatswain	Helen Stirling					Main	
Gemma Knight Jones	Lady Elizabeth Ashworth					Main	
James Fleet	King George III	Guest	Guest				Guest
Corey Mylchreest	King George III						Main
Michelle Fairley	Princess Augusta						Main
Freddie Dennis	Reynolds						Main

=== Recurring cast ===
Actor	Character	Bridgerton				Queen Charlotte
Actor	Character	Season 1	Season 2	Season 3	Season 4	Queen Charlotte
Molly McGlynn	Rose Nolan	Recurring				
Jason Barnett	Jeffries	Recurring				
Geraldine Alexander	Mrs. Wilson	Recurring	Recurring	Recurring	Recurring	
Kathryn Drysdale	Genevieve Delacroix	Recurring	Recurring	Recurring		
Oli Higginson	Footman John	Recurring	Recurring	Recurring	Recurring	
Simon Ludders	Humboldt	Recurring			Guest	
Julian Ovenden	Sir Henry Granville	Recurring				
Caleb Obediah	Lord Cho		Recurring	Recurring	Recurring	
Bert Seymour	Lord Fife		Recurring	Recurring	Recurring	
Esme Coy	Margaret Goring		Recurring	Recurring		
Jessie Baek	Mary Ann Hallewell		Recurring	Recurring	Recurring	
Lorn Macdonald	Albion Finch	Guest	Guest	Recurring	Guest	
Sam Phillips	Lord Debling			Recurring		
Banita Sandhu	Sita Malhotra			Recurring		
James Phoon	Harry Dankworth			Recurring	Guest	
Genevieve Chenneour	Clara Livingston			Recurring		
Kitty Devlin	Dolores Allison (née Stowell)			Recurring	Recurring	
Rosa Hesmondhalgh	Rae			Recurring	Recurring	
Sesly Hope	Emma Cho (née Kenworthy)			Recurring	Recurring	
Vineeta Rishi	Lady Malhotra			Recurring	Recurring	
Anna Wilson-Jones	Lady Livingston			Recurring		
Sophie Woolley	Lady Stowell			Recurring		
Ella Bruccoleri	Winifred Barragan			Recurring		
Sam Battersea	Lady Barragan			Recurring		
Molly Jackson-Shaw	Anne Hartigan			Recurring		
Lucas Aurelio	Paul Suarez			Recurring		
Sophie Lamont	Celia			Recurring	Recurring	Recurring
Joanne Henry	Lady Keswick			Recurring	Recurring	
James Bradwell	Lord Basilio			Recurring	Recurring	
James Duke	Minister Hughes			Recurring	Recurring	
Edward Bennett	Walter Dundas			Recurring	Recurring	
Michelle Mao	Rosamund Li				Recurring	
Isabella Wei	Posy Li				Recurring	
David Moorst	Alfie Barrow				Recurring	
Fiona Marr	Irma Gibbons				Recurring	
Gracie McGonigal	Hazel				Recurring	
Cai Brigden	Mr. Hiscox				Recurring	
Francesca Lara Gordon	Miss Virginia				Recurring	
Esh Alladi	Hatch				Recurring	
Jude Powell	Lord Allison				Guest	
Tunji Kasim	Duke Adolphus					Recurring
Cyril Nri	Lord Herman Danbury					Recurring
Peyvand Sadeghian	Coral					Recurring
Ryan Gage	George, Prince of Wales					Recurring
Joshua Riley	Prince Adolphus					Recurring
Jack Michael Stacey	Prince Edward					Recurring
Seamus Dillane	Prince William					Recurring
Ben Cura	Prince Augustus					Recurring
Eliza Capel	Princess Sophia					Recurring
Neil Edmond	Earl Harcourt					Recurring
Richard Cunningham	Lord Bute					Recurring
Guy Henry	Doctor John Monro					Recurring
Keir Charles	Lord Ledger					Recurring

== Bridgerton family ==
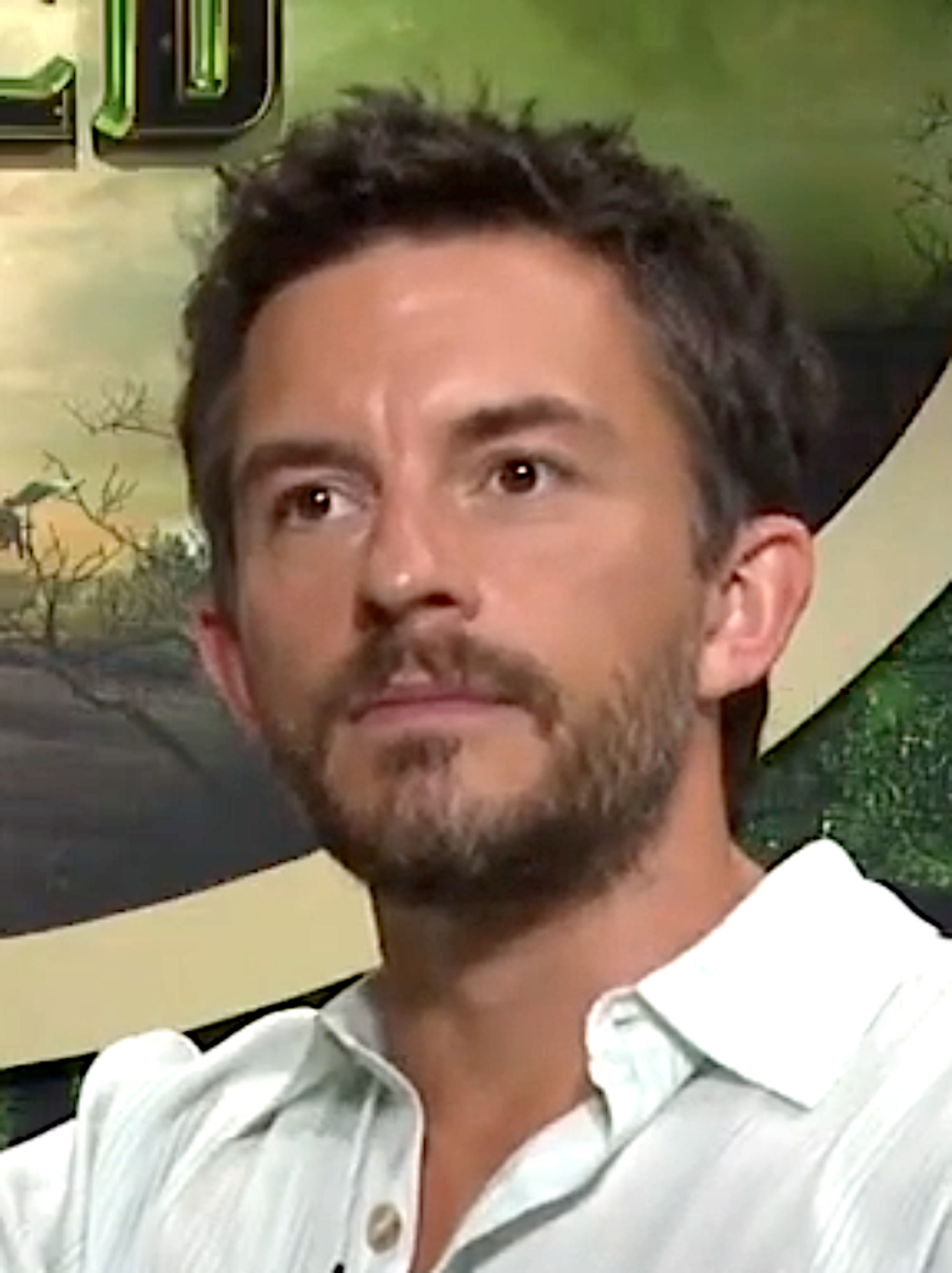
Jonathan Bailey plays Anthony, 9th Viscount Bridgerton

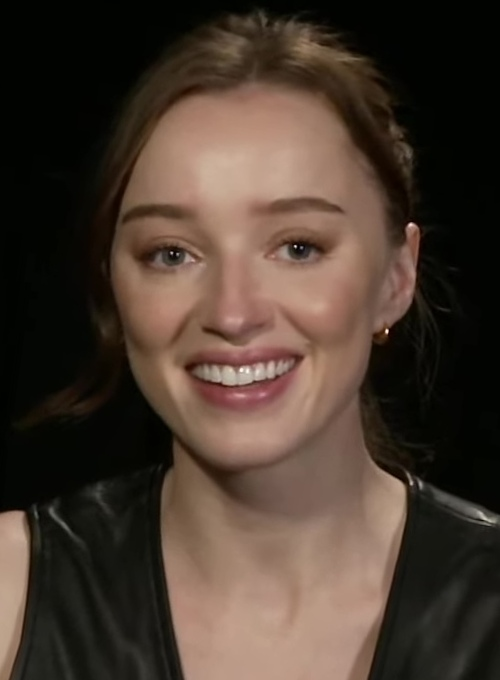
Phoebe Dynevor plays Daphne Basset (née Bridgerton)

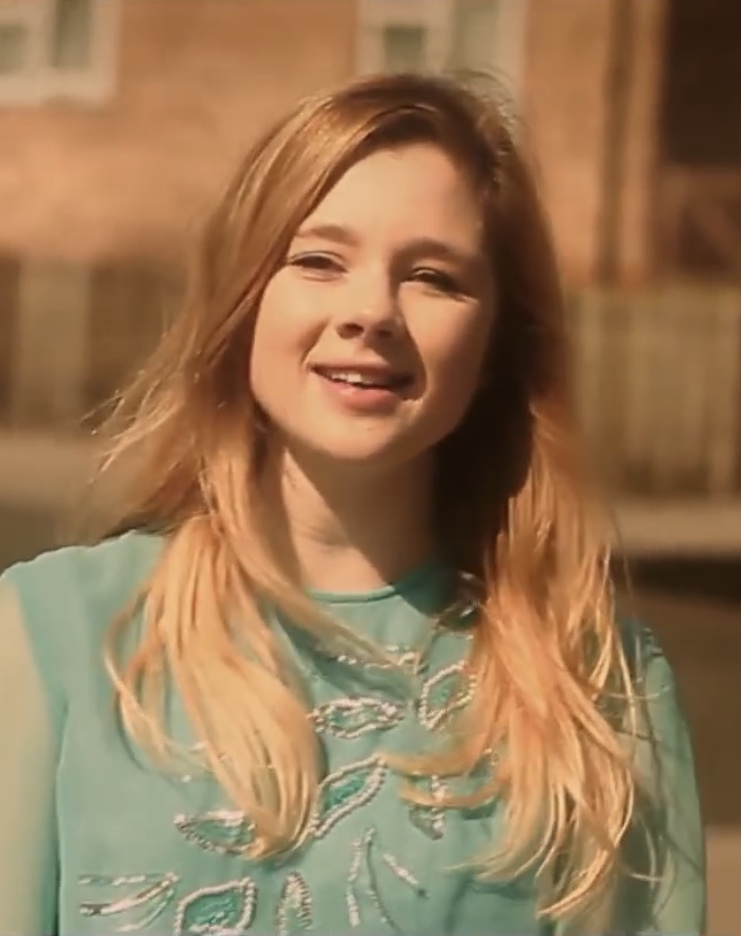
Claudia Jessie plays Eloise Bridgerton

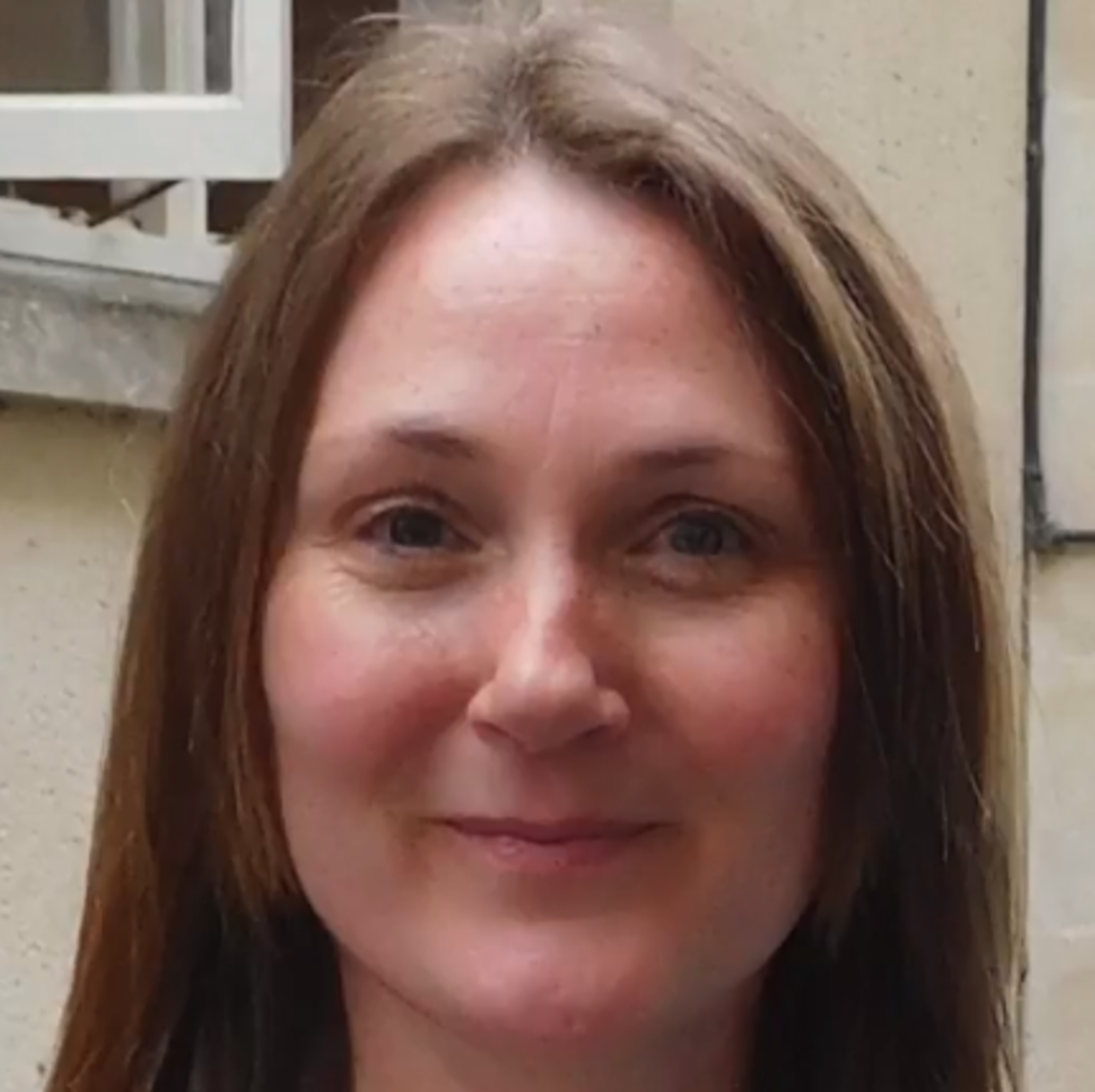
Ruth Gemmell plays Violet Bridgerton (née Ledger)

The Bridgertons are a tight-knit and well-respected family in the ton, composed of the widow and eight children of the late Edmund, 8th Viscount Bridgerton. They live between Bridgerton House in Mayfair and Aubrey Hall, their country home, in Kent.

- Anthony Bridgerton, 9th Viscount Bridgerton (played by Jonathan Bailey) is the eldest Bridgerton child and the head of the family. He became Viscount at a young age after witnessing the sudden death of his father, which left him traumatised, closed-off, and fearful of love and loss. Anthony is the lead character of the second novel, The Viscount Who Loved Me, and of the second season of the series.
- Benedict Bridgerton (played by Luke Thompson) is the second eldest Bridgerton child. As the "spare" of the family, he is less concerned with conforming to society and discovers a passion for art and a more bohemian lifestyle. Benedict is the lead character of the third novel, An Offer from a Gentleman, and of the fourth season of the series.
- Colin Bridgerton (played by Luke Newton) is the third Bridgerton child. He struggles with a lack of purpose and spends much of his time travelling. Colin is the lead character of the fourth novel, Romancing Mister Bridgerton, and of the third season of the series.
- Daphne Basset, Duchess of Hastings (née Bridgerton), (played by Phoebe Dynevor) is the fourth Bridgerton child and eldest daughter of the family. In the books, she is in her second season and lacks worthy suitors because most men consider her "too friendly"; in the series, she is the season's "incomparable", a highly sought after debutante, whose chances at a match are repeatedly sabotaged by her overprotective brother Anthony. Daphne is the lead character of the first novel, The Duke and I, and of the first season of the series.
- Eloise Bridgerton (played by Claudia Jessie) is the fifth Bridgerton child. Her debut takes place in season 2. She is frustrated by her limited options as a woman and would rather educate herself than engage with the season or settle down. Eloise is the lead character of the fifth novel, To Sir Phillip with Love.
- Francesca Stirling, Dowager Countess of Kilmartin (née Bridgerton), (played by Ruby Stokes in seasons 1–2, and Hannah Dodd in season 3–) is the sixth Bridgerton child. She is more reserved than the rest of her family and spends most of the first two seasons away practicing pianoforte. Her debut takes place in season 3. Francesca is the lead character of the sixth novel, When He Was Wicked, and of the fifth season of the series.
- Gregory Bridgerton (played by Will Tilston) is the seventh Bridgerton child and youngest son of the family. Gregory is the lead character of the eighth and final novel, On the Way to the Wedding.
- Hyacinth Bridgerton (played by Florence Hunt) is the eighth and youngest Bridgerton child. Despite her young age, she often tries to involve herself in the exploits of her older siblings. Hyacinth is the lead character of the seventh novel, It's In His Kiss.
- Violet Bridgerton, Dowager Viscountess Bridgerton (née Ledger), (played by Ruth Gemmell in Bridgerton, and Connie Jenkins-Greig as the young Violet in the prequel) is the mother to the Bridgerton children and Edmund's widow. She had a poor reaction to her husband's premature death and became emotionally absent, but has since transformed into a loving and protective matriarch for her family, though she occasionally lacks awareness of her children's deeper anxieties.
- Edmund Bridgerton, 8th Viscount Bridgerton^{†} (played by Rupert Evans in a flashback) was the father of the Bridgerton children and Violet's husband. He unexpectedly died in 1803 from an allergic reaction to a bee sting.
- The Bridgerton grandchildren thus far include Edmund Bridgerton, the heir to the Viscountcy, named after his grandfather and the first child of Anthony and Kate Bridgerton, the Viscount and Viscountess Bridgerton; August "Augie" Basset, the heir to the dukedom and first child of Simon and Daphne Basset; and Elliot Bridgerton, the current Baron Featherington and first child and son of Colin and Penelope Bridgerton.

== Love interests ==
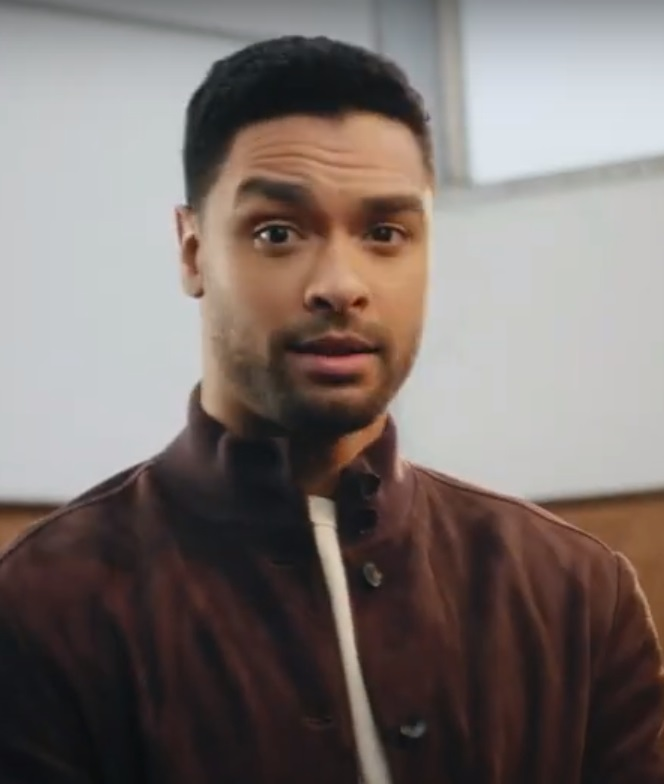
Regé-Jean Page plays Simon Basset

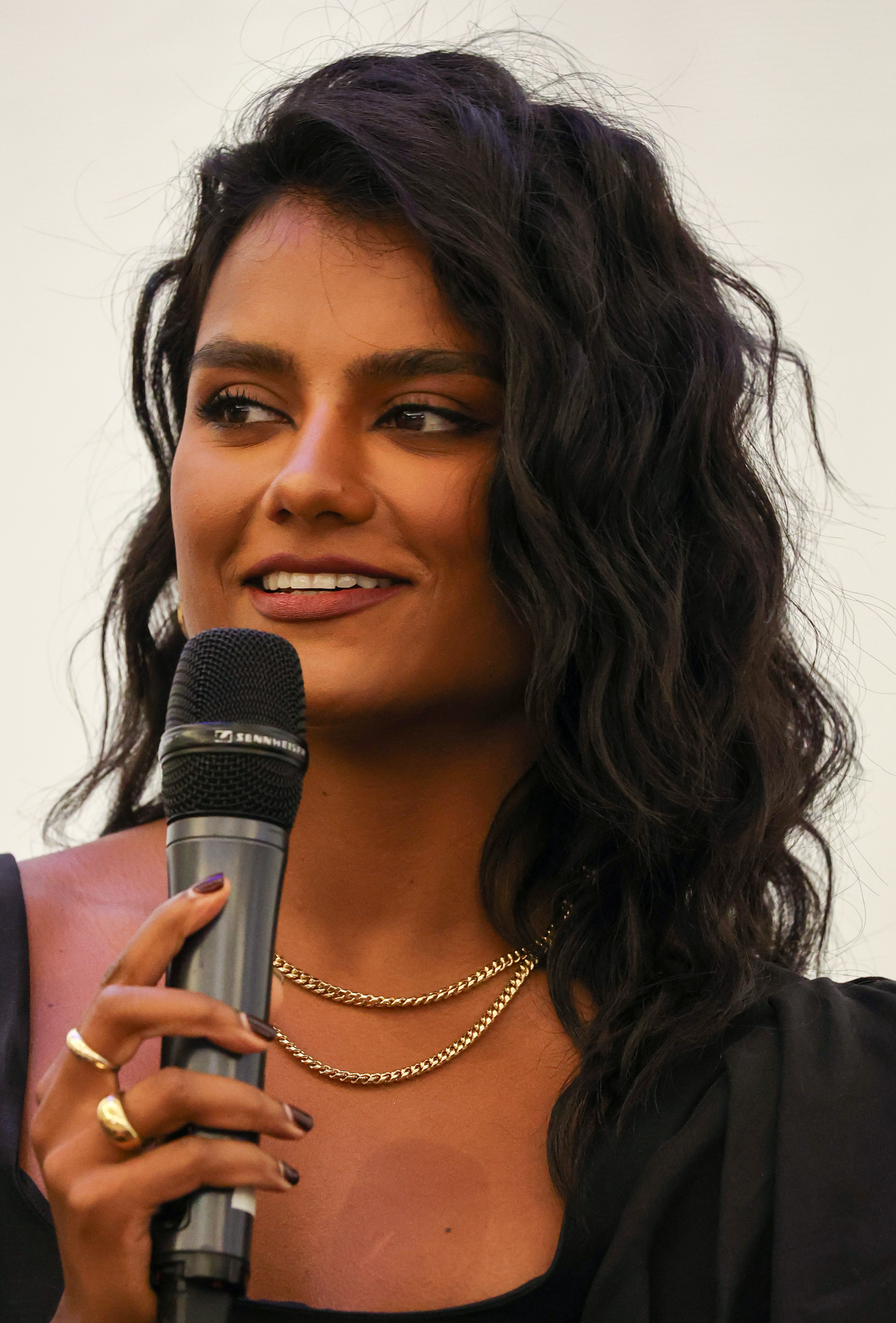
Simone Ashley plays Kate Bridgerton (née Sharma)

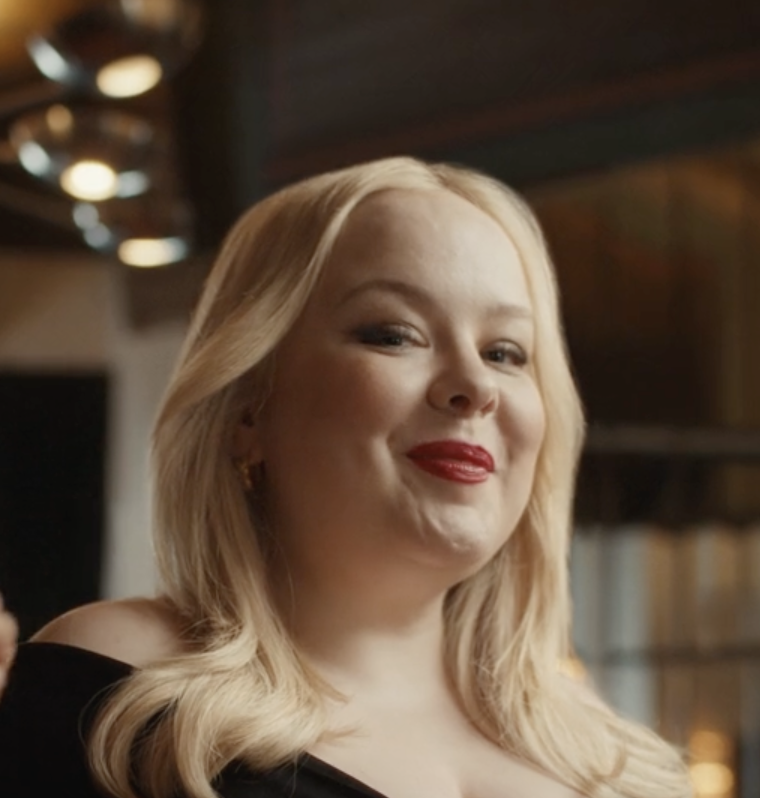
Nicola Coughlan plays Penelope Bridgerton (née Featherington)

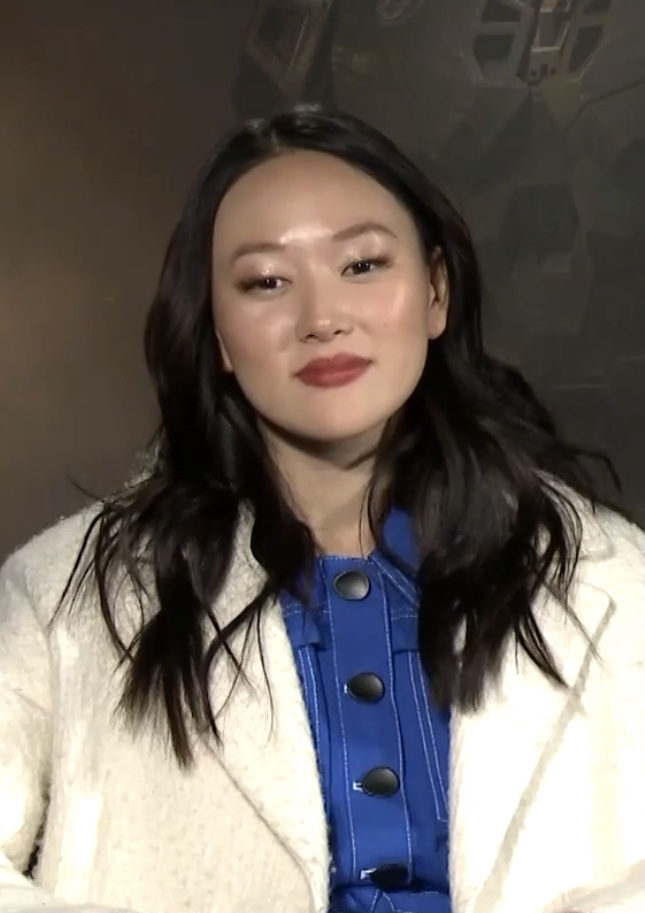
Yerin Ha plays Sophie Bridgerton (née Baek)

- Simon Basset, Duke of Hastings (played by Regé-Jean Page) is an eligible suitor who returns to London during the season, having sworn against marriage and children due to a vow he made to his abusive father on the latter's deathbed. He makes a pact with Daphne Bridgerton to feign a courtship to serve both their interests, leading to a growing attraction between them. In the books, he becomes a supporting character after the first novel; however, Page exited the series after the first season with Simon occasionally mentioned in passing.
- Kathani "Kate" Bridgerton, Viscountess Bridgerton (née Sharma), (played by Simone Ashley) is, in the series, a newcomer to the ton from India and a designated "spinster" at the age of 26; in the books, the character's name is Katharine Grace Sheffield and she is the daughter of a baron's younger son from Somerset. While trying to prevent Anthony Bridgerton from courting her younger sister Edwina, Kate and Anthony are drawn to each other, to the initial horror of both. In the series, like Anthony, Kate had to step up to raise her sister after their father's death and carries the burden of responsibility in her family.
- Penelope Bridgerton (née Featherington) (played by Nicola Coughlan) is a friend of Eloise Bridgerton who lives in the house across the road. In the series, she is the youngest Featherington daughter; in the books, there is a fourth daughter, Felicity. A seemingly naïve wallflower, Pen is revealed to be the anonymous gossip columnist Lady Whistledown (narrated by Julie Andrews) at the end of the first season, something not revealed by the books until the fourth novel. She has harboured a secret infatuation for Eloise's brother Colin for many years.
- Sophie Bridgerton (née Baek) (played by Yerin Ha) is a maid "who’s been forced to spend much of her life working for the most demanding employer in the ton." She is the illegitimate daughter of the Earl of Penwood and was forced to become a maid by her cruel stepmother after the earl's untimely death. In the books, the character's name is Sophia Maria Beckett.
- Sir Philip Crane (played by Chris Fulton) (Sir Phillip in the books) is a baronet and the younger brother of Marina Thompson's lover George. After George dies in battle, Philip takes it upon himself to marry Marina to care for her and her children. He has a keen interest in botany. In the books, he is introduced in the fifth novel as a recent widower and single father.
- John Stirling, Earl of Kilmartin (played by Victor Alli) meets Francesca Bridgerton during her debut in season 3, and they bond over their shared introversion. In the books, John and Francesca marry at some point after An Offer From a Gentleman and before Romancing Mister Bridgerton. They have a genuine and uncomplicated love, which makes Francesca feel guilty for finding love again after his death.
- Michaela Stirling (played by Masali Baduza) is the outgoing cousin of John Stirling. She travels with the newly-wedded Francesca and John to Scotland at the end of season 3, along with Eloise. She represents a gender-swapped Michael Stirling from the books, the love interest of When He Was Wicked.
- Gareth St. Clair is the heir to the Baron St. Clair, and a grandson of Lady Danbury. He is the love interest of Hyacinth from It's In His Kiss.
- Lady Lucinda "Lucy" Abernathy is the daughter of the 8th Earl of Fennsworth, and the younger sister of Richard Abernathy, the 9th and current Earl of Fennsworth. She appears as Gregory's love interest in On the Way to the Wedding.

== Family members ==
- Portia, Dowager Baroness Featherington (played by Polly Walker) is the matriarch of the Featherington family, known for her tacky fashion sense and various schemes to marry off her daughters. Her desperation to be seen as an important and respectable member of the ton often lands her in hot water.
- Prudence Dankworth (née Featherington) (played by Bessie Carter) and Philippa Finch (née Featherington) (played by Harriet Cains) are the older Featherington daughters. Philippa marries Albion Finch^{◊} (played by Lorn Macdonald), and Prudence marries Harry Dankworth^{◊} (played by James Phoon) in the series. They are somewhat air-headed, often to Portia’s misery. They are often rude or even cruel to Penelope, but eventually become closer as a family. In the books, Philippa marries Nigel Berbrooke, while Prudence marries Robert Huxley. The novel series also includes a fourth Featherington daughter, Felicity, who is Penelope's younger sister and Hyacinth's best friend; she marries Geoffrey Albansdale.
- Marina, Lady Crane (née Thompson) (played by Ruby Barker) is, in the series, a Featherington cousin from a rural gentry family. Her lover George Crane left her pregnant when he went off to war, and died before he could fulfill his intention to marry her. She tries to marry Colin to cover up her pregnancy and ensure her child's wellbeing, but the plan falls through when Lady Whistledown exposes her. She later accepts the proposal of George's brother Sir Philip and gives birth to twins Oliver and Amanda. In the books, Marina is a Bridgerton cousin who dies of pneumonia before the events of To Sir Phillip with Love.
- Archibald, Baron Featherington^{†} (played by Ben Miller) is the head of the Featherington family and a known gambler. Already deceased in the books, he appears in the first season of the series.
- Jack, Baron Featherington^{◊} (played by Rupert Young) is a cousin of Archibald and the presumed heir to the Featherington estate upon the latter's death. He is a conman who claims to own ruby mines in America, which are later revealed to be unprofitable and the rubies, counterfeit.
- Edwina Sharma (played by Charithra Chandran) (Sheffield in the books) is Mary's daughter and Kate's younger half-sister, a sheltered yet ambitious "diamond of the season". She has many suitors but chooses to court Anthony Bridgerton, much to Kate's dismay and despite Anthony's stated lack of interest in a love match. In the novel, despite Anthony's courtship, Edwina notices the attraction between him and Kate, and is thrilled when they later marry. She loves books and falls for (and later marries) Mr. Bagwell, a scholar. In the show, more naive and attached to the idea of becoming viscountess, she does not notice until the last minute, causing a temporary rift between her and Kate.

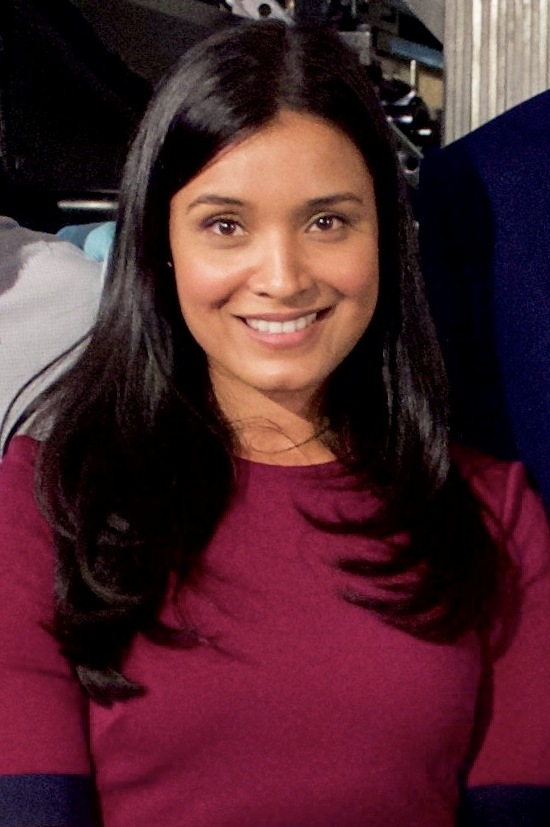
Shelley Conn

- Lady Mary Sharma (née Sheffield) (played by Shelley Conn) (Sheffield in the books) is Edwina's mother and Kate's stepmother. In the series, she refused a more eligible suitor in order to marry Kate's father, a secretary from India, and is nervous about returning to England. She is kind but oblivious, leaving Kate in charge of the family's practical matters.
- Lord and Lady Sheffield (played by Anthony Head and Shobu Kapoor) are Mary's parents and Edwina's grandparents in the series. They disapproved of Mary’s marriage to Kate’s father and shun both her and Kate. In the books, Kate and Edwina's father is surnamed Sheffield, and Mary is a Sheffield by marriage.
- The Duke of Hastings^{†} and Sarah Basset, Duchess of Hastings^{†} (played by Richard Pepple and Daphne di Cinto in flashbacks) are Simon's parents. Simon's mother died in childbirth, and his father put a great deal of pressure on his son and shamed him for having a stutter in his youth.

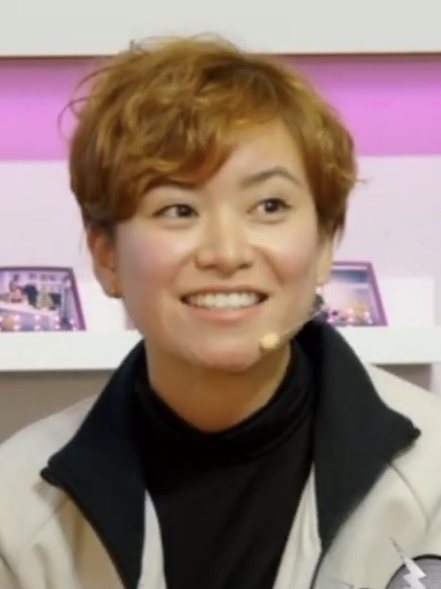
Katie Leung

- Lady Araminta Gun, Dowager Countess of Penwood (played by Katie Leung) (Gunningworth in the books) is the mother of Rosamund and Posy Li. After the death of Lord Penwood, Araminta kept Sophie at Penwood House as an unpaid servant and treats her cruelly.
- Rosamund Li (played by Michelle Mao) (Reiling in the books) is Araminta's older daughter, who is beautiful, vain and resolute with getting what she wants.
- Posy Li (played by Isabella Wei) (Reiling in the books) is Araminta's younger daughter, who is kinder and more friendly, and often ignored by her mother.
- Richard Gun, 6th Earl of Penwood^{†} (played by Arthur Lee) (Gunningworth in the books) is Sophie's father and Araminta's second husband. He appears in a flashback.

== Royalty ==
The royals are only in the background of the books. Queen Charlotte was expanded upon in Bridgerton, becoming the subject of the prequel Queen Charlotte: A Bridgerton Story and its novelisation penned by Shonda Rhimes and Julia Quinn. Although they are based on real-life historical figures, the depiction of royal characters in the two series is largely fictional.

- Queen Charlotte (played by Golda Rosheuvel in Bridgerton, and India Amarteifio in the prequel) is based on the real life queen consort Charlotte of Mecklenburg-Strelitz. She greets the debutantes at the start of each season and is determined to discover who is behind Lady Whistledown.
- Prince Friedrich of Prussia (played by Freddie Stroma) is Queen Charlotte's nephew who courts Daphne in the first season of the series.
- King George III (played by James Fleet in Bridgerton, and Corey Mylchreest in the prequel) is based on the real king. As in real life, he has gone mad by the time of Bridgerton.

== Members of the ton ==
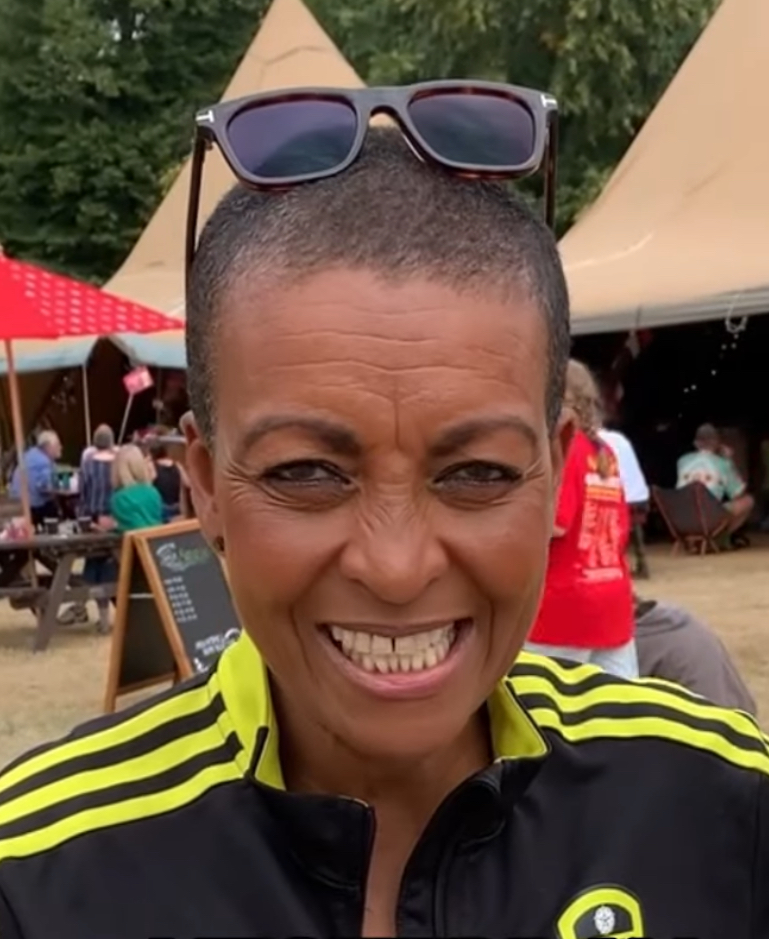
Adjoa Andoh plays Lady Danbury

- Lady Agatha Danbury (née Soma Anderson) (played by Adjoa Andoh in Bridgerton, and Arsema Thomas in the prequel) is an insightful doyenne and powerful matron of the ton. She mentored Simon Basset growing up. She later sponsors Mary and her daughters' stay in London as a favour for an old friend. In the books, Lady Danbury gets along well with Hyacinth Bridgerton, who reads pulp novels to her. In the prequel series, young Agatha was unhappily married to an older man, and had an affair with Lord Ledger after her husband's death.
- Lady Cressida Gun, Countess of Penwood (née Cowper) (played by Jessica Madsen) is a snooty member of the ton. Cressida competes with Daphne Bridgerton in the 1813 season for the affections of Prince Friedrich, and threatens to expose Daphne's kiss with Simon Basset in the garden. Later, she takes interest in Jack Featherington, believing him to be wealthy. Season 3 gives Cressida a more sympathetic portrayal. At risk of being married off to a fun-hating elderly man, she falsely claims credit for Lady Whistledown. Season 4 sees the return of Cressida married and as the new Lady Penwood.
- Lady Cowper (played by Joanna Bobin) is the gossipy mother to Cressida who desperately grows weary of having her daughter not meet a match.
- Nigel, Baron Berbrooke (played by Jamie Beamish) is a baron who courts Daphne in the first book and first season and tries to corner her into marriage. Caroline Quentin plays Nigel's mother Lady Berbrooke^{◊}.
- Sir Henry Granville^{◊} (played by Julian Ovenden) is an artist who introduces Benedict to the bohemian underworld in the first season of the series. He is gay, in an open marriage with his wife Lucy^{◊} (played by Sandra Teles) and secret relationship with Lord Wetherby^{◊} (played by Ned Porteous).
- Lord Lumley^{◊} (played by Louis Gaunt) courts Edwina with his knowledge and talent in poetry.
- Thomas Dorset^{◊} (played by Sam Frenchum) went to Oxford with Anthony, who enlists Dorset to distract Kate from Edwina. He later shows interest in her and invites her on a boat ride, making Anthony jealous.
- Other members of the ton in the first two seasons include Kitty Langham^{◊} (played by Céline Buckens), Lady Trowbridge^{◊} (played by Amy Beth Hayes), Lord Fife^{◊} (played by Bert Seymour) and Lord Cho^{◊} (played by Caleb Obediah).
- Lord Alfred Debling^{◊} (played by Sam Phillips) is a horticulturalist and great auk conservationist who courts Penelope Featherington in season 3.
- Lord Samadani^{◊} (played by David Mumeni) is Queen Charlotte's friend from Vienna and a marquess. She attempts to set him up with Francesca Bridgerton, as they both have seven siblings.
- Lord Marcus Anderson^{◊} (played by Daniel Francis) is Lady Danbury's brother who comes to London from the countryside for a change and grows close to Violet Bridgerton. He is briefly engaged to her in season 4, but she turns him down after deciding to rediscover who she is outside of being a wife and mother.
- Lady Tilley Arnold^{◊} (played by Hannah New) is a widow whom Benedict befriends and has an affair with. She has no wish to remarry and is happy to control her late husband's estate.

== Working class ==
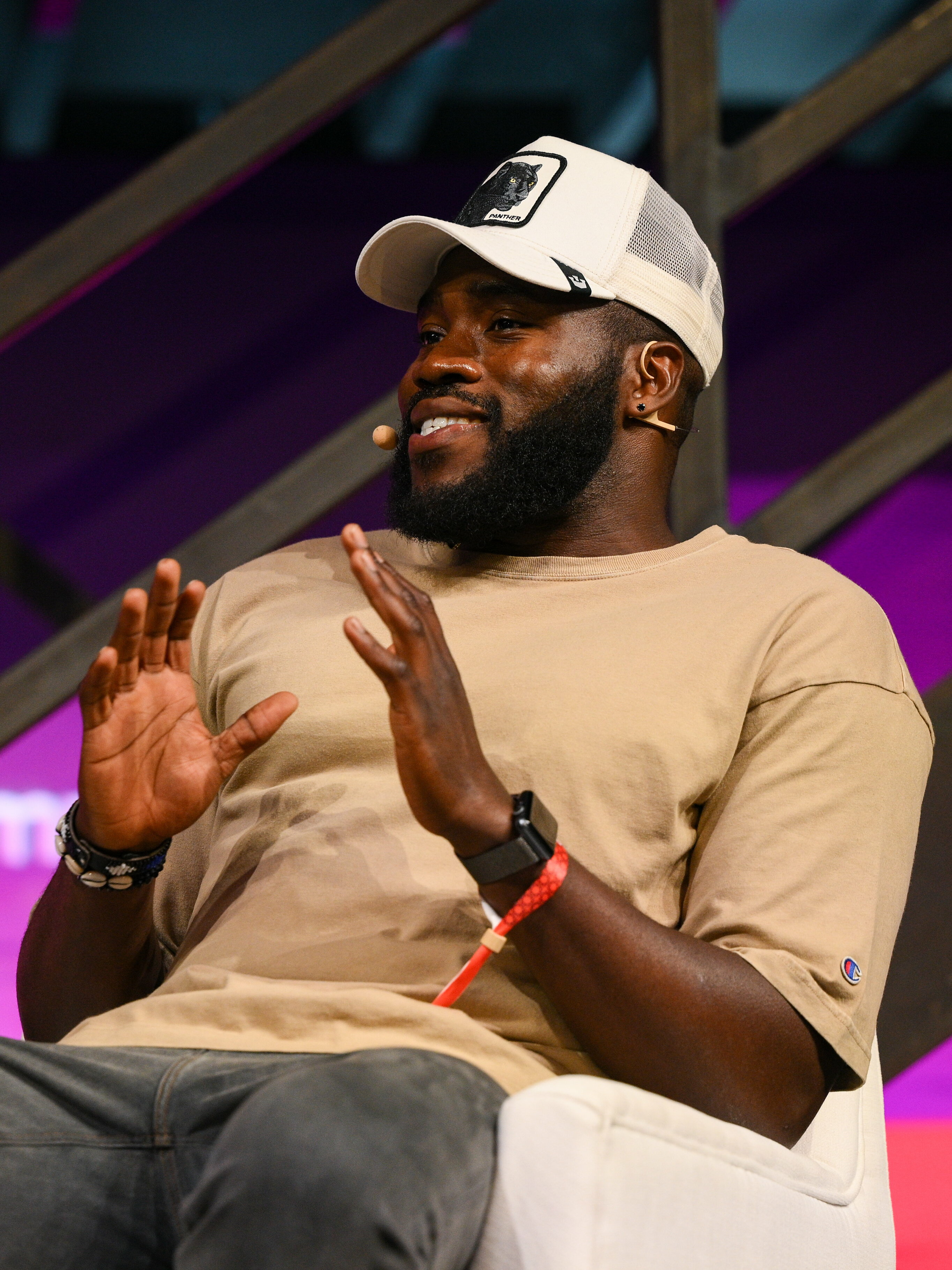
Martins Imhangbe

- Will Mondrich^{◊} (played by Martins Imhangbe) is a boxer and Simon Basset's friend. He is based on the real life boxer from the time Bill Richmond, his name being a spoonerism. He retires from boxing and later starts his own gentleman's club with his wife Alice. After the death of Alice's distant aunt, their son inherits the title Baron of Kent, making the family new members of the ton.
- Alice Mondrich^{◊} (played by Emma Naomi) is Will Mondrich's wife and mother to the new Baron of Kent. She later on becomes the Queen's lady-in-waiting at Lady Danbury's request.
- Siena Rosso (played by Sabrina Bartlett) is an opera singer and Anthony's mistress in the first season. Their tumultuous relationship comes to an end before he meets Kate and Edwina. In the book The Viscount Who Loved Me, her name is Maria Rosso, and she has a brief conversation with Anthony that Kate overhears.
- Madame Genevieve Delacroix^{◊} (played by Kathryn Drysdale) is the mysterious local modiste who fakes being French and makes dresses for the ladies of the ton. She has an affair with Benedict in the first season. In the second, she helps Penelope with her Lady Whistledown business.
- In season 2, Benedict has an affair with model Tessa^{◊} (played by Emily Barber).
- Theo Sharpe^{◊} (played by Calam Lynch) works at the print shop. Eloise meets him in season 2 while she investigates Lady Whistledown, and he introduces her to feminist texts and organizations. However, they are forced to stop seeing each other when Whistledown exposes Eloise for sneaking off unchaperoned to fraternise with "political radicals".

== Servants ==
- Brimsley^{◊} (played by Hugh Sachs in Bridgerton, and Sam Clemmett in the prequel) is the Queen's secretary. The prequel reveals that he is gay and had been in a relationship with the King's secretary Reynolds (played by Freddie Dennis). He is fiercely loyal to Charlotte, but will occasionally go behind her back if necessary.
- Rose Nolan^{◊} (played by Molly McGlynn) is Daphne's maid and confidant.
- Jeffries (played by Jason Barnett) is the Bassets' butler.
- Mrs Colson (played by Pippa Haywood) is the housekeeper of Clyvedon, the Bassets’ estate. She and Daphne initially butt heads, but eventually come to understand one another better.
- Mrs Varley^{◊} (played by Lorraine Ashbourne) is the Featheringtons' housekeeper and Portia's confidant. She is adept at forgery, a talent Portia often uses to her advantage.
- Mrs Wilson^{◊} (played by Geraldine Alexander) is the Bridgertons' housekeeper.
- Humboldt (played by Simon Ludders) is the Bridgertons' butler.
- John^{◊} (played by Oli Higginson) is a Bridgerton footman who is friends with Eloise. He befriends Sophie and takes romantic interest in Hazel when they come to work at Bridgerton House.
- Rae^{◊} (played by Rosa Hesmondhalgh) is Penelope's maid. She temporarily becomes the Featherington housekeeper in the fourth season after Varley quits.
- Irma Gibbons^{◊} (played by Fiona Marr) and Alfie Burrow^{◊} (played by David Moorst) are a Penwood cook and footman who are close friends with Sophie.
- The Crabtrees (played by Billy Boyle and Susan Brown) are the caretakers of Benedict's My Cottage country house.
- Hazel^{◊} (played by Gracie McGonigal) is a Bridgerton maid and Sophie's friend.

== Notes ==
- † – Character is deceased.
- ◊ – Series-only character.
