= Highwire =

Highwire may refer to:

- Highwire (protein)
- "Highwire" (song), by the Rolling Stones (1991)
- "Highwire", a song by Gin Blossoms on their 1996 album Congratulations I'm Sorry
- "Highwired", a song by Nebula on their 2022 album Transmission from Mothership Earth

== See also ==
- HighWire Press
- Tightrope walking
- High Wire (disambiguation)
