= Angus Wright (actor) =

British actor

- Born: 11 November 1964 (age 62); Washington, D.C., U.S.
- Education: University of Edinburgh (M.A.); Royal Central School of Speech and Drama
- Occupation: Actor
- Years active: 1990–present
- Partner(s): Lia Williams (2015–present)
- Parent: Patrick Wright (Father)

Angus Wright (born 11 November 1964) is a British actor.

== Early life and education ==
Angus Wright was born in Washington, D.C., the youngest child of Virginia and Patrick Wright. His father was in the British Diplomatic Service, so the family lived in many countries.

He gained an M.A. in art history at the University of Edinburgh and then trained at the Central School of Speech and Drama.He was a member of the university theatre company EUTC at Bedlam Theatre.

== Career ==
Wright has worked in theatre, film and television.

== Personal life ==
Wright's wife is Lia Williams.

== Acting credits ==
=== Film ===
Year	Film	Role
1994	Frankenstein	Guard
1995	First Knight	Marauder
1995	Cutthroat Island	Captain Trotter
1997	Jilting Joe	Mick
1999	RKO 281	Joseph Cotten
2000	All Forgotten	Boris
2001	Bridget Jones's Diary	Literary Figure
2001	The Affair of the Necklace	Henri Sanson
2001	Charlotte Gray	Secret Agent
2002	Nicholas Nickleby	Mr Pluck
2005	Kingdom of Heaven	Richard's Knight
2008	The Bank Job	Robert Rowlands
2011	The Iron Lady	John Nott
2012	Private Peaceful	Captain Barnes
2013	A Little Chaos	Sualem
2013	Closed Circuit	Andrew Altman
2014	Maleficent	King Henry's Advisor
2016	Rogue One	Hammerhead Captain
2018	The Rabbit's Foot	Lucky Francis
2018	The Little Stranger	Coroner Riddell
2019	Official Secrets	Mark Ellison
2020	The Courier	Dickie Franks
2020	The Witches	Waiter
2022	Pinocchio	Signore Rizzi
2022	See How They Run	Sergeant Bakewell
2022	Samovar (short)	Raoul Wallenberg
2022	Catherine Called Birdy	Fulk the Elder
2023	Bank of Dave	Clarence
2024	Here	Gilbert Moore, C.H.H.P

=== Radio ===
Year	Show	Role	Director	Producer
1990	Awarded a six month internship, via a Carleton Hobbs Bursary, to be a repertory member of the BBC's on-air Radio Drama Company			
2002	Precious	Geoff	Jane Morgan	Pier Productions
2008	Plenty	Sir Andrew Charleson	John Dove	Catherine Bailey Productions
2010	The Secret Pilgrim	Hansen	Patrick Rayner	BBC Radio 4

=== Television ===
Year	Series	Role	Notes
1993	Between the Lines	Motorcycle Officer	
1995	The Bill	Chief Inspector Wallace	
1996	Crocodile Shoes	Alan McGuire	
1997	The Painted Lady	Charles Stafford	
1998	Dalziel and Pascoe	Greg Waterson	
2000	Attachments	Ed Viner	
2001	Whistleblower	Sutton	
2001	The Vice	Defence Council	
2001	The Way We Live Now	Miles Grendall	
2003	Cambridge Spies	Guy Liddell	
2003	Boudica	Severus	
2004	Wire in the Blood	Willerton	
2005	Casanova	Man at Arms	
2007	Hotel Babylon	Francis Levington	
2008	Waking the Dead	Stephen Carson	
2008	The Shooting of Thomas Hurndall	Sherard Cowper-Coles	
2009	Above Suspicion	Parks	
2010	The Sarah Jane Adventures	Mr Dread	
2012	Being Human	Dr North	
2013	Murder on the Home Front	Carver	
2015	Peep Show	Angus Maynard	
2015	Father Brown	Colonel Laurence St Clare	
2016	Midsomer Murders	Roderick Craven	
2016	Flowers	George	
2018	Hamlet	King Claudius	Television movie
2018	Plebs	Evander	
2019	Year of the Rabbit	Sir Giles Linley	
2019	The Crown	Martin Furnival Jones	
2019	Succession	Phillipe Layton	
2020	COBRA	General Pickering	
2020	His Dark Materials	Dr. Haley	
2020	Endeavour	Professor Blish	
2021	Sex Education	Sex Educator	
2022	The Witchfinder	Mr Harvey	
2022	The Capture	Anthony Reed	
2023	Dreaming Whilst Black	Timothy Eastly	
2024	Mary & George	Sir David Graham	
2024	Inside No.9	Dr Death	
2026	Patience	Jay Presto	

=== Theatre ===
Year	Play	Role	Director	Theatre
1991	Henry IV Parts I & II	Douglas & Bullcalf	Adrian Noble	Royal Shakespeare Company
1992	The Dybbuk	Batlon	Katie Mitchell	Royal Shakespeare Company
1992	The Theban Plays	Chorus	Adrian Noble	Royal Shakespeare Company
1993	Hamlet	Guildenstern	Adrian Noble	Royal Shakespeare Company
1993	Salomé	Iokanaan	Steven Berkoff	European tour
1994	A Mongrel's Heart	Bormenthal	Mark Wing-Davey	Royal Lyceum Theatre
1995	Private Lives	Victor	Kenny Ireland	Royal Lyceum Theatre
1996	Mother Courage	The Lieutenant	Jonathan Kent	National Theatre
1997	A Midsummer Night's Dream	Lysander	Jonathan Miller	Almeida Theatre
1998	Chips With Everything	Pilot Officer	Howard Davies	National Theatre
1999	Talk of the City	Clive	Stephen Poliakoff	Royal Shakespeare Company
2000	The Importance of Being Earnest	Algernon	Selina Cadell	Nottingham Playhouse
2001	Three Sisters	Tusenbach	Loveday Ingram	Chichester Festival Theatre
2002	Twelfth Night	Sir Andrew Aguecheek	Tim Carroll	Globe Theatre at the Middle Temple Hall
2003	Three Sisters	Kulygin	Katie Mitchell	National Theatre
2004	Measure for Measure	Provost	Simon McBurney	National Theatre
2004	Stuff Happens	Journalist/David Manning	Nicholas Hytner	National Theatre
2005	A Dream Play	The Dreamer	Katie Mitchell	National Theatre
2006	Measure for Measure	Angelo	Simon McBurney	Complicité & International tour
2006	The Seagull	Dr Dorn	Katie Mitchell	National Theatre
2007	St Joan	Earl of Warwick	Marianne Elliott	National Theatre
2007	War Horse	Hauptmann Friedrich Müller	Marianne Elliott and Tom Morris	National Theatre
2008	The Merchant of Venice	Shylock	Tim Carroll	Shakespeare Company
2008	The Tragedy of Thomas Hobbes	Rotten	Elizabeth Freestone	Shakespeare Company
2009	Mrs Affleck	Alfred Affleck	Marianne Elliott	National Theatre
2010	Design for Living	Ernest	Anthony Page	The Old Vic
2010	The Cat in the Hat	The Cat	Katie Mitchell	National Theatre & Young Vic & Paris
2011	Wastwater	Jonathan	Katie Mitchell	The Royal Court
2012	The Master and Margarita	Koroviev-Fagot	Simon McBurney	Barbican Theatre & European Tour
2013	Privates on Parade	Major Giles Flack	Michael Grandage	Noël Coward Theatre
2013	Twelfth Night	Sir Andrew Aguecheek	Tim Carroll	Belasco Theatre
2013	Richard III	Duke of Buckingham	Tim Carroll	Belasco Theatre
2014	The Cherry Orchard	Leonid Gaev	Katie Mitchell	The Young Vic
2015	Oresteia	Agamemnon	Robert Icke	Almeida Theatre & Trafalgar Studios
2016	1984	O'Brien	Daniel Raggett	Playhouse Theatre
2017	Hamlet	King Claudius	Robert Icke	Almeida Theatre & Harold Pinter Theatre
2018	The Prime of Miss Jean Brodie	Gordon Lowther	Polly Findlay	Donmar Warehouse
2022	Oresteia & Hamlet	Agamemnon & Claudius	Robert Icke	Park Avenue Armory, New York
2023	Nachtland	Kahl	Patrick Marber	The Young Vic

=== Video games ===
Year	Game	Role	Developer	Producer	Platform
2013	Killzone: Mercenary	Mandor Savic	Guerrilla Cambridge	Sony Computer Entertainment	PlayStation Vita
2023	Final Fantasy XVI	Quentin	Square Enix Creative Business Unit III	Square Enix	PlayStation 5
2024	Eiyuden Chronicle: Hundred Heroes	Markus	Rabbit and Bear Studios	505 Games	Multiple
2025	Detective	Karl von Rove	Studio Chipo y Juan	Meta	VR
