= Jude Powell =

English actor and filmmaker

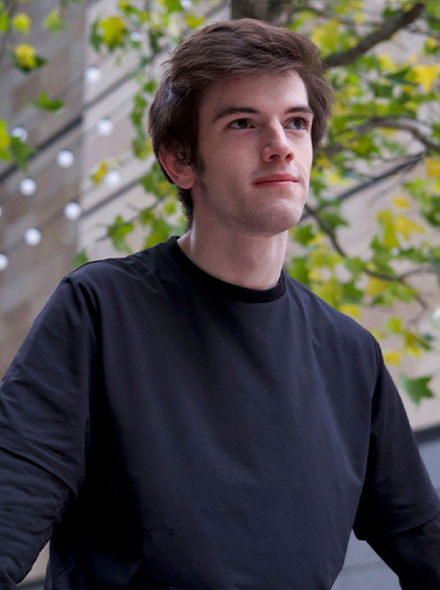
- Powell in 2023
- Born: 4 July 2003 (age 23); London, England
- Occupations: Actor; filmmaker
- Years active: 2024–present

Jude Powell (born 4 July 2003) is an English actor and filmmaker. He is a British Sign Language (BSL) user and is known for his roles as Jake Green in the Acorn TV crime drama The Chelsea Detective (2025) and Lord Allison in the Netflix period drama Bridgerton (2026).

== Early life and education ==
Jude Powell was born in Lewisham, London. At 18 months old, Powell contracted meningitis, resulting in profound hearing loss. He grew up in High Wycombe, Buckinghamshire, and attended Highworth Combined School and Nursery, Heathlands School in St Albans, Hertfordshire, and Berkshire College of Agriculture in Maidenhead, Berkshire, where he achieved distinctions in Creative Media at secondary school and college level.

From 2019 to 2024, Powell trained in acting at Deafinitely Youth Theatre in London, earning Bronze, Silver, and Gold Arts Awards qualifications. He completed the BSL Acting Intensive course at Royal Central School of Speech and Drama in 2024. In 2025, he became an alumnus of Vamos Theatre and was accepted into the National Youth Theatre, becoming the first deaf actor to complete its Digital Membership Course.

== Career ==
Powell began his acting career in 2024, appearing in the short film Ava's Story and a SignHealth charity project, both of which premiered at the Deaffest film festival. Later that year, he signed with Aston Management, a talent agency based in Henley-on-Thames, Oxfordshire. He made his television debut as Jake Green in the third season of The Chelsea Detective on Acorn TV. During production, lead actor Adrian Scarborough described Powell as a "huge talent" in an interview with BBC News. Powell also appeared in the television movie The Chris Baker Show on Lumo TV in 2025.

In January 2026, Powell appeared as Lord Allison in the fourth season of Netflix’s Bridgerton, performing a scene in British Sign Language. In April 2026, Powell featured in a UK television advertising campaign for Macmillan Cancer Support titled Fair Cancer Care.

== Filmography ==
=== Film ===
Year	Title	Role	Notes
2024	Ava’s Story	Adrian	Short film; premiered at Deaffest 2024

=== Television ===
Year	Title	Role	Notes
2025	The Chris Baker Show	The Client	Television movie
2025	The Chelsea Detective	Jake Green	Episode 3: "Myths & Legends"
2026	Bridgerton	Lord Allison	Episode 3: "The Field Next to the Other Road"
