= Hamlet (2018 film) =

- Based on: Hamlet; By William Shakespeare
- Directed by: Rhodri Huw; Robert Icke; Ilinca Radulian
- Starring: Andrew Scott; Juliet Stevenson; Jessica Brown Findlay; Luke Thompson; Angus Wright

Production
- Producers: Danuel Schumann; John Wyver
- Editor: Dylan Goch
- Running time: 191 minutes
- Production companies: The Almeida Theatre; The Ambassador Theatre Group; Sonia Friedman Productions

Original release
- Network: BBC Two
- Release: 31 March 2018

Hamlet is a 2018 stage recording of Robert Icke's production of Hamlet at the London's Harold Pinter Theatre. The film stars Andrew Scott in the title role alongside Juliet Stevenson, Jessica Brown Findlay, Luke Thompson, and Angus Wright.

== Premise ==
Hamlet, Prince of Denmark, returns home to find his father murdered and his mother remarrying the murderer, his uncle. Meanwhile, war is brewing.

== Cast ==
- Andrew Scott as Prince Hamlet
- Juliet Stevenson as Queen Gertrude
- Jessica Brown Findlay as Ophelia
- Luke Thompson as Laertes
- Angus Wright as King Claudius
- Maanuv Thiara as Marcellus
- Peter Wight as Polonius
- David Rintoul as King Hamlet
- Joshua Higgott as Horatio
- Calum Finlay as Rosencrantz
- Madeline Appiah as Guildenstern
- Nikesh Patel as Fortinbras

== Production ==
Robert Icke's modern dress version of Hamlet premiered at the Almeida Theatre in 2017, later transferring to the Harold Pinter Theatre. In August 2017, BBC Two announced that they would broadcast a taped version of the production.

Filming took place at the Harold Pinter Theatre. BBC Two broadcast the production on 31 March 2018.
