= Goodbye Christopher Robin =

2017 film directed by Simon Curtis

- British release poster
- Directed by: Simon Curtis
- Written by: Frank Cottrell-Boyce; Simon Vaughan
- Produced by: Steve Christian; Damian Jones
- Starring: Domhnall Gleeson; Margot Robbie; Kelly Macdonald
- Cinematography: Ben Smithard
- Edited by: Victoria Boydell
- Music by: Carter Burwell
- Production companies: DJ Films; Gasworks Media
- Distributed by: Fox Searchlight Pictures
- Release dates: 20 September 2017 (Odeon Luxe Leicester Square); 29 September 2017 (UK)
- Running time: 107 minutes
- Country: United Kingdom
- Language: English
- Budget: <$3 million
- Box office: $7.2 million

Goodbye Christopher Robin is a 2017 British biographical drama film about Winnie-the-Pooh's creator A. A. Milne and his family, particularly his son Christopher. Directed by Simon Curtis and written by Frank Cottrell-Boyce and Simon Vaughan, it stars Domhnall Gleeson, Margot Robbie, and Kelly Macdonald. The film premiered in the United Kingdom on 29 September 2017, receiving mixed reviews from critics and grossed $7.2 million at the box office.

== Plot ==
During World War II in 1941, Alan Alexander Milne – nicknamed "Blue" by his friends and family – and his wife Daphne receive a distressing telegram at their home. The story then flashes back to 1916 during World War I with Blue fighting in the Battle of the Somme. Blue resumes his life with Daphne in England while suffering shell shock with occasional flashbacks to his battle experiences, and has a child with Daphne. Daphne appears traumatised by the birth as the midwife says "she didn't understand the mechanics" of giving birth. She was also hoping for a girl and is disappointed to instead have a son. They name the baby Christopher Robin Milne, but generally call him "Billy Moon". They hire a nanny, Olive Rand, whom Billy calls "Nou". At Olive's job interview, Daphne says how wonderful it is that whilst the war killed so many men, it means there are a great number of women such as Olive who will never marry and can therefore be of service to others.

Blue is having difficulty resuming his writing – he wants to draft a compelling treatise against war – and relocates the family to a house in the country with wooded acreage. Daphne resents the move and returns to London for an extended period. During that time, Olive goes to care for her dying mother and the cook takes some time off, leaving Blue and Billy to fend for themselves. Reluctantly at first, Blue takes Billy along on walks in the woods and begins making up stories about the boy's adventures with the plush toy animals the parents have bought for him.

Blue invites his illustrator friend Ernest to join them at the house, and together they begin to develop the Winnie-the-Pooh books. Daphne returns to the house after Blue sends her a poem, "Vespers", that she has had published for him in Vanity Fair. Olive returns following her mother's death. After the Winnie-the-Pooh books become a success, Daphne manages their new-found celebrity and readily accepts extra opportunities to generate publicity and income, for example, a line of Winnie the Pooh bears, or an opportunity to have tea with 'Christopher Robin'. As Christopher Robin, Billy makes frequent public appearances, which he finds confusing and frustrating.

When Billy learns that Olive has a beau, Alfred Brockwell, he tells his parents, after which Daphne feels betrayed and confronts Olive nastily. Olive becomes angry with Blue and Daphne, resigns, and admonishes them for what they have been putting Billy through. Blue resolves to stop writing about the boy and his imaginary friends. Olive leaves and Billy's mother tells him not to cry.

Blue ends Billy's publicity activities and enrolls him at a boarding school. However, "Christopher Robin" is bullied at the school and emerges bitter toward his father. When World War II breaks out, Billy is initially declared medically unfit for service, but he demands that his well-connected father – despite being horrified by war and the prospect of his son experiencing what he did – convince the army to accept him regardless. Billy leaves for service, turning his back on his father and disowning the books and the money from them. He gives Blue the cricket ball from the one match they played together where they 'connected'. Blue tries to stop him going at the last moment but it is too late.

The telegram from the opening scene is revisited: Billy has been reported missing and is presumed dead – news Blue passes to Olive, who is distraught. Billy's parents are both devastated by the news; Daphne blames Blue for having made it possible to send Billy off to the war. Relations between them are once again strained. However, Billy has survived and arrives at the country house without warning, leading to awkward but tearful reunions with his parents and Olive. Blue and Billy reconcile as Billy tells his father how one of Billy's fellow soldiers, in the desert under enemy fire, sang one of the 'Hums of Pooh' which made him realise that his father's storybook was a gift to the world which enabled British soldiers to remember the simple happy things about home. Father and son walk together through the woods, Billy being shown as both a young child and young man.

== Cast ==
- Domhnall Gleeson as A. A. Milne/Blue
- Margot Robbie as Daphne Milne, A. A. Milne's wife
- Kelly Macdonald as Olive Rand/Nou, Christopher Robin's nanny
- Alex Lawther as 18-year-old Christopher Robin Milne
  - Dexter and Sonny Hyman as 3-year-old Christopher Robin Milne
  - Will Tilston as 8-year-old Christopher Robin Milne/Billy Moon
- Stephen Campbell Moore as Ernest H. Shepard
- Vicki Pepperdine as Betty
- Richard McCabe as Rupert
- Geraldine Somerville as Lady O
- Phoebe Waller-Bridge as Mary Brown
- Mossie Smith as Sharon the Midwife
- Mark Tandy as Portrait Photographer
- Richard Dixon as MC at Pageant
- Shaun Dingwall as Alfred Brockwell
- Rolan Bell as American Cop
- Grace Curtis as Sister McGovern
- Matilda Curtis as Sister McGovern
- Richard Clifford as Toy Shop Manager
- Simon Williams as Zoo Director
- Robert Portal as Headmaster
- Tommy Rodger as Douglas Minor
- Jim Cartwright as Military Medic
- Nico Mirallegro as Cooper (uncredited)

== Production ==
Development on the project first began in 2010, with Steve Christian and Nuala Quinn-Barton, and subsequently Damian Jones, as producers. Simon Vaughan wrote the screenplay.

In April 2016, Domhnall Gleeson entered discussions to star as A. A. Milne. He and Margot Robbie were confirmed to star in June 2016, with her as Milne's wife Daphne. Kelly Macdonald joined the film as Olive later in the month.

Filming began in September 2016.

== Reception ==
The film was released in the UK on 29 September 2017, and in the US on 13 October 2017.

=== Critical response ===
On review aggregator Rotten Tomatoes, the film has an approval rating of 64% based on 181 reviews, with an average rating of 6.2/10. The site's critical consensus reads, "Goodbye Christopher Robin struggles to balance wartime tension and childlike wonder, but offers valuable insight into the darkness shadowing the creation of a classic children's tale." On Metacritic, the film has a weighted average score of 54 out of 100, based on 28 critics, indicating "mixed or average reviews".

The Economist gave the film a mixed review, writing that "As in so many middlebrow period dramas, the vintage cars are too shiny, the clothes too smart, the upper-class accents too strained and the dialogue too contrived. However dark the plot becomes, the sun keeps shining brightly through the trees. You are never allowed to forget that you are watching a traditional piece of tourist-friendly British heritage cinema." The review praised it, however, stating that, "There aren't many films that demonstrate how a phenomenal professional success can also be the most catastrophic personal failure; there certainly aren't many that revolve around a collection of cuddly toys."

=== Accolades ===
Award	Date of ceremony	Category	Recipients	Result	Ref.
British Independent Film Awards	10 December 2017	Best Supporting Actress	Kelly Macdonald	Nominated	
Heartland Film Festival	20 November 2017	Truly Moving Picture Award	Goodbye Christopher Robin	Won	
Mill Valley Film Festival	16 October 2017	Audience Award — World Cinema	Goodbye Christopher Robin	Won	

== See also ==
- A Bear Named Winnie – a 2004 made-for-television drama film about the real-life bear Winnipeg, with Vaughan also acting as a writer and producer.
- Christopher Robin – a 2018 fictional film made by the Walt Disney Company about the character named after Christopher Robin Milne.
