= Christopher Robin Milne =

English author and bookseller (1920–1996)

- Milne in 1928
- Born: 21 August 1920; Chelsea, London, England
- Died: 20 April 1996 (aged 75); Totnes, Devon, England
- Other name: Billy Moon (childhood nickname)
- Education: Gibbs School; Boxgrove Preparatory School; Stowe School; Trinity College, Cambridge
- Occupations: Novelist; playwright; poet
- Years active: 1920–1975
- Known for: Giving his name to Christopher Robin in Winnie-the-Pooh
- Spouse: Lesley de Sélincourt (m. 1948)
- Children: Clare Milne (1956–2012)
- Parent(s): A. A. Milne; Daphne de Sélincourt
- Relatives: Aubrey de Sélincourt (uncle)

Christopher Robin Milne (21 August 1920 – 20 April 1996) was an English author and bookseller and the only child of author A. A. Milne. As a child, he was the basis of the character Christopher Robin in his father's Winnie-the-Pooh stories and in two books of poems.

== Early life ==
Christopher Robin Milne was born at 11 Mallord Street, Chelsea, London (renumbered as 13 Mallord Street in 1924), on 21 August 1920, to author Alan Alexander Milne and Dorothy "Daphne" (née de Sélincourt) Milne. Milne speculated that he was an only child because "he had been a long time coming". From an early age, Milne was cared for by his nanny Olive Rand (later Brockwell), until May 1930, when he entered boarding school. Milne called her "Nou", and stated "Apart from her fortnight's holiday every September, we had not been out of each other's sight for more than a few hours at a time", and "we lived together in a large nursery on the top floor."

Within the family, he was referred to as "Billy Moon", a combination of his nickname and his childhood mispronunciation of Milne. From 1929 onwards, he would simply be referred to as Christopher, and he later stated that it was "the only name I feel to be really mine".

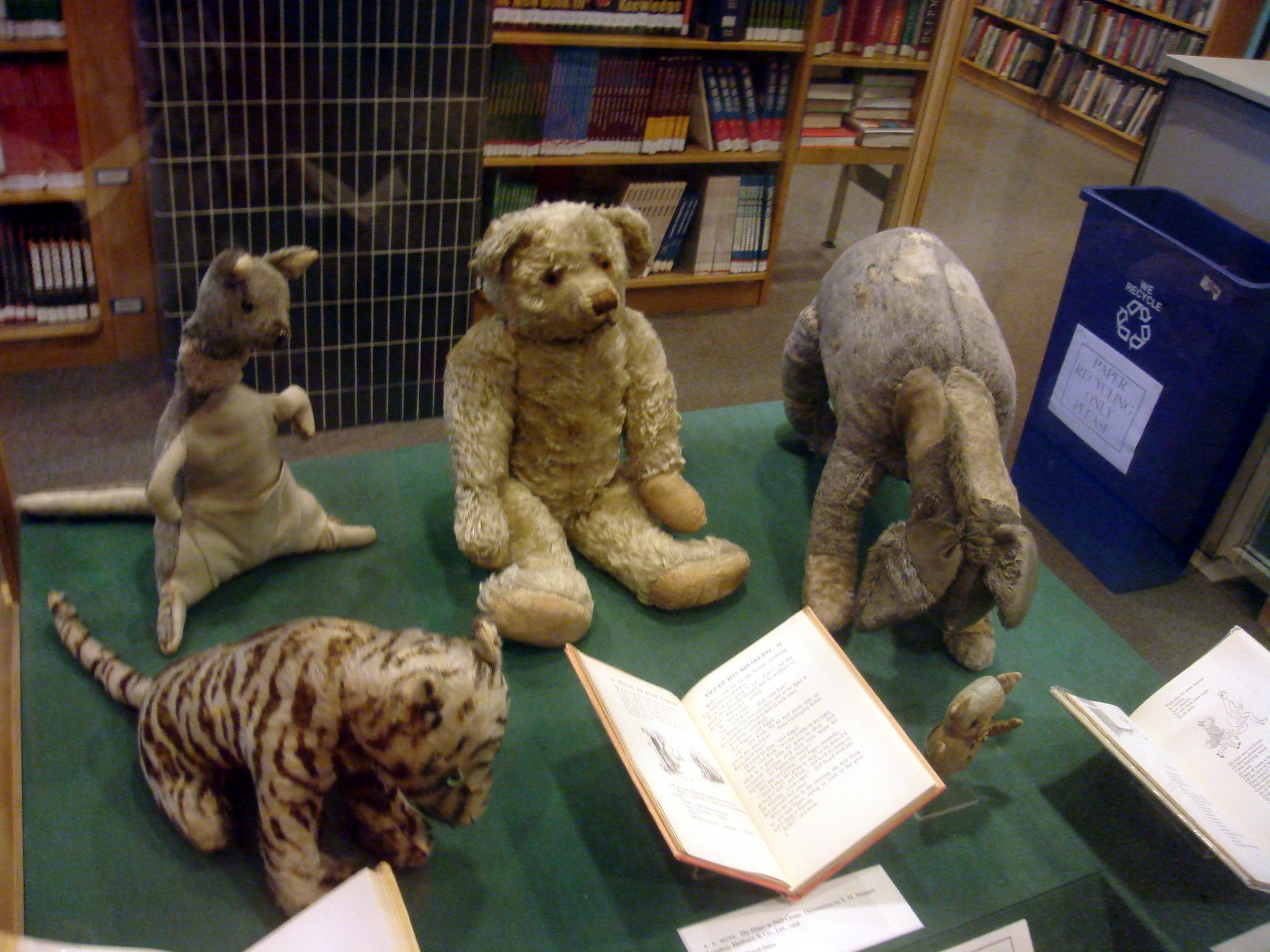
Milne's childhood stuffed animals – the inspiration for characters in the Pooh stories – are now owned by the New York Public Library. (Roo was lost when Christopher Robin was nine years old.)

On his first birthday on 21 August 1921, Milne received an Alpha Farnell teddy bear, which he later named Edward. Eeyore was a Christmas present in 1921 and Piglet arrived undated. Edward, along with a real Canadian black bear named Winnipeg that Milne saw at London Zoo, eventually became the inspiration for the Winnie-the-Pooh character.

Milne spoke self-deprecatingly of his own intellect: "I may have been on the dim side", or "not very bright". He also described himself as being "good with his hands" and possessing a Meccano set. His self-descriptions included "girlish", since he had long hair and wore "girlish clothes", and being "very shy and 'un-self-possessed'".

An early childhood friend was Anne Darlington, also an only child. To Milne's parents Darlington was the daughter that Milne was not; as Milne described it, "to my parents, Anne was and remained to her death the Rosemary that I wasn't". Daphne long held fond hopes that Darlington and Milne would marry. Darlington had a toy monkey, Jumbo, as dear to her as Pooh was to Milne. Several poems by Milne's father, and several illustrations by E. H. Shepard, feature Darlington and Milne—notably "Buttercup Days", in which their relative hair colours (brown and golden blond) and their mutual affection are noted (the illustration to this latter poem, from Now We Are Six, also features the cottage at Cotchford Farm).

In 1925, Milne's father bought Cotchford Farm, near Ashdown Forest in East Sussex. Though still living in London, the family would spend weekends, Easter, and summer holidays there. As Milne described it, "So there we were in 1925 with a cottage, a little bit of garden, a lot of jungle, two fields, a river, and then all the green, hilly countryside beyond, meadows and woods, waiting to be explored." The place became the inspiration for fiction, with Milne stating: "Gill's Lap that inspired Galleon's Lap, the group of pine trees on the other side of the main road that became the Six Pine Trees, the bridge over the river at Posingford that became Pooh-sticks Bridge", and a nearby "ancient walnut tree" became Pooh's House. His toys, Pooh, Eeyore, Piglet, plus two invented characters, Owl and Rabbit, came to life through Milne and his mother, to the point where his father could write stories about them. Kanga, Roo, and Tigger were later presents from his parents.

Of this time, Milne states: "I loved my Nanny, I loved Cotchford. I also quite liked being Christopher Robin and being famous."

Aged six, Milne and Darlington attended Miss Walters' school. At the age of nine, Milne was admitted to boarding school, and his nanny departed to marry Alf Brockwell. When Milne eventually wrote his memoirs, he dedicated them to Olive Rand Brockwell: "Alice to millions, but Nou to me". His father's poem "Buckingham Palace", in the 1924 poetry book When We Were Very Young, includes the line "Alice is marrying one of the guard". This refers to Olive and Alf, who in real-life was a Post Office electrical engineer.

=== Schooling ===
On 15 January 1929, Milne started at Gibbs, a boys' day school in Sloane Square, London. In May 1930, he started boarding school at Boxgrove School near Guildford. Of his time at boarding school, Milne said: "it was now that began that love-hate relationship with my fictional namesake that has continued to this day". His father's books were popular, and they were well known by his schoolmates, which made Milne a target of bullying by the other children. Milne later described the poem "Vespers" – about the toddler Christopher Robin saying his evening prayers – as "the one [work] that has brought me over the years more toe-curling, fist-clenching, lip-biting embarrassment than any other".

Milne earned a mathematics scholarship at Stowe School, where he was relentlessly bullied, and wrote: "It seemed to me almost that my father had got to where he was by climbing upon my infant shoulders, that he had filched from me my good name and had left me with the empty fame of being his son."

Milne's relationship with his father grew during Christopher's adolescence, bonding when the younger Milne was at home on breaks, but this did not last once Christopher left for college at Cambridge. He went up to Trinity College, Cambridge, in 1939.

== Adult life ==
When the Second World War started, Milne left his studies and tried to join the British Army, but failed the medical examination. His father used his influence to allow Milne to join as a sapper in the 2nd Training Battalion of the Royal Engineers. He was commissioned in July 1942, and was posted to South-west Asia and then to Italy, where he was wounded as a platoon commander the following year. After the war he returned to Cambridge University and completed a degree in English.

At 26, he was a very well educated ex-army officer from a privileged family. He spent a period in London trying to readjust to "civvy street" by finding gainful employment, but his social status worked against him. He explored several career avenues, each one ending in a fruitless cul-de-sac. This was an unhappy and directionless period, sometimes referred to as his 'Downwards' turn. Of this idle interlude he commented: "How hateful it is to have too little to do." But he entered an altogether more personally fulfilling chapter of his life: marriage, and as a successful bookshop owner.

On 11 April 1948, Milne became engaged to his first cousin Lesley de Sélincourt and they married on 24 July 1948. His mother Daphne disapproved because she had long been estranged from her brother Aubrey, Lesley's father.

In 1951, he and his wife moved to Dartmouth, and opened The Harbour Bookshop on 25 August. This turned out to be a success, although his mother had thought the decision odd, as Milne did not seem to like "business", and as a bookseller he would have to meet fans of his father's work. The shop was closed by its most recent owners in September 2011.

Milne occasionally visited his father when the elder Milne became ill. After his father died, Milne never returned to Cotchford Farm. His mother eventually sold the farm and moved back to London after disposing of his father's personal possessions. Milne, who did not want any part of his father's royalties, decided to write a book about his childhood. As Milne describes it, that book, The Enchanted Places, "combined to lift me from under the shadow of my father and of Christopher Robin, and to my surprise and pleasure I found myself standing beside them in the sunshine able to look them both in the eye".

Following her husband's death, Daphne Milne had little further contact with her son, only seeing him once during the last 15 years of her life and refusing to see him on her deathbed.

A few months after his father's death in 1956, Milne's daughter Clare was born and diagnosed with severe cerebral palsy.

Milne gave the original stuffed animals that inspired the Pooh characters to the books' editor, who in turn donated them to the New York Public Library. Marjorie Taylor recounts in her book Imaginary Companions and the Children Who Create Them that many were disappointed at this, and Milne had to explain that he preferred to concentrate on the things that currently interested him. He disliked the idea of Winnie-the-Pooh being commercialised.

Milne, who lived with myasthenia gravis for some years, died in his sleep on 20 April 1996 in Totnes, Devon, at a hospital, aged 75. Following his death, he was described by one newspaper as a "dedicated atheist".

== Family ==
Milne married Lesley de Sélincourt, daughter of the translator Aubrey de Sélincourt, whose sister was Dorothy "Daphne" de Sélincourt, Milne's mother, and thus he and Lesley were first cousins. They were married from 1948 until his death in 1996. Lesley died in 2014.

Milne had one child, a daughter named Clare, who had cerebral palsy. In adult life, she led several charitable campaigns for the condition. In 1998, funds from the estate became available to her, and she, with the help of her mother Lesley, set up the Clare Milne Trust, which began awarding grants in 2002. Clare died in 2012, at the age of 56, of a heart abnormality.

== Portrayal ==
Milne is portrayed by Will Tilston and Alex Lawther in Goodbye Christopher Robin, a 2017 film which was "inspired by" his relationship with his father. He was further portrayed by Ewan McGregor in the 2018 film Christopher Robin.

== Bibliography ==
- —— (1974). The Enchanted Places. Eyre Methuen. ISBN 0413-31710-2.
- —— (1979). The Path Through the Trees. New York: E. P. Dutton. ISBN 0-525-17630-6.
- —— (1982). The Hollow on the Hill. Methuen. ISBN 978-0-413-51270-3.
- —— (1985). The Windfall. Methuen. ISBN 0-413-58960-9.
- —— (1988). The Open Garden. Methuen. ISBN 0-413-40800-0.

== Sources ==
- "Christopher Robin revealed". BBC News. 27 November 2001. (describes the discovery in 2001 of images of Christopher Robin Milne captured on a 1929 film of a school pageant held in Ashdown Forest, East Sussex).
- Milne, A.A. (2017). It's Too Late Now. London: Bello. ISBN 978-1509869701.
- Milne, Christopher (1975). The Enchanted Places. E.P. Dutton & Co. ISBN 978-0525292937.
- Milne, Christopher (1979). The Path through the Trees. McClelland and Stewart. ISBN 978-0771060496.
- Rakkav, Johanan. "Who Was Christopher Robin Milne?". Archived from the original on 18 June 2007. (Biography of C.R. Milne, with photographs of him at various ages throughout his life)
- Thwaite, Ann (1990). A.A. Milne: His Life. London: Faber & Faber. ISBN 0571161685.
