= Will Tilston =

English actor (born 2007)

- Born: 12 January 2007 (age 19)
- Occupation: Actor
- Years active: 2017–present

Will Tilston (born 12 January 2007) is an English actor. He is known for his titular role in the biographical film Goodbye Christopher Robin (2017) and as Gregory in the Netflix period drama Bridgerton (2020–present).

== Early life and education ==
Tilston first discovered acting through his state school nativity play. He took Saturday classes at the D&B Academy of Performing Arts in Bromley, where he was encouraged to sign with an agent. As of 2023, Tilston attended Colfe's School. In year 12, he performed in a school production of Pathos, Humour and Emotion.

== Career ==
Tilston was nine years old when he auditioned for and was cast in his first professional role of young Christopher Robin Milne (portrayed by Alex Lawther later in life) in Simon Curtis' biographical film Goodbye Christopher Robin starring Domhnall Gleeson and Margot Robbie, and ten years old by the film's release in 2017. Tilston made his television debut when he began starring as Gregory, the seventh Bridgerton child and youngest son in the family, in the 2020 Netflix period drama Bridgerton, a Shondaland-produced adaptation of the Regency romance novels by Julia Quinn.

== Filmography ==
Year	Title	Role	Notes
2017	Goodbye Christopher Robin	8-year-old Christopher Robin Milne	
2020–present	Bridgerton	Gregory Bridgerton	Main role

== Awards and nominations ==
Year	Award	Category	Work	Result	Ref.
2021	Screen Actors Guild Awards	Outstanding Performance by an Ensemble in a Drama Series	Bridgerton	Nominated	
2025	Screen Actors Guild Awards	Outstanding Performance by an Ensemble in a Drama Series	Bridgerton	Nominated	
