= Ruth Gemmell =

English actress

- Born: Ruth Katrin Gemmell; October 1967 (age 58); Bristol, England
- Education: Webber Douglas Academy of Dramatic Art
- Years active: 1991–present
- Spouse: Ray Stevenson (m. 1997; div. 2005)

Ruth Katrin Gemmell (born October 1967) is an English actress. She first starred in the film Fever Pitch (1997). On television, she subsequently appeared in Tracy Beaker (2004–) franchise as Carly Beaker, the BBC One series EastEnders (2009) and Inside Men (2011), the Channel 4 series Utopia (2013–2014), and the ITV war drama Home Fires (2015–2016). She gained further prominence through her role in the Netflix period drama Bridgerton (2020–).

== Early life and education ==
Ruth Katrin Gemmell was born in Bristol and grew up in County Durham, first in Barnard Castle before moving to Darlington with her mother upon her parents' divorce. She has three older brothers and a sister. She attended Polam Hall School, where she gained her first experience in acting, in school plays. Gemmell later moved to London, where her father lived, to pursue acting. She trained at the Webber Douglas Academy of Dramatic Art.

== Career ==
Gemmell has played roles in both theatre and TV dramas. She played the leading female role in Fever Pitch, based on Nick Hornby's memoir of the same name, starring opposite Colin Firth and had another leading role in the comedy/drama 2 January (2006). She played the recurring character of Detective Constable Kerry Cox in the first series of the BBC police procedural Silent Witness, which premiered in 1996. She returned to the series as different characters in 2006 and 2014.

In 2004, she starred in Tracy Beaker's Movie of Me as the mother of the title character. From January 2009, she became a recurring character in EastEnders as Debra Dean, the absentee mother of Whitney Dean. In August 2009, she starred as Rebecca Sands in two episodes of The Bill.

Gemmell appeared three times in the BBC's police drama Waking the Dead. playing different characters. Her first appearance was in 2002 in the episode "Special Relationships" as DI Jess Worral, a former lover of DSI Boyd. She next appeared on the show in 2008, as Linda Cummings, an exceptionally intelligent serial killer. She reprised the role of Cummings in "Endgame", the finale of the eighth series.

Gemmell starred in Episode 8 of Jimmy McGovern's BBC drama Moving On as Joanne, in November 2010. In November 2011, Gemmell played Lady Shonagon in the adaptation for BBC Radio 4 Woman's Hour of The Pillow Book, by Robert Forrest. She appeared as Jen, the wife of an adulterous civil servant, in Channel 4 drama Utopia, in early 2013.

In 2015, Gemmell appeared in five episodes of the television series Penny Dreadful as Octavia Putney. In 2020, she began playing Lady Violet Bridgerton in the Netflix series Bridgerton.

In 2021, Gemmell reprised her role of Carly Beaker for My Mum Tracy Beaker.

== Personal life ==
Gemmell was married in Westminster, London, in 1997 to 2005 to the actor Ray Stevenson, whom she met in 1995 during the filming of TV drama Band of Gold. She remarried in 2015 to someone who she described as an old friend. She moved from her east London home to his small village in the Midlands.

== Filmography ==
=== Film ===
Year	Title	Role	Notes	Ref.
1991	Who Needs a Heart	Abigail	Film	
1996	A Stiff Drink	Woman	Short film	
1997	Fever Pitch	Sarah Hughes	Film	
2006	January 2nd	Claire	Film	
2006	Love for Sale	Lonely Lady	Short film	
2007	Ela	Ela's Mum	Short film	
2007	The Imaginary Girl	Mother	Short film	
2008	Gone Fishing	Imogen	Short film	
2008	Good	Elisabeth	Film	
2010	F	Sarah Balham	Film	
2012	Storage 24	Sarah	Film	
2012	Offender	Cassie	Film	
2013	Chrysanthemum	Janet	Short film	
2019	Cliffs of Freedom	Varvara Vakrinos	Film	
2025	Cleaner	Superintendent Claire Hume	Film	

=== Television ===
Year	Title	Role	Notes	Ref.
1995	The Bill	Sue Latham	Episode: "Woman of Substance"	
1995	Band of Gold	Gina Dickson	Episode: "Sold"	
1996	Kavanagh QC	Jenny Norris	Episode: "Men of Substance"	
1996	Short Sharp Shocks	Kate	Episode: "Everywhere"	
1996	Silent Witness	Kerry Cox	Recurring role (series 1)	
1997	Peak Practice	Christine Higson	Episode: "Home Truths"	
1997	Perfect Blue	Jo	Television film	
1998	Macbeth	Lady Macduff	Television film	
1999	The Bill	Jane Joyce	Episode: "Sex, Lies and Videotape"	
1999	The Alchemists	Julia Bannerman	Television film	
1999	Four Fathers	Nicola Yallop	3 episodes	
2001	Holby City	Diana Calder	Episode: "Extra Time"	
2002	Dalziel and Pascoe	Rachel Waller	Episode: "For Love Nor Money"	
2002	Waking the Dead	DI Jess Worrall	2 episodes	
2003	The Bill	Carol Evans	3 episodes	
2003	The Inspector Lynley Mysteries	Jeannie Waring	"Playing for the Ashes"	
2003	Murder in Mind	Liz Willis	Episode: "Landlord"	
2003	Spooks	Miranda	1 episode	
2004	Tracy Beaker: The Movie of Me	Carly Beaker	Television film	
2004	Blue Dove	Jenny Page	Miniseries	
2005	Midsomer Murders	Anne Merrick	Episode: "The House in the Woods"	
2006	The Afternoon Play	Rachel	Episode: "Are You Jim's Wife?"	
2006	A Touch of Frost	Christine Harris	Episode: "Endangered Species"	
2006	Silent Witness	DI Beth Ashdown	Episode: "Terminus: Part 2"	
2007	Five Days	Dr Tobolska	3 episodes	
2008	Agatha Christie's Poirot	Miss Sweetiman	Episode: "Mrs. McGinty's Dead"	
2008	Summerhill	Rose	Television film	
2008–2009	Waking the Dead	Linda Cummings	Guest role (season 7, episodes 3-4; season 8, episodes 7–8)	
2009	Trial & Retribution	Kay Satchell	Episode: "Shooter: Part 1"	
2009	Primeval	Katherine Kavanagh	2 episodes	
2009	EastEnders	Debra Dean	11 episodes	
2009	The Bill	Rebecca Sands	2 episodes	
2010	Lewis	Robyn Strong	Episode: "Your Sudden Death Question"	
2010	Casualty	Kate Margolin	Episode: "No Place Like Home"	
2010	Law & Order: UK	Mel Garvey	Episode: "Confession"	
2010	Moving On	Joanne	Episode: "Losing My Religion"	
2011	The Fades	Alice	TV mini-series	
2012	Inside Men	Rebecca	TV mini-series	
2013	Father Brown	Martha Quinton	Episode: "The Wrong Shape"	
2013	Dancing on the Edge	Lady Winnet	1 episode	
2013	Holby City	Amanda Layton	2 episodes	
2013	Coming Up	Lynn	Episode: "Big Girl"	
2013–2014	Utopia	Jen Dugdale	Recurring role (9 episodes)	
2014	Silent Witness	Ellie Brooke	Episode: "Undertone: Parts 1 & 2"	
2014	Inspector George Gently	Irene Seddon	Episode: "Gently Between the Lines"	
2014	Casualty	DC Monica Darling	Episode: "Deadfall"	
2015	Midsomer Murders	Diana Carnarvon	Episode: "A Vintage Murder"	
2015	Penny Dreadful	Octavia Putney	Guest role (series 2)	
2015–2016	Home Fires	Sarah Collingborne	Main role	
2017	Ransom	Laurie	Episode: "Girl on a Train"	
2018	Doctors	DCI Gail Hargreaves	2 episodes	
2019	Doc Martin	Shirley Knott	Series 9 Episode 2 :"The Shock of the New"	
2020–present	Bridgerton	Lady Violet Bridgerton	Main role; 32 episodes	
2021	My Mum Tracy Beaker	Carly Beaker		
2023	Queen Charlotte: A Bridgerton Story	Lady Violet Bridgerton, Dowager Viscountess Bridgerton (née Ledger)	Main role; 5 episodes	

=== Theatre ===
	Title	Role	Director	Venue	Ref
	A Tale of Two Cities	Seamstress	Phillip Prowse	Glasgow Citizens	
	The Country Wife	Alethia	Ian Forrest	Lancaster Playhouse	
	Tis Pity She's a Whore	Annabella	Ian Forrest	Lancaster Playhouse	
	The Importance of Being Earnest	Cecily	Hugh Hogart	Edinburgh Lyceum	
	The Winter's Tale	Perdita	Debbie Paige	Salisbury Playhouse	
	An Ideal Husband	Mabel Chilton	Hugh Hodgart	Edinburgh Lyceum	
	Uncle Vanya	Yelena	Hugh Hodgart	Edinburgh Lyceum	
	Measure for Measure	Isabella	Ian Forrest	Chester Gateway	
1991	The Second Mrs. Tanqueray	Ellen	Debbie Page	Salisbury Playhouse	
1994	Othello	Desdemona	Oliver Godfrey	The Railway Tavern	
1997	Turn of the Screw	Governess	Julian Woolford	Hornchurch Queen's Theatre	
1998	Nabokov's Gloves	Mary Duggan	Ian Brown	Hampstead Theatre	
1999	The Weir	Valerie	Ian Rickson	Royal Court Theatre	
2000-2001	Ancient Lights	Iona	Ian Brown	Hampstead Theatre	
2002	Kick for Touch	Eileen	Josie Rourke	Crucible Theatre	
2002	Trips' Cinch	Lucy Parks	Thea Sharrock	Southwark Playhouse	
2004	Midwinter RSC	Maude	Zinny Harris		
2004-2005	Macbeth RSC	Lady Macduff / Witch	Dominic Cooke	Royal Shakespeare Theatre	
2004-2005	King Lear RSC	Regan	Bill Alexander	Royal Shakespeare Theatre	
2005	Coram Boy	Mrs Lynch	Melly Still	National Theatre	
2008	Helter Skelter / Land of the Dead	Woman	Patricia Benecke	Bush Theatre	
2008	Riflemind	Cindy	Philip Seymour Hoffman	Trafalgar Studios	
2010	Les Liaisons Dangereuses	Merteuil	Toby Frow	Salisbury Playhouse	
2011	Zephaniah: In the Night, A Promise	—N/a	Charlotte Westenra	Bush Theatre	
2011	Death and the Maiden	Paulina	Patricia Benecke	Salisbury Playhouse	
2012	Betrayal	Emma	Nick Bagnall	Sheffield Theatres	
2014	The Ant and the Cicada RSC	Selina	Erica Whyman	The Other Place	
2014	Revolt. She Said. Revolt Again. RSC	—N/a	Erica Whyman	The Other Place	
2014	I Can Hear You RSC	Ruth	Jo McInnes	The Other Place	
2014	This is Not an Exit RSC	Nora	Jo McInnes	The Other Place	
2017	No Places for a Woman	Annie	Kate Budgen	Theatre503	
2018	The Whale	Liz	Laurence Boswell	Theatre Royal Bath	
2018	Still Alice	Self	David Grindley	West Yorkshire Playhouse	

=== Radio dramas ===
Year	Title	Role	Station	Notes	Ref.
	The Woman of Juda	Vivien Davies			
	Maestro	Various characters			
	The Cloths of Heaven	Rachel			
1994	Teen Lurve	Nickie	BBC Radio 5		
1994	The Casebook of Sherlock Holmes	Violet de Merville	BBC Radio 4	Episode: "The Illustrious Client"	
1996	The Candlemass Road	Lady	BBC Radio 4	Saturday Night Theatre	
1996	The House	Polly Bannister	BBC Radio 4	Series 6	
1999	Fireworks	Maid	BBC Radio 4		
2001	Ancient Lights	Iona	BBC Radio 3		
2003	Parade's End	Sylvia	BBC Radio 3		
2003	After Scarborough	Sandy	BBC Radio 4		
2003	The Spaceman	Mother	BBC Radio 4		
2008 - 2018	The Pillow Book	Sei Shōnagon	BBC Radio 4	Woman's Hour Drama; Series 1–11	
2009	Classic Serial: The Spy Who Came in from the Cold	Liz	BBC Radio 4	Episodes: 1, 3	
2010	The Vanishing	Lieneke	BBC Radio 4	Saturday Play	
2010	Classic Serial: The Secret Pilgrim	Stephanie	BBC Radio 4	Episode: 1	
2011	The Spy Who Came in from the Cold	Liz Gold	BBC Radio 4		
2013	The Corrupted	Gracie Braden	BBC Radio 4		
2013	The Man in the Lift	Angie	BBC Radio 4		
2013-2014	The Cazalets	Villy	BBC Radio 4	Series: "Casting Off," "All Change"	
2014	Old Times	Kate	BBC Radio 3		
2014	Alison Moore: The Pre-War House and Other Stories	Narrator	BBC Radio 4 Extra	5 episodes	
2014	Time	Narrator	BBC Radio 4	Episode: "A Bagful of Stories"	
2014	The Mysterious Death of Jane Austen	Anne	BBC Radio 4	15 Minute Drama: 5 episodes	
2014	The Time Being: Spells for Love	Melissa	BBC Radio 4		
2015	The Left Hand of Darkness	Ashe	BBC Radio 4	2 episodes	
2015	Clown Shoes	Narrator	BBC Radio 4 Extra	5 episodes	
2017	The Essex Serpent	Narrator	BBC Radio 4	10 episodes	
2017	A Perfect Spy	Mary	BBC Radio 4		

=== Audio dramas ===
Year	Title	Role	Notes	Ref.
2020	The Archers	Victoria	Episode: "1.19335"	

== Awards and nominations ==
Award	Year	Category	Nominated work	Result	Ref.
Screen Actors Guild Awards	2021	Outstanding Performance by an Ensemble in a Drama Series	Bridgerton	Nominated	
Screen Actors Guild Awards	2025	Outstanding Performance by an Ensemble in a Drama Series	Bridgerton	Pending	
