= Luke Thompson (actor) =

English actor (born 1988)

- Born: 4 July 1988 (age 38); Southampton, England
- Education: University of Bristol; Royal Academy of Dramatic Art
- Occupation: Actor
- Years active: 2013–present

Luke Thompson (born 4 July 1988) is an English actor. He is best known for his role as Benedict in the Netflix period drama Bridgerton (2020–present), and has also appeared in the BBC One drama In the Club (2014–2016). In 2024, he received a Laurence Olivier Award nomination for his performance in the stage adaptation of A Little Life.

== Early life and education ==
Luke Thompson was born on 4 July 1988 in Southampton, England, and was brought up in France from the age of two. His father worked as an engineer and his mother as a teacher. He is one of three children. Thompson is of Parsi Indian descent through one of his grandmothers.

From 1997 to 2005, Thompson attended the Lycée International François-Ier in Fontainebleau, a French school with an Anglophone section, where he became a proficient French speaker. He is also proficient in Italian. After returning to England in 2006, Thompson spent a year with the Year Out Drama Company in Stratford-upon-Avon. He went on to study English and Drama at the University of Bristol, and later trained at the Royal Academy of Dramatic Art in London, graduating in 2013.

== Career ==
=== 2013–2020 ===
Thompson's first professional theatre role was as Lysander in A Midsummer Night's Dream at the Globe Theatre, for which he received nominations for both an Evening Standard Theatre Award and an Ian Charleson Award. He went on to appear in the Globe productions of Blue Stockings as Will Bennett, Julius Caesar as Mark Antony, and The Broken Heart as Ithocles. His other stage credits include James in Tiger Country at the Hampstead Theatre, Orestes in the Oresteia at the Almeida Theatre and Laertes in the 2017 production of Hamlet. In 2018, Thompson took over the role of Edgar from Jonathan Bailey in the Ian McKellen-led King Lear after Bailey declined to join the West End transfer in order to appear in the musical Company.

From 2014 to 2016, Thompson played Simon in the BBC One drama In the Club. He narrated a new adaptation of Frederick Forsyth’s novella The Shepherd for BBC Radio 3, broadcast on Christmas Eve 2016. Thompson made his feature film debut with a small role as a warrant officer in Christopher Nolan's 2017 World War II film Dunkirk. He later portrayed Peter Hain in Misbehaviour, a 2020 film centred on the 1970 Miss World competition.

=== 2020–present ===
In 2019, Thompson was cast as Benedict, the second-eldest Bridgerton sibling, in the Shondaland-produced Netflix period drama Bridgerton, which premiered in December 2020 and is based on the novels by Julia Quinn. A supporting character in the first three series, he took the lead in the fourth series, which was released in early 2026.

Thompson played Willem in the English-language stage adaptation of A Little Life, which opened at the Richmond Theatre in March 2023 before transferring to the Harold Pinter Theatre and subsequently the Savoy Theatre. His performance earned him a WhatsOnStage Award and a nomination for a Laurence Olivier Award. He also appeared as Hiram Bingham IV in the Netflix World War II miniseries Transatlantic.

In 2024, Thompson starred as Berowne in the Royal Shakespeare Company's production of Love's Labour's Lost, directed by Emily Burns, which ran from 11 April to 18 May. In 2025, Thompson took part in the Young Vic production of Tim Crouch's cold-read play An Oak Tree, which ran from 6 to 17 May. In 2026, Thompson played Georg Dreyman in Robert Icke's adaptation of The Lives of Others.

== Personal life ==
Thompson does not use social media and keeps the details of his personal life private. In 2023, he stated that "the more you give chunks of yourself out, the more you sort of colour how you're perceived. It's a personal thing... that's from my particular experience of what it's like to be an actor."

== Acting credits ==
=== Film ===
Year	Title	Role	Notes
2014	Shakespeare's Globe: A Midsummer Night's Dream	Lysander	Live recording
2015	Globe on Screen: Julius Caesar	Mark Antony	Live recording
2016	The Complete Walk: Romeo and Juliet	Romeo	Short film
2017	Dunkirk	Warrant Officer	
2018	King Lear	Edgar	National Theatre Live
2019	Making Noise Quietly	Oliver	
2020	Misbehaviour	Peter Hain	
2023	A Little Life	Willem	Live recording
2026	Elsinore	Georgie	

=== Television ===
Year	Title	Role	Notes	Ref.
2014	The Suspicions of Mr Whicher	Joshua Hallows	Episode: "The Ties That Bind"	
2014–2016	In the Club	Simon Lambert	Main role	
2018	Hamlet	Laertes	Television film; filmed stage production	
2018	Kiss Me First	Connor	2 episodes	
2020–present	Bridgerton	Benedict Bridgerton	Main role	
2023	Transatlantic	Hiram "Harry" Bingham	6 episodes	

=== Theatre ===
Year	Title	Role	Director	Venue	Ref.
2013	A Midsummer Night's Dream	Lysander	Dominic Dromgoole	Shakespeare's Globe	
2013	Blue Stockings	Will Bennett	John Dove	Shakespeare's Globe	
2014	Julius Caesar	Mark Antony	Dominic Dromgoole	Shakespeare's Globe	
2014	Tiger Country	James	Nina Raine	Hampstead Theatre	
2015	The Broken Heart	Ithocles	Caroline Steinbeis	Sam Wanamaker Playhouse	
2015	Oresteia	Orestes	Robert Icke	Almeida Theatre	
2017	Hamlet	Laertes	Robert Icke	Almeida Theatre	
2017	Hamlet	Laertes	Robert Icke	Harold Pinter Theatre	
2019	King Lear	Edgar	Jonathan Munby	Duke of York's Theatre	
2023	A Little Life	Willem	Ivo van Hove	Harold Pinter Theatre	
2023	A Little Life	Willem	Ivo van Hove	Richmond Theatre	
2023	A Little Life	Willem	Ivo van Hove	Savoy Theatre	
2024	Love's Labour's Lost	Berowne	Emily Burns	Royal Shakespeare Theatre	
2026	The Lives of Others	Georg Dreyman	Robert Icke	Adelphi Theatre	

=== Audio ===
Year	Title	Role	Notes	Ref.
2016	The Shepherd	Narrator	BBC Radio 3	
2016	Everyone Brave Is Forgiven	Narrator	Simon & Schuster Audio UK	
2018	The Second Pan Book of Horror Stories: The Vertical Ladder	Riz	BBC Radio 4	
2018	The Second Pan Book of Horror Stories: The Judge's House	Malcolmson	BBC Radio 4	
2021	The Brothers Karamazov	Narrator	Penguin Classics	
2021	While Paris Slept	Jean Luc	Audible	
2023	Seventeen: A Coming of Age Story	Narrator	Simon & Schuster Audio UK	
2024	Hard by a Great Forest	Narrator	Audible	
2025	Pride and Prejudice	Mr. Darcy	BBC Radio 4	
2026	The Picture of Dorian Gray	Narrator	BBC Radio 4	

== Awards and nominations ==
Year	Award	Category	Work	Result	Ref.
2013	Evening Standard Theatre Awards	Outstanding Newcomer	A Midsummer Night's Dream	Nominated	
2014	Ian Charleson Awards		A Midsummer Night's Dream	Nominated	
2021	Screen Actors Guild Awards	Outstanding Performance by an Ensemble in a Drama Series	Bridgerton	Nominated	
2024	WhatsOnStage Awards	Best Supporting Performer in a Play	A Little Life	Won	
2024	Laurence Olivier Awards	Best Actor in a Supporting Role	A Little Life	Nominated	
2024	Screen Actors Guild Awards	Outstanding Performance by an Ensemble in a Drama Series	Bridgerton	Nominated	
2026	Gold Derby TV Awards	Drama Actor	Bridgerton	Nominated	
2026	National Film Awards UK	Best Actor in a TV Series	Bridgerton	Nominated	
2026	National Television Awards	Best Performer	Bridgerton	Nominated	
2026	SEC Awards	Best Actor in an International Series	Bridgerton	Nominated	
