= Florence Hunt =

English actress (born 2007)

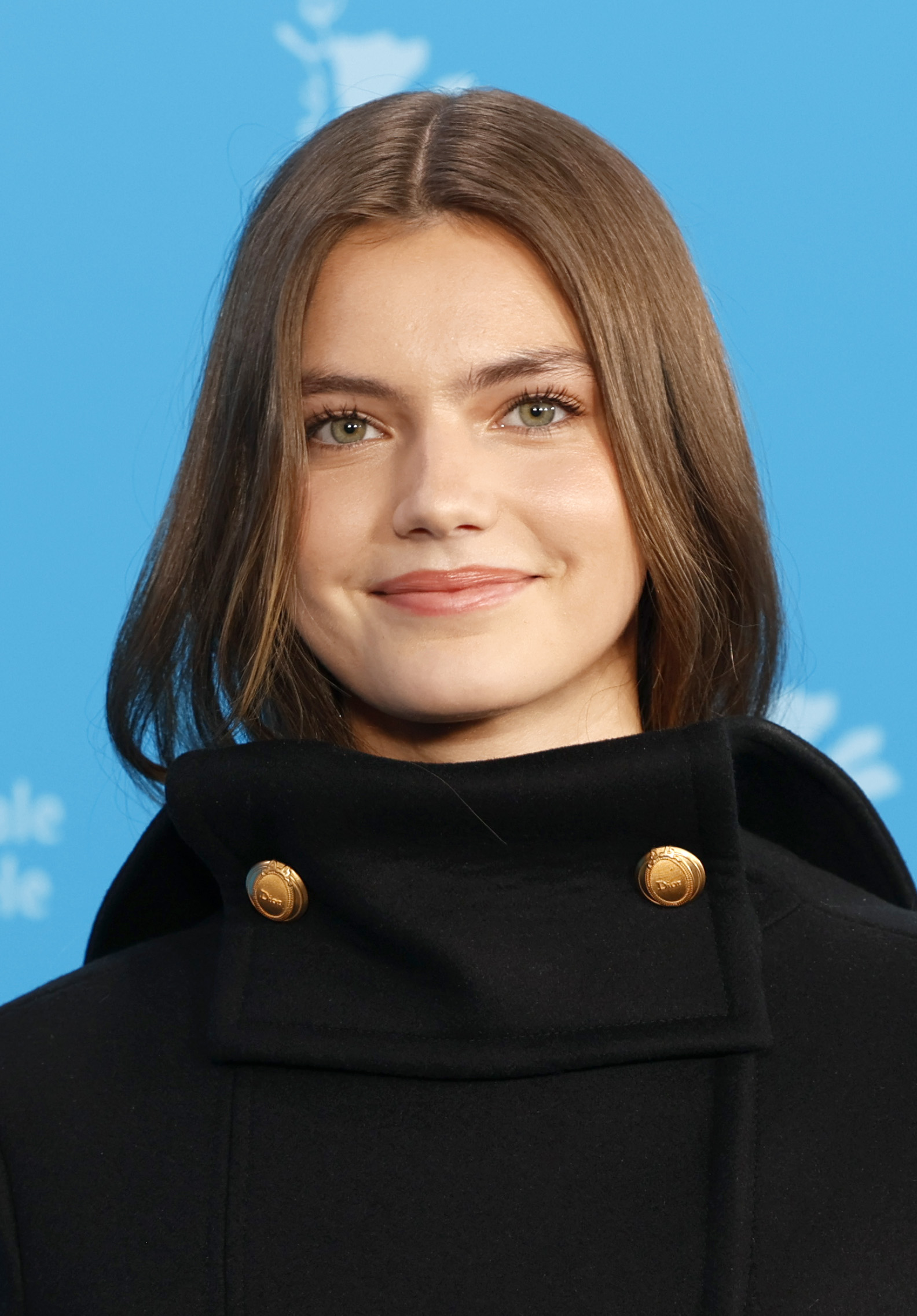
- Hunt in 2026
- Born: 2 February 2007 (age 19)
- Occupation: Actress
- Years active: 2020–present

Florence Hunt (born 2 February 2007) is an English actress. On television, she is known for her role as Hyacinth in the Netflix period drama Bridgerton (2020–present). She also appeared in the Binge miniseries Mix Tape (2025). She starred in the film Queen at Sea (2026).

== Early life and education ==
Florence Hunt was born in 2007. She took acting classes at the Television Workshop in Nottingham.

== Career ==
Hunt made her television debut playing a young version of Katherine Langford's character Nimue in the Netflix Arthurian fantasy series Cursed, which was released in 2020. Later in 2020, Hunt began starring as Hyacinth, the eighth and youngest Bridgerton child, in the period drama Bridgerton, a Shondaland-produced Netflix adaptation of the Regency romance novels by Julia Quinn. While promoting the second season in 2022, Hunt posted several behind-the-scenes TikToks that went viral.

In the 2021 stage adaptation of Force Majeure at Donmar Warehouse, Hunt shared the role of Vera with Bo Bragason. Although the play's critical reviews were mixed, Hunt received praise for her performance. Tim Walker of The New European wrote "The real acting honours go, however, to Florence Hunt and Henry Hunt (on the night I saw it)", while London Theatre Reviews called Hunt "an exceptional young actress".

Hunt portrayed a young version of Teresa Palmer's character Alison in the 2025 Binge miniseries Mix Tape. In 2026, Hunt made her feature film debut starring alongside Juliette Binoche, Tom Courtenay, and Anna Calder-Marshall in Lance Hammer's Queen at Sea.

She is set to further her film career with Bare, a coming-of-age drama directed by Lorna Tucker, in which she will make her lead debut as Sophie, a young runaway searching for belonging and reclaiming her sense of self. The film also stars Isla Fisher and Colin Firth.

== Recognition ==
Hunt was named a 2024 Screen International Star of Tomorrow.

== Filmography ==
=== Film ===
Year	Title	Role	Notes
2026	Queen at Sea	Sara	
TBA	Bare	Sophie	Filming

=== Television ===
Year	Title	Role	Notes
2020	Cursed	Nimue (Aged 10)	2 episodes
2020–present	Bridgerton	Hyacinth Bridgerton	Main role– 32 episodes
2025	Mix Tape	Young Alison	Miniseries

== Awards and nominations ==
Year	Award	Category	Work	Result	Ref.
2021	Screen Actors Guild Awards	Outstanding Performance by an Ensemble in a Drama Series	Bridgerton	Nominated	
2025	Screen Actors Guild Awards	Outstanding Performance by an Ensemble in a Drama Series	Bridgerton	Nominated	
