= High Wire (2025 film) =

- Directed by: Calif Chong
- Written by: Calif Chong; Jackie Lam
- Produced by: Djonny Chen; Sawan Singh; Sanjeev Bhanot
- Cinematography: Matthew P Scott
- Edited by: Nathan Summerfield
- Production companies: Silent D Pictures; MoneySpinner Productions; Mars Media; Make a Difference Films
- Release date: 15 October 2025 (London)
- Country: United Kingdom
- Language: English

High Wire is a 2025 British comedy-drama film directed by Calif Chong in her feature directorial debut. Starring Isabella Wei, the film premiered at the 2025 BFI London Film Festival.

== Cast ==
- Isabella Wei as Go-wing
- Dominic Lam as San-ding
- Elizabeth Tan as Ling
- Jose Palma as Hendrik Garcia
- Nino Fernandez as Sean Winter
- Alina Kovalenko as Bori Mikelsone

== Production ==
The film is produced by Djonny Chen for Silent D Pictures, Sawan Singh for MoneySpinner Productions and Sanjeev Bhanot for Mars Media and co-produced by Tippy Watson for Make a Difference Films.

In 2023, it was announced Isabella Wei would star in the film alongside Dominic Lam. Also in the cast were Elizabeth Tan, Jose Palma and Nino Fernandez as well as real life professional circus performers.

Principal photography took place in early 2023 in North Yorkshire. Filming locations included Askrigg, Catterick, and Wensley.
