= Isabella Wei =

Hong Kong actress (born 2004)

- Born: 1 May 2004 (age 22); Hong Kong
- Education: Chinese International School
- Occupation: Actress
- Years active: 2022–present

Chinese name
- Chinese: 魏蒨妤
Transcriptions
Standard Mandarin
- Hanyu Pinyin: Wèi Tāngyú

Isabella Wei (Chinese: 魏蒨妤 born 1 May, 2004) is a Hong Kong actress and dancer. On television, she is known for her roles in the Netflix series 1899 (2022), Black Doves (2024), and Bridgerton (2026) for its fourth season. She starred in the film High Wire (2025).

== Early life ==
From Hong Kong, Wei attended Chinese International School, graduating in 2022. She was a part of the Hong Kong Youth Arts Foundation where she initially trained as a dancer and performed at the Shouson Theatre, performing hip-hop, contemporary and jazz choreography.

== Career ==
Wei had her first acting role on stage in the Hong Kong Youth Arts Foundation production of #Hashtag. She made her television debut in the 2022 Netflix mystery thriller series 1899, as geisha-dressed character Ling Yi.

In 2023, she was cast in the lead role in the comedy-drama film High Wire alongside Dominic Lam. She appeared as Zadie in the 2024 remake of The Crow alongside Bill Skarsgård and FKA Twigs.

In 2025, she appeared in the espionage thriller Black Doves. In 2026, she appeared as Posy Li in the fourth series of Netflix series Bridgerton.

== Personal life ==
Wei is based in London.

== Filmography ==
Key
†	Denotes film or TV productions that have not yet been released

=== Film ===
Year	Title	Role	Ref.
2024	The Crow	Zadie	
2024	Emmanuelle	Junior concierge	
2025	High Wire	Au Go-wing	
2026	Whatcha Want	Yin	

=== Television ===
Year	Title	Role	Notes	Ref.
2022	1899	Ling Yi	Main cast	
2024	Black Doves	Kai-Ming	Recurring role	
2026	Bridgerton	Posy Li	Recurring role (season 4)	

=== Music video appearances ===
Year	Title	Artist	Ref.
2024	"Dark Moon" (黑月)	Keung To	

=== Theatre ===
Year	Title	Role	Notes
2026	The Hungry Ghost	Ghost	Bush Theatre
