= Highwire (protein) =

Highwire (Hiw) is an E3 ubiquitin ligase protein associated with neuromuscular junction growth. It is frequently studied in Drosophila melanogaster. Its known orthologs are PAM, RPM-1, and PHR-1.
