= James Phoon =

English actor

- Born: 1994 (age 31–32); Brighton, England
- Education: Guildford School of Acting
- Years active: 2015–present

James Wai L. Phoon (born 1994) is an English actor. He began his career in theatre. On television, he is known for his roles in the BBC Three series Wreck (2022–) and the third season of the Netflix period drama Bridgerton (2024).

== Early life ==
Phoon was born in Brighton, Sussex. He is of Chinese and English descent. He trained at the Guildford School of Acting, graduating in 2015 with a Bachelor of Arts in Acting awarded by the University of Surrey.

== Career ==
Phoon made his professional stage debut as an understudy in Lord of the Flies at Regent's Park Open Air Theatre and on tour in 2015. In May 2017, Phoon took over the role of Craig Bowker Junior from Jeremy Ang Jones in Harry Potter and the Cursed Child at the Palace Theatre. Phoon also served as an understudy for Scorpius Malfoy and became the first actor of the global majority to play a Malfoy in the Wizarding World. After leaving Harry Potter and the Cursed Child in 2019, he starred as the titular Peter Pan in Gary Owen's stage adaptation at Storyhouse in Chester.

After doing voice work for video games and animated series, Phoon made his live-action television debut with a recurring role in the 2022 BBC Three horror comedy Wreck. That same year, it was announced Phoon had joined the cast of the Netflix period drama Bridgerton for its third season as Harry Dankworth, Prudence Featherington's (Bessie Carter) new husband. The season premiered in 2024. Also in 2024, Phoon starred as Branwell Brontë in the National Theatre production of Underdog: The Other Other Brontë.

== Personal life ==
Phoon is gay. He spoke of having a boyfriend in 2020.

== Filmography ==
Year	Title	Role	Notes
2020	Sugarbabies	Diamond	Short film
2021	Dodo	Josh	Voice role, 20 episodes
2021	Ninja Express		Voice role, English version
2022	Wreck	Hamish Campbell	6 episodes
2022	JoJo & Gran Gran	Adam	Voice role, episode: "It's Time to Visit the Aquarium"
2024	Wreck	Hamish Campbell	1 episode
2024	Bridgerton	Harry Dankworth	Season 3

=== Video games ===
Year	Title	Role	Notes
2019	Total War: Three Kingdoms	Sima Jiong	
2019	Arknights	2F	English version
2022	Total War: Warhammer III		
2022	Live A Live	Namkiat	English version
2022	Desta: The Memories Between	Sun	
2022	Evil West	Vergil Olney	

=== Music videos ===
- "Wake Me Up" (2021), Foals

== Stage ==
Year	Title	Role	Notes
2015	Lord of the Flies	Understudy	Regent's Park Open Air Theatre, London / UK and Ireland tour
2017	Southern Baptist Sissies	Benny / Iona	Above the Stag Theatre, London
2017–2019	Harry Potter and the Cursed Child	Craig Bowker Junior / Scorpius Malfoy understudy	Palace Theatre, London
2019	Peter Pan	Peter Pan	Storyhouse, Chester
2021	The Convert	Alix	Above the Stag Theatre, London
2024	Underdog: The Other Other Brontë	Branwell Brontë	National Theatre, London
2024	The Tempest	Ferdinand	Theatre Royal Drury Lane
2025	Much Ado About Nothing	Claudio	Theatre Royal Drury Lane
