= Martins Imhangbe =

British-Nigerian actor

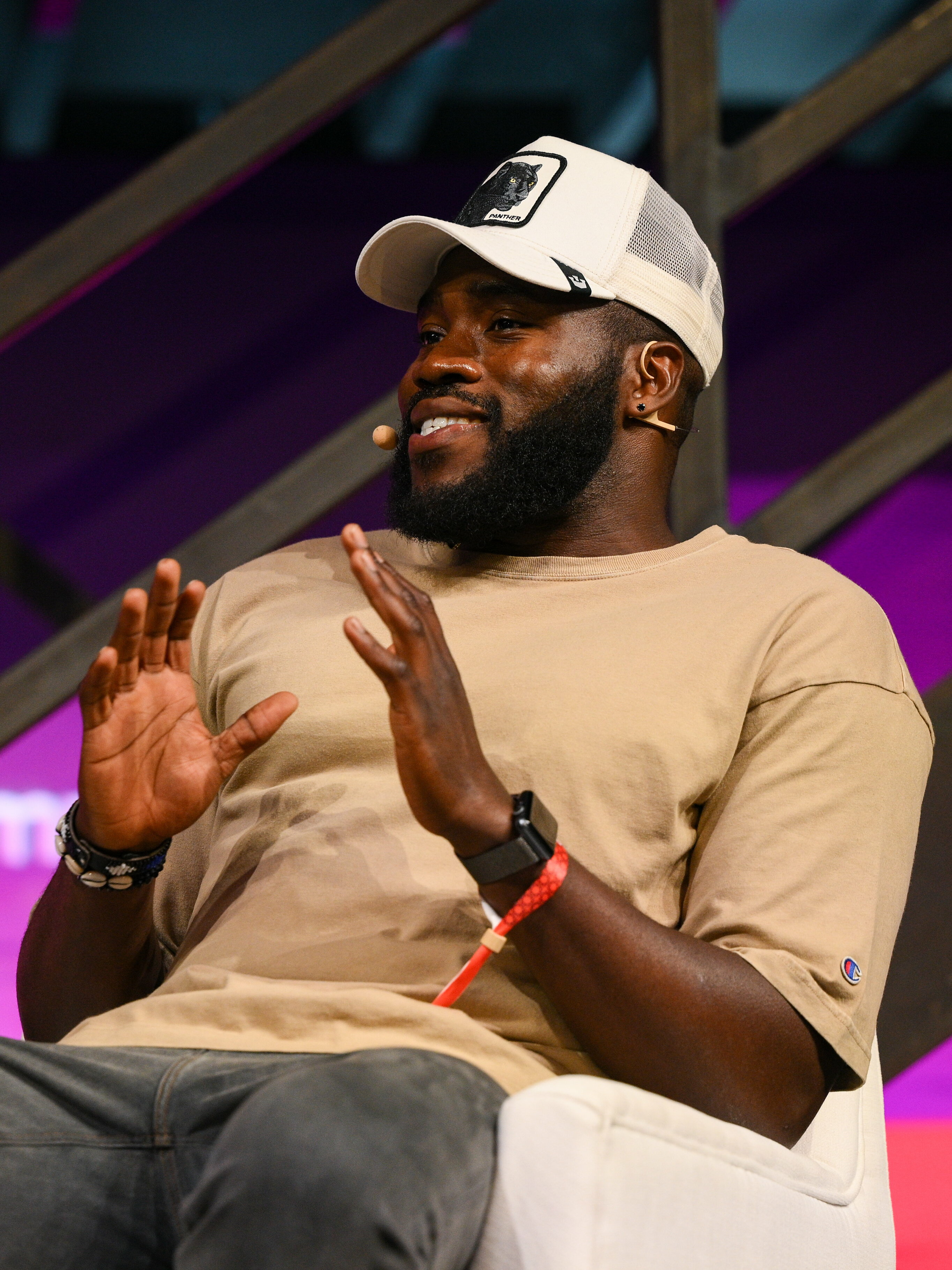
- Imhangbe in 2022
- Born: 7 July 1991 (age 35)
- Education: Royal Central School of Speech and Drama
- Occupation: Actor
- Years active: 2013–present

Martins Isoken Imhangbe (born 7 July 1991) is a British-Nigerian actor. He made his debut in theatre, earning an Ian Charleson Award nomination for his performance in the 2018 production of Richard II. As of 2020, he plays Will Mondrich in the Netflix series Bridgerton.

== Early life ==
Imhangbe is from Edo State, Nigeria. He lived in Greece from the ages of 2 to 7 and spoke fluent Greek. His family then moved to South East London. He pursued a BTEC diploma in Performing Arts at Lewisham College. He auditioned for drama school but did not initially get in, instead studying Technical Theatre at Southwark College. He later re-auditioned, getting into the Royal Central School of Speech and Drama and graduating in 2013.

== Career ==
Post graduation from drama school, Imhangbe had roles in A Human Being Died That Night, Cinderella, and Romeo and Juliet. He starred in the Complicité production of Lionboy, an adaptation of the trilogy by Zizou Corder. The show started at the Tricycle Theatre in London and went to the New Victory Theater Off-Broadway as well as to South Africa, Hong Kong, and South Korea. Imhangbe became an associate artist of Complicité. He had roles in The Skriker at the Manchester Royal Exchange as well as the London productions Octagon in 2015 and Luce and The Royale in 2016.

In 2018, Imhangbe played Bart and the Duke of Aumerle in Richard II at the Almeida Theatre in London. For his performance, he was nominated for an Ian Charleson Award. The production was also filmed as a part of National Theatre Live. That same year, he toured Barber Shop Chronicles with Fuel Theatre in Australia and New Zealand. He also appeared in Absolute Hell at the National Theatre. In 2019, Imhangbe starred as Happy Loman in Death of a Salesman at the Young Vic alongside Wendell Pierce and the titular character on the Shanghai leg of the Othello tour.

Imhangbe landed his first major onscreen role as Will Mondrich in the 2020 Netflix series Bridgerton. The character is based on the real-life boxer, Bill Richmond. Imhangbe trained for the role with Cuong Hua at The Commando Temple in Deptford.

== Acting credits ==
=== Film ===
Year	Title	Role	Notes
2012	Shit Happens	Guy on Left	Short film
2013	The Last British Execution	Bailiff	
2019	The Tragedy of King Richard the Second	Bagot / Duke of Aumerle	National Theatre Live
2020	Samuel's Trousers	Samuel Morgan Smith	Short film

=== Television ===
Year	Title	Role	Notes
2020–present	Bridgerton	Will Mondrich	Recurring role (season 1); Main role (season 2–present)
2021	Forsight	Kofi	Episode: "Digging"

=== Theatre ===
Year	Title	Role	Director	Venue	Notes	Ref.
	What Does it Take		Angela Michaels	The Albany		
	Uncle Vanya		Yael Shavit		RCSSD	
	Sold		Catherine Alexander		Quinconque	
	The Plain Dealer		Wilson Milam		RSC	
	Romeo and Juliet		Imogen Bond	Orange Tree Theatre		
2013	As You Like It		Douglas Rintoul	Transport Theatre	RCSSD	
2013	A Human Being Died That Night	Prisonguard	Jonathan Munby	Hampstead Theatre		
2013	Cinderella	Stepbrother	Sally Cookson	Unicorn Theatre		
2014	Das Ding	Siwa	Tanja Pagnuco	New Diorama Theatre		
2014–2015	Lionboy	Charlie Ashanti	Clive Nedus & James Yeatman	—N/a	International tour	
2015	The Skriker	Radiant Boy	Sarah Frankcom	Royal Exchange, Manchester		
2015	Octagon	Atticus	Nadia Latif	Arcola Theatre		
2016	Luce	Luce	Simon Dormandy	Southwark Playhouse		
2016	The Royale	Fish	Madani Younis	Bush Theatre		
2018	Barber Shop Chronicles	Winston / Shoni	Bijan Sheibani	—N/a	Australia & New Zealand tour	
2018	Absolute Hell	GI Sam Mitchum	Joe Hill-Gibbins	Royal National Theatre		
2018	An Adventure	David	Madani Younis	Bush Theatre		
2018	Richard II	Bagot / Duke of Aumerle	Joe Hill-Gibbins	Almeida Theatre		
2019	Death of a Salesman	Happy Loman	Miranne Elliot & Miranda Cromwell	Young Vic		
2019	Othello	Othello	Richard Twyman	—N/a	Tour; Shanghai date	
2023	Othello	Othello	Sinéad Rushe	Riverside Studios		

== Awards and nominations ==
Year	Award	Category	Work	Result	Ref.
2018	Ian Charleson Awards		Richard II	Nominated	
2021	Screen Actors Guild Awards	Outstanding Performance by an Ensemble in a Drama Series	Bridgerton	Nominated	
2025	Screen Actors Guild Awards	Outstanding Performance by an Ensemble in a Drama Series	Bridgerton	Nominated	
