= Bridgerton =

American romance television series

- Genre: Alternate history; Regency romance
- Created by: Chris Van Dusen
- Based on: Bridgerton by Julia Quinn
- Showrunners: Chris Van Dusen; Jess Brownell
- Starring: Several: Adjoa Andoh; Lorraine Ashbourne; Jonathan Bailey; Ruby Barker; Sabrina Bartlett; Harriet Cains; Bessie Carter; Nicola Coughlan; Phoebe Dynevor; Ruth Gemmell; Florence Hunt; Claudia Jessie; Ben Miller; Luke Newton; Regé-Jean Page; Golda Rosheuvel; Luke Thompson; Will Tilston; Polly Walker; Martins Imhangbe; Simone Ashley; Charithra Chandran; Shelley Conn; Calam Lynch; Rupert Young; Victor Alli; Joanna Bobin; Dominic Coleman; Hannah Dodd; Daniel Francis; Jessica Madsen; Hannah New; Masali Baduza; Yerin Ha; Katie Leung; Emma Naomi; Hugh Sachs
- Narrated by: Julie Andrews
- Theme music composer: Kris Bowers; Michael Dean Parsons
- Composer: Kris Bowers
- Country of origin: United States
- Original language: English
- No. of seasons: 4
- No. of episodes: 32 (list of episodes)

Production
- Executive producers: Shonda Rhimes; Betsy Beers; Chris Van Dusen; Julie Anne Robinson
- Producers: Sarada McDermott; Holden Chang; Sarah Dollard
- Editor: Jim Flynn
- Running time: 52–73 minutes
- Production companies: Shondaland; CVD Productions

Original release
- Network: Netflix
- Release: December 25, 2020 – present

Related
- Queen Charlotte: A Bridgerton Story

Bridgerton is an American alternative history, Regency romance television series created by Chris Van Dusen for Netflix. Based on the book series of the same name by Julia Quinn, it is Shondaland's first scripted show for Netflix. The series stars an ensemble cast, led by Phoebe Dynevor, Rege-Jean Page, Jonathan Bailey, Simone Ashley, Adjoa Andoh, Nicola Coughlan, Ruth Gemmell, Claudia Jessie, Luke Newton, Golda Rosheuvel, Luke Thompson, Yerin Ha, Hannah Dodd, Masali Baduza and Polly Walker.

Narrated by Julie Andrews, it follows the close-knit siblings of the noble and influential Bridgerton family as they navigate the highly competitive social season, where young marriageable members of the ton, consisting of nobility and gentry, are introduced into society. The series is set during the early 19th century, in an alternative London Regency era, in which George III established racial equality and granted aristocratic titles to people of color due to Queen Charlotte's fictionalized African heritage within the series.

The first season debuted on December 25, 2020. The second season premiered on March 25, 2022. The third season was released in two parts, which premiered on May 16 and June 13, 2024, respectively. The fourth season was again released in two parts, premiering on January 29 and February 26, 2026, respectively. The series has been renewed for a fifth and sixth season. Additionally, Queen Charlotte: A Bridgerton Story, a prequel series focusing on Queen Charlotte, was released in May 2023, between the second and third series. A second prequel, focusing on Violet Bridgerton, is in development.

Bridgerton has been positively received for its direction, actors' performances, production and set design, winning five Primetime Creative Arts Emmy Awards, a Make-Up Artists And Hair Stylists Guild Awards, and nominations at the Primetime Emmy Awards, Screen Actors Guild Awards, Satellite Awards and NAACP Image Awards. The music score by Kris Bowers earned a Grammy Award nomination for Best Score Soundtrack for Visual Media.

== Premise ==
Set against the backdrop of the Regency era, the eight siblings of the noble and powerful Bridgerton family – Anthony, Benedict, Colin, Daphne, Eloise, Francesca, Gregory, and Hyacinth – navigate London high society in search of love, surrounded by friends and rivals.

== Cast and characters ==
=== Main ===
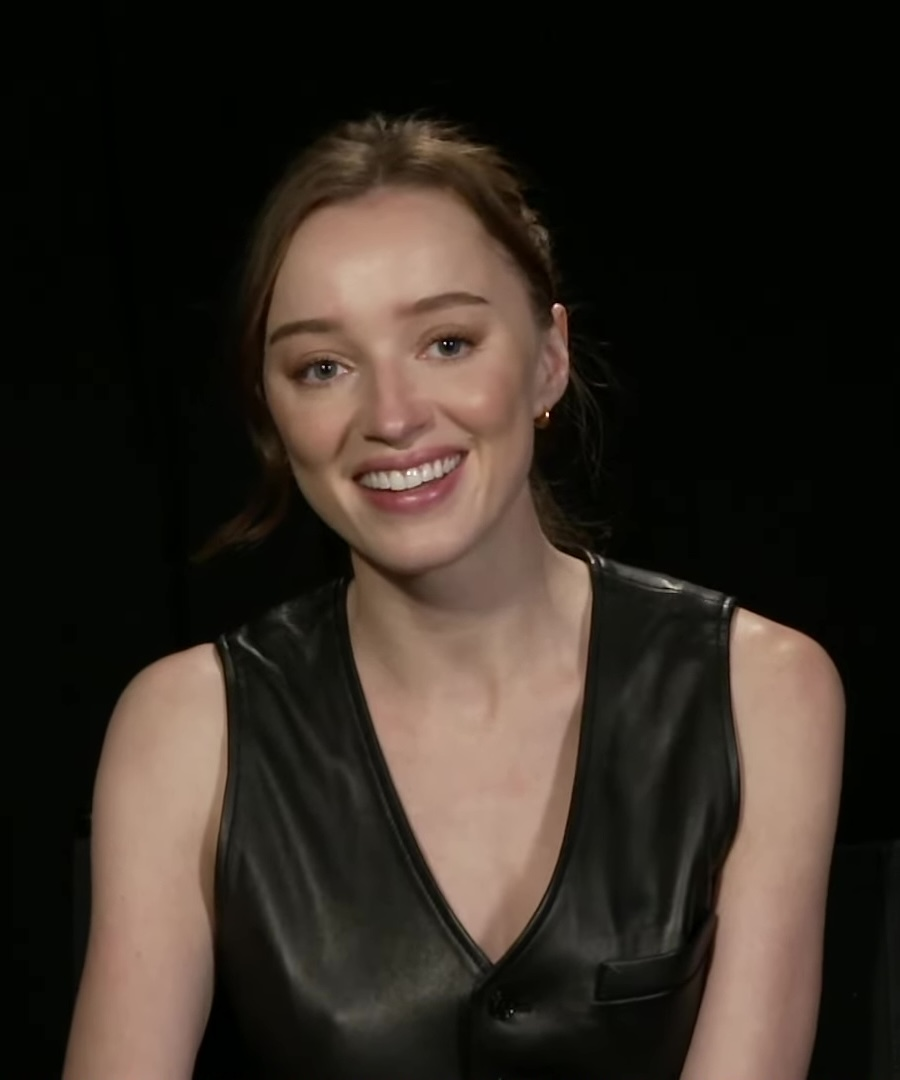
Phoebe Dynevor plays Daphne Basset (née Bridgerton), Duchess of Hastings

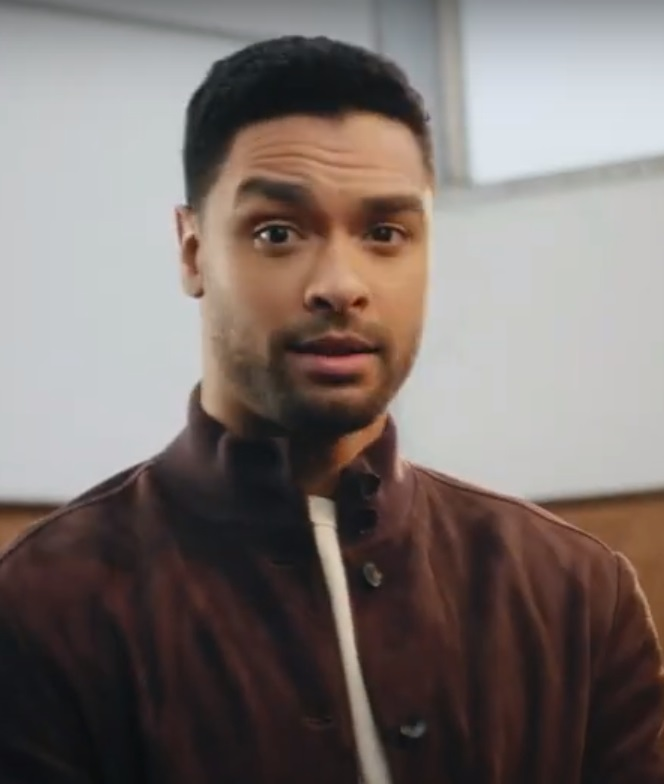
Regé-Jean Page plays Simon Basset, Duke of Hastings

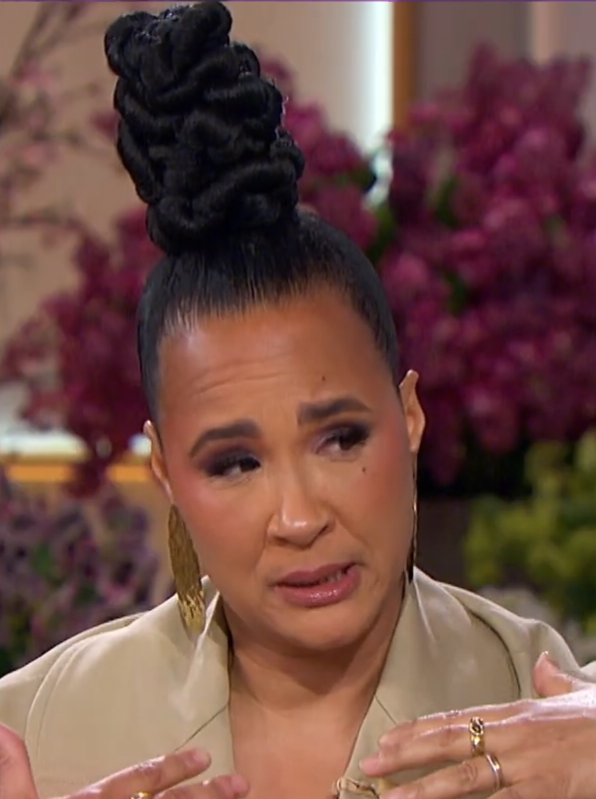
Golda Rosheuvel plays Queen Charlotte of the United Kingdom

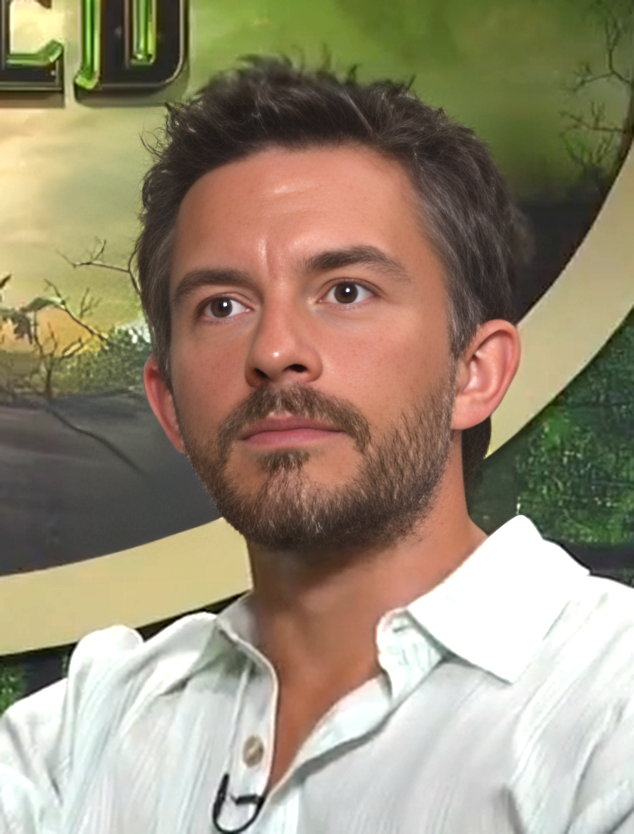
Jonathan Bailey plays Anthony Bridgerton, 9th Viscount Bridgerton

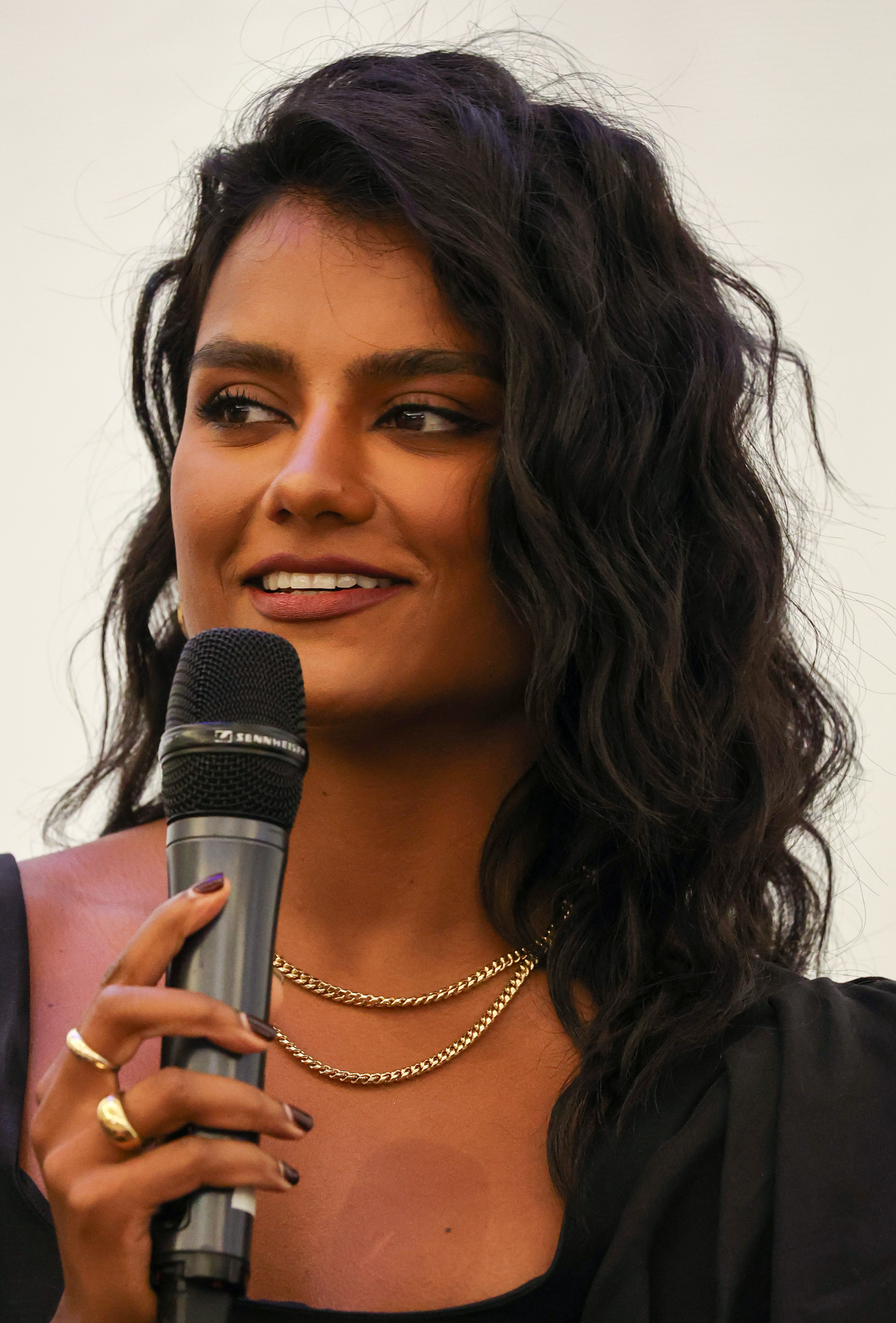
Simone Ashley plays Kathani "Kate" (née Sharma) Viscountess Bridgerton

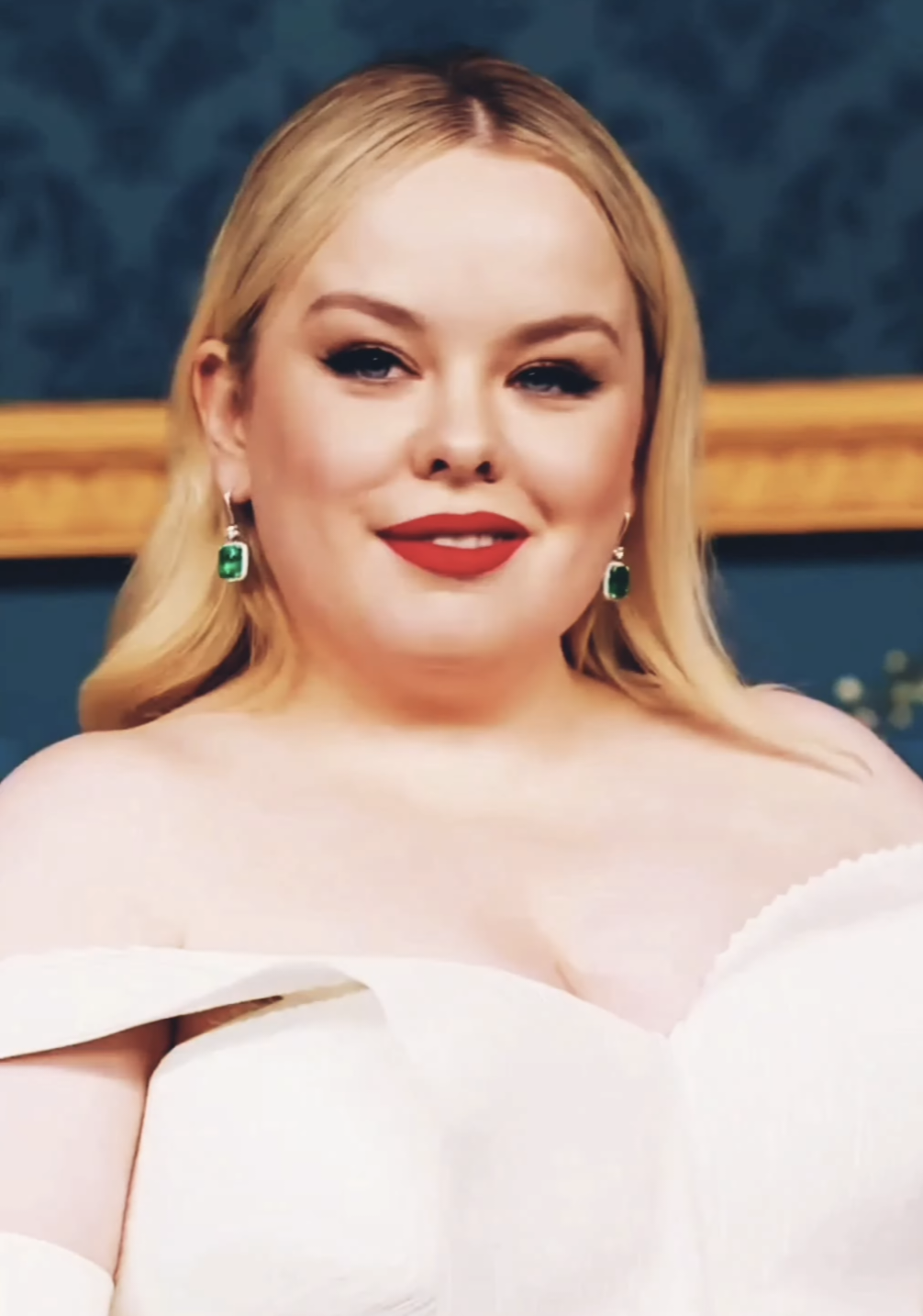
Nicola Coughlan plays Penelope Bridgerton (née Featherington)

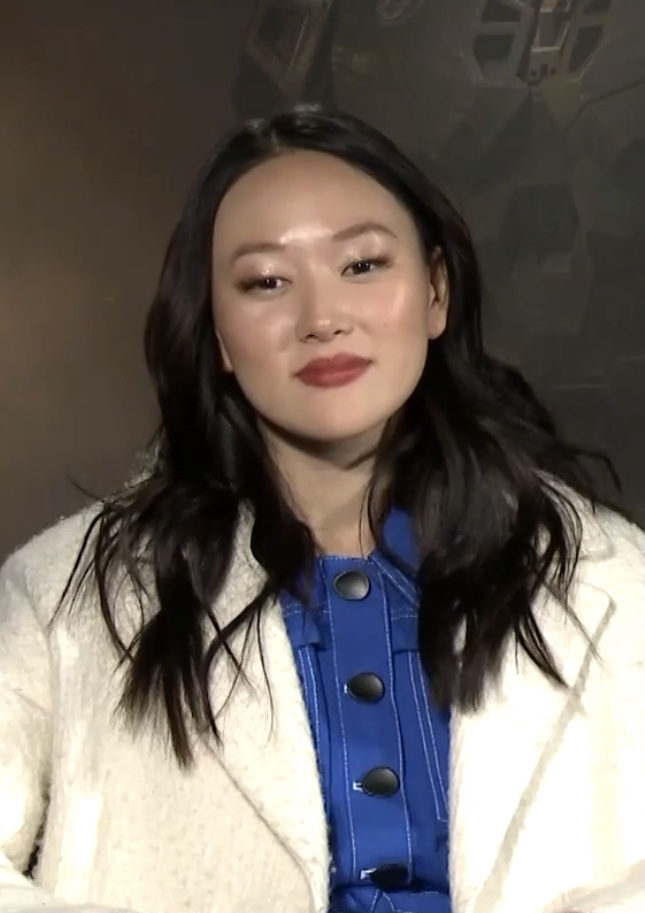
Yerin Ha plays Sophie Bridgerton (née Baek)

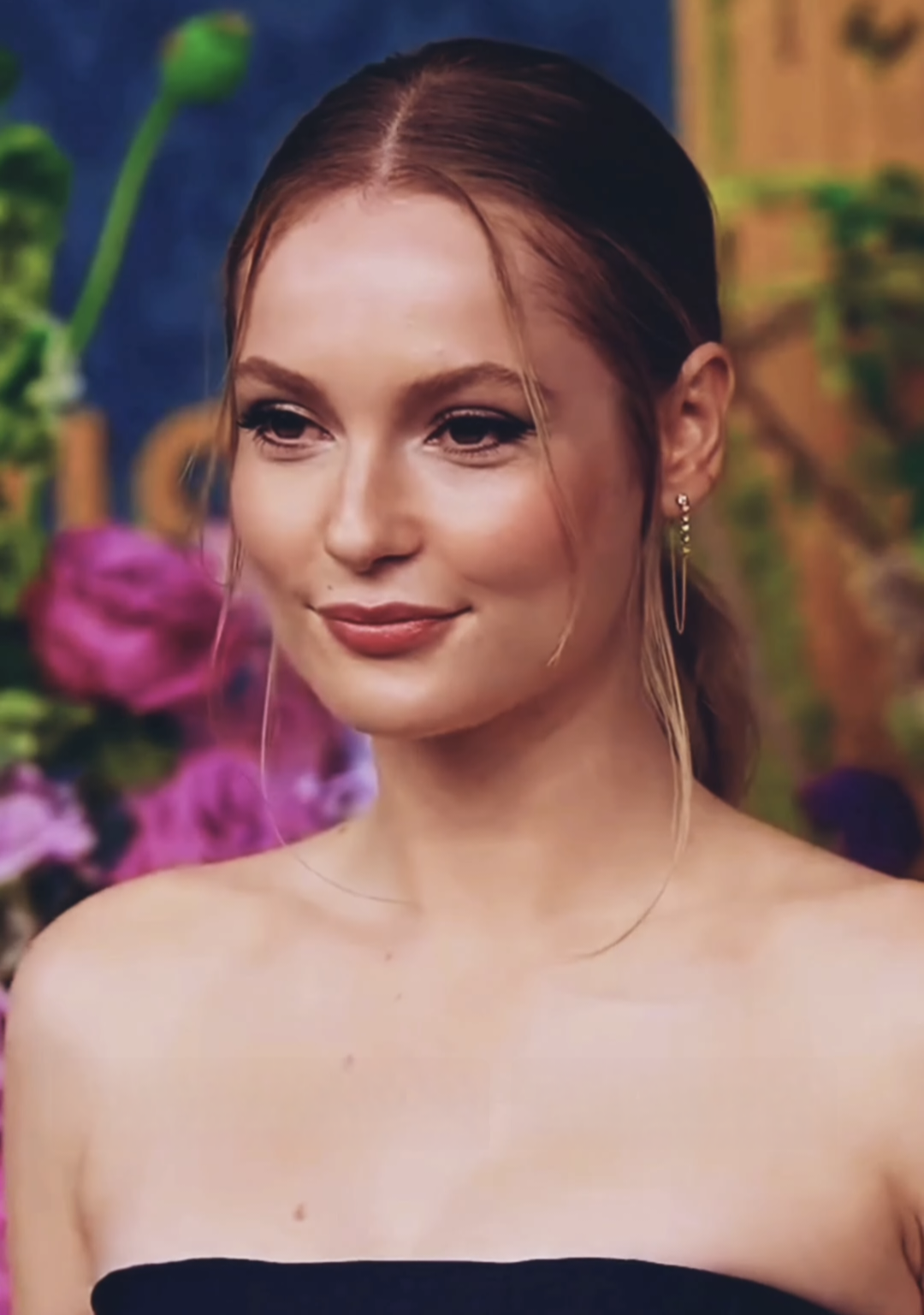
Hannah Dodd plays Francesca Stirling (née Bridgerton), Countess of Kilmartin

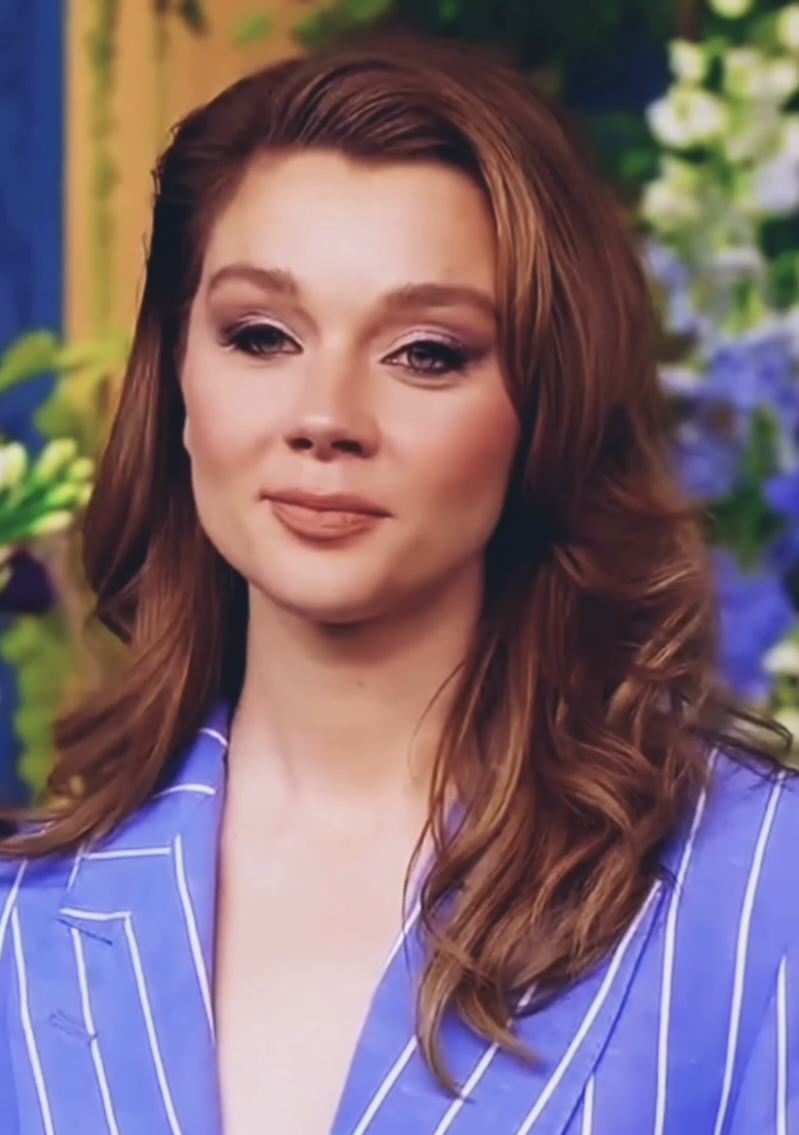
Claudia Jessie plays Eloise Bridgerton

- Adjoa Andoh as Lady Agatha Danbury (née Soma Anderson), (Note: Andoh does not appear and is not credited as a series regular in the sixth episode of the first season.) the sharp-tongued, insightful doyenne of the ton
- Lorraine Ashbourne as Mrs. Varley, (Note: Ashbourne is credited as a series regular in the episodes which she appears in.) the Featheringtons' housekeeper
- Jonathan Bailey as Lord Anthony Bridgerton, (Note: In seasons 3 and 4, Bailey is credited as a series regular in the episodes which he appears in.) 9th Viscount Bridgerton, the eldest Bridgerton son and head of the family; husband of Kathani "Kate", Viscountess Bridgerton (née Sharma) and the father of Edmund Bridgerton II
- Ruby Barker (season 1; guest: season 2) as Marina, Lady Crane (née Thompson), a Featherington cousin from a rural gentry family
- Sabrina Bartlett (season 1) (Note: Bartlett is credited as a series regular in the first, third, fourth, seventh and eighth episodes.) as Siena Rosso, an opera singer and Anthony's former lover
- Harriet Cains (seasons 1–3; guest: season 4) (Note: In season 2, Cains is credited as a series regular in the first, second and eighth episodes.) as Philippa Finch (née Featherington), the middle Featherington daughter, wife of Albion Finch and mother of Philomena Finch
- Bessie Carter (seasons 1–3) as Prudence Dankworth (née Featherington), the eldest Featherington daughter, wife of Harry Dankworth and mother of their unnamed daughter
- Nicola Coughlan as Penelope Bridgerton (née Featherington), the youngest Featherington daughter, wife of Colin Bridgerton and the mother of Elliot Bridgerton, the current Baron Featherington (Lord Featherington)
- Phoebe Dynevor (season 1–2) (Note: In season 2, Dynevor is credited as a series regular in the first, third, fourth, sixth and eighth episodes.) as Daphne Basset (née Bridgerton), Duchess of Hastings, the fourth Bridgerton child and eldest daughter; wife of Simon Basset, Duke of Hastings and the mother of August "Augie" Basset
- Ruth Gemmell as Lady Violet Bridgerton, Dowager Viscountess Bridgerton (née Ledger), mother of the Bridgerton children
- Florence Hunt as Hyacinth Bridgerton, the eighth and youngest Bridgerton child
- Claudia Jessie as Eloise Bridgerton, the fifth Bridgerton child and second daughter
- Ben Miller (season 1) as Lord Archibald Featherington, Baron Featherington, the patriarch of the Featherington family
- Luke Newton as Colin Bridgerton, (Note: In season 2, Newton does not appear and is credited as a series regular in the first episode.) the third Bridgerton son, husband of Penelope Bridgerton (née Featherington) and father of Elliot Bridgerton, the current Baron Featherington (Lord Featherington)
- Regé-Jean Page (season 1) as Simon Basset, Duke of Hastings, one of London's most eligible bachelors who marries Daphne Bridgerton, and the father of August "Augie" Basset
- Golda Rosheuvel as Queen Charlotte of the United Kingdom, (Note: Rosheuvel is credited as a series regular in the episodes which she appears in.) the leader of the ton and wife of King George III
- Luke Thompson as Benedict Bridgerton, the second Bridgerton son and husband of Sophie Bridgerton (née Baek)
- Will Tilston as Gregory Bridgerton, (Note: In season 4, Tilston is credited as a series regular in the episodes which he appears in.) the seventh Bridgerton child and youngest son
- Polly Walker as Lady Portia Featherington, Dowager Baroness Featherington, (Note: In season 4, Walker is credited as a series regular in the episodes which she appears in.) the matriarch of the Featherington family
- Julie Andrews as the voice of Lady Whistledown, the author of a scandalous society newsletter
- Martins Imhangbe as Will Mondrich, (Note: Imhangbe is credited as a series regular in the episodes where he appears.) a gentleman's club owner, retired boxer, and confidant of the Duke of Hastings
- Simone Ashley (season 2–present) (Note: In seasons 3 and 4, Ashley is credited as a series regular in the episodes which she appears in.) as Kathani "Kate", Viscountess Bridgerton (née Sharma), wife of Anthony and mother of Edmund Bridgerton II
- Charithra Chandran (season 2) as Edwina Sharma, Kate's younger half-sister
- Shelley Conn (season 2) as Lady Mary Sharma (née Sheffield), Kate's stepmother and Edwina's mother
- Calam Lynch (season 2) (Note: Lynch is credited as a series regular in the episodes where he appears.) as Theo Sharpe, an apprentice at the printing shop used by Lady Whistledown who befriends Eloise
- Rupert Young (season 2) as Jack, Baron Featherington, the new head of the Featherington family
- Victor Alli (season 3–4) (Note: Alli is credited a series regular in the first episode, and from the third episode of the third season through the sixth episode of the fourth season. He does not appear and is not credited in the second episode of the third season.) as John Stirling, Earl of Kilmartin. Late husband of Francesca (née Bridgerton)
- Joanna Bobin (season 3; recurring: season 1–2) as Lady Cowper, Cressida's mother
- Dominic Coleman (season 3; recurring: season 2) (Note: Coleman is credited as a series regular in the episodes which he appears in.) as Lord Cowper, Cressida's father
- Ruby Stokes (recurring: season 1–2) and Hannah Dodd (season 3–present) as Francesca Stirling (née Bridgerton), Dowager Countess of Kilmartin, the sixth Bridgerton child and third daughter. Widow of John Stirling, Earl of Kilmartin
- Daniel Francis (season 3–present) (Note: Francis does not appear and is not credited as a series regular in the second episode of the third season.) as Marcus Anderson, Lady Danbury's brother
- Jessica Madsen (season 3–present; recurring: seasons 1–2) (Note: In season 4, Madsen is credited as a series regular in the sixth and eighth episodes.) as Cressida Gun, Countess of Penwood (née Cowper), an ill-mannered debutante competing with Daphne and Penelope. In season 4, she is now the new Lady Penwood, the wife of the new Earl of Penwood
- Hannah New (season 3) (Note: New does not appear and is not credited as a series regular in the second episode.) as Lady Tilley Arnold, a widow who has a fling with Benedict
- Masali Baduza (season 4–present; guest: season 3) (Note: Baduza is credited as a series regular from the fourth episode onwards.) as Michaela Stirling, John's cousin
- Yerin Ha (season 4) as Sophie Bridgerton (née Baek), Benedict's wife
- Katie Leung (season 4) as Lady Araminta Gun, Dowager Countess of Penwood, Rosamund and Posy's mother and Sophie's stepmother
- Emma Naomi (season 4–present; recurring seasons 1–3) (Note: Naomi does not appear and is not credited as a series regular in the second episode.) as Alice Mondrich, Will Mondrich's wife and in season 4 Queen Charlotte's lady-in-waiting
- Hugh Sachs (season 4–present; recurring seasons 1–3) as Brimsley, the Queen's gossip-mongering secretary and Queen's man
- Tega Alexander (season 5) as Christopher Anderson, a Regency-era bachelor and Casanova. Christopher is the son of Lord Anderson.
- Jacqueline Boatswain (season 5) as Helen Stirling, mother of Michaela Stirling.
- Gemma Knight Jones (season 5) as Lady Elizabeth Ashworth, a well-connected member of the high society who takes on a mentoring role for Michaela Stirling.

=== Recurring ===
- Geraldine Alexander as Mrs. Wilson, the Bridgertons' housekeeper
- Jason Barnett as Jeffries, the Bassets' butler (season 1)
- Kathryn Drysdale as Genevieve Delacroix, a high society modiste (season 1–3)
- Oli Higginson as John, a footman in the Bridgerton household often working for Eloise
- Simon Ludders as Humboldt, the Bridgertons' butler (season 1)
- Molly McGlynn as Rose Nolan, Daphne's loyal maid and confidant (season 1)
- Julian Ovenden as Sir Henry Granville, an artist who befriends Benedict (season 1)
- Caleb Obediah as Lord Charles Cho, a society gentleman (season 2–4)
- Bert Seymour as Lord Fife, a society gentleman (season 2–4)
- Sam Battersea as Lady Barragan, Winifred Barragan's mother (season 3)
- Ella Bruccoleri as Winifred Barragan, a debutant with Francesca (season 3)
- Genevieve Chenneour as Clara Livingston, a fellow debutante with Francesca (season 3)
- Kitty Devlin as Lady Dolores Allison (née Stowell), a fellow debutante with Francesca (season 3–4)
- Rosa Hesmondhalgh as Rae, maid and confidant to Penelope Bridgerton (née Featherington) (seasons 3 and 4)
- Sesly Hope as Lady Emma Cho (née Kenworthy), a debutante with Francesca (season 3–4)
- Molly Jackson-Shaw as Anne Hartigan, a debutante with Francesca (season 3)
- Lorn Macdonald as Albion Finch, Philippa Featherington's husband (season 3; guest season 1–2, 4)
- Sam Phillips as Lord Alfred Debling, a suitor who courts Penelope (season 3)
- James Phoon as Harry Dankworth, Prudence Featherington's husband (season 3; guest season 4)
- Vineeta Rishi as Lady Malhotra, Sita Malhotra's mother (season 3–4)
- Banita Sandhu as Sita Malhotra, a fellow debutante with Francesca (season 3)
- Anna Wilson-Jones as Lady Livingston, Clara Livingston's mother (season 3)
- Sophie Woolley as Lady Stowell, Dolores Allison's mother (season 3)
- Michelle Mao as Rosamund Li, Araminta's older daughter and one of Sophie's stepsisters (season 4)
- Isabella Wei as Posy Li, Araminta's younger daughter, one of Sophie's stepsisters (season 4)
- Fiona Marr as Irma Gibbons, a cook at Penwood House (season 4)
- Gracie McGonigal as Hazel, a maid at Bridgerton House (season 4)
- David Moorst as Alfie, a footman at Penwood House (season 4)

=== Guest ===
- Jamie Beamish as Nigel, Baron Berbrooke, Daphne's suitor (season 1)
- Caroline Quentin as Lady Berbrooke, Nigel's mother (season 1)
- Freddie Stroma as Prince Frederick of Prussia, the Queen's grandnephew (season 1)
- Amy Beth Hayes as Lady Trowbridge, the hedonistic widow of an earl (season 1)
- James Fleet as King George III, the King of the United Kingdom of Great Britain and Ireland (season 1–2)
- Céline Buckens as Kitty Langham, a general's wife (season 1)
- Chris Fulton as Sir Philip Crane, Marina's husband, a baronet (season 1–2)
- Daphne Di Cinto as Sarah Basset, Duchess of Hastings, Simon's mother (season 1)
- Richard Pepple as the Duke of Hastings, Simon's father (season 1)
- Pippa Haywood as Mrs. Colson, the housekeeper at the Hastings' country estate (season 1)
- Anthony Head as Lord Sheffield, Lady Mary's father and Edwina's grandfather (season 2)
- Shobu Kapoor as Lady Sheffield, Lady Mary's mother and Edwina's grandmother (season 2)
- Rupert Evans as Edmund, 8th Viscount Bridgerton, late father of the Bridgerton children (season 2)
- Zak Ford-Williams as Lord Remington, Lady Whistledown's greatest fan (season 3)
- Jude Powell as Lord Allison, husband of Lady Dolores Allison (season 4)
- Zheng Xi Yong as Lord Barnaby, suitor of Posy Li (season 4)

== Episodes ==
Season	Episodes		Originally released
1	8		December 25, 2020
2	8		March 25, 2022
3	8	4	May 16, 2024
3	8	4	June 13, 2024
4	8	4	January 29, 2026
4	8	4	February 26, 2026

=== Season 1 (2020) ===
The first season is based on the novel The Duke and I.

No. overall	No. in season	Title	Directed by	Teleplay by	Original release date
1	1	"Diamond of the First Water"	Julie Anne Robinson	Chris Van Dusen	December 25, 2020
The 1813 season begins, and a scandal sheet written by the mysterious "Lady Whistledown" starts circulating London. Daphne Bridgerton makes her debut into society along with the three Featherington sisters, including Penelope; Daphne is given high praise by Queen Charlotte. Daphne's older brother, Anthony, Viscount Bridgerton, drives away many potential suitors except the detestable Lord Berbrooke, and her popularity threatens to be eclipsed by Marina Thompson, Penelope's cousin. Meanwhile, Simon Basset, the new Duke of Hastings and an old friend of Anthony's, returns to London upon his father's death. His old acquaintance Lady Danbury coaxes him into joining the season, where he encounters both Anthony and Daphne. After breaking up with his mistress, Siena Rosso, Anthony promises a horrified Daphne to Berbrooke. Lady Featherington confronts Marina, having deduced that she is pregnant. Later on, after following her from an event, Berbrooke accosts Daphne, and she punches him in self-defense. Having arrived moments before, Simon suggests to her that they pretend to court to enhance her prospects and free him from any of his own. Daphne agrees, and the new couple instantly draws attention from the ton.
2	2	"Shock and Delight"	Tom Verica	Janet Lin	December 25, 2020
Flashbacks reveal Simon's tragic childhood. After his mother died in childbirth, Simon's cruel father rejected him upon discovering his stammer. Lady Danbury came to his aid, supervising his education and helping him to overcome his speech issues. Despite this, Simon's father showed him no love at all and only ever saw him as the heir to his legacy. As revenge for his father's negligence, Simon vows to him at his deathbed that he will never sire an heir. Penelope shares her confusion with Eloise Bridgerton as to how a child is conceived; Marina is confined to her room by Lady Featherington but shares with Penelope that her pregnancy came from a man named Sir George Crane, a soldier. Simon and Daphne's ruse works perfectly, but Anthony is upset by Simon's supposed pursuit of his sister. When Simon tells Anthony what Lord Berbrooke tried to do to Daphne, Anthony breaks his agreement with Lord Berbrooke. However, Berbrooke acquires a special marriage license and threatens to ruin Daphne's name. Lady Bridgerton intervenes and is able to influence Lady Whistledown to reveal a scandal that forces Berbrooke to leave London.
3	3	"Art of the Swoon"	Tom Verica	Leila Cohan-Miccio	December 25, 2020
Daphne turns down multiple proposals as she grows closer to Simon. Lady Featherington tries to find a match for Marina, but she insists on waiting for word from George. Determined to prove that she is still the true ruler of London society, the Queen schemes to match Daphne with her nephew, Prince Friedrich of Prussia. Lady Danbury tells Simon that he needs to propose to Daphne or step aside, and Simon reluctantly calls off the fake courtship. Benedict Bridgerton suspects Eloise of being Lady Whistledown, but instead learns they are both dissatisfied with their prospects. Anthony tries to reconcile with Siena, but she turns him down. Marina receives a letter from George stating his refusal to take responsibility for her child, but the letter was forged by Lady Featherington. Lady Bridgerton pushes Anthony to think about a match for himself. Simon decides to leave London early as a heartbroken Daphne embraces Prince Friedrich's attentions.
4	4	"An Affair of Honor"	Sheree Folkson	Abby McDonald	December 25, 2020
Prince Friedrich gifts Daphne a necklace to show his interest. Marina is presented to older suitors in want of heirs to marry her off quickly. Eloise tries to uncover Lady Whistledown's identity. Marina is saved from an elderly suitor by Colin Bridgerton, one of her many early admirers. Anthony tells Daphne that Friedrich asked for his consent to propose. During a ball, an undecided Daphne flees to the garden, where Simon approaches her to say goodbye and apologize. Upset, Daphne runs into a hedge maze; Simon follows, and the two share a passionate kiss, but are discovered by Anthony. Anthony furiously demands that they marry; when Simon refuses, he challenges him to a duel at dawn. Penelope is crushed by Colin's interest in Marina, having secretly loved him for years. Anthony plans to use the duel to free himself from society and be with Siena. Lady Featherington discovers her husband's gambling debts, and deduces that their daughters will be deprived of dowries and they will be forced to continue accommodating Marina. Daphne realizes that Cressida Cowper, her rival for Prince Friedrich's affections, witnessed what happened in the garden and races to stop the duel. Simon claims that he cannot marry her because he cannot provide her with children. Weighing her options, Daphne firmly declares they will marry anyway.
5	5	"The Duke and I"	Sheree Folkson	Joy C Mitchell	December 25, 2020
Daphne and Simon petition for a special marriage license, but are refused due to the Queen's ire at Daphne rejecting her nephew. As money issues plague the Featherington home, Penelope grows more jealous of Colin's interest in Marina and wary of Marina's motives. Benedict is invited to a party by the artist Sir Henry Granville. Lady Featherington orders Marina to stop pursuing Colin, but Marina assures her she has a plan. Simon and Daphne appeal to the Queen for an early wedding; with King George growing more incapacitated, the Queen is moved by Simon's impassioned plea. Simon and Daphne are married. Following an unsuccessful attempt to seduce him, Marina receives a proposal from Colin at the wedding reception, but is dismayed to learn he wishes for a long engagement. The Queen takes interest in Eloise's investigation into Lady Whistledown's identity. Lady Bridgerton's attempts to explain a wedding night leave Daphne with more questions than answers. On their way to Simon's family home, he and Daphne spend the night at an inn. Daphne finally confronts Simon over his indifference towards her, spurring him to confess that his declaration of love was genuine, and Daphne confesses she feels the same; despite Daphne's lack of awareness, the pair consummate their marriage.
6	6	"Swish"	Julie Anne Robinson	Sarah Dollard	December 25, 2020
Simon and Daphne arrive at Clyvedon and enjoy their honeymoon. Daphne has difficulty building a relationship with Clyvedon's housekeeper Mrs. Colson and the local villagers. Colin announces his engagement to Marina, to the dismay of his family and Penelope. Penelope tells Colin that Marina is in love with another man, but he is unbothered and suggests to Marina that they should marry sooner by traveling to Scotland. Daphne learns from Mrs. Colson about Simon's upbringing. Penelope deduces that George's letter was faked, but Marina chooses to marry Colin anyway. Marina realizes Penelope loves him, and bluntly condemns Penelope's feelings, reducing Penelope to tears. With the help of her lady's maid, Daphne figures out that Simon could have children if he chose to, but is deliberately withdrawing early to avoid impregnating her. Later, while having sex with Simon, she holds him down so he cannot withdraw, and confronts him afterward, accusing him of lying to her about being infertile. Just as Colin and Marina prepare to elope, Lady Whistledown publishes Marina's pregnancy, exposing her.
7	7	"Oceans Apart"	Alrick Riley	Jay Ross & Abby McDonald	December 25, 2020
Amid their marital dispute, Daphne decides to return to London to assist in undoing the scandal surrounding Colin. Simon willingly joins her, but now wishes to live separately from Daphne if she is not with child. Eloise continues to investigate Lady Whistledown, now desiring to restore the Featherington name. Colin is devastated to learn Marina was using him to secure a future for her baby; Daphne, feeling sympathetic, offers to help Marina find George. The Queen grows irritable at Eloise's failure to uncover Lady Whistledown and later throws the Featheringtons out of her luncheon. Daphne enlists the help of a general's wife to locate Sir George. Lord Featherington approaches boxer Will Mondrich to convince him to throw his next fight; Will considers it, as the money Lord Featherington has offered could ensure his family's security. Daphne learns Simon swore to his father he would not have children, but still does not understand why. Eloise concludes that modiste Genevieve Delacroix is the most likely candidate for Lady Whistledown's true identity. Marina attempts to induce a miscarriage, and Penelope finds her unconscious. At the opera, Daphne learns she is not pregnant; she cries in her mother's arms, with Simon in earshot.
8	8	"After the Rain"	Alrick Riley	Chris Van Dusen	December 25, 2020
George's brother Sir Philip Crane arrives to tell Marina that George died in battle. Philip offers to marry Marina himself, but she turns him down believing she has ended her pregnancy. Eloise confronts Genevieve and, believing her to be Lady Whistledown, tries to covertly convince her to restore the Featheringtons' honor. Daphne learns of Simon's childhood from Lady Danbury. Simon reconsiders what he wants after spending time with Daphne's younger siblings. Siena rejects Anthony's attempts to bring her into the ton, saying that he should move on. Lord Featherington makes a bet against Will with ill-reputed bookmakers; Will throws the fight and receives half of Lord Featherington's winnings, while the latter is subsequently murdered by the bookmakers. Marina accepts Philip's proposal after discovering that she is still pregnant, and departs London with him. Penelope considers confessing her love to Colin, but before she can, he reveals that he is leaving the country to travel. The Queen's agents attempt to capture Lady Whistledown, but Eloise prevents it. Daphne and Simon reconcile during their ball. Anthony announces that he has decided to marry, but without love. Eloise realizes that Genevieve cannot be Lady Whistledown, revealed solely to the audience to be Penelope. In a flash-forward, Daphne and Simon have their first child, a son.

=== Season 2 (2022) ===
The second season is based on the novel The Viscount Who Loved Me.

No. overall	No. in season	Title	Directed by	Teleplay by	Original release date
9	1	"Capital R Rake"	Tricia Brock	Chris Van Dusen	March 25, 2022
10	2	"Off to the Races"	Tricia Brock	Daniel Robinson	March 25, 2022
11	3	"A Bee in Your Bonnet"	Alex Pillai	Sarah L. Thompson	March 25, 2022
12	4	"Victory"	Alex Pillai	Chris Van Dusen & Jess Brownell	March 25, 2022
13	5	"An Unthinkable Fate"	Tom Verica	Abby McDonald	March 25, 2022
14	6	"The Choice"	Tom Verica	Lou-Lou Igbokwe	March 25, 2022
15	7	"Harmony"	Cheryl Dunye	Oliver Goldstick	March 25, 2022
16	8	"The Viscount Who Loved Me"	Cheryl Dunye	Jess Brownell	March 25, 2022

=== Season 3 (2024) ===
The third season is based on the novel Romancing Mister Bridgerton.

No. overall	No. in season	Title	Directed by	Teleplay by	Original release date
Part 1
17	1	"Out of the Shadows"	Tricia Brock	Jess Brownell	May 16, 2024
Colin returns from abroad and charms the ladies of the ton, though Penelope is not thrilled due to his previous unkind remarks. Francesca Bridgerton has made her debut to society, although she is more shy than her siblings and would rather yearn for peace to play her piano amidst the social whirlwind. Meanwhile, Eloise has transformed and is now interested in fashion, and she is friends with Cressida Cowper, to Violet Bridgerton's dismay, after Eloise's falling out with Penelope. Queen Charlotte is not very interested in the debutantes, despite Lady Whistledown's praise. Lady Portia Featherington is preoccupied with ensuring her daughters secure heirs to maintain their estate. Meanwhile, Penelope, feeling stifled by her family, undergoes a makeover. The Mondrich family's young son unexpectedly inherits the title of Baron of Kent, bringing wealth and thrusting them into society. At the Danbury ball, Penelope's new look turns heads but leads to a humiliating incident orchestrated by Cressida, leaving Penelope fleeing and Colin in pursuit. He tries to apologize, unaware of the Whistledown scandal she wrote about him. Later, Colin apologizes to Penelope and offers to help her find a husband, mending their friendship. However, Penelope faces the fallout of her biting Whistledown piece as Colin vows to unmask the scandal-sheet author, threatening her secret identity.
18	2	"How Bright the Moon"	Tricia Brock	Sarah L. Thompson	May 16, 2024
Queen Charlotte remains unfazed by Lady Whistledown's gossip and takes her time in choosing the season's diamond. Instead of rushing, she decides to let the girls impress her, potentially causing chaos. The Mondriches move into a grand estate but are unhappy with its formality, their separate bedrooms and the out-of-style dresses Mrs. Mondrich inherits; she plans to alter them to fit in. Lady Danbury shares information with the Bridgertons, and Portia Featherington interrogates her daughters about their marital relations. Penelope and Colin's relationship deepens through flirting lessons to test her skills on a promenade, revealing a charming backstory. Colin helps Penelope navigate social interactions at a ball, leading to humorous and awkward moments. Eloise accidentally spreads Colin and Penelope's arrangement to the ton, sparking a scandal and causing friction between Colin and Eloise. Lady Featherington instructs her daughters in sexual insights to produce an heir and avoid losing the estate. To avoid further suspicion, Penelope writes about herself in Whistledown. Penelope's self-doubt leads her to ask Colin for a kiss, resulting in a passionate moment that suggests deeper feelings.
19	3	"Forces of Nature"	Andrew Ahn	Eli Wilson Pelton	May 16, 2024
Colin is distracted by his growing feelings for Penelope. Eloise apologizes for spreading the gossip, but still keeps her distance from Penelope. Lady Cowper warns Cressida that Lord Cowper is threatening to cut them off unless Cressida marries. She sets her sights on Lord Debling just as he starts to show interest in Penelope. Philippa finally succeeds in getting pregnant, to Portia's delight and Prudence's dismay. The Mondriches start choosing their own wardrobe, impressing the ton. Will wants to hold onto his club, despite society not accepting it. During a balloon launch, Benedict meets a very opinionated woman, revealed to be Lady Tilley Arnold. After naming Francesca her "sparkler", Queen Charlotte introduces her to Lord Samadani, a marquess from Vienna. Overwhelmed by his attention, Francesca retreats from the ball, and meets a handsome stranger. Violet meets Marcus Anderson, Lady Danbury's brother, and the two are attracted to each other. Colin gets advice from Violet about friendship turning into love and tries to confess his feelings to Penelope. However, Lord Debling asks her for a dance, which she accepts, while Colin watches enviously.
20	4	"Old Friends"	Andrew Ahn	Lauren Gamble	May 16, 2024
Penelope's courtship with Lord Debling leads to him asking Portia's permission to propose. Francesca is called on by the handsome stranger she met: John Stirling, Earl of Kilmartin. Benedict starts a relationship with Tilley. Will is adamant to keep his club, despite losing business. After John makes a heartfelt gesture towards Francesca at the queen's ball, she openly rejects Lord Samadani, to Charlotte's dismay. Violet mentions to Marcus how Lady Danbury is a matchmaker; he asks for her help to find him a match, but she flatly refuses. After Colin learns of Debling's impending proposal, he shows up at the ball and interrupts him and Penelope dancing to argue against the match, but Penelope says she will accept Debling's proposal. After learning from Cressida that the Bridgertons and Featheringtons are neighbors, Debling realizes Penelope is in love with Colin, and withdraws his suit. Prudence distracts Portia from Debling's rejection with news that she is also pregnant. Colin chases after Penelope when she leaves the ball, and admits his feelings for her. The two share a passionate exchange in the carriage until they pull up to Colin's house. He gets down, and immediately proposes to Penelope.
Part 2
21	5	"Tick Tock"	Bille Woodruff	Azia Squire	June 13, 2024
Colin announces to the family that he and Penelope are engaged, and Eloise is furious. Eloise secretly asks Penelope if she has told Colin she is Lady Whistledown, and Penelope replies she will tell him as soon as she finds the right time. Anthony and a pregnant Kate return to the city. Cressida tells Eloise that her parents are arranging her marriage with Lord Greer, an old man. Portia falsely believes Penelope has entrapped Colin, but Colin defends Penelope with a declaration of love. Colin and Penelope head to their future home where they make love. Meanwhile, the queen declares a £5000 reward to anyone who can bring evidence about Lady Whistledown's identity. At their engagement party, Eloise figures out that Penelope has not yet told Colin the truth about Lady Whistledown, and she tells her she has until midnight to tell him; otherwise, she will. At the party, the conversation turns to Lady Whistledown, with everyone saying that whoever is Lady Whistledown will be socially ruined and have no marriage prospects, but will have independence and financial freedom. To escape her marriage, Cressida declares herself to be Lady Whistledown as Penelope suffers a panic attack and falls unconscious.
22	6	"Romancing Mister Bridgerton"	Bille Woodruff	Annabelle Hood	June 13, 2024
The queen summons Cressida and asks her to write a new Lady Whistledown herself in order to prove that she is actually Lady Whistledown. Penelope is conflicted on whether letting Cressida take the blame is a good idea or not, and talks with Eloise about it. Meanwhile, Francesca and John Stirling announce that they are engaged, to the family's surprise and happiness, but Violet has misgivings about Francesca's love. Portia talks to Penelope and tells her of her own experience in a bad marriage; the mother and daughter bond. At the Mondrich ball, Marcus tries to speak with Violet, but Lady Danbury instead confronts him, saying he will not steal her friend. She reveals that years ago, he prevented her from trying to flee her marriage with Lord Danbury by informing their father, and Lady Danbury still holds a grudge against her brother for this reason. At the ball, an uninvited Cressida and her mother meet the queen and distribute new copies of Lady Whistledown, secretly written by her mother. Penelope and Eloise are furious, and Penelope writes another Whistledown to get it published the next day, vehemently denying that Cressida is Lady Whistledown. However, unbeknownst to her, Colin follows her and figures out that she is Lady Whistledown.
23	7	"Joining of Hands"	Tom Verica	Geetika Tandon Lizardi	June 13, 2024
An emotionally charged Colin confronts Penelope and expresses his feelings of betrayal and anger. Both copies of Whistledown from Cressida and Penelope arrive the next day, and the queen decides not to reward Cressida. Colin confronts Eloise, and Eloise tells him that she did not reveal the secret to protect him. Colin and Penelope decide to go through with the wedding, but he asks her to stop publishing. Penelope gets advice from Genevieve, who advises her to embrace her true self and continue publishing. On the night before the wedding, Penelope and Colin share an emotionally charged encounter. Colin has a late-night conversation with Anthony and Kate, giving him some perspective. The next day, they both go through with the wedding, but do not mend their rift entirely. John asks Francesca to dance during the wedding, winning Violet over. Lady Danbury and her brother make up after he apologizes to her, and Kate and Anthony decide to travel to India for the birth of their baby. The queen suspects that a Bridgerton is behind Lady Whistledown; she comes to the wedding and confronts them. After the queen leaves, Colin asks Penelope to stop writing due to the threat of the queen, but she replies that this is the only way she could have some freedom, leading to a rocky start in their marriage. That night, Cressida figures out Penelope is Lady Whistledown after visiting a few printing presses.
24	8	"Into the Light"	Tom Verica	Daniel Robinson	June 13, 2024
The day after their wedding, Colin and Penelope face a frosty start to their marriage. Cressida blackmails Penelope for £10,000, threatening to reveal her identity as Lady Whistledown. Cressida exposes Penelope to Portia, leading to an angry confrontation. Portia demands secrecy to avoid annulment, but Penelope informs Colin and Eloise of Cressida's scheme. Colin's attempt to negotiate with Cressida fails, increasing her demands to £20,000. Penelope takes charge, sharing her Whistledown identity with Queen Charlotte and the Bridgerton family. At a ball thrown by her sisters, Penelope publicly confesses, surprising the ton but earning the queen's leniency. Penelope's assertiveness rekindles her relationship with Colin and they reconcile. Meanwhile, Benedict explores his romantic boundaries by enjoying bedding both Lady Arnold and her friend Paul, but after Lady Arnold expresses a desire to be in a committed relationship with only him, Benedict separates from both Lady Arnold and Paul, as an exclusive relationship is not what he wants right now. Francesca and John get married and plan to move to Scotland with John's cousin, Michaela; Eloise asks to join, to which Francesca agrees. The episode concludes with a flash-forward revealing Penelope and Colin as happy parents of the new Lord Featherington and both successful authors, with Penelope retiring Lady Whistledown to write under her own name.

=== Season 4 (2026) ===
The fourth season is based on the novel An Offer from a Gentleman.

No. overall	No. in season	Title	Directed by	Teleplay by	Original release date
Part 1
25	1	"The Waltz"	Tom Verica	Jess Brownell	January 29, 2026
Eloise, Francesca, and her husband Lord John Stirling Kilmartin return from Scotland, while Anthony and Kate remain in India with their newborn. Violet discovers Benedict has spent the night at his bachelor lodgings with two women and pressures him to settle down. Penelope is conflicted by her role as Lady Whistledown, playing it safe with her gossip to avoid causing harm. Eloise has resolved to become a spinster. Hyacinth is eager to debut. Violet hosts a masquerade ball to open the season. Queen Charlotte, tired of championing debutantes, selects Benedict as the season's catch. Lady Danbury's wish to travel to her ancestral homeland is rejected by Charlotte. Sophie Baek, a maid employed by the twice-widowed Lady Araminta Gun and her daughters Rosamund and Posy, attends the ball under cover of a mask. Benedict is captivated by her, intervenes when another man tries to claim her for a dance, and the two share a dance and a kiss on a private terrace. When the clock strikes midnight, Sophie flees, leaving only a glove behind.
26	2	"Time Transfixed"	Jaffar Mahmood	Azia Squire	January 29, 2026
Flashbacks reveal that Sophie is the illegitimate daughter of the Earl of Penwood, and her servitude at her stepmother Araminta's hands began after the earl's death. She secretly attended the ball with the help of the cook Irma and the footman Alfie. Benedict decides to seek the lady in silver by having Penelope publicize him in her paper and engaging with debutantes. Lady Danbury and Queen Charlotte have an argument and Charlotte becomes despondent. Violet notices that the glove bears the crest of Penwood House and Benedict calls on the family. While Benedict is engaged in conversation with Posy, Alfie encourages Sophie to reveal herself, but she refuses. Benedict mentions Sophie's silver costume, cluing Araminta into Sophie's escapade. Sophie is dismissed and eventually finds new employment in the estate of an acquaintance of Benedict's. Sophie stands up to an assault in Benedict's presence, resulting in another dismissal; Benedict offers to find her a new position in London.
27	3	"The Field Next to the Other Road"	Tom Verica	Cathy Lew	January 29, 2026
Benedict and Sophie take shelter from the rain in the former's country 'cottage'. Sophie treats Benedict's wound. The next morning, the cottage's loyal keepers, the Crabtrees, insist that they stay until Benedict is healed. The two bond and kiss; Mrs. Crabtree urges Sophie to remember her place and Benedict to do right by Sophie. Meanwhile, to replace Sophie, Araminta begins poaching staff from other households, beginning "Maid Wars" in Mayfair; even Varley agrees to work for the Penwoods after Portia refuses to raise her wages. Francesca wonders about her lack of a 'pinnacle' while with John and seeks advice from Penelope, while Lady Danbury proposes that she find Queen Charlotte a new lady-in-waiting. Violet admits to Marcus that she wants to pursue a relationship with him. Benedict and Sophie return to London.
28	4	"An Offer from a Gentleman"	Jaffar Mahmood	Eli Wilson Pelton & Elizabeth Reichelt	January 29, 2026
Violet is convinced to hire Sophie as a lady's maid for Eloise and Hyacinth. The family is pleased and intrigued by Sophie's fine education and ask her to stay on permanently. Agatha successfully proposes Alice Mondrich as a new lady-in-waiting to the queen. After some investigation, Violet invites Miss Hollis, a young lady who fits the description of the Lady in Silver, to tea. Sophie spills tea on Benedict's hand, causing her to admit in private that his constant presence unsettles her. Benedict resolves to spend more time at his bachelor lodgings. John is understanding of Francesca's sexual frustration. In order to have a private night with Marcus, Violet has Francesca host a family dinner; Francesca is surprised by Michaela's sudden arrival. With the rest of the staff given the night off, Benedict and Sophie run into each other. Benedict admits his feelings for Sophie and asks her to be his mistress, but she is disquieted by the idea and leaves. Varley, now Araminta's housekeeper, welcomes Araminta and her daughters to the house next door.
Part 2
29	5	"Yes or No"	Gia-Rayne Harris	Lauren Gamble	February 26, 2026
Sophie intends to reject Benedict's offer. Hoping to work for the new Lady Penwood, Sophie asks Violet for a letter of introduction. Penelope writes about Mr. Hiscox and his mistress Virginia in her column, humiliating the latter. Conflicted about her power in the ton, Penelope asks for the queen's permission to retire, but is refused. Violet, having noticed the attraction between Benedict and Sophie, has Mrs. Wilson make inquiries. They deduce that Sophie is the illegitimate daughter of a maid, while Varley reports Sophie's employment at Bridgerton House to Araminta. A recital is held for Hyacinth and her peers, during which Gregory develops a crush and Eloise is forced to return to the marriage mart. Meanwhile, Francesca offends Michaela by trying to push a suitor; in private, the two women make amends. Benedict confesses his love to Sophie and begs her to accept his proposal. Sophie admits that she shares Benedict's feelings and the two sleep together.
30	6	"The Passing Winter"	Amy Mcıntyre	Annabelle Hood	February 26, 2026
An increasingly fatigued John is pleased to see Francesca and Michaela's blossoming friendship. After Araminta calls on her, Violet gives Sophie a letter of introduction. Benedict plans for him and Sophie to live in My Cottage away from society, despite Anthony's disapproval and Sophie's hesitation and worry that she is pregnant. Cressida, the new Lady Penwood, hosts a ball hoping to legitimize her reentry into society. With Sophie's help, Hyacinth attends alongside Eloise as a maid. Charlotte deliberately does not attend Cressida's ball, but Penelope distributes her final column as Whistledown there, sparing Cressida the embarrassment of the queen's snub being published. Charlotte finally gives Agatha permission to leave. Marcus proposes to Violet. Sophie overhears Anthony and Benedict arguing about her and ends her affair with Benedict, intending to work for Cressida. To Francesca's shock, John passes away in his sleep.
31	7	"The Beyond"	Anya Adams	Tess Leibowitz	February 26, 2026
The Bridgertons and Stirlings mourn John. Though Francesca tries to remain calm, the family is unsettled by the death ― Violet is hesitant to announce her engagement; Benedict longs to be with Sophie; Hyacinth fears her debut. Alfie informs Sophie that Cressida hired another maid, and the only other open position is for a family departing for the Americas in three days. A physical examination is conducted on Francesca, who is heartbroken to learn she is not pregnant. Having realized Benedict and Sophie's love is genuine, Violet encourages Benedict to choose carefully. Posy sneaks out to warn Sophie that Araminta means to have her arrested, convincing Sophie to leave for the Americas. However, Posy inadvertently informs Araminta of Sophie's plan. Seeking respite, Francesca agrees with Michaela's idea to host a celebration of John's life. As Sophie prepares to leave, Benedict races back to Bridgerton House to propose, having made his choice. He finds Sophie's necklace and recognizes it as the Lady in Silver's. At Araminta's behest Sophie is arrested.
32	8	"Dance in the Country"	Anya Adams	Daniel Robinson	February 26, 2026
Araminta plans to announce Rosamund's new engagement at Queen Charlotte's upcoming ball. Varley comes to Bridgerton House with news of Sophie's arrest, and the family learns of Benedict's attachment to Sophie. Violet and Benedict speak on Sophie's behalf at her trial and the magistrate agrees to release Sophie to the Bridgertons' custody. Benedict suspects that Araminta lied about the late Earl of Penwood not providing for Sophie. To prove this, Eloise visits Cressida at the renovated Penwood House to allow Sophie, Alfie and Irma to find Richard Gun’s will. Sophie learns that Araminta was paid £4000 for every year she provided for Sophie and her father left her and her stepsisters adequate and equal dowries. With Alice's help, Violet, Benedict and Sophie confront Araminta over her embezzlement. Araminta agrees to give Sophie her dowry back and to tell everyone Sophie is a legitimate cousin of the late Earl in order to avoid prison. Sophie is presented as a relative of the Guns at the ball, where she and Benedict dance as a couple for the first time publicly, and she accepts his proposal. Despite seeing through the lie, Charlotte finds the ruse amusing and accepts the match. Rosamund's proposal is rescinded due to her reduced dowry, but Posy charms a kind Lord Barnaby. Portia welcomes Varley back to her service. Violet rejects Marcus' proposal, saying she wants to rediscover herself after being a wife and mother for so long. Agatha prepares to leave London. Francesca is stunned by Michaela's sudden departure. A new Lady Whistledown begins publication. In a post-credits scene, Benedict and Sophie marry at My Cottage.

== Production ==
=== Development ===
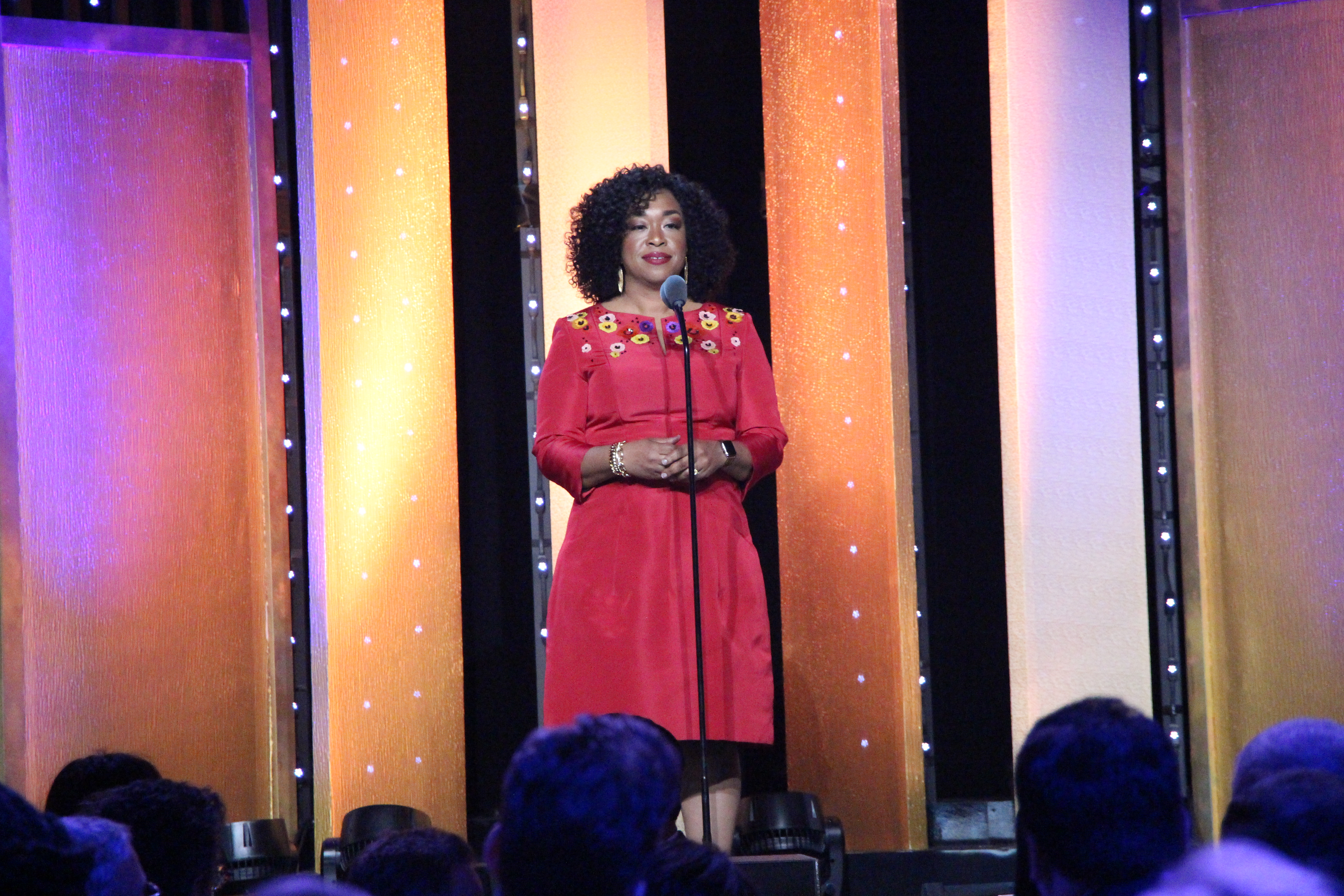
Bridgerton executive producer Shonda Rhimes

On July 20, 2018, Netflix announced that Shonda Rhimes, through her production company Shondaland, would produce the screen adaptation of the bestselling novels of the Bridgerton series by Julia Quinn, while Chris Van Dusen would serve as showrunner. Quinn explained on The Tamron Hall Show that when she heard from her agent that Rhimes was interested in adapting her novels, she "almost fell off of [her] stool," and quickly agreed to the offer. Season 1 of the show adapted The Duke and I, the first book of Quinn's series. Van Dusen said in a Shondaland article: "I think [period shows] are considered a bit traditional and conservative. With Bridgerton, I wanted to take everything I loved about a period show and turn it into something fresh, topical, and relatable."

Before the first season aired, the show was already in pre-production for a second season which was officially announced in January 2021. It is focused on Anthony and based on the book The Viscount Who Loved Me. On April 13, 2021, creator Van Dusen revealed on Twitter that the series had additionally been renewed for a third and fourth season.

Unlike the first two seasons, which followed the order of the book series, the third season focuses on Colin and Penelope, based on Quinn's fourth novel Romancing Mister Bridgerton, rather than Benedict. Jess Brownell replaced Van Dusen as writer and showrunner for the third and fourth seasons. In July 2024, it was confirmed that Benedict Bridgerton would be the lead for Season 4. In May 2025, Netflix officially announced a dual season renewal of seasons 5 and 6. On 24 March 2026, it was confirmed that Francesca Bridgerton would be the lead for Season 5, with Eloise Bridgerton the focus of Season 6.

=== Casting ===
Unlike the series of novels, Bridgerton is set in an alternate history with a racially integrated London where people of color are members of the ton, some with titles granted by the sovereign. Creator Chris Van Dusen was inspired by historical debate over the 1940s African ancestry claims of Queen Charlotte "...to base the show in an alternative history in which Queen Charlotte's mixed race heritage was not only well-established but was transformative for Black people and other people of color in England." Van Dusen says the series is not "color-blind" because "that would imply that color and race were never considered, when color and race are part of the show."

On June 19, 2019, Julie Andrews was cast as Lady Whistledown, whose voice-overs explain much of the series' action. In addition, Phoebe Dynevor and Regé-Jean Page were cast to play the leads with Jonathan Bailey, Golda Rosheuvel, Luke Newton, Claudia Jessie, Nicola Coughlan, Ruby Barker, Sabrina Bartlett, Ruth Gemmell, Adjoa Andoh and Polly Walker co-starring. Luke Thompson, Will Tilston, Florence Hunt, and Ruby Stokes were cast as the remaining four Bridgerton siblings at the end of July. Rounding out the cast were Ben Miller, Bessie Carter, Harriet Cains, Martins Imhangbe, and Lorraine Ashbourne.

On January 21, 2021, it was announced that Jonathan Bailey would be reprising his role as Anthony and would be the center of the show's sophomore season. The following month, Simone Ashley had been cast as Kate. On April 5, 2021, Charithra Chandran joined the cast as Edwina; Rupert Young joined to play a new character; Shelley Conn was cast as Kate's stepmother and Edwina's mother, Mary; and Calam Lynch was cast as Theo Sharpe. On May 28, 2021, Rupert Evans joined the cast as Edmund Bridgerton, the late patriarch of the Bridgerton family.

Page did not return for the second season despite being asked to come back as he only signed a one-year deal and wanted to explore other opportunities outside the show.

In April 2022, Bailey and Ashley were confirmed to return for the third season as Viscount and Viscountess Bridgerton, exploring their married life and duties as heads of the eponymous family. The following month, Hannah Dodd was cast to replace Ruby Stokes as Francesca Bridgerton for the third season. Stokes exited the show due to scheduling conflicts with Lockwood & Co. In August 2022, Chandran reported that she would not reprise her role as Edwina for the season. In July 2022, Daniel Francis, Sam Phillips, and James Phoon were cast in undisclosed capacities for the third season. In October 2022, Hannah New joined the cast as Lady Tilley Arnold. In January 2023, Dynevor confirmed she would not appear in the third season, but remained open to returning "in the future".

In May 2024, Coughlan and Newton were confirmed to be returning for the fourth season. In August 2024, Yerin Ha was cast as Sophie Baek (known as Sophie Beckett in the novel) while Bailey confirmed his return for the fourth season, but that he would be filming for only "a few weeks". In September 2024, Katie Leung, Isabella Wei and Michelle Mao joined as Araminta, Rosamund, and Posy, while Hugh Sachs and Emma Naomi have been upgraded to series regulars. In October 2024, Ashley confirmed that she would be returning for the season, later confirmed to be in an additional cast role as opposed to series regular in the previous two seasons. In January 2025, Dynevor revealed that she had not yet been asked to return for an appearance in the fourth season. Upon casting, Yerin Ha made a playlist on Spotify to prepare for the role which included the song “Into My Heart” (Korean: 그대가 이렇게 내 맘에) by Lee So-ra as well as songs by Benjamin Clementine and Billie Eilish.

In April 2026, Tega Alexander, Jacqueline Boatswain and Gemma Knight joined the cast of season five as Christopher Anderson, Helen Stirling and Lady Elizabeth Ashworth. In that same month, Coughlan confirmed that she would be returning to the fifth season, but that she "won't be in it very much", while Naomi and Sachs were confirmed to be returning as well. In May 2026, Julia Quinn reported that Thompson would be returning to the fifth season. In September 2026, Ashley confirmed that both she and Bailey would also be returning. As filming on the fifth season commenced, Phoebe Dynevor confirmed that she had still not received a call to return to the series.

=== Filming ===
Principal photography commenced in July 2019 and wrapped in late February 2020. Bridgerton was filmed in London and Bath, as well as at various estates and parks around England. Although the series takes place in London, most street scenes were filmed in Bath, York, and Chatham. The grounds of Wilton House were used for Hyde Park and the grounds of Somerley were used for Hampstead Heath. Garden scenes were filmed at Painshill near Cobham and the Commissioner's House in Chatham.

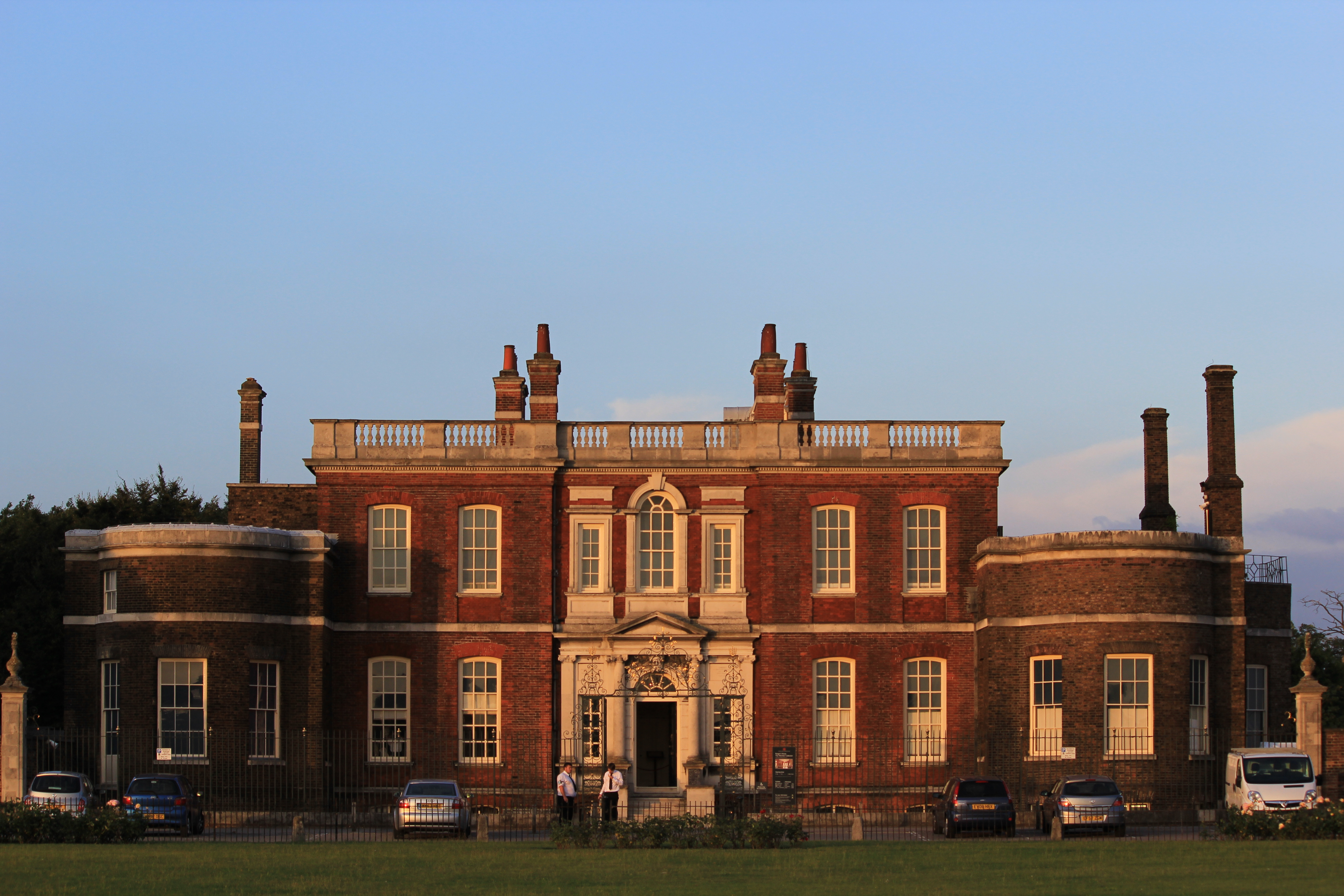
Ranger's House is used as the exterior of the Bridgerton family's house in London

Filming locations included Ranger's House in Greenwich (standing in for the Bridgerton House in London exterior); Halton House at RAF Halton (Bridgerton House interior, Featheringtons' interior); Wilton House (Simon's Hastings House, Clyvedon estate interior, St James's Palace throne room); Syon House and Badminton House (Hastings House); Castle Howard (Clyvedon estate); Coneysthorpe (Clyvedon village); Hampton Court Palace and Lancaster House (St. James's Palace); Holburne Museum (Lady Danbury's estate); Hatfield House (Featheringtons' interior); No. 1 Royal Crescent (Grosvenor Square); Queen's House and Somerley (Somerset House); and Dorney Court (coaching inn).

Vauxhall Pleasure Gardens no longer exists in its entirety. The production team recreated it for Lady Danbury's ball by combining the remaining parts with Castle Howard and Stowe Park. The banqueting room at the Guildhall, Bath was used for another ball as well as the Great Hall at Leigh Court in Somerset.

Anthony Bridgerton and Simon Basset meet in the real-life Reform Club on Pall Mall in central London. The scene in which Lady Featherington takes Marina to the slums was filmed at Chatham Dockyard in Kent. Boxing scenes were also filmed here in addition to Normansfield Theatre in Teddington. Theatre scenes were filmed at the Hackney Empire. A café in Bath, Pickled Greens, was used as the site of the Modiste shop and the Bathrooms at No.5 store on Trim Street became the site of Gunter's Tea Shop.

The costuming was led by Ellen Mirojnick and involved over two hundred people and five months of preparation to create 5,000 costumes.

Production on the second season began in March 2021. In May 2021, it was reported that the Royal Borough of Windsor and Maidenhead refused permission to build a film set for the second season in Sunninghill Park near Windsor, despite royal approval. On July 15, 2021, production on the second season was paused for 24 hours when a crew member tested positive for COVID-19, but resumed the following day. However, on July 17, production was halted indefinitely following a second positive test. Production resumed in August 2021. Production for the second season wrapped on November 20, 2021.

New filming locations for season 2 included Wrotham Park (standing in for the Bridgertons' country home Aubrey Hall); West Wycombe Park (Aubrey Hall interior and the Crane estate); Wrest Park, Ivinghoe Beacon, and Ashridge (the Orangery and Aubrey Hall grounds); the Royal County of Berkshire Polo Club (Royal Ascot); Old Royal Naval College; Windsor Great Park (woods scenes); Goldsmiths' Hall (Buckingham palace throne room); and Wilton's Music Hall (feminist meeting place). The real St James's Church is in the series. The art display at Petworth House was used for the museum scene, with Royal Artillery Barracks used as the exterior. The finale ball was filmed at Basildon Park.

The third season began principal photography in July 2022 and wrapped in March 2023.

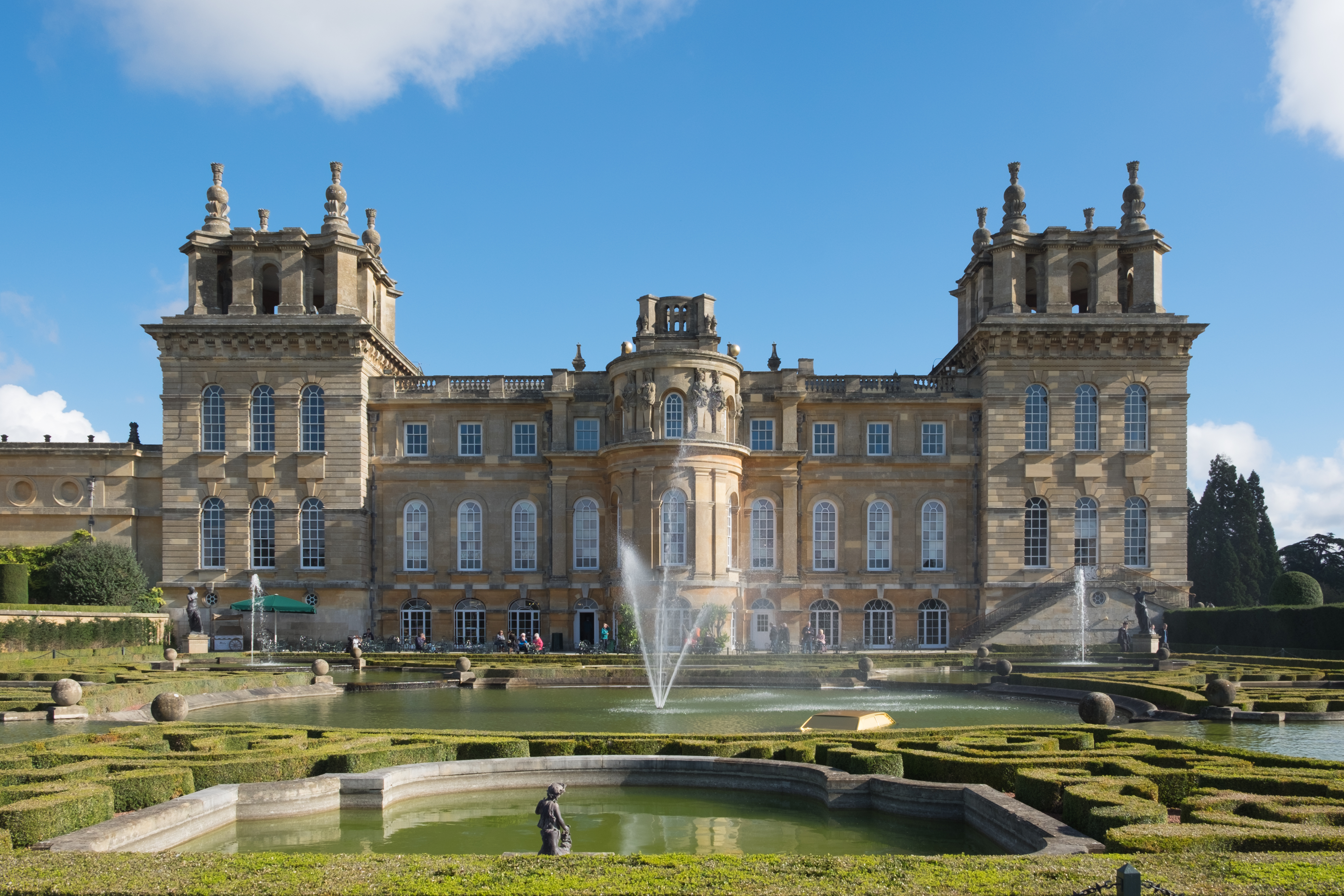
Blenheim Palace, used as a filming location for the series

New filming locations for Bridgerton in season 3 included Claydon House, Squerryes Court (garden party scenes), Osterley Park (Full Moon Ball), Grimsthorpe Castle (Hawkins residence), Basildon Park (Arnold residence), Blenheim Palace (standing in for Buckingham House) and Woburn Walk (Modiste dress shop) in London.

The fourth season began principal photography on September 16, 2024 and wrapped by June 20, 2025. Supervising locations manager Tony Hood underwent an "exhaustive search" for Benedict's second home (called My Cottage) and landed on Loseley Park. Another new location was Ham House (Crabtree's domain). During production of season 4, Yerin Ha got irritant contact dermatitis all over her body from personally applying baby powder all over her body before performing a scene in a bath tub for five hours.

Production on season five began in March 24, 2026, with Hannah Dodd and Masali Baduza confirmed as the leads and Netflix officially confirmed filming had wrapped on October 27, 2026.

=== Music ===
American composer and pianist Kris Bowers composed and arranged the score for the series. Bowers wrote and composed the first season's soundtrack, featuring nineteen songs. Musicians recorded the score remotely from their home studios during the COVID-19 pandemic.

The first season featured orchestral covers of contemporary popular music, which director and executive producer Julie Anne Robinson said was inspired by the use of classic rock songs in the 2001 film A Knight's Tale. Songs featured included Ariana Grande's "Thank U, Next", Maroon 5's "Girls Like You", Shawn Mendes's "In My Blood" and Billie Eilish's "Bad Guy", all four of which are performed by Vitamin String Quartet. Also included are Celeste's "Strange" performed by Bowers, and Taylor Swift's "Wildest Dreams" performed by Duomo. Bowers also included modern interpretations of classical music, such as Bach's Cello Suite No. 6 in D major from Peter Gregson's Recomposed by Peter Gregson: Bach – The Cello Suites and Vivaldi's The Four Seasons from Max Richter's Recomposed by Max Richter: Vivaldi – The Four Seasons. The first season also included JPOLND's "The End" which has a "swingy melody but intense lyrics."

In the second season, covers include Nirvana's "Stay Away" and Robyn's "Dancing On My Own" by Vitamin String Quartet, Madonna's "Material Girl", "Kabhi Khushi Kabhie Gham" from the soundtrack of the film of the same name and Calvin Harris' "How Deep Is Your Love" by Bowers. Also included are Alanis Morissette's "You Oughta Know" and Pink's "What About Us" by Duomo, Harry Styles' "Sign of the Times" by Steve Horner, Rihanna's "Diamonds" by Hannah V and Joe Rodwell and Miley Cyrus' "Wrecking Ball" by Midnight String Quartet. To promote the show, Morisette appeared in a video performing "You Oughta Know" with Duomo. When discussing the music of season two, music supervisor Justin Kramps explained that "even for these songs that are just huge songs that everyone knows, [an instrumental version] still breathes new life and brings them to a new audience, and in a different way. Pop is where we start, because it fits the style of the show, and it's often using these super-recognizable songs that just add a lot of joy, which is what pop does in general."

In the third season, covers include Gayle's "ABCDEFU" by Vitula, BTS' "Dynamite", Sia's "Cheap Thrills", Billie Eilish's "Happier Than Ever", and Coldplay's "Yellow" by Vitamin String Quartet, Nick Jonas' "Jealous", by Shimmer, Taylor Swift's "Snow on the Beach" by Atwood Quartet, Pitbull's "Give Me Everything", Demi Lovato's "Confident", and Ellie Goulding's "Lights (Stripped Down)" by Archer Marsh, Ariana Grande's "POV" by Strings from Paris, Imagine Dragons' "Thunder" by Thomas Mercier, and Taylor Swift's "You Belong with Me" by Duomo.

During the part 1 premiere in New York City, Tori Kelly performed the first original Bridgerton song, "All I Want", which played over the credits in the eighth episode. The cover of "Give Me Everything" went viral on social media.

== Release ==
The eight episodes of the first season of Bridgerton began streaming on Netflix on December 25, 2020. The second season's eight episodes were released on March 25, 2022. The first part of the third season premiered on May 16, 2024, with the first four episodes, while the second part premiered on June 13, 2024, with the last four episodes. The fourth season was again released in two parts, premiering on January 29 and February 26, 2026, respectively.

=== Marketing ===
A preview of a scene from season 2 aired during Netflix's September 2021 Tudum: Extended Talent Panel, which was followed by first look stills. On February 14, 2022, the first teaser trailer for the second season was released. A world premiere was held at Tate Modern on March 22, 2022, in London, England prior to the season's eight episodes being released. Due to a three-month commitment as the lead in the acclaimed West End play Cock, Jonathan Bailey had missed "press, talk shows, FYC events, and even the Met Gala" as part of the show's promotion.

In December 2023, it was announced that the third season would be split into two parts. At a Valentine's Day Event on February 14, 2024, the season's episode titles, exclusive photos and first look footage were released alongside a panel attended by Rhimes, Brownell, Quinn, and cast members: Coughlan, Newton, Rosheuvel, Andoh, Jessie, Thompson, and Imhangbe. The trailer for season 3 part 1 was released on April 11, 2024. A world premiere was held in New York City prior to the premiere of part 1 of Season 3. A world premiere was held in London's Leicester Square prior to the premiere of part 2 of Season 3.

== Reception ==
=== Critical response ===
Critical response of Bridgerton
Season	Rotten Tomatoes	Metacritic
1	87% (100 reviews)	75 (34 reviews)
2	78% (95 reviews)	70 (32 reviews)
3	87% (79 reviews)	69 (26 reviews)
4	82% (62 reviews)	65 (23 reviews)

The series has received an average score of 83% on the review aggregator website Rotten Tomatoes and a score of 71 on Metacritic.

==== Season 1 ====
The first season received positive reviews. On the review aggregator website Rotten Tomatoes 87% 100 reviews are positive, with an average rating of 7.7/10. The website's critics consensus reads, "Sumptuous design, soapy drama, and a sterling cast make Bridgerton a delightful treat." Metacritic gave the series a weighted average score of 75 out of 100 based on 34 reviews, indicating "generally favorable" reviews.

Kristen Baldwin of Entertainment Weekly gave the series a B+ and wrote, "Bridgerton, it seems, is a wonderful diversion for those who love Pride & Prejudice but wish it had more stairway sex." Richard Roeper of Chicago Sun-Times gave the series four out of four stars and called it "A show that will give you that unmistakable binge twinge and have you activating that 'Next Episode" time and again, until there are no more 'Next Episodes'." British GQ described Bridgerton as a cross between Downton Abbey and Gossip Girl, but noted that it "may just end up being another disappointment" and "it could have been brilliant". Salamishah Tillet of The New York Times said "Bridgerton provides a blueprint for British period shows in which Black characters can thrive within the melodramatic story lines, extravagant costumes and bucolic beauty [...] without having to be servants or enslaved." Erum Salam of Cosmopolitan wrote "I kept wanting more. I wanted more explanations of how race factored into this society..." Carolyn Hinds from Observer stated "Bridgerton has been praised as a racially diverse show set in the Regency era, because having Black people in a big budget production period show—or film—about England before the 1900s feels like a foreign concept for white directors and writers, even though Black, South Asian, Asian and other people of color had been living there for hundreds of years as a result of mercantilism, and the monarchy’s colonization of over half the world." Vanity Fair's Caroline Framke describes the sex in the series "isn't altogether shocking material for Shondaland to mine for its first drama series absent broadcast restraints."

The first season's 6th episode drew criticism with regard to the non-consensual nature of a sex scene between Simon and Daphne, which amounted to marital rape. The episode depicts Daphne, while having sex with Simon, changing her position to be on top, preventing Simon from pulling out of her when he climaxes despite his objections, to prove he could impregnate her but chooses not to. Described as one of the toxic plot points of their relationship, it further drew scrutiny due to the fact that the deceit was never addressed as sexual assault in the series. Critics pointed out that it failed to acknowledge the difficulties of male victims of rape and the further fetishization of black men in media.

==== Season 2 ====
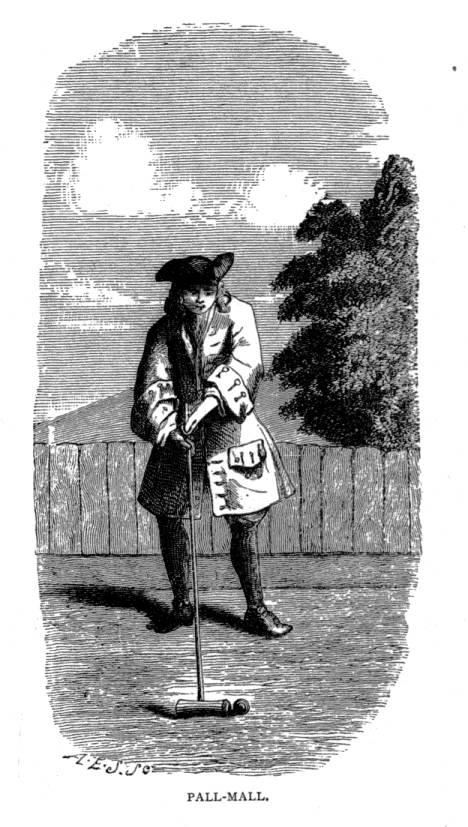
Pall-mall features as a pastime for the Bridgerton siblings in the second season

The second season received positive reviews. On Rotten Tomatoes, 78% of 95 critic reviews are positive with an average rating of 7.1/10. The website's critics consensus states, "The risqué thrill may have faded, but Bridgerton remains a compulsive episode-turner in this delightful sophomore season." Metacritic gave the series a weighted average score of 70 out of 100 based on 32 reviews, indicating "generally favorable" reviews.

Kristen Baldwin of Entertainment Weekly gave the series an A−, writing, "With a second season that's more clever, moving, and emotionally complex than the first, this period drama ... proves that it's not just a titillating trifle." The Hollywood Reporter's Angie Hahn echoed the sentiment, describing the season as "older and wiser" than its predecessor's "rampant horniness", with an effective central romance that prioritized "a meeting of minds, played out over quick-witted arguments outside ballrooms and vicious competition during a friendly family game of pall-mall". Peter Travers of ABC News praised the season writing, "Kudos to season two for digging deeper into the emotional lives of its characters and continuing the colorblind casting that creates a utopia in which diversity is so ingrained it's hardly worth a mention."

Alison Herman of The Ringer commented that Season 1 is "sexy without quite being erotic" while "Season 2 is the reverse. There's not a lot of sex, but in the crackling chemistry and relentless self-denial that defines Anthony and Kate's dynamic, there's plenty of eroticism." Emma Clarke of The Independent argued that, "it is precisely the lack of physicality that makes this season (of the show and of courtship) so... well, sexy." Scott Bryan of the BBC wrote that the season serves as an antidote to the "always static, laboured and slow" period dramas, adding that it comes with "real energy, it feels so modern (even though it is set in the past) and even though it feels extravagant, it doesn't feel too highbrow. It is refreshingly accessible."

Kevin Fallon of The Daily Beast, elaborating on Bailey's "exquisite lead performance", wrote that "he has an exceptional ability to carry his angst, pain, and guilt with him without bogging down things into a somber drag." The Telegraph's Anita Singh wrote that Bailey "brings more soul to the role of Lord Bridgerton than Page ever did with the Duke", with Randy Myers of Mercury News adding that Bailey "has a gift at comedic timing". Proma Khosla of Mashable concluded that with "Bailey and Ashley, Bridgerton Season 2 strikes gold" as they deliver "heaping, smoldering helpings of sexual tension" for "their chemistry is nothing short of explosive".

==== Season 3 ====
The third season received positive reviews. On Rotten Tomatoes, 87% of 79 critic reviews are positive, with an average rating of 7.0/10. The website's critics consensus states, "The hot goss in London remains juicy as ever in Bridgerton's third season, which benefits tremendously from Nicola Coughlan and Luke Newton's endearing chemistry." Metacritic gave the series a weighted average score of 69 out of 100 based on 26 reviews, indicating "generally favorable" reviews.

Aramide Tinubu of Variety praised Coughlan and Newton's chemistry, noting that while they have always had a "beautiful rapport", "there is something about seeing the bond between Colin and Penelope transform from comfortably platonic to yearning and passionate that elevates this journey." Tinubu also found part 2 of Season 3 "as a gem in the franchise". David Opie of Empire praised part 2's mirror scene as "the most beautiful sex scene this show has ever depicted" and featuring "some of the finest acting seen in Bridgerton yet". Further, Opie found that "Season 3 ends with the show's strongest episodes yet" and that Bridgerton has cemented itself as "the rare Netflix success story that's just as well made as it is widely watched". Rachel Aroesti of The Guardian credited Bridgerton Season 3 of benefiting from having two seasons under its belt in portraying the most "captivating courtship yet", and praised the dynamic between Colin and Penelope, partly attributing it to Coughlan's "sensational" acting. Alyssa Mora of IGN describes Coughlan and Newton's chemistry as "undeniable", and Coughlan's talent as "manag[ing] to take center stage".

Katie Rosseinsky of The Independent called Coughlan "the true diamond of the season", and praised her powerhouse performance alongside Jessie. Carly Lane of Collider also called Coughlan the "true diamond" of the season. Judy Berman of Time praised Coughlan's Penelope as the "series’ most compelling protagonist to date", and Coughlan for the "vividness and sensitivity" in which she portrayed Penelope's transformation. Kelly Lawler of USA Today found that Season 3 made Coughlan "a bona fide star". Keisha Hatchett of TVLine had praise for both leads, naming Nicola Coughlan and Luke Newton "Performers of the Week" after part 2 of Season 3. Of the season 3 finale, she noted that Newton "beautifully captured" Colin's "flurry of emotions" "with smart choices" and praised Newton's delivery of Colin's final love declaration of the season as "exuding the irresistible charm we’ve come to love about our male Bridgerton leads". Angie Han of The Hollywood Reporter noted that "while the latest chapter faithfully delivers on everything we’ve come to expect from this world [...] it's also the first in which the formula feels more familiar than thrilling." Kathryn VanArendonk of Vulture noted that Season 3 continued an issue in previous seasons of "not [being able to] live up to the complexities of its own emotional stakes in the back half", but that "Bridgerton remains too much fun to consider breaking up with anytime soon." Lauren Sarner of The New York Post also found that the show "remains addictively watchable".

News publications, charities, disabled influencers and fans picked up on the incidental disability portrayal in the first half of Season 3.

==== Season 4 ====
The fourth season received positive reviews. On Rotten Tomatoes, 81% of 58 critics' reviews are positive. The website's critics consensus states, "Taking a page out of a fairytale, Bridgerton season four excels at selling a fantasy that, no matter how predictable, is as sweet, steamy, and engrossing as ever." Metacritic gave the season a weighted average score of 65 out of 100 based on 23 critics, indicating "generally favorable" reviews.

=== Audience viewership ===
==== Season 1 ====
On January 27, 2021, Netflix announced that 82 million households had watched at least two minutes of the first season, amounting to 625 million hours viewed. It was the most-watched original series launch on the service at the time of its premiere, prior to being surpassed by Squid Game in October 2021. Caroline Framke of Variety attributed this huge viewership to "the perfect storm of a perfectly timed premiere (Christmas Day of 2020), providing silly and sexy entertainment after the first terrible year of COVID".

==== Season 2 ====
Season 2 premiered on March 25, 2022, and debuted number one in 92 countries on the platform. It was also the most viewed show on United States television screens for three weeks per Nielsen Media Research. Season 2 amassed 193 million viewing hours in its opening weekend, the highest opening for any English-language Netflix series at the time. It also broke the record for most viewed English-language series in a single week at that time, with 251.74 million viewing hours from March 28 to April 3. The first season also re-entered Netflix's top ten in second place. By April 19, Bridgerton's second season had overtaken its predecessor as the most watched English-language television series on Netflix at the time with 627.11 million hours viewed since its March 25, 2022, launch. This viewing numbers went up to 656.16 million by the 28-day mark.

Nielsen Media Research, analyzing the 2.55 billion minutes viewed on United States television screens in the first three days of season 2's availability (double all others across streamers for the week of March 21), characterized Bridgerton's audience as "diverse and broad". The firm found one third of viewers to be Hispanic or African American and an even split in popularity across the 18–34, 35–49, and 50–64 age groups at 25% each. The only exception was gender parity, with 76% of the audience reported to be female. It added 3.2 billion minutes viewed in its second week on top of the chart. It topped the chart for a third week with 1.6 billion minutes viewed.

==== Season 3 ====
In 2023, between seasons 2 and 3, Netflix rolled out a new, different method of counting viewership, which is to divide the number of hours watched by a show's runtime. The platform also expanded the measurement window from 28 days to 91 days. Under this new method of measurement, season 3 part 1, which had 220 minutes of runtime, received 45.05 million views in its first week, and then 25.3 million views in its second week, 11.6 million in its third, and 6.9 million in its fourth. After season 3 part 2 debuted (based on 480 minutes of runtime), the overall season received 28 million views that debut week, 16.5 million views the following week, 6.6 million views the third week, and 4 million the fourth.

Season 3 part 1 recorded the show's biggest opening weekend to date with 165.2 million views (on 220 minutes of runtime). At the time, Season 3 also recorded the highest single weekly view count for any Netflix series, regardless of language, since Netflix started the list in June 2023. On July 2, 2024, Season 3 became Netflix's tenth biggest English-language series ever with 91.9 million views so far. As of January 1, 2025, Season 3 was sixth in Netflix's top-10 all-time list, for any language, with 846.5 million hours viewed/106 million views.

Season 3 became the second most watched series on Netflix during the first half of 2024, with 92 million views. Season 3 has the second-highest viewing figures for streaming in 2024, with 11 billion minutes of watch time. According to Nielsen, Bridgerton was the most-streamed original series of 2024 with 21.42 billion minutes viewed, with Season 3 accounting for 56% of those views.

==== Season 4 ====
Season 4 is the first installment in the franchise not to reach Netflix's all-time Top 10 most-watched shows within the platform's 91-day measurement window. Season 4 is estimated to have finished with 92–95 million views.

=== Accolades ===
Year	Award	Category	Nominees	Result	Ref.
2021	AFI Awards	Top Television Program	Bridgerton	Won	
2021	Black Reel Awards	Outstanding Actor, Drama Series	Regé-Jean Page	Nominated	
2021	Black Reel Awards	Outstanding Supporting Actress, Drama Series	Adjoa Andoh	Won	
2021	British Academy Television Awards	Virgin TV's Must-See Moment	"Penelope is revealed as Lady Whistledown"	Nominated	
2021	Costume Designers Guild Awards	Excellence in Period Television	Ellen Mirojnick and John Glaser (for "Diamond of the First Water")	Nominated	
2021	Directors Guild of America Awards	Outstanding Directorial Achievement in Dramatic Series	Julie Anne Robinson (for "Diamond of the First Water")	Nominated	
2021	Gold Derby Awards	Drama Supporting Actor	Jonathan Bailey	Nominated	
2021	Golden Reel Awards	Outstanding Achievement in Sound Editing – Music Score and Musical for Episodic Long Form Broadcast Media	Brittany DuBay (for "Shock and Delight")	Nominated	
2021	Hollywood Critics Association TV Awards	Best Streaming Series, Drama	Bridgerton	Nominated	
2021	Hollywood Critics Association TV Awards	Best Actor in a Streaming Series, Drama	Regé-Jean Page	Nominated	
2021	Hollywood Music in Media Awards	Best Original Score in a TV Show/Limited Series	Kris Bowers	Nominated	
2021	Make-Up Artists and Hair Stylists Guild Awards	Best Television Series, Limited or Miniseries or New Media Series – Best Period and/or Character Make-Up	Marc Pilcher, Lynda J. Pearce, Claire Matthews, and Louise Bannell	Nominated	
2021	Make-Up Artists and Hair Stylists Guild Awards	Best Television Series, Limited or Miniseries or New Media Series – Best Period and/or Character Hair Styling	Marc Pilcher, Lynda J. Pearce, Adam James Phillips, and Tania Couper	Won	
2021	MTV Movie & TV Awards	Best Show	Bridgerton	Nominated	
2021	MTV Movie & TV Awards	Best Breakthrough Performance	Regé-Jean Page	Won	
2021	MTV Movie & TV Awards	Best Kiss	Regé-Jean Page and Phoebe Dynevor	Nominated	
2021	NAACP Image Awards	Outstanding Drama Series	Bridgerton	Nominated	
2021	NAACP Image Awards	Outstanding Actor in a Drama Series	Regé-Jean Page	Won	
2021	NAACP Image Awards	Outstanding Supporting Actress in a Drama Series	Adjoa Andoh	Nominated	
2021	Primetime Emmy Awards	Outstanding Drama Series	Chris Van Dusen, Shonda Rhimes, Betsy Beers, Scott Collins, Alison Eakle, Sara Fischer, Julia Quinn, Leila Cohan-Miccio, Jonathan Igla, Janet Lin, Holden Chang, Sarah Dollard, and Sarada McDermott	Nominated	
2021	Primetime Emmy Awards	Outstanding Lead Actor in a Drama Series	Regé-Jean Page (for "Art of the Swoon")	Nominated	
2021	Primetime Emmy Awards	Outstanding Directing for a Drama Series	Julie Anne Robinson (for "Diamond of the First Water")	Nominated	
2021	Primetime Creative Arts Emmy Awards	Outstanding Character Voice-Over Performance	Julie Andrews (for "Diamond Of The First Water")	Nominated	
2021	Primetime Creative Arts Emmy Awards	Outstanding Casting for a Drama Series	Kelly Valentine Hendry	Nominated	
2021	Primetime Creative Arts Emmy Awards	Outstanding Cinematography for a Single-Camera Series (One Hour)	Jeffrey Jur (for "Art of the Swoon")	Nominated	
2021	Primetime Creative Arts Emmy Awards	Outstanding Period Costumes	Ellen Mirojnick, John Glaser, Sanaz Missaghian, and Kenny Crouch (for "Diamond of the First Water")	Nominated	
2021	Primetime Creative Arts Emmy Awards	Outstanding Period and/or Character Hairstyling	Marc Pilcher, Lynda J. Pearce, Claire Matthews, Adam James Phillips, Tania Couper, and Lou Bannell (for "Art of the Swoon")	Won	
2021	Primetime Creative Arts Emmy Awards	Outstanding Music Composition for a Series (Original Dramatic Score)	Kris Bowers (for "Diamond Of The First Water")	Nominated	
2021	Primetime Creative Arts Emmy Awards	Outstanding Original Main Title Theme Music	Kris Bowers and Michael Dean Parsons	Nominated	
2021	Primetime Creative Arts Emmy Awards	Outstanding Music Supervision	Alexandra Patsavas (for "Diamond Of The First Water")	Nominated	
2021	Primetime Creative Arts Emmy Awards	Outstanding Production Design for a Narrative Period or Fantasy Program (One Hour or More)	Will Hughes-Jones, Dominic Devine, and Gina Cromwell (for "After the Rain")	Nominated	
2021	Producers Guild of America Awards	Norman Felton Award for Outstanding Producer of Episodic Television – Drama	Chris Van Dusen, Shonda Rhimes, Betsy Beers, Scott Collins, Alison Eakle, Sara Fischer, Sarada McDermott, Holden Chang, and Tom Verica	Nominated	
2021	Satellite Awards	Best Actor in a Drama Series	Regé-Jean Page	Nominated	
2021	Satellite Awards	Best Actress in a Drama Series	Phoebe Dynevor	Nominated	
2021	Screen Actors Guild Awards	Outstanding Performance by an Ensemble in a Drama Series	Cast of Bridgerton	Nominated	
2021	Screen Actors Guild Awards	Outstanding Performance by a Male Actor in a Drama Series	Regé-Jean Page	Nominated	
2021	Television Critics Association Awards	Program of the Year	Bridgerton	Nominated	
2021	Television Critics Association Awards	Outstanding Achievement in Drama	Bridgerton	Nominated	
2021	Television Critics Association Awards	Outstanding New Program	Bridgerton	Nominated	
2021	Rose d'Or	Drama	Bridgerton	Nominated	
2021	ReFrame Stamp	IMDbPro Top 200 Most Popular TV Titles 2020-2021 (Gender-Balanced Production certification)	Bridgerton	Won	
2022	Black Reel Awards	Outstanding Directing, Drama Series	Cheryl Dunye (for "The Viscount Who Loved Me")	Won	
2022	Black Reel Awards	Outstanding Supporting Actress, Drama Series	Adjoa Andoh	Nominated	
2022	Black Reel Awards	Outstanding Music Supervision	Alexandra Pastvas	Nominated	
2022	Black Reel Awards	Outstanding Musical Score	Kris Bowers	Nominated	
2022	Grammy Awards	Best Score Soundtrack for Visual Media	Kris Bowers	Nominated	
2022	Hollywood Critics Association TV Awards	Best Actress in a Streaming Series, Drama	Simone Ashley	Nominated	
2022	MTV Movie & TV Awards	Best Musical Moment	Anthony and Kate dancing to Midnight String Quartet's cover of "Wrecking Ball"	Nominated	
2022	National Television Awards	Best Returning Drama	Bridgerton S2	Nominated	
2022	National Television Awards	Best Performance in a Drama	Simone Ashley	Nominated	
2022	National Television Awards	Best Performance in a Drama	Jonathan Bailey	Nominated	
2022	National Television Awards	Rising Star	Charithra Chandran	Nominated	
2022	Primetime Creative Arts Emmy Awards	Outstanding Character Voice-Over Performance	Julie Andrews (for "Capital R Rake")	Nominated	
2022	Primetime Creative Arts Emmy Awards	Outstanding Period Costumes	Sophie Canale, Dougie Hawkes, Sarah June Mills, Charlotte Armstrong, Sanaz Missaghian, and Kevin Pratten-Stone (for "Harmony")	Nominated	
2022	Primetime Creative Arts Emmy Awards	Outstanding Period and/or Character Hairstyling	Erika Okvist, Jenny Rhodes-McLean, and Sim Camps (for "The Viscount Who Loved Me")	Won	
2022	Set Decorators Society of America Awards	Best Achievement in Décor/Design of a One Hour Period Series	Gina Cromwell and Will Hughes-Jones	Nominated	
2022	TV Choice Awards	Best Drama Series	Bridgerton S2	Won	
2022	TV Choice Awards	Best Actress Drama	Simone Ashley	Nominated	
2022	TV Choice Awards	Best Actor Drama	Jonathan Bailey	Nominated	
2022	The Casting Directors' Guild Awards	Best Casting in a Television Drama	Kelly Valentine Hendry (Casting Director) and Cole Edwards (Casting Associate)	Won	
2022	People Choice Awards	The Bingeworthy Show of 2022	Bridgerton S2	Nominated	
2022	Production Music Association Mark Awards	Best Use in Scripted TV Series	Nathalie Bonin (composer) for “The Viscount Who Loved Me”	Nominated	
2022	Digital Spy Reader Awards	Best Actor	Jonathan Bailey	Won	
2022	Digital Spy Reader Awards	Best British Drama	Bridgerton S2	Won	
2022	Online Film & Television Association	Best Makeup - Period and/or Character	Bridgerton S2	Nominated	
2022	Online Film & Television Association	Best Costume Design - Period	Bridgerton S2	Nominated	
2022	Online Film & Television Association	Best Production Design - Period	Bridgerton S2	Nominated	
2022	Online Film & Television Association	Best Voice-Over Performance	Julie Andrews	Nominated	
2022	Location Managers Guild International Awards (LMGI)	Outstanding Locations in a Period Television Series	Tony Hood	Nominated	
2022	Music + Sound Awards, International	Television Programme (Single Scene)	Sean Harrison (arranger), Steve Horner and Justin Kamps (music supervisor) for "Sign Of The Times"	Nominated	
2022	ReFrame Stamp	IMDbPro Top 200 Most Popular TV Titles 2021-2022 (Gender-Balanced Production certification)	Bridgerton S2	Won	
2023	NAACP Image Awards	Outstanding Drama Series	Bridgerton S2	Nominated	
2023	NAACP Image Awards	Outstanding Supporting Actress in a Drama Series	Adjoa Andoh	Nominated	
2023	NAACP Image Awards	Outstanding Soundtrack/Compilation Album	Bridgerton Season Two (Soundtrack from the Netflix Series) (by Kris Bowers)	Nominated	
2023	Make-Up Artists & Hair Stylists Guild Awards	Best Period and/or Character Hair Styling - Television Series, Limited Series or Miniseries, or Movie for Television	Erika Ökvist, Emma Rigby, Farida Ghwedar, and Lara Prentice	Nominated	
2023	Make-Up Artists & Hair Stylists Guild Awards	Best Period and/or Character Makeup - Television Series, Limited Series or Miniseries, or Movie for Television	Erika Ökvist, Jessie Deol, Sophie Brown, and Bethany Long	Nominated	
2023	Costume Designers Guild Awards	Excellence in Period Television	Sophie Canale "The Choice"	Nominated	
2023	Guild of Music Supervisors Awards	Best Music Supervision for Television Drama	Justin Kamps	Nominated	
2024	National Television Awards	Returning Drama	Bridgerton	Won	
2024	Costume Designers Guild Awards	Excellence in Period Television	John Glaser "Romancing Mister Bridgerton"	Nominated	
2024	Location Managers Guild International Awards (LMGI)	Outstanding Locations in a Period Television Series	Tony Hood	Nominated	
2024	TV Times Awards	Favourite Returning Drama	Bridgerton	Won	
2024	Dorian TV Awards	Campiest TV Show	Bridgerton	Nominated	
2024	Digital Spy Reader Awards	Best Actor	Nicola Coughlan	Won	
2024	Digital Spy Reader Awards	Best TV Show (scripted)	Bridgerton	Won	
2024	Digital Spy Reader Awards	Best TV Character	Penelope Featherington	Won	
2025	Screen Actors Guild Awards	Outstanding Performance by a Female Actor in a Drama Series	Nicola Coughlan	Nominated	
2025	Screen Actors Guild Awards	Outstanding Performance by an Ensemble in a Drama Series	Geraldine Alexander, Victor Alli, Adjoa Andoh, Julie Andrews, Lorraine Ashbourne, Simone Ashley, Jonathan Bailey, Joe Barnes, Joanna Bobin, James Bryan, Harriet Cains, Bessie Carter, Genevieve Chenneour, Dominic Coleman, Nicola Coughlan, Kitty Devlin, Hannah Dodd, Daniel Francis, Ruth Gemmell, Rosa Hesmondhalgh, Sesley Hope, Florence Hunt, Martins Imhangbe, Molly Jackson-Shaw, Claudia Jessie, Lorn Macdonald, Jessica Madsen, Emma Naomi, Hannah New, Luke Newton, Caleb Obediah, James Phoon, Vineeta Rishi, Golda Rosheuvel, Hugh Sachs, Banita Sandhu, Luke Thompson, Will Tilston, Polly Walker, Anna Wilson-Jones, and Sophie Woolley	Nominated	
2025	NAACP Image Awards	Outstanding Supporting Actress in a Dramatic Series	Adjoa Andoh	Nominated	
2025	NAACP Image Awards	Outstanding Supporting Actress in a Dramatic Series	Golda Rosheuvel	Nominated	
2025	NAACP Image Awards	Outstanding Writing in a Dramatic Series	Geetika Lizardi (for "Joining of Hands")	Nominated	
2025	NAACP Image Awards	Outstanding Writing in a Dramatic Series	Azia Squire (for "Tick Tock")	Nominated	
2025	NAACP Image Awards	Outstanding Writing in a Dramatic Series	Lauren Gamble (for "Old Friends")	Nominated	
2025	Hollywood Makeup Artist and Hair Stylist Guild Awards	Best Period and/or Character Makeup – Television Series, Limited Series or Miniseries, or Movie for Television	Erika Ökvist, Bethany Long, Jessie Deol	Nominated	
2025	Hollywood Makeup Artist and Hair Stylist Guild Awards	Best Period and/or Character Hair Styling – Television Series, Limited Series or Miniseries, or Movie for Television	Erika Ökvist, Farida Ghwedar, Emma Rigby	Won	
2025	TV Choice Awards UK	Best Drama Performance	Nicola Coughlan	Nominated	
2025	TV Choice Awards UK	Best Drama Performance	Luke Newton	Nominated	
2025	Art Directors Guild Awards	One-Hour Period Single-Camera Series	Alison Gartshore "Old Friends", "Romancing Mister Bridgerton", "Into the Light"	Nominated	
2025	British Academy Television Awards	P&O Cruises Memorable Moment	“THE” carriage scene where Colin admits his true feelings for Penelope	Nominated	
2025	Global Production Awards	Sustainable Production Award (TV)	Bridgerton	Nominated	
2025	The Astra Awards	Best Actress in a Drama Series	Nicola Coughlan	Nominated	
2025	The Astra Awards	Best Cast Ensemble in Streaming Drama Series	Bridgerton	Nominated	
2025	Edinburgh TV Awards	TV Moment of the Year 2025	THE Carriage Scene Bridgerton- Shondaland, Netflix	Won	
2025	Primetime Creative Arts Emmy Awards	Outstanding Period Costumes	John Glaser, Amanda McLaughlan, Dougie Hawkes, George Sayer, Anthony Brookman (for "Into The Light ")	Won	
2025	Primetime Creative Arts Emmy Awards	Outstanding Period or Fantasy/Sci-Fi Hairstyling	Erika Okvist, Farida Ghwedar, Grace Stella Gorman, Laura Sim (for "Old Friends")	Won	
2025	Primetime Creative Arts Emmy Awards	Outstanding Production Design for a Narrative Period or Fantasy Program (One Hour or More)	Alison Gartshore, Natalie Papageorgiadis, Antony Cartlidge (for "Romancing Mister Bridgerton")	Nominated	
2025	Primetime Creative Arts Emmy Awards	Outstanding Choreography for Scripted Programming	Sean "Jack" Murphy (for "Butterfly Ball" / "Eros and Psyche" / "Jealousy" / "Wedding Dance" / "Rejoining the Ton"")	Nominated	
2025	Primetime Creative Arts Emmy Awards	Outstanding Character Voice-Over Performance	Julie Andrews (for "Into The Light")	Won	
2026	Gold Derby TV Awards	Best Drama Series	Bridgerton S4	Nominated	
2026	Gold Derby TV Awards	Best Literary Adaptation	Bridgerton S4	Nominated	
2026	Gold Derby TV Awards	Ensemble of the Year	Bridgerton S4	Nominated	
2026	Gold Derby TV Awards	Drama Actress	Yerin Ha	Nominated	
2026	Gold Derby TV Awards	Drama Actor	Luke Thompson	Nominated	
2026	Gold Derby TV Awards	Drama Supporting Actress	Nicola Coughlan	Nominated	
2026	Gold Derby TV Awards	Breakthrough Performer of the Year	Yerin Ha	Nominated	
2026	Gold Derby TV Awards	Drama Guest Actress	Simone Ashley	Won	
2026	Gold Derby TV Awards	Drama Guest Actor	Jonathan Bailey	Won	
2026	Golden Trailer Awards	Most Innovative Advertising for a TV/Streaming Series	Bridgerton S4, You Shall Go To The Ball, Netflix, MAKE IT SOCIAL	Won	
2026	National Film Awards UK	Best TV Drama Series	Bridgerton S4	Won	
2026	National Film Awards UK	Best Actor in a TV Series	Luke Thompson	Nominated	
2026	National Film Awards UK	Best Supporting Actor in a TV Series	Victor Alli	Nominated	
2026	National Film Awards UK	Best Supporting Actress in a TV Series	Masali Baduza	Nominated	
2026	National Film Awards UK	Best Newcomer	Yerin Ha	Nominated	
2026	National Television Awards	Best Returning Drama	Bridgerton	Nominated	
2026	National Television Awards	Best Performer	Luke Thompson	Nominated	
2026	National Television Awards	Best Performer	Yerin Ha	Nominated	
2026	Primetime Creative Arts Emmy Awards	Outstanding Choreography for Scripted Programming	Sean "Jack" Murphy (Pink / Full Circle / Recital / Masquerade / Stag)	Nominated	
2026	Primetime Creative Arts Emmy Awards	Outstanding Character Voice-Over Performance	Julie Andrews (for "The Waltz")	Won	
2026	Primetime Creative Arts Emmy Awards	Outstanding Period Costumes	John Glaser, Amanda McLaughlan, Dougie Hawkes, George Sayer, Anthony Brookman and Pascha Hanaway (for "Dance in The Country")	Nominated	
2026	Primetime Creative Arts Emmy Awards	Outstanding Period or Fantasy/Sci-Fi Hairstyling	Nic Collins, Giorgio Galliero, Jade Clarke, Valentina Nesti, Katharine Scott, Laura Hartney (for "The Waltz")	Won	
2026	SEC Awards	Streaming Series	Bridgerton	Won	
2026	SEC Awards	Best Actor in an International Series	Luke Thompson	Nominated	
2026	SEC Awards	Best Actress in an International Series	Yerin Ha	Won	
2026	Set Decorators Society of America (SDSA) Television	Best Achievement In Décor/Design of a One Hour Period Series	Bridgerton	Nominated	

=== Cultural impact ===
Fashion and interior design trends influenced or made popular by the series have been dubbed "Regencycore" or "the Bridgerton effect". Lyst reported an increase in searches for items such as corsets, headpieces, and elbow-length gloves after the series' premiere. The series' first two female leads, Daphne and Kate, were also linked to a popularity in the colors sky blue and lilac respectively. In 2021, Abigail Barlow and Emily Bear wrote a concept album based on characters and situations in season 1 of the series titled The Unofficial Bridgerton Musical, which won the 2022 Grammy Award for Best Musical Theater Album. After the two presented the songs from the album live in concert at the Kennedy Center in July 2022, Netflix sued them for copyright infringement.

To ring in the second season, an official "Queen's Ball" was held in Washington DC, Chicago, Montréal, and Los Angeles, with similar events and experiences taking place in London and Johannesburg. Bloomingdale's put together a Bridgerton-themed pop-up collection and tea bar, displaying real costumes from the series in the U.S. for the first time in its 59th Street windows.

After season two featured the main characters playing pall-mall, a lawn game considered to be the precursor to croquet, retailer John Lewis reported a 90% rise in sales for croquet sets. There was also a notable increase in internet searches and purchases of tiaras and corsets after season two's premiere.

Stately homes around England saw an uptick in interest and visitors. Regarding Ranger's House, Chris Small of English Heritage said, "Since the launch of Bridgerton in 2020, we have seen many people who were previously unaware of the site inspired to visit." Walking tours of the filming locations of the series have also been created, including an official one by Netflix. Castle Howard opened an exhibition titled Castle Howard on Screen: From Brideshead to Bridgerton in May 2022.

The finale episode of the 33rd season of The Simpsons on May 22, 2022, featured Marge and her friends watching a period drama called "Tunnelton" with a narrator who sounds like Lady Whistledown, and a character emerging drenched from a lake, like Anthony in the fifth episode of the second season. The creators behind "Rogue", the sixth episode of the 2024 season of Doctor Who, took great inspiration from Bridgerton as the episode revolves around intrigue and romance at an English country party in 1813, with the show being directly referenced by main character Ruby Sunday.

After season three part one, "The Carriage Scene" became a standalone viral moment for the series, and was individually nominated for a BAFTA P&O Cruises Memorable Moment Award and an Edinburgh TV Award for TV Moment of the Year, winning the latter award on August 21, 2025, at the Edinburgh International Television Festival. The romantic moment between season three leads Colin and Penelope would go on to be directly referenced in episode 3 of Emily in Paris season four when character Mindy Chen jokes "Oh! Someone's living out their horny Bridgerton fantasies" when she sees a carriage rocking outside of a ball. Bridgerton's carriage scene's social impact also inspired comparisons between the friends to lovers storylines of Bridgerton's "Polin" and The Gilded Age's "Larian" when a carriage scene was used in advertisements for The Gilded Age season three in summer of 2025. In October 2024, Netflix would use "The Carriage Scene" with the tagline "What a Ride" and the timestamp of the scene as the advertisement to launch their "Moments" feature to the Netflix mobile app. The orchestral cover of "Give Me Everything" arranged by Archer Marsh that was used to score The Carriage Scene also contributed to the scene's virality on the social media app TikTok. The original artist Pitbull later took to Instagram to post the scene with the caption "This again shows the world how music is the international language that transcends over boundaries more so how a hit song can remain timeless."

Netflix tripled its brand partnerships for season 3, and the Queen's Ball expanded to a dozen cities in addition to an afternoon tea event at the Lanesborough in London. The Wrap called Bridgerton fans a "ripe testing group" for this international merchandising and live-experience strategy from Netflix, comparing it to the likes of Disney and Universal franchises.

== Historical inaccuracies ==
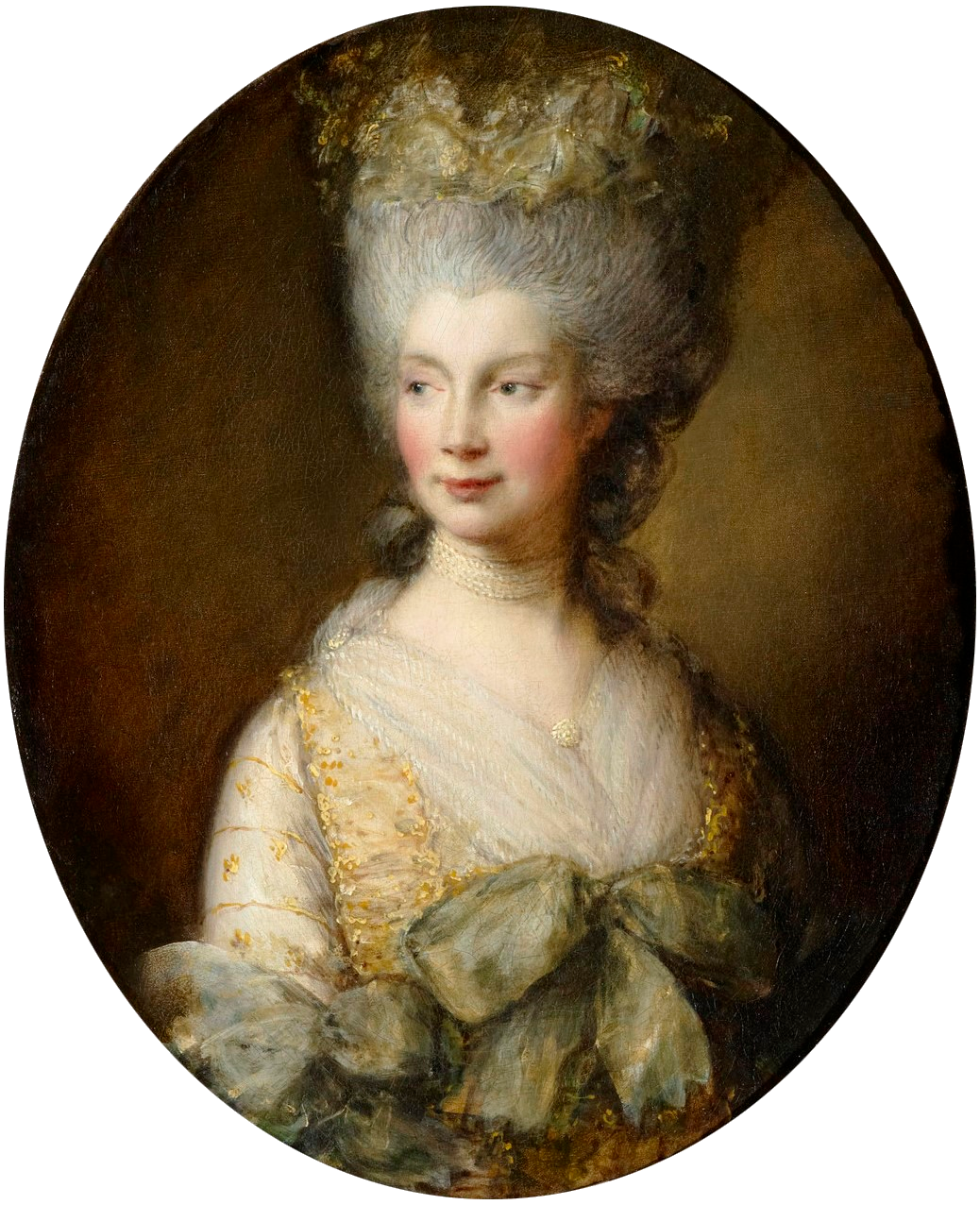
A portrait of Queen Charlotte, painted by Thomas Gainsborough

Chris Van Dusen has said that although the show takes place during the Regency era, it "is a reimagined world, we're not a history lesson, it's not a documentary. What we're really doing with the show is marrying history and fantasy in what I think is a very exciting way. One approach that we took to that is our approach to race." The Bridgerton family, Lady Whistledown, and most of the other characters in the show are fictional.

The theory that Queen Charlotte may have had African ancestry has been called an unhistorical assertion by most scholars. In an interview with Insider magazine, American historian Marlene Koenig said the show's representation of Regency-era London was more diverse than it was in reality, adding that "diversity as we know what the word means did not exist" in Britain during that period. Some classical music pieces used in the first season were composed later than 1813, the year of the first season. Examples include Dmitri Shostakovich's Suite for Variety Orchestra, which was written sometime after 1956, and "Belle nuit, ô nuit d'amour" from Jacques Offenbach's 1881 opera The Tales of Hoffmann.

Historians have pointed out inaccuracies in clothing, such as the show using corsets to represent the oppression placed on women in society, instead of as supportive undergarments they were considered as in the Regency era. In a scene from season 1, Daphne is seen with bruises on her back from the corset, when at the time it was universal to wear a chemise under it to prevent this as much as possible. Fabrics and patterns appearing in the show are too modern compared to the ones used in the historical period in which the events are supposed to take place. Other historical inaccuracies include the lack of bonnets and the contemporary styles of the fabrics and colors.

The majority of the show's historical inaccuracies regarding clothing are intentional. The show does not reflect an accurate portrayal of the Regency era but rather a world that "borders on historical fantasy". The show depicts a dramatization of the Regency era, where the show is "rooted in Regency times but the volume is turned up".

== Themes ==
=== Gender ===
A recurring topic throughout the show is gender, especially the role of women in British high society. Chris Van Dusen aimed for the show to have a "running, modern commentary about how, over the last 200 years, everything has changed and nothing has changed, for both women and men."

With the focus on each year's social season, Daphne, Kate, Penelope and the other women struggle against the societal expectations held for them. Daphne Bridgerton, the Queen's Diamond of her season, fights to maintain her high reputation in society and avoid ruin while still marrying for love. Kate Sharma, considered "too old" for marrying, attempts to regain her family's place in high society as she tries to set her sister, Edwina, up to marry well. Eloise Bridgerton, uninterested in marrying and wanting to pursue a more meaningful life, finds herself more politically involved.

The men, on the other hand, face significantly lower stakes to their reputations. After overhearing Anthony say that he desires a more agreeable wife, Kate confronts him on his viewpoints toward women and argues that Anthony's high standards for women do not match the standards he has for himself.

=== Race ===
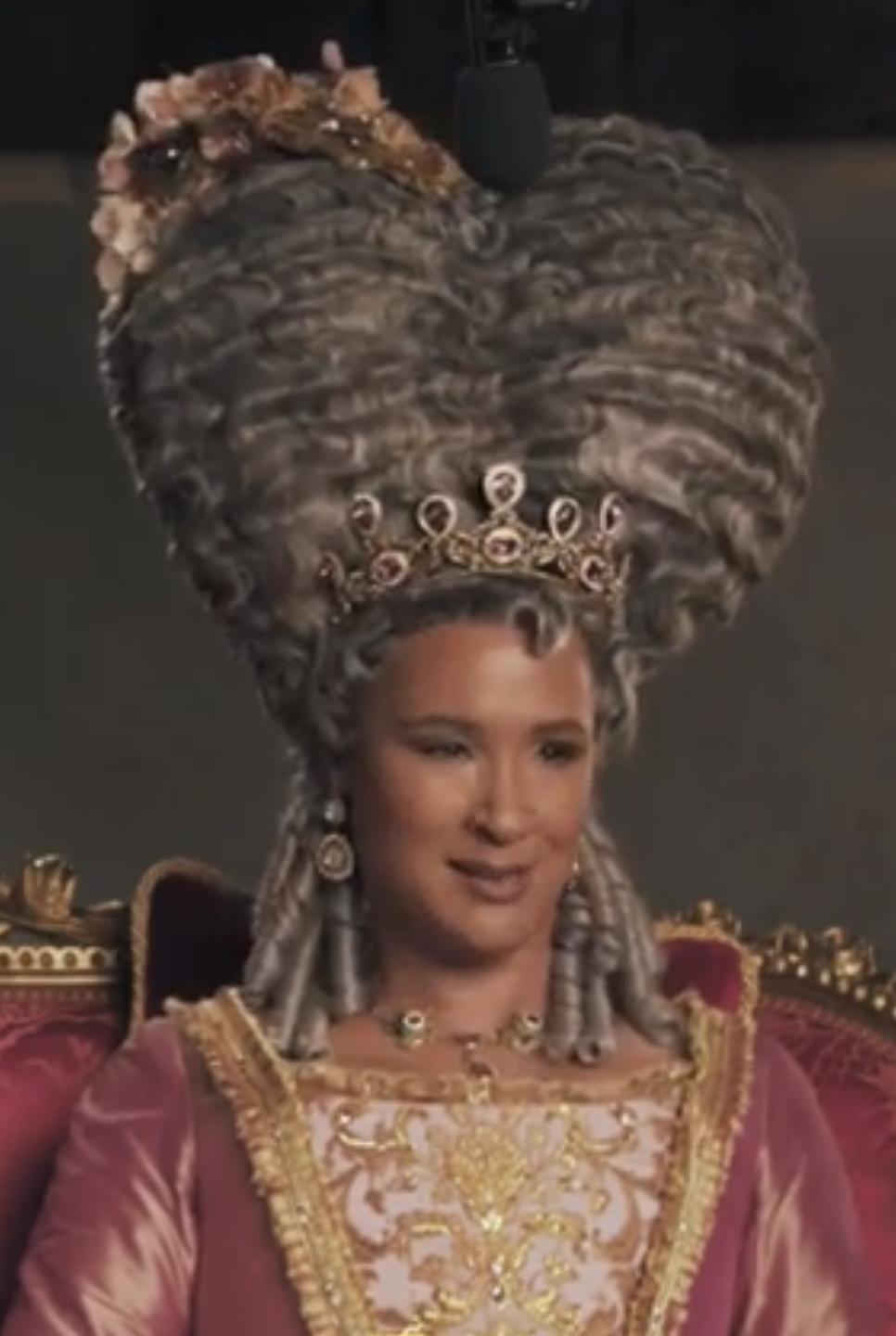
Queen Charlotte in the series as portrayed by Golda Rosheuvel

A notable, modernized twist on the show is the diverse cast of characters. Straying from the source novels, Van Dusen "used Queen Charlotte as a centerpiece to weave racial equality in the show." With Queen Charlotte cast as a Black woman, Van Dusen explains, "Could she have used her power to elevate other people of color in society? Could she have given them titles and lands and dukedoms?"

When Simon Basset rejects the idea of pursuing Daphne Bridgerton, Lady Danbury explains that love conquers all, using Queen Charlotte and King George as an example of how their marriage had changed society. Simon counters that, even though Queen Charlotte is currently in power, "Black progress is fragile and dependent on the whims of whichever white king is in charge."

=== Literature ===
Bridgerton also explores the "power of the written word", with authors such as Lady Whistledown having immense influence over the social season with her Society Papers. Similar to how media can strongly sway public opinion, Van Dusen makes the statement that "social media is kind of like a modern-day corset".

Throughout the show, Lady Whistledown releases Society Papers that comment on notable figures during the social season, whether it be praising them or airing out their secrets. The pamphlets' influence is enough to sway even Queen Charlotte herself, who seeks to find the author of the Society Papers in order to shut them down.

== Prequel miniseries ==
=== Queen Charlotte prequel ===
In May 2021, Netflix ordered a limited prequel series from Shondaland to focus on young Queen Charlotte, a character who does not appear in the Bridgerton novels. Rhimes wrote the spin-off and served as executive producer alongside Betsy Beers and Tom Verica. Rosheuvel, Andoh, Gemmell, and Fleet reprise their roles, while India Amarteifio, Michelle Fairley, Corey Mylchreest, and Arsema Thomas were cast, together with Connie Jenkins-Greig, who plays young Violet. In September 2022, Netflix announced that Queen Charlotte: A Bridgerton Story would be the title for the series and released the first look. The series was released on Netflix on May 4, 2023, consisting of six episodes.

=== Violet Bridgerton prequel ===
In October 2026, Netflix greenlit a limited prequel series from Shondaland to focus on the early life of a young Violet Bridgerton and her romance with Viscount Edmund Bridgerton. Shonda Rhimes is set to serve as writer, executive producer and co-showrunner, along with Nicholas Nardini, who also collaborated with Rhimes on Queen Charlotte. Betsy Beers and Tom Verica will also serve as executive producers on the series.

== See also ==
- List of Primetime Emmy Awards received by Netflix
