= The King's Breakfast =

The King's Breakfast may refer to:

- The King's Breakfast (poem), A. A. Milne poem
- The King's Breakfast (film), 1963 film based on the poem
