= A Gallery of Children =

1925 book by A. A. Milne

- First edition (UK)
- Author: A. A. Milne
- Illustrator: Henriette Willebeek le Mair
- Language: English
- Genre: Children's literature
- Published: 1925
- Publisher: Stanley Paul (UK); David McKay Company (US)
- Publication place: United Kingdom
- Media type: Print (hardcover)
- Pages: 105 pp
- Text: A Gallery of Children at Wikisource

A Gallery of Children is a collection of twelve children's fantasy stories by A. A. Milne, illustrated by Saida (Henriette Willebeek le Mair). It was first published in hardcover in 1925 by the Stanley Paul & Co. in London and the David McKay Company in Philadelphia.

The collection was the author's second children's book and first book of prose for children, appearing between his poetry collection When We Were Very Young (1924) and Winnie-the-Pooh (1926).

The twelve Henriette Willebeek Le Mair illustrations were originally commissioned by the Colgate company for a series of magazine advertisements. In response to their popularity, Milne wrote an imaginative tale for each of the Le Mair watercolor drawings. He described the short stories as "a fanciful elaboration of each picture." A 1976 review described the "plot and even character [as being] incidental to Milne's fond little jibes in these nursery-sized anecdotes of manners."

In 2021, the book entered the public domain.

== Contents ==
- "The Princess and the Apple-Tree"
- "Sparrow Tree Square"
- "The Twins"
- "Miss Waterlow in Bed"
- "Sand Babies"
- "Poor Anne"
- "A Voyage to India"
- "Barbara's Birthday"
- "The Baby Show"
- "The Magic Hill"
- "The Three Daughters of M. Dupont"
- "Castles by the Sea"
