= Sunnyside, Oregon =

Sunnyside may refer to one of several places in the U.S. state of Oregon:

- Sunnyside, Clackamas County, Oregon, a census-designated place
- Sunnyside, Marion County, Oregon, an unincorporated community
- Sunnyside, Portland, Oregon, a neighborhood in the city of Portland
- Sunnyside, Umatilla County, Oregon, an unincorporated community

== See also ==
- Sunnyside (disambiguation)
