= Sunnyside =

Sunnyside and Sunny Side may refer to:

== Arts and entertainment ==
- Sunnyside (1919 film), written, directed and starring Charlie Chaplin
- Sunnyside (1979 film), starring Joey Travolta
- Sunnyside (American TV series), a sitcom that premiered in September 2019
- Sunnyside (Canadian TV series), a sketch comedy TV series
- Sunnyside (novel), a 2009 novel by Glen David Gold
- Sunnyside Records, a New York City jazz record label
- The Sunny Side, a collection of short stories and essays by A. A. Milne

== Places (including buildings) ==
=== Australia ===
- Sunnyside, Kangaroo Point, a heritage-listed house in Brisbane, Queensland
- Sunnyside, North Adelaide, a heritage-listed home designed by owner-architect F. Kenneth Milne in 1936
- Sunnyside, Queensland, a rural locality
- Sunnyside, South Australia, a hamlet and semi-rural locality
- Sunnyside, Tasmania, a rural locality
- Sunnyside, Western Australia, a rural locality

=== Canada ===
- Sunnyside, Calgary, Alberta, a neighborhood
- Sunnyside, Surrey, British Columbia, a neighborhood of South Surrey
- Sunnyside, Newfoundland and Labrador, Canada, a town
- Sunnyside, Toronto, Ontario, Canada, a lakefront district
  - Sunnyside Amusement Park (1922–1955) a popular lakeside attraction, including
    - Sunnyside Bathing Pavilion

=== New Zealand ===
- Sunnyside Hospital, a mental hospital in Christchurch

=== South Africa ===
- Sunnyside, Pretoria, South Africa, a suburb of Pretoria
  - Sunnyside (House of Assembly of South Africa constituency)

=== United Kingdom ===
- Sunnyside (Hitchin), Hertfordshire, England, a residential area of the market town of Hitchin
- Sunnyside (Luss), a listed building in Scotland
- Sunnyside, a suburb of Coatbridge, Scotland

=== United States ===
- Sunnyside, Arizona, a populated place
- Sunnyside Plantation, a cotton plantation in Arkansas, United States
- Sunnyside, Fresno County, California, a census-designated place
- Sunnyside, Placer County, California, an unincorporated community
- Sunnyside, San Francisco, California, a neighborhood
- Sunnyside, Denver, Colorado, a neighborhood
- Sunnyside, Florida, an unincorporated community
- Sunny Side, Georgia, a census-designated place and former city
- Sunnyside, Georgia, a census-designated place
- Sunnyside (East Chicago), Illinois, a neighborhood
- Sunnyside, Illinois, a former village now part of Johnsburg, Illinois
- Sunnyside, Kentucky, an unincorporated community
- Sunny Side, Maryland, an unincorporated community
- Sunnyside (Aquasco, Maryland), a home on the National Register of Historic Places (NRHP)
- Sunnyside Township, Wilkin County, Minnesota
- Sunnyside, Mississippi, an unincorporated community
- Sunnyside, Nevada, an unincorporated community
- Sunnyside, New Jersey
- Sunnyside, Queens, New York, a neighborhood of New York City
- Sunnyside (Richfield Springs, New York), a home listed on the NRHP
- Sunnyside, Staten Island, New York, a neighborhood
- Sunnyside (Tarrytown, New York), home of Washington Irving, a National Historic Landmark
- Sunnyside (Wendell, North Carolina), a home listed on the NRHP
- Sunnyside, Clackamas County, Oregon, a census-designated place
- Sunnyside, Portland, Oregon, a neighborhood
- Sunnyside, Umatilla County, Oregon, a community
- Sunnyside (Edisto Island, South Carolina), a plantation house listed on the NRHP
- Sunnyside (Greenwood, South Carolina), a home listed on the NRHP
- Sunnyside Township, Pennington County, South Dakota
- Sunnyside (Nashville, Tennessee), a mansion listed on the NRHP
- Sunnyside, Castro County, Texas, an unincorporated community
- Sunnyside, Houston, Texas, a neighborhood
- Sunnyside, Menard County, Texas, a ghost town
- Sunny Side, Waller County, Texas, an unincorporated community
- Sunnyside, Utah, a former city, merged with the neighboring city of East Carbon
- Sunnyside (Charlottesville, Virginia), a home listed on the NRHP
- Sunnyside (Clarksville, Virginia), a plantation house listed on the NRHP
- Sunnyside (Heathsville, Virginia), a plantation house listed on the NRHP
- Sunnyside (Lexington, Virginia), a home listed on the NRHP
- Sunnyside (Newsoms, Virginia), a plantation house and complex listed on the NRHP
- Sunnyside (Washington, Virginia), a farm complex and national historic district listed on the NRHP
- Sunnyside, Washington, a city
- Sunnyside, Tyler County, West Virginia, an unincorporated community
- Sunnyside, Wisconsin, an unincorporated community

== Stations ==
- Coatbridge Sunnyside railway station, in Coatbridge, North Lanarkshire, Scotland
- Sunnyside railway station, New South Wales, Australia
- Sunnyside station (Calgary), in Calgary, Alberta, Canada
- Sunnyside station (Toronto), in Toronto, Ontario, Canada
- Sunnyside station (New York), a proposed station in Queens, New York, United States
- Sunnyside Yard, an Amtrak-owned coach yard in Queens, New York, United States
- Sunnyside station (Pennsylvania), in Pittsburgh, Pennsylvania, United States

== Other uses ==
- Nevada State Route 318, United States, also known as Sunnyside Road
- Georgia State Route 288, United States, also known as Sunnyside Road

== See also ==
- Sunnyside High School (disambiguation)
- Sunnyside–Tahoe City, California
- Sunnyside–Central Terrace Historic District, Winston-Salem, North Carolina
- Sunny (disambiguation)
- Sunnyside Farm (disambiguation)
