= Sunnyside Park =

Sunnyside Park may refer to:

- Sunnyside Amusement Park in Toronto, Ontario
- Sunnyside Park in Parkland, Alberta
- Sunnyside Park in New Paris, Indiana

== See also ==
- Sunnyside (disambiguation)
