= Now We Are Six =

1927 poetry collection by A.A. Milne

- First edition (Methuen)
- Author: A. A. Milne
- Illustrator: E. H. Shepard
- Language: English
- Series: Winnie-the-Pooh
- Genre: Children's poetry
- Publisher: Methuen & Co. Ltd. (London)
- Publication place: United Kingdom
- Media type: Print (hardback and paperback)
- Preceded by: When We Were Very Young
- Text: Now We Are Six at Wikisource

Now We Are Six is a 1927 book of children's poetry by A. A. Milne, with illustrations by E. H. Shepard. It is the second collection of children's poems following Milne's When We Were Very Young, which was first published in 1924. The collection contains thirty-five poems, including eleven that feature Winnie-the-Pooh illustrations.

== Title ==
The final poem in the collection, "The End", is written in the voice of a six-year-old looking back at the immature first five years of his or her life, and concluding "But now I am Six, I'm as clever as clever. / So I think I'll be six now for ever and ever." This conceit gives the book its title. The poem was subsequently republished under the title "Now We Are Six".

== Contents ==
1. "Solitude"
2. "King John's Christmas"
3. "Busy"
4. "Sneezles"
5. "Binker"
6. "Cherry Stones"
7. "The Knight Whose Armour Didn't Squeak"
8. "Buttercup Days"
9. "The Charcoal-Burner"
10. "Us Two"
11. "The Old Sailor"
12. "The Engineer"
13. "Journey's End"
14. "Furry Bear"
15. "Forgiven"
16. "The Emperor's Rhyme"
17. "Knight-in-Armour"
18. "Come Out with Me"
19. "Down by the Pond"
20. "The Little Black Hen"
21. "The Friend"
22. "The Good Little Girl"
23. "A Thought"
24. "King Hilary and The Beggarman"
25. "Swing Song"
26. "Explained"
27. "Twice Times"
28. "The Morning Walk"
29. "Cradle Song"
30. "Waiting at The Window"
31. "Pinkle Purr"
32. "Wind on the Hill"
33. "Forgotten"
34. "In the Dark"
35. "The End"

== Analysis ==
I've had my supper,
And had my supper,
And HAD my supper and all;
I've heard the story
Of Cinderella,
And how she went to the ball;
I've cleaned my teeth,
And I've said my prayers,
And I've cleaned and said them right;
And they've all of them been
And kissed me lots,
They've all of said "Good-night."

— A. A. Milne, "In the Dark"

The book's collection of poems have recurring themes of childlike innocence and characteristics that numerous scholars have studied. The cognitive psychologist George Miller has argued that the poem "In the Dark" was inspired by crib talk. Furthermore, "In the Dark" can be read as an endorsement of childhood "as a golden era where... innocence, unqualified parental love, [and] irresponsibility" are commonly occurring traits. Author Elena Goodwin postulates that "King Hilary and the Beggarman" characterizes the poem's titular character as "like a small child, [that] excitedly anticipates the various Christmas gifts that" he will receive.

Christopher Robin with Winnie-the-Pooh and Piglet from "In the Dark"

== Legacy ==
The book's title and function as a collection of poems has been parodied or influential following its publication. In 2003, Neil Gaiman released Now We Are Sick, a poem anthology book featuring sci-fi, fantasy, and horror poems that thirty authors wrote. In 2017, the BBC and James Goss released Doctor Who: Now We Are Six Hundred, which featured a collection of poems about The Doctor with illustrations by then Doctor Who show-runner, Russell T Davies.

By 1928, soprano Mimi Crawford recorded some poems from the collection set to music. Harold Fraser-Simon created the compositions.

The poem "Us Two" features Christopher Robin and Winnie-the-Pooh spending time together. Some of the language in this poem is paraphrased by the song "Forever & Ever" from Pooh's Grand Adventure.

So wherever I am, there's always Pooh,
There's always Pooh and Me.
"What would I do?" I said to Pooh,
"If it wasn't for you," and Pooh said: "True,
It isn't much fun for One, but Two,
Can stick together, says Pooh, says he. "That's how it is," says Pooh.

— A. A. Milne, "Us Two"

The book entered the public domain in the United States in 2023 along with other 1927 works.
