= Nils Bohman =

Swedish writer, translator and journalist (1902–1943)

- Born: 9 September 1902; Jakob and Johannes Parish, Stockholm, Sweden
- Died: 1 December 1943 (aged 41); Sollentuna Parish, Uppland, Sweden
- Education: Stockholm University College
- Spouse: Märta Burman (m. 1933)

Nils Axel Erik Bohman (9 September 1902 – 1 December 1943) was a Swedish writer, translator and journalist.

== Biography ==
After graduating from the Stockholm University College in 1928, he worked at the Stockholm Burgher School as a teacher. Between 1928 and 1934, 1932–1943 and 1934–1936, he was a co-editor of Nya Dagligt Allehanda, Bonniers litterära magasin and Nu respectively. He was also the editor-in-chief of Svenska män och kvinnor. He often used Nikolaus Brusenbaum and Sven i Rosengård as pseudonyms.

== Publications ==
=== Own works ===
- Kalliope i staden: dikter (1932, Wahlström & Widstrand)
- Den onda elden: en Stockholmssägen (1935, Wahlström & Widstrand)
- Skämt för sjuka (1936, Wahlström & Widstrand)
- Familjeliv: 40 teckningar (1938, Norstedt), co-written by Heino Focken
- Jumbo i djungeln (1938, Bonnier)
- Befrielse: dikter (1942, Wahlström & Widstrand)

=== Editings ===
- Svenska män och kvinnor (1942–1955, Bonnier, vol. 1–8)

=== Translations ===
- Mysteriernas ö (Natur & kultur, 1929), translation of The Magic Island (1929) by William Seabrook
- Gåtan på Red House (Bonnier, 1933), translation of The Red House Mystery (1922) by A. A. Milne
- Okynniga svartingar (Wahlström & Widstrand, 1935), translation of Black Mischief (1932) by Evelyn Waugh
- "Den fredliga draken" (Algas konst & bokförlag, 1943), translation of "The Reluctant Dragon" (1898) by Kenneth Grahame
