= Four Days' Wonder =

1936 film

- Directed by: Sidney Salkow
- Written by: Harvey F. Thew; Michael Uris
- Based on: Four Days Wonder by A.A. Milne
- Produced by: Robert Presnell Sr.
- Starring: Jeanne Dante; Kenneth Howell; Martha Sleeper; Alan Mowbray
- Cinematography: Stanley Cortez
- Edited by: Russell F. Schoengarth; Maurice Wright
- Music by: Charles Previn
- Production company: Universal Pictures
- Distributed by: Universal Pictures
- Release date: December 3, 1936
- Running time: 60 minutes
- Country: United States
- Language: English

Four Days' Wonder is a 1936 American comedy mystery film directed by Sidney Salkow and starring Jeanne Dante, Kenneth Howell and Martha Sleeper. Produced by Universal Pictures, the film is based on the 1933 novel "Four Days' Wonder" by British writer A. A. Milne (New York, 1933). It was the first feature directed by Sidney Salkow.

== Plot ==
A child is accused of murder.

== Production ==
Filming started 5 August 1936. Star Jeanne Dante was on Broadway in Call It a Day.
