= The Ugly Duckling (play) =

Play written by A. A. Milne

The Ugly Ducking
- Original language: English
- Written by: A.A. Milne
- Characters: The Prince; The Princess; The King; The Queen; Dulcibella; Carlo; The Chancellor; The Voice
- Genre: Comedy
- Setting: Throne Room of the Palace

The Ugly Duckling is a one-act play by A.A. Milne written c. 1941.

== Plot ==
The king and queen are worried because their daughter, Princess Camilla, is very plain, or rather appears to be plain because of a spell put on her at birth. The spell says that only the eyes of true love will reveal her beauty. Her parents come up with a plan to marry her to a prince from a far-away land who is unaware of what she looks like. They force Camilla to trade places with her beautiful but unrealistically emptyheaded maid, Dulcibella, before the prince arrives.

However, Prince Simon has also disguised himself as his servant Carlo, and dressed Carlo up as the prince because he felt he wasn't handsome enough. Both the pretend prince and princess are insanely dull-witted, which just adds to the entertainment. Before the marriage of the two servants dressed as royalty, the real prince meets the real princess and they reveal their identity and begin to understand each other.

Prince Simon tells Princess Camilla that she is very beautiful, although all other princes have found her to be hideously ugly. Then the princess reveals that she was given a gift from her great-aunt that would make everyone ignorant of her real beauty, so that she wouldn't grow up vain – until the day she met her one true love. The play ends with a riddle, required to be answered correctly by the prince before he can wed the princess.

What is it which has four legs and mews like a cat? — The Chancellor

Despite the fact that Carlo, the mock-prince, was given the correct answer beforehand, he answers incorrectly. The answer clearly should have been "cat", but Carlo's answer was "dog", as the King told him the answer to the riddle propounded to Camilla's last suitor, and the Chancellor asked a slightly different one. Yet with some quick thinking from Prince Simon, Carlo gets the answer right because Simon claims that what is referred to in this country as "cat" is referred to as "dog" in the mock-prince's country.

In our country, we have an animal to which we have given the name “dog,” or, in the local dialect of the more mountainous districts, “doggie.” It sits by the fireside and purrs. — The Prince

At the very end, the king wonders why Princess Camilla is suddenly beautiful when the audience can see that it is because of the blessing–curse coming to fruition—Camilla has found her true love, the first one to whom she appears lovely.

== Adaptations ==
The Fall 2009 issue of the University of San Francisco literary journal Switchback features a story by Charles Haddox, "The Ugly Duckling", about a girl who has her own ugly duckling experience after being chosen to play the role of Princess Camilla in her junior high school's production of the play.

In 1985 "The Ugly Duckling" was adapted by Simon Johnston for two actors and a music trio ( www.simonjohnston.ca ). It was commissioned by Laura Schlessinger, artistic director of Music Mosaic (The New Concert Theatre Society) based in Canmore Alberta. Allan Bell composed the music and Bev Ross wrote the libretto. The production, directed by Simon Johnston, featured knee-high puppets designed and constructed by Felix Mirbt of Sutton, Quebec. Karen Skidmore and Patrick Meschukuleit performed all the roles, songs and puppet manipulation.
