= The Red House Mystery =

1922 novel by A. A. Milne

- First edition
- Author: A. A. Milne
- Cover artist: Frank Wright
- Language: English
- Genre: Mystery novel
- Publisher: Methuen (UK) & E.P. Dutton (USA)
- Publication date: 6 April 1922
- Publication place: United Kingdom
- Media type: Print (hardback & paperback)

The Red House Mystery is a whodunnit by A. A. Milne, published in 1922. It was Milne's only mystery novel (except for Four Days Wonder).

== Plot introduction ==
The setting is an English country house, where Mark Ablett has been entertaining a house party consisting of a widow and her marriageable daughter, a retired major, a wilful actress, and Bill Beverley, a young man about town. Mark's long-lost brother Robert, the black sheep of the family, arrives from Australia and shortly thereafter is found dead, shot through the head. Mark Ablett has disappeared, so Tony Gillingham, a stranger who has just arrived to call on his friend Bill, decides to investigate. Gillingham plays Sherlock Holmes to his younger counterpart's Doctor Watson; they progress almost playfully through the novel while the clues mount up and the theories abound.

== Literary significance and criticism ==
The Red House Mystery was immediately popular; Alexander Woollcott called it "one of the three best mystery stories of all time", though Raymond Chandler, in his essay The Simple Art of Murder (1944), criticised Woollcott for that claim, referring to him as "rather a fast man with a superlative". Chandler wrote of Milne's novel, "It is an agreeable book, light, amusing in the Punch style, written with a deceptive smoothness that is not as easy as it looks [...] Yet, however light in texture the story may be, it is offered as a problem of logic and deduction. If it is not that, it is nothing at all. There is nothing else for it to be. If the situation is false, you cannot even accept it as a light novel, for there is no story for the light novel to be about."

In his introduction to the 1926 UK edition, A. A. Milne said he had "a passion" for detective stories, having "all sorts of curious preferences" about them: though in real life the best detectives and criminals are professionals, Milne demanded that the detective be an unscientific amateur, accompanied by a likable Watson, rubbing shoulders with an amateur villain against whom dossiers and fingerprints are of no avail.

Chandler's essay rejects this model, declaring: "It is the ladies and gentlemen of what Mr. Howard Haycraft (in his book Murder for Pleasure) calls the Golden Age of Detective Fiction that really get me down." He uses The Red House Mystery to illustrate the problems he saw in many mystery stories of this type, particularly the central puzzle (which was intricate and clever but implausible in many ways) and the fact that the amateur detective's chance to shine comes only because the police are incompetent and surprisingly willing to put up with a "brash amateur" romping through their territory. ("English police seem to endure him with their customary stoicism; but I shudder to think of what the boys down at the Homicide Bureau in my city would do to him.")

Chandler noted that The Red House Mystery seemed to have been in print in the US for about 16 years. "That happens to few books of any kind." By 1948, 23 editions had been published in the UK. The most recent UK reprint was the Hatchard's limited edition in cloth binding, stylish dust jacket and beautiful endpapers, published in 2022.

== Selected Release details ==
- 1922, UK, Methuen (ISBN ?), Pub date 6 April 1922, hardback (First edition)
- 1922, USA, E. P. Dutton (ISBN ?), Pub date ? ? 1922, hardback
- 1926, UK, Methuen, includes an introduction by A. A. Milne (dated April 1926)
- 1926 ? UK, The Library Press Ltd. In the Minerva Editions series. Inc: the 1926 introduction.
- 1937, UK, Methuen's Modern Classics, Pub date ? March 1937, hardback
- 1938, UK Odhams Press, hardback as "Four Great Detective Novels"
- 1938, UK Penguin paperback
- 1970, USA, E. P. Dutton (ISBN 0-525-18941-6), Pub date ? May 1970, hardback
- 1980, USA, Dell Publishing (ISBN 0-440-17376-0), Pub date ? November 1980, paperback (a Murder Ink(R) Mystery)
- 1983, UK, Methuen Publishing (ISBN 0-413-52040-4), Pub date 5 May 1983, hardback
- 1992, UK, John Curley & Assoc (ISBN 0-7927-0853-9), Pub date ? March 1992, paperback (Large print books)
- 2000, UK, Dover Publications (ISBN 0-486-40129-4), Pub date 1 February 2000, paperback
- 2002, USA, BJU Press (ISBN 1-57924-702-4), Pub date ? January 2002, paperback
- 2003, UK, Wildside Press (ISBN 1-59224-219-7), Pub date ? October 2003, paperback
- 2005, UK, Dodo Press (ISBN 1-905432-90-9), Pub date 30 September 2005, paperback
- 2008, UK, Vintage Classics (ISBN 978-0099521266), Pub date 6 November 2008, hardback
- 2009, UK, Vintage Classics (ISBN 978-0099521273), Pub date 6 August 2009, paperback.
- 2022, UK, Vintage Classics through Hatchard's Library (ISBN 978-1784878481), Pub date 22 November 2022, hardcover.
