= Vespers (poem) =

1923 poem by A. A. Milne

Illustration by E.H. Shepard

"Vespers" is a poem by the British author A. A. Milne, first published in 1923 by the American magazine Vanity Fair, and later included in the 1924 book of Milne's poems When We Were Very Young when it was accompanied by two illustrations by E. H. Shepard. It was written about the "Christopher Robin" persona of Milne's son Christopher Robin Milne. It predates the creation of Winnie-the-Pooh.

The poem was set to music by Harold Fraser-Simson in 1927 and, under the name Christopher Robin is Saying His Prayers, many commercial recordings of the song were released including by Gracie Fields and Vera Lynn.

In his 1974 memoir, Christopher Milne described it as a "wretched poem" which inaccurately described his thoughts in prayer.

== Publication ==
Milne was established as a successful novelist and playwright when, in late 1922, he wrote the poem for his wife Daphne. He had caught a glimpse of his two-year-old son, Christopher Robin Milne, kneeling by his cot, being taught by his nanny to pray "God bless Mummy, Daddy and Nanny and make me a good boy". He was touched by his child looking so sweet but he realised that the "prayer" had no religious meaning for his son, who was merely reciting it by rote.

He gave Daphne the poem as a present suggesting she could sell it and keep any proceeds so she sent it to Vanity Fair in New York who paid her $50 and published it in January 1923. It was immediately a success and it motivated Milne to write more about "Christopher Robin". Milne was too busy to accept E. V. Lucas' invitation to write regularly for Punch (Note: Milne had been assistant editor of Punch.) but instead he submitted "Vespers" as one (the first written) of a batch of poems for possible publication by Methuen. (Note: Lucas had once worked at Punch and was about to become chairman of Methuen.) It was in considerable part due to Lucas that E. H. Shepard was chosen to illustrate the resulting book When We Were Very Young in which "Vespers" is the last poem. By 1929 the book had reached its 128th printing and in its first ten years, before a cheap edition had been produced, the book sold half a million copies.

== Poem ==
"Vespers" (Note: Vespers is the evening service in Christian churches.) consists of six quatrain stanzas, with the first and last identically worded and describing the general scene of a little boy kneeling by his bed as if in prayer.

Little Boy kneels at the foot of the bed,
Droops on the little hands little gold head.
Hush! Hush! Whisper who dares!
Christopher Robin is saying his prayers.

The intermediate stanzas focus on the child, Christopher Robin, ostensibly praying but actually peeping through half-closed eyes and, with his short attention span, his mind often turning to the events of the day. When he prays for the members of his family it is in terms of what he ought to say rather than his actual feelings of love. The lines of the poem have caesurae particularly when the child's mind turns from prayer to casual thoughts. As printed in the book the child's recitations of prayer, and the first and last stanzas, are in italics.

== Reception ==
Humphrey Carpenter remarks that "Vespers" was produced at the very end of the 50-year Victorian–Edwardian tradition for writing about the "Beautiful Child" in sentimental terms. The poem starts by beguiling the reader into thinking it is following this myth only for the attentive reader to realise that Christopher Robin is not actually praying but he is thinking about the important things in his life.

Milne himself complained that "It is inevitable that a book which has had very large sales should become an object of derision to critics and columnists". It did indeed receive such criticism, sometimes under the misapprehension that Milne had intended the poem to be straightforwardly pious. It was parodied by Beachcomber: "Hush, hush, nobody cares / Christopher Robin has fallen downstairs".

The work has been described as a "saccharine poem", but, on the other hand, it has been, and remains, of great public popularity, often evoking in people personal nostalgic memories of when the poem was frequently read to them in early childhood. (Note: Carpenter says "In fact the irony was not generally perceived, and the poem was taken at face value as a sentimental portrayal of childhood".)

== Subsequent performances and publications ==
E.H. Shephard's drawing to follow the poem. (Note: The teddy bear at the foot of the bed predates Winnie-the-Pooh who had yet to be created.)

In the early 1920s Queen Mary's Dolls' House was being equipped with over 200 miniature volumes of British literature and Milne contributed a volume containing the poem. Many nurseries went on to have a printed copy of the poem hanging up on the wall with the notice appended "Reprinted by permission from the Library of the Queen's Dolls".

Harold Fraser-Simson set "Vespers" to music under the title "Christopher Robin Is Saying His Prayers" and, starting in 1933, many commercial recordings were released including by Gracie Fields in 1938 and Vera Lynn (Note: In his 1974 memoir Christopher Milne wrote: "The general impression left by 'Vespers' – especially with any one who has heard Vera Lynn singing it – is of a rather soppy poem about a good little boy who is saying his prayers".) in 1948. (Note: Melanie released her own version in 1971.) At Milne's funeral Norman Shelley recited "Vespers" to an organ accompaniment.

A manuscript version of the poem and illustration, probably drafted as a working drawing for the publisher to inspect, was sold at auction in 2015 for £35,000. The 2017 film Goodbye Christopher Robin involved Ann Thwaite, Milne's biographer, as consultant and, while making little textual reference to the poem and avoiding infringing on the screen rights of Disney, it concentrates on the effects the fame of the poem had on Christopher Milne.

== A. A. Milne's own attitude to the poem ==
In her later years, Christopher's nanny recalled the occasion of the poem and remembered Milne chuckling to himself as he went downstairs. With hindsight, she thought it was because he had just had the idea for the poem. She thought they were "lovely words", and she did indeed have a dressing gown hanging on the nursery door, just as the poem suggested. In 1990 Ann Thwaite explained that the poem was intentionally ironic with the prayer meaning nothing to the boy – or to Milne himself, who was not religious. However, Christopher Milne himself disputed that this was his father's attitude and thought his father was defending himself from the critics' saying the work was excessively pious.

In his autobiography, Milne wrote:

Finally, let me refer to the poem which has been more sentimentalized over than any other in the book: Vespers. Well, if mothers and aunts and hard-headed reviewers have been sentimental over it, I am glad; for the spectacle in real life of a child of three at its prayers is one over which thousands have been sentimental. It is indeed calculated to bring a lump to the throat. But, even so, one must tell the truth about the matter. Not "God bless mummy, because I love her so" but "God bless Mummy, I know that’s right".

Milne said, "The truth is that prayer means nothing to a child of three, whose thoughts are engaged with other more exciting matters." He wrote of his own thoughts about God:

To conceive the Creator and Inspirer of the universe as anything less tremendous, less terrible, less beautiful, less life-giving than the Sun, is, to me, ridiculous. All life came from the Sun, scientists tell us; all life is sustained by the Sun. I do not think of him as the Sun, for my mind is not large enough to conceive him at all; but when I think of the might and the majesty and the dominion of the Sun, and then turn my thoughts upon myself, I feel that I am in less danger of losing my sense of proportion than are those who think of him in human terms ...

== Effect on Christopher Milne ==
Frank Cottrell-Boyce, one of the screenwriters for Goodbye Christopher Robin, suggested the poem's publication had been "a catastrophically bad parenting decision but a great creative one". When he was four years old, Christopher Robin Milne was proud of "his book" and his parents did not need to shield him from the public reaction. He looked nothing like the boy in Shepard's drawings and he was known in the family as "Billy Moon". (Note: Billy was simply a nickname and Moon derived from how he initially pronounced Milne.) Harold Fraser-Simson set four of the poems, including "Vespers", to music and it was arranged for a recording to be made at the studios of His Master's Voice of seven-year-old Christopher singing them. When he was older, at Stowe School, his classmates used to tease him mercilessly by playing the record to mock him and this only stopped when the record eventually wore out.

Christopher Milne described the work as a poem "that has brought me toe-curling, fist-clenching, lip-biting embarrassment". "It seemed to me almost that my father had got to where he was by climbing upon my infant shoulders," he wrote, "that he had filched from me my good name and had left me with the empty fame of being his son".

Christopher Milne went on to deny that the poem gave an accurate picture of his praying:

The Christopher Robin of that wretched poem is indeed me at the age of three. I retain the most vivid memories of saying my prayers as a child. They go back a long way, but I cannot date them. I well recall how I knelt, how Nanny sat, her hands round mine, and what we said aloud together. Did my thoughts wander? Were they engaged on other, more exciting things? The answer – and let me say it loudly and clearly – is no. Would I agree that prayer meant nothing to a child of three? If the stress is on the last word, I must be careful: I may be thinking of a child of four. All I can accurately say is that I can recall no occasion when this was so.
