= Once a Week (book) =

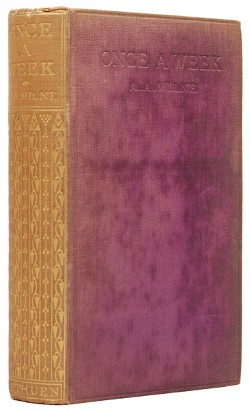
First edition (publ. Methuen)

Once a Week is a collection of short stories and vignettes by A. A. Milne originally published in Punch. The collection was first published on 15 October 1914.

== Contents ==
- "The Heir"
- "Winter Sport"
- "A Baker's Dozen"
- "Getting Married"
- "Home Affairs"
- "Other People's Houses"
- "Burlesques"
- "Merely Players"
- "The Men Who Succeed"
