= Winnie-the-Pooh: Exploring a Classic =

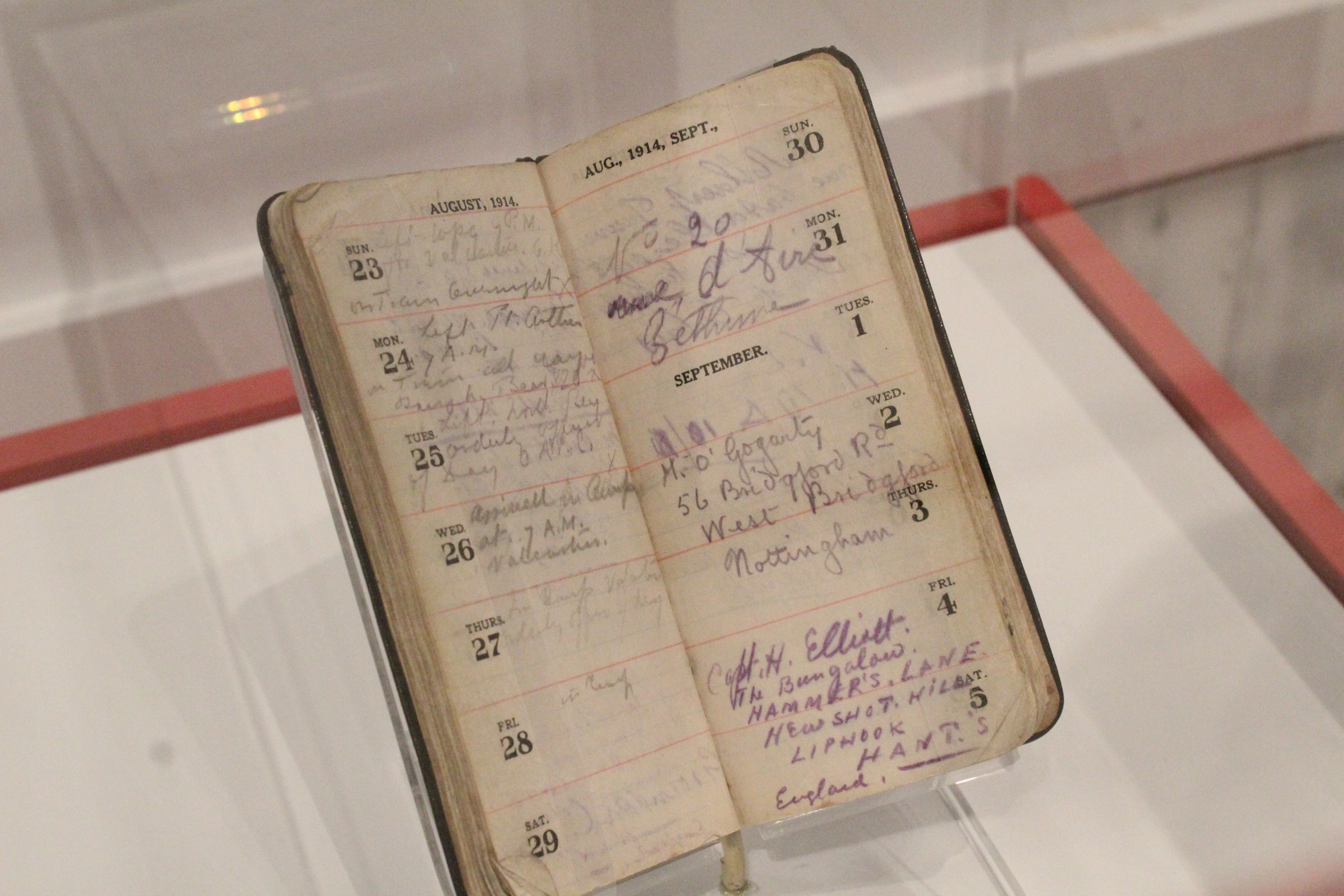
- Diary at the exhibition, Royal Ontario Museum
- Type: Museum exhibition
- Theme: Winnie-the-Pooh

Winnie-the-Pooh: Exploring a Classic was an exhibition on the history of the Winnie-the-Pooh books.

The exhibit includes pages from A. A. Milne and E. H. Shepard's works, a diary from Harry Colebourn, as well as Pooh merchandise. The exhibition has recreations of Christopher Robin's bed and other settings from the Winnie-the-Pooh books.

The tour started at the Victoria and Albert Museum in London and finish at the Royal Ontario Museum in Toronto, Canada.

In Toronto, the exhibit was originally planned to run from 7 March 2020 to 3 August 2020 but was forced to down after 7 days due to the COVID-19 pandemic. It was located inside the Roloff Beny Gallery within the Michael Lee-Chin Crystal. The exhibit reopened on September 1, 2020, with a planned closure of January 17, 2021. It was forced to close again on November 22, 2020, after 83 days.

== Venues ==
| Opening Date | Closing Date | Duration (days) | City | Country | Venue |
|---|---|---|---|---|---|
| 9 December 2017 | 8 April 2018 | 120 | London | United Kingdom | Victoria and Albert Museum |
| 3 June 2018 | 2 September 2018 | 79 | Atlanta | United States | High Museum of Art |
| 22 September 2018 | 6 January 2019 | 106 | Boston | United States | Museum of Fine Arts, Boston |
| 19 February 2019 | 14 April 2019 | 54 | Tokyo | Japan | Bunkamura Museum of Art |
| 22 August 2019 | 5 January 2020 | 136 | Seoul | South Korea | Korean Soma Museum |
| 7 March 2020 | 13 March 2020; 3 August 2020 (planned) | 7; 150 (planned) | Toronto | Canada | Royal Ontario Museum |
| 1 September 2020 | 22 November 2020; 17 January 2020 (planned) | 83; 139 (planned) | Toronto | Canada | Royal Ontario Museum |
