= The Simple Art of Murder =

Book by Raymond Chandler

- First edition
- Author: Raymond Chandler
- Cover artist: Artzybasheff
- Language: English
- Genre: Crime fiction, literary criticism
- Publisher: Houghton Mifflin
- Publication date: 1950
- Publication place: United States
- Media type: Print
- OCLC: 17506654
- Dewey Decimal: 813/.52 19
- LC Class: PS3505.H3224 S56 1988

The Simple Art of Murder is the title of several quasi-connected publications by hard-boiled detective fiction author Raymond Chandler:

- The first, and arguably best-known, is a critical essay on detective fiction, originally published in The Atlantic Monthly in December 1944. A revised, expanded version was included in Howard Haycraft's 1946 anthology The Art of the Mystery Story.
- The second is a separate, shorter essay, mostly describing Chandler's personal experiences writing for pulp magazines, originally published in Saturday Review of Literature, April 15, 1950.
- The third is a short story collection, also originally published in 1950 (by Houghton Mifflin Co.), which contains a number of Chandler's pulp detective stories pre-dating his first novel The Big Sleep.
  - While first editions of this collection feature an abridgement of the Saturday essay as an introduction and the Atlantic essay as an afterword, later editions tend to feature the Atlantic essay as the introduction and relegate the Saturday essay to other collections, most commonly Trouble Is My Business.
  - The exact number of stories collected vary: while the original American hardcover included twelve, many later editions include only eight, and some paperback editions comprise as few as four.

The Atlantic essay is considered a seminal piece of literary criticism. Although Chandler's primary topic is the art (and failings) of contemporary detective fiction, he touches on general literature and modern society as well.

The opening statement – "Fiction in any form has always intended to be realistic" – places Chandler in a lineage with earlier American Realists, in particular Mark Twain and his critique of James Fenimore Cooper, "Fenimore Cooper's Literary Offenses". Chandler dissects A. A. Milne's The Red House Mystery much as Twain tears apart Cooper's The Deerslayer, namely by revealing what is ignored, brushed over, and unrealistic. "If the situation is false," Chandler writes, "you cannot even accept it as a light novel, for there is no story for the light novel to be about." He expands his criticism to the bulk of detective fiction, especially of the English variety which he complains is preoccupied with "hand-wrought dueling pistols, curare and tropical fish." In addition to Milne, Chandler confronts Dame Agatha Christie, Dorothy Sayers, Sir Arthur Conan Doyle, E. C. Bentley, and Freeman Wills Crofts. "The English may not always be the best writers in the world, but they are incomparably the best dull writers." Chandler's critique of the "classic" Golden Age detective story goes beyond a lack of realistic characters and plot; Chandler complains about contrivances and formulas and an inability to move beyond them. The classic detective story "has learned nothing and forgotten nothing."

Chandler reserves his praise for Dashiell Hammett. Although Chandler and Hammett were contemporaries and grouped as the founders of the hard-boiled school, Chandler speaks of Hammett as the "one individual... picked out to represent the whole movement," noting Hammett's mastery of the "American language", his adherence to reality, and that he "gave murder back to the kind of people that commit it for reasons, not just to provide a corpse."

Chandler concludes his essay by moving from reality in literature to reality itself, "a world in which gangsters can rule nations and almost rule cities... it is not a fragrant world, but it is the world you live in." He concludes by outlining his conception (and that of Hammett) of the central character of all detective fiction, the detective himself – a man who provides the contrast to the seediness and immorality in the universe of the "realist" fiction he's championing – "down these mean streets must go a man who is not himself mean...He must be, to use a rather weathered phrase, a man of honor—by instinct, by inevitability, without thought of it, and certainly without saying it." This man must have a keen sense of justice, but not wear it on his sleeve yet not allow it to be corrupted.

== References in other work ==
The Geraldine McEwan telemovie based on Agatha Christie's novel The Murder at the Vicarage shows Miss Marple reading Chandler's book. Early in the telemovie Miss Marple says, "There is never anything simple about murder."

The closing lines of the essay, setting his vision of corruption in the world against the possibility of an uncorrupted man, has been quoted often – as the title of the book Down These Mean Streets and Martin Scorsese's movie Mean Streets.

== External links and references ==
- The Simple Art of Murder at Faded Page (Canada)
- Chandler, Raymond (1950), The Simple Art of Murder ISBN 0-394-75765-3
- The Simple Art of Murder, Random House.
- "The Simple Art of Murder", American Literature (essay), The University of Texas.
- Oates, Joyce Carol. "The Simple Art of Murder". The New York Review of Books.
- Haycraft, Howard (1946), The Art of the Mystery Story, The Universal Library, Grosset & Dunlap, New York
- Chandler, Raymond (1995), Later Novels and Other Writings, The Library of America ISBN 1-883011-08-6
