= When We Were Very Young =

1924 poetry collection by A.A. Milne

- First edition
- Author: A. A. Milne
- Illustrator: E. H. Shepard
- Language: English
- Series: Winnie-the-Pooh
- Genre: Fantasy
- Publisher: Methuen & Co. Ltd. (London)
- Publication date: November 6, 1924
- Publication place: United Kingdom
- Media type: Print (hardback and paperback)
- Followed by: Now We Are Six
- Text: When We Were Very Young at Wikisource

When We Were Very Young is a best-selling book of poetry by A. A. Milne. It was first published in 1924, and it was illustrated by E. H. Shepard. Several of the verses were set to music by Harold Fraser-Simson. The book begins with an introduction entitled "Just Before We Begin", which, in part, tells readers to imagine for themselves who the narrator is, and that it might be Christopher Robin. The 38th poem in the book, "Teddy Bear", that originally appeared in Punch magazine in February 1924, was the first appearance of the famous character Winnie-the-Pooh, first named "Mr. Edward Bear" by Christopher Robin Milne. In one of the illustrations of "Teddy Bear", Winnie-the-Pooh is shown wearing a shirt which was later coloured red when reproduced on a recording produced by Stephen Slesinger. This has become his standard appearance in the Disney adaptations. On 1 January 2020, When We Were Very Young entered the public domain in the United States, but remains protected in some other countries, including the UK.

== Contents ==
1. "Corner of the Street"
2. "Buckingham Palace"
3. "Happiness"
4. "The Christening"
5. "Puppy and I"
6. "Twinkle Toes"
7. "The Four Friends"
8. "Lines and Squares"
9. "Brownie"
10. "Independence"
11. "Nursery Chairs"
12. "Market Square"
13. "Daffodowndilly"
14. "Water Lilies"
15. "Disobedience"
16. "Spring Morning"
17. "The Island"
18. "The Three Foxes"
19. "Politeness"
20. "Jonathan Jo"
21. "At the Zoo"
22. "Rice Pudding"
23. "The Wrong House"
24. "Missing"
25. "The King's Breakfast"
26. "Hoppity"
27. "At Home"
28. "Summer Afternoon"
29. "The Dormouse and the Doctor"
30. "Shoes and Stockings"
31. "Sand Between the Toes"
32. "Knights and Ladies"
33. "Little Bo Peep and Little Boy Blue"
34. "The Mirror"
35. "Halfway Down"
36. "The Invaders"
37. "Before Tea"
38. "Teddy Bear"
39. "Bad Sir Brian Botany"
40. "In the Fashion"
41. "The Alchemist"
42. "Growing Up"
43. "If I Were King"
44. "Vespers"

== See also ==
- Now We Are Six, another book of poetry by A. A. Milne
