= Four Days Wonder =

1933 novel

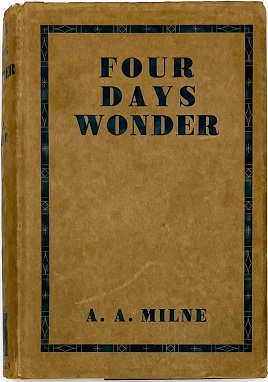
- First edition (UK)
- Author: A.A. Milne
- Language: English
- Genre: Comedy Mystery
- Publisher: Methuen (UK); Dutton (US)
- Publication date: 1933
- Publication place: United Kingdom
- Media type: Print

Four Days Wonder is a 1933 comedy novel by the British writer A.A. Milne. Jenny, the heroine of the story, is an 18 year old orphan, who spends her life daydreaming. Her mind is occupied with an imaginary conversation when she absent-mindedly walks into her old home, now let to a respectable, middle-aged couple. Jenny finds, on the floor, the body of her long-lost Aunt Jane, and suddenly realises that she is in the wrong place at the wrong time.

== Film adaptation ==
In 1936 it was adapted into a film of the same title by the American studio Universal Pictures. Directed by Sidney Salkow it starred Kenneth Howell, Martha Sleeper and Alan Mowbray.

== Bibliography ==
- Cohen, Nadia. The Extraordinary Life of A. A. Milne. Grub Street Publishers, 2017.
- Goble, Alan. The Complete Index to Literary Sources in Film. Walter de Gruyter, 1999.
- Haring-Smith, Tori. A.A. Milne: A Critical Bibliography. Garland, 1982.
- Shaw, Bruce. Jolly Good Detecting: Humor in English Crime Fiction of the Golden Age. McFarland, 2013.
