= Sunnyside Farm (disambiguation) =

Sunnyside Farm is a 1997 British comedy series.

Sunnyside Farm may also refer to:

- Sunnyside (Woodbine, Maryland), an historic slave plantation home in Howard County, Maryland
- Sunnyside Farm (Hamilton, Virginia), an NRHP listing in Loudon County, Virginia
- Sunnyside Farm (Leetown, West Virginia), near Kearneysville, listed on the NRHP in West Virginia
- Sunnyside Farm Barn, Mandan, North Dakota, listed on the NRHP in North Dakota
- Sunnyside Farm House, an NRHP listing in Jessamine County, Kentucky
