= The King's Breakfast (film) =

1963 British film by Wendy Toye

- Opening titles
- Directed by: Wendy Toye
- Screenplay by: Wendy Toye
- Produced by: James Archibald
- Starring: Maurice Denham; Mischa Auer; Reginald Beckwith
- Cinematography: John Wilcox
- Edited by: Jean Barker
- Music by: Ron Grainer
- Production company: Shepperton Studios
- Release date: 1963
- Running time: 28 minutes
- Country: United Kingdom
- Language: English

The King's Breakfast is a 1963 British short musical family film directed by Wendy Toye and starring Maurice Denham, Mischa Auer, and Reginald Beckwith. It was written by Toye based on the 1924 poem The King's Breakfast by A.A. Milne.

== Plot ==
The king of an unnamed country is annoyed after he finds that there was no butter available for spreading on his morning toast. His staff try to find him some butter, which they eventually do.

== Production ==
After the failure of their chaotic and pointedly literal illustrating of the lyrics to the traditional Christmas carol "The Twelve Days" (1953), British film director and choreographer Wendy Toye and satirical-cartoonist-turned-set-designer Ronald Searle teamed up with composer Ron Grainer to create a film adaptation of the Milne poem. The result was a hyperactive 28-minute slapstick, ballet and mime featurette that was invited for screening at the 1963 Cannes Film Festival. The film's success led the producer Jack Le Vien to offer Grainer the soundtrack for his Winston Churchill documentary The Finest Hours (1964).

Colour photos taken on the set give a guide to the original appearance of the film. The stills photographer on the production was Douglas Webb, a former Dambusters raid veteran.

During production, the poem was expanded to other ideas and story lines relating to interpersonal relations within a castle environment. The characters of the Master of the King's Music, the magician, the chamberlain, the gym instructor, the serpent player, the musicians, and the Tweeney were all created for the film.

== Cast ==
- Maurice Denham as the King
- Mischa Auer as the Master of the King's Music
- Reginald Beckwith as magician
- Robert Flemyng as Chamberlain
- Lally Bowers as the Queen
- Warren Mitchell as gym instructor
- Maryon Lane as the dairymaid
- Richard Pearson as violinist
- Julian Orchard as cellist
- Jeremy Lloyd as clarinettist
- Bart Allison as serpent player
- Beryl Kaye as kitchenmaid
- Una Stubbs as the Tweeny
- Jean Telfer as the pantrymaid
- Richard Hearne as 1st footman
- Philip Locke as 2nd footman

== Reception ==
The Monthly Film Bulletin wrote: "A. A. Milne's simple rhyme about the King's determination to get a little butter on his bread is here expanded by Wendy Toye into a colourfully ornate ballet. ... The tone – firmly established through Ronald Searle's fairy-tale designs – is deliberately whimsical. Lally Bowers gives the Queen a pert, soubrettish quality and the cow – a lifesize puppet – has a coquettish pair of false eyelashes. A little too cute at times, but extremely enjoyable."

Kine Weekly wrote: "For looking and listening this is a delightful bit of comic fantasy. It is magnificently extravagant in costumes bright in colour, dainty in movement, and gay musically."
