= Sunnyside High School =

Sunnyside High School can refer to one of many secondary schools, including:

United States:

- Sunnyside High School (Fresno)
- Sunnyside High School (Tucson, Arizona)
- Sunnyside High School (Sunnyside, Washington)
