= The King's Breakfast (poem) =

Poem by A. A. Milne

"The King's Breakfast" is a poem by A. A. Milne, first published in When We Were Very Young (1924). It is about "a monarch who sulks when the cow refuses to provide milk." Damon Young calls it a "witty portrait of moping". The poem was made into a film in 1963.

The poem features an Alderney cow, a breed which became extinct in the 1940s.
