= Henriette Willebeek le Mair =

Dutch illustrator of children's books

Henriette Willebeek LeMair (April 23, 1889 in Rotterdam – March 15, 1966) was a Dutch illustrator of children's books.

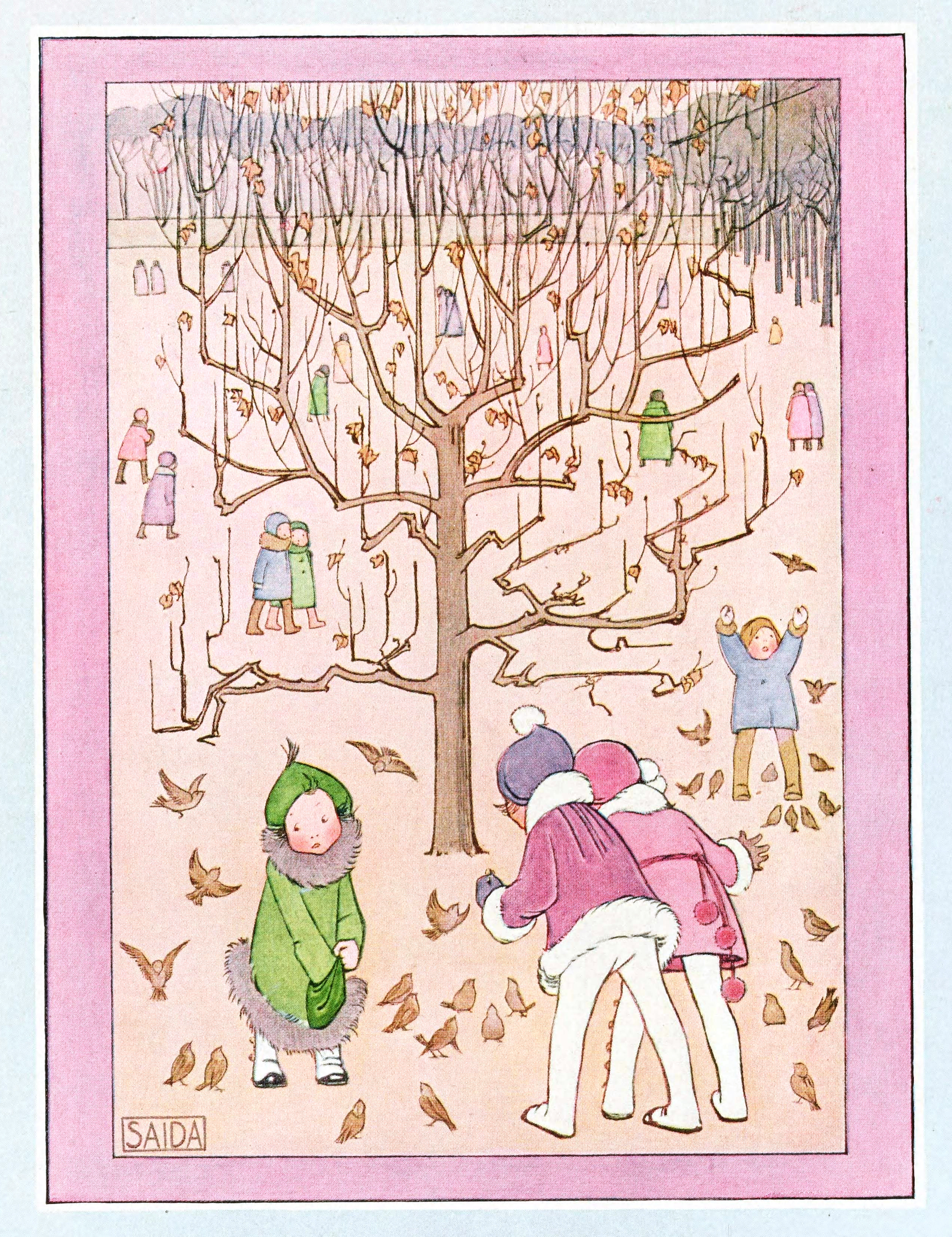
Babes in the Wools, by Saida, from a series of advertisements she illustrated for the American detergent brand Fab

== Career ==
The French illustrator Louis-Maurice Boutet de Monvel was an important influence on Le Mair's artistic development. When she was 15, her parents took her to visit him in Paris for advice, and she returned annually for further mentoring. As a result of his advice, she studied at the Rotterdam Academy of Art from 1909 to 1911 as well as taking private drawing lessons.

She first published illustrations in 1904, and a year later collaborated with her mother on a series of three books. As an illustrator, her most productive years were between 1911 and 1917. Her images appeared on postcards and children’s china as well as in books.

Le Mair worked in watercolor, a medium that showcased her delicate, detailed drawings with their muted flat color washes. She often used decorative cartouches shaped as ovals or rounded rectangles to set off her illustrations. Although she illustrated relatively few books, her work has always been highly regarded. One contemporary critic wrote, “Since the days of Kate Greenaway I know of no one who has caught so well the spirit of childhood as Miss Willebeek Le Mair.”

In her early twenties, she ran a nursery school, and she sometimes used her students as models.

In 1920 Le Mair married H.P. Baron van Tuyll van Serooskerken and adopted the name “Saida”. They both converted to the beliefs of Sufism, a religion of universal brotherhood and love, as taught by Murshid Inayat Khan, and spent their lives helping the poor and other charitable causes. They eventually settled in The Hague, Netherlands.

== Personal life ==
In 1920 she married Hubertus Paulus Baron van Tuyll van Serooskerken (1883–1958), the leader of the Dutch Sufis inspired by Inayat Khan, and adopted the name 'Saida'. They settled in The Hague, Netherlands.

== Books ==
- Premières Rondes Enfantines (1904)
- Our Old Nursery Rhymes (1911)
- Little Songs of Long Ago (1912)
- Schumann’s Piano Album of Children’s Pieces (1913)
- Grannie’s Little Rhyme Book (1913)
- Mother’s Little Rhyme Book (1913)
- Auntie’s Little Rhyme Book (1913)
- Nursie’s Little Rhyme Book (1913)
- Daddy’s Little Rhyme Book (1913)
- Baby’s Little Rhyme Book (1913)
- Elkin, R. H., The Children’s Corner (1914)
- What the Children Sing (1915)
- Little People (1915)
- Elkin, R. H., Old Dutch Nursery Rhymes (1917)
- Baby’s Diary (ca. 1925)
- Milne, A. A., A Gallery of Children (1925)
- Stevenson, Robert Louis, A Child’s Garden of Verses (1926)
- Khan, Noor Inayat, Twenty Jakarta Tales (1939)
- Christmas Carols for Young Children (1946)
- Four & Twenty Tailors (1975)
- Lemair Diary (1991)
- Little Green Rhyme Book (1995)
- Golden Days: A Book for Addresses and Days to Remember, by Henriette Willebeek Le Mair and Mair H. Le Willebeek (1997)
- A Children's Bedtime Book (2003)
- The Mother Goose Treasury (2003)
- Flower Garden of Inayat Khan by Inayat Khan by Inayat Khan (text) and H. Willebeek le Mair (illustrations) (2010)
- What the Children Sing: A Book of the Most Popular Rhymes & Games – Scholar's Choice Edition by Henriette Willebeek le Mair, Alfred Edward Moffat (2015) — 2 editions
