= A. A. Milne =

English writer (1882–1956)

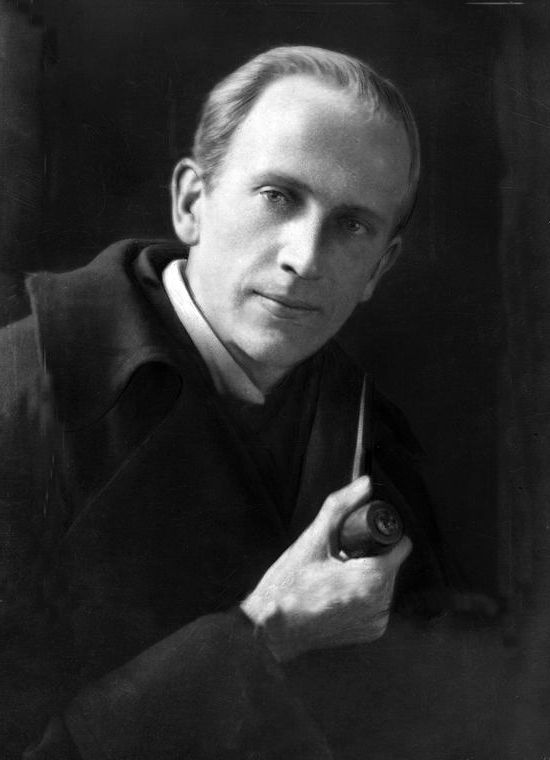
- Milne in 1922
- Born: Alan Alexander Milne; 18 January 1882; Kilburn, London, England
- Died: 31 January 1956 (aged 74); Hartfield, Sussex, England
- Education: University of Cambridge (BA)
- Occupations: Novelist; playwright; poet
- Spouse: Dorothy "Daphne" de Sélincourt (m. 1913)
- Children: Christopher Robin
- Relatives: Aubrey de Sélincourt (brother-in-law)
- Writing career
- Years active: 1906–1956
- Period: Interwar Britain
- Genre: Children's literature
- Notable work: Winnie-the-Pooh

Alan Alexander Milne (/mɪln/; 18 January 1882 – 31 January 1956) was an English writer best known for his books about the teddy bear Winnie-the-Pooh, as well as children's poetry. Milne was primarily a playwright before the huge success of Winnie-the-Pooh overshadowed his previous work. He served as a lieutenant in the Royal Warwickshire Regiment in the First World War and as a captain in the Home Guard in the Second World War.

Milne was the father of bookseller Christopher Robin Milne, upon whom the character Christopher Robin is based. It was during a visit to London Zoo, where Christopher became enamoured of the tame and amiable bear Winnipeg, that Milne was inspired to write the story of Winnie-the-Pooh for his son. Milne bequeathed the original manuscripts of the Winnie-the-Pooh stories to the Wren Library at Trinity College, Cambridge, his alma mater.

== Early life and military career ==
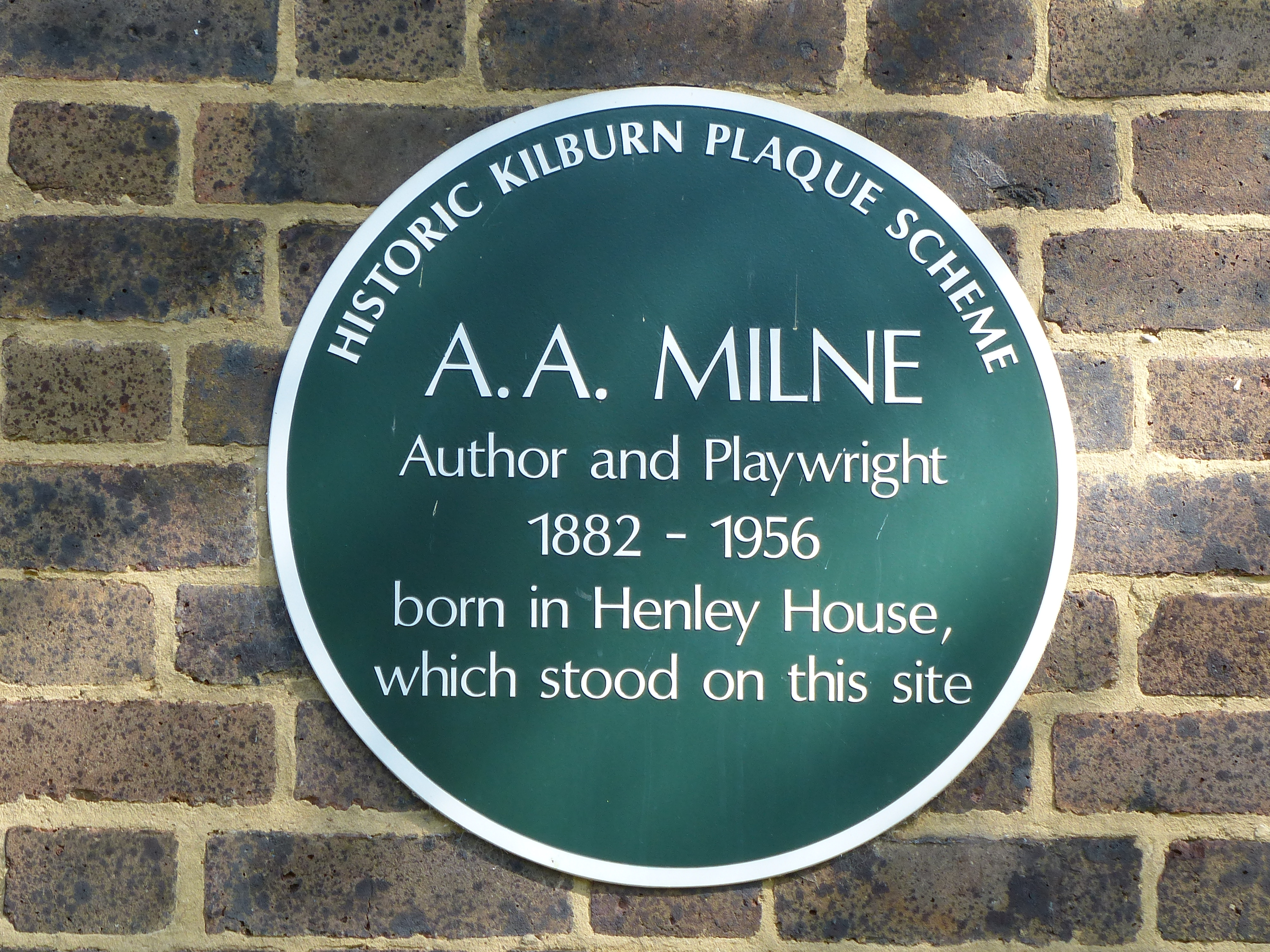
Plaque commemorating Milne's birthplace in Kilburn, London

Alan Alexander Milne was born in Kilburn, London, to John Vine Milne, who was born in Jamaica, and Sarah Marie Milne (née Heginbotham), on 18 January 1882. He grew up at Henley House School, 6/7 Mortimer Road (now Crescent), Kilburn, a small independent school run by his father. He taught himself to read at the age of two. One of his teachers was H. G. Wells, who taught there in 1889–90. Milne attended Westminster School and Trinity College, Cambridge, where he studied on a mathematics scholarship, graduating with a Bachelor of Arts in Mathematics in 1903, though he was always interested in writing. He edited and wrote for Granta, a student magazine. He collaborated with his brother Kenneth and their articles appeared over the initials AKM. Milne's work came to the attention of the leading British humour magazine Punch, where Milne was to become a contributor and later an assistant editor. Considered a talented cricket fielder, Milne played for two amateur teams that were largely composed of British writers: the Allahakbarries and the Authors XI. His teammates included fellow writers J. M. Barrie, Arthur Conan Doyle and P. G. Wodehouse.

Milne joined the British Army during World War I and served as an officer in the Royal Warwickshire Regiment. He was commissioned into the 4th Battalion, Royal Warwickshire Regiment, on 1 February 1915 as a second lieutenant (on probation). His commission was confirmed on 20 December 1915. He served on the Somme as a signals officer from July–November 1916, but caught trench fever and was invalided back to England. Having recuperated, he worked as a signals instructor, before being recruited into military intelligence to write propaganda articles for MI7 (b) between 1917 and 1918. He was discharged on 14 February 1919, and settled in Mallord Street, Chelsea. He relinquished his commission on 19 February 1920, retaining the rank of lieutenant.

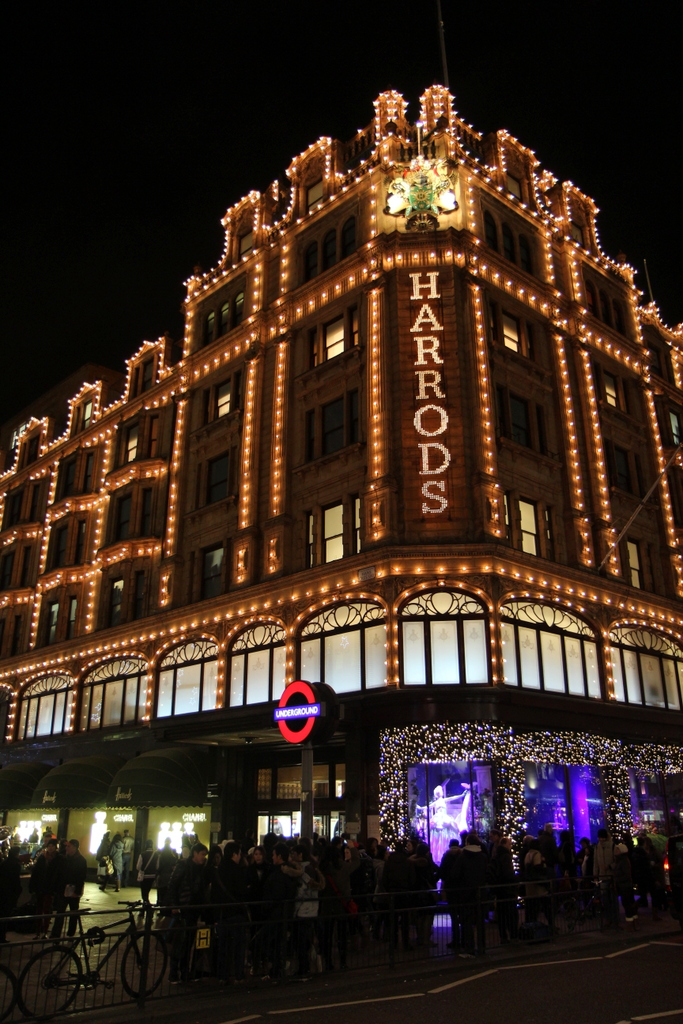
In 1921, Milne bought the 18-inch Alpha Farnell teddy bear for his son (who would name it Edward, then Winnie) from Harrods department store (pictured) in London.

After the war, he wrote a denunciation of war titled Peace with Honour (1934), which he retracted somewhat with 1940's War with Honour. During World War II, Milne was one of the most prominent critics of fellow English writer (and Authors XI cricket teammate) P. G. Wodehouse, who was captured at his country home in France by the Germans and imprisoned for a year. Wodehouse made radio broadcasts about his internment, which were broadcast from Berlin. Although the light-hearted broadcasts made fun of the Germans, Milne accused Wodehouse of committing an act of near treason by cooperating with his country's enemy. Wodehouse got some revenge on his former friend (e.g. in The Mating Season) by creating fatuous parodies of the Christopher Robin poems in some of his later stories, and claiming that Milne "was probably jealous of all other writers.... But I loved his stuff."

Milne married Dorothy "Daphne" de Sélincourt (1890–1971) in 1913 and their son Christopher Robin Milne was born in 1920. In 1925, Milne bought a country home, Cotchford Farm, in Hartfield, East Sussex.

During World War II, Milne was a captain in the British Home Guard in Hartfield and Forest Row, insisting on being plain "Mr. Milne" to the members of his platoon. He retired to the farm after a stroke and brain surgery in 1952 left him an invalid; and by August 1953, "he seemed very old and disenchanted." Milne died in January 1956, aged 74.

== Literary career ==
=== 1903 to 1925 ===
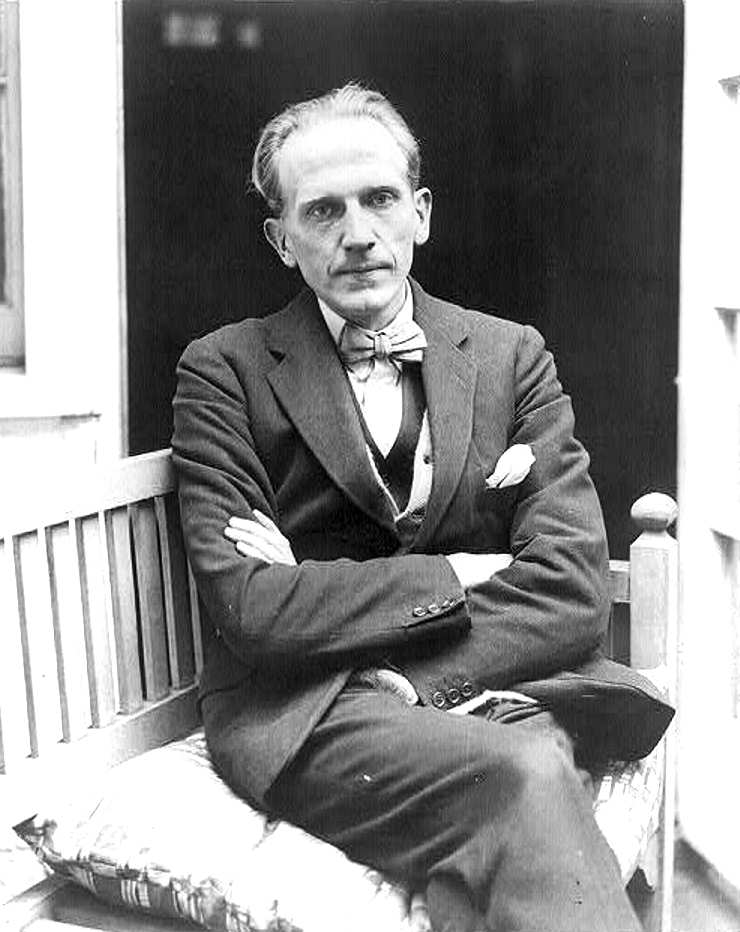
Milne in 1922

After graduating from Cambridge University in 1903, A. A. Milne contributed humorous verse and whimsical essays to Punch, joining the staff in 1906 and becoming an assistant editor.

During this period he published 18 plays and three novels, including the murder mystery The Red House Mystery (1922). His son was born in August 1920 and in 1924 Milne produced a collection of children's poems, When We Were Very Young, which were illustrated by Punch staff cartoonist E. H. Shepard. A collection of short stories for children A Gallery of Children, and other stories that became part of the Winnie-the-Pooh books, were first published in 1925.

Milne was an early screenwriter for the nascent British film industry, writing four stories filmed in 1920 for the company Minerva Films (founded in 1920 by the actor Leslie Howard and his friend and story editor Adrian Brunel). These were The Bump, starring Aubrey Smith; Twice Two; Five Pound Reward; and Bookworms. Some of these films survive in the archives of the British Film Institute. Milne had met Howard when the actor starred in Milne's play Mr Pim Passes By in London.

Looking back on this period (in 1926), Milne observed that when he told his agent that he was going to write a detective story, he was told that what the country wanted from a "Punch humorist" was a humorous story; when two years later he said he was writing nursery rhymes, his agent and publisher were convinced he should write another detective story; and after another two years, he was being told that writing a detective story would be in the worst of taste given the demand for children's books. He concluded that "the only excuse which I have yet discovered for writing anything is that I want to write it; and I should be as proud to be delivered of a Telephone Directory con amore as I should be ashamed to create a Blank Verse Tragedy at the bidding of others."

=== 1926 to 1928 ===
Milne with his son Christopher Robin and Pooh Bear, at Cotchford Farm, their home in Sussex. Photo by Howard Coster, 1926.

Milne is most famous for his two Pooh books about a boy named Christopher Robin after his son, Christopher Robin Milne (1920–1996), and various characters inspired by his son's stuffed animals, most notably the bear named Winnie-the-Pooh. Christopher Robin Milne's stuffed bear, originally named Edward, was renamed Winnie after a Canadian black bear named Winnie (after Winnipeg), which was used as a military mascot in World War I, and left to London Zoo during the war. "The Pooh" comes from a swan the young Milne named "Pooh". E. H. Shepard illustrated the original Pooh books, using his own son's teddy Growler ("a magnificent bear") as the model. The rest of Christopher Robin Milne's toys, Piglet, Eeyore, Kanga, Roo and Tigger, were incorporated into A. A. Milne's stories, and two more characters – Rabbit and Owl – were created by Milne's imagination. Christopher Robin Milne's own toys are now on display in New York where 750,000 people visit them every year. The fictional Hundred Acre Wood of the Pooh stories derives from Five Hundred Acre Wood in Ashdown Forest in East Sussex, South East England, where the Pooh stories were set. Milne lived on the northern edge of the forest at Cotchford Farm, 51.090°N 0.107°E, and took his son on walking trips there. E. H. Shepard drew on the landscapes of Ashdown Forest as inspiration for many of the illustrations he provided for the Pooh books. The adult Christopher Robin commented: "Pooh's Forest and Ashdown Forest are identical." Popular tourist locations at Ashdown Forest include: Galleon's Lap, The Enchanted Place, the Heffalump Trap and Lone Pine, Eeyore's Sad and Gloomy Place, and the wooden Pooh Bridge where Pooh and Piglet invented Poohsticks.

Not yet known as Pooh, he made his first appearance in a poem, "Teddy Bear", published in Punch magazine in February 1924 and republished that year in When We Were Very Young. Pooh first appeared in the London Evening News on Christmas Eve, 1925, in a story called "The Wrong Sort of Bees". Winnie-the-Pooh was published in 1926, followed by The House at Pooh Corner in 1928. A second collection of nursery rhymes, Now We Are Six, was published in 1927. All four books were illustrated by E. H. Shepard. Milne also published four plays in this period. He also "gallantly stepped forward" to contribute a quarter of the costs of dramatising P. G. Wodehouse's A Damsel in Distress. The World of Pooh won the Lewis Carroll Shelf Award in 1958.

=== 1929 onward ===
The success of his children's books was to become a source of considerable annoyance to Milne, whose self-avowed aim was to write whatever he pleased and who had, until then, found a ready audience for each change of direction: he had freed pre-war Punch from its ponderous facetiousness; he had made a considerable reputation as a playwright (like his idol J. M. Barrie) on both sides of the Atlantic; he had produced a witty piece of detective writing in The Red House Mystery (although this was severely criticised by Raymond Chandler for the implausibility of its plot in his essay The Simple Art of Murder in the eponymous collection that appeared in 1950). But once Milne had, in his own words, "said goodbye to all that in 70,000 words" (the approximate length of his four principal children's books), he had no intention of producing any reworkings lacking in originality, given that one of the sources of inspiration, his son, was growing older.

Another reason Milne stopped writing children's books, and especially about Winnie-the-Pooh, was that he felt "amazement and disgust" over the immense fame his son was exposed to, and said that "I feel that the legal Christopher Robin has already had more publicity than I want for him. I do not want CR Milne to ever wish that his name were Charles Robert."

In his literary home, Punch, where the When We Were Very Young verses first appeared, Methuen continued to publish whatever Milne wrote, including the long poem "The Norman Church" and an assembly of articles entitled Year In, Year Out (which Milne likened to a benefit night for the author).

In 1929, Milne adapted Kenneth Grahame's novel The Wind in the Willows for the stage as Toad of Toad Hall. The title was an implicit admission that such chapters as Chapter 7, "The Piper at the Gates of Dawn," could not survive translation to the theatre. A special introduction written by Milne is included in some editions of Grahame's novel. It was first performed at the Playhouse Theatre, Liverpool, on 21 December 1929 before it made its West End debut the following year at the Lyric Theatre on 17 December 1930. The play was revived in the West End from 1931 to 1935, and since the 1960s there have been West End revivals during the Christmas season; actors who have performed in the play include Judi Dench and Ian McKellen.

Milne and his wife became estranged from their son, who came to resent what he saw as his father's exploitation of his childhood and came to hate the books that had thrust him into the public eye. Christopher's marriage to his first cousin, Lesley de Sélincourt, distanced him still further from his parents – Lesley's father and Christopher's mother had not spoken to each other for 30 years.

== Death and legacy ==
=== Commemoration ===
I suppose that every one of us hopes secretly for immortality; to leave, I mean, a name behind him which will live forever in this world, whatever he may be doing, himself, in the next.

— A. A. Milne.

Milne died at his home in Hartfield, Sussex, on 31 January 1956, 13 days after his 74th birthday. A memorial service took place on 10 February at All Hallows-by-the-Tower church in London.

The rights to A. A. Milne's Pooh books were left to four beneficiaries: his family, the Royal Literary Fund, Westminster School and the Garrick Club. After Milne's death in 1956, his widow sold her rights to the Pooh characters to Stephen Slesinger, whose widow sold the rights after Slesinger's death to Walt Disney Productions, which has made many Pooh cartoon movies, a Disney Channel television show, as well as Pooh-related merchandise. In 2001, the other beneficiaries sold their interest in the estate to the Disney Corporation for $350m. Previously, Disney had been paying twice-yearly royalties to these beneficiaries. The estate of E. H. Shepard also received a sum in the deal. The UK copyright on the text of the original Winnie the Pooh books expires on 1 January 2027; at the beginning of the year after the 70th anniversary of the author's death (PMA-70), and has already expired in those countries with a PMA-60 rule. This applies to all of Milne's works except those first published posthumously. The illustrations in the Pooh books will remain under copyright until the same amount of time after the illustrator's death has passed; in the UK, this will be 1 January 2047.

In the US, copyright on the four children's books (including the illustrations) expired 95 years after publication of each of the books. Specifically: copyright on the book When We Were Very Young expired in 2020; copyright on the book Winnie-the-Pooh expired in 2022; copyright on the book Now We Are Six expired in 2023; and copyright on the book The House at Pooh Corner expired in 2024.

In 2008, a collection of original illustrations featuring Winnie-the-Pooh and his animal friends sold for more than £1.2 million at auction at Sotheby's, London. Forbes magazine ranked Winnie the Pooh the most valuable fictional character in 2002; Winnie the Pooh merchandising products alone had annual sales of more than $5.9 billion. In 2005, Winnie the Pooh generated $6 billion, a figure surpassed only by Mickey Mouse.

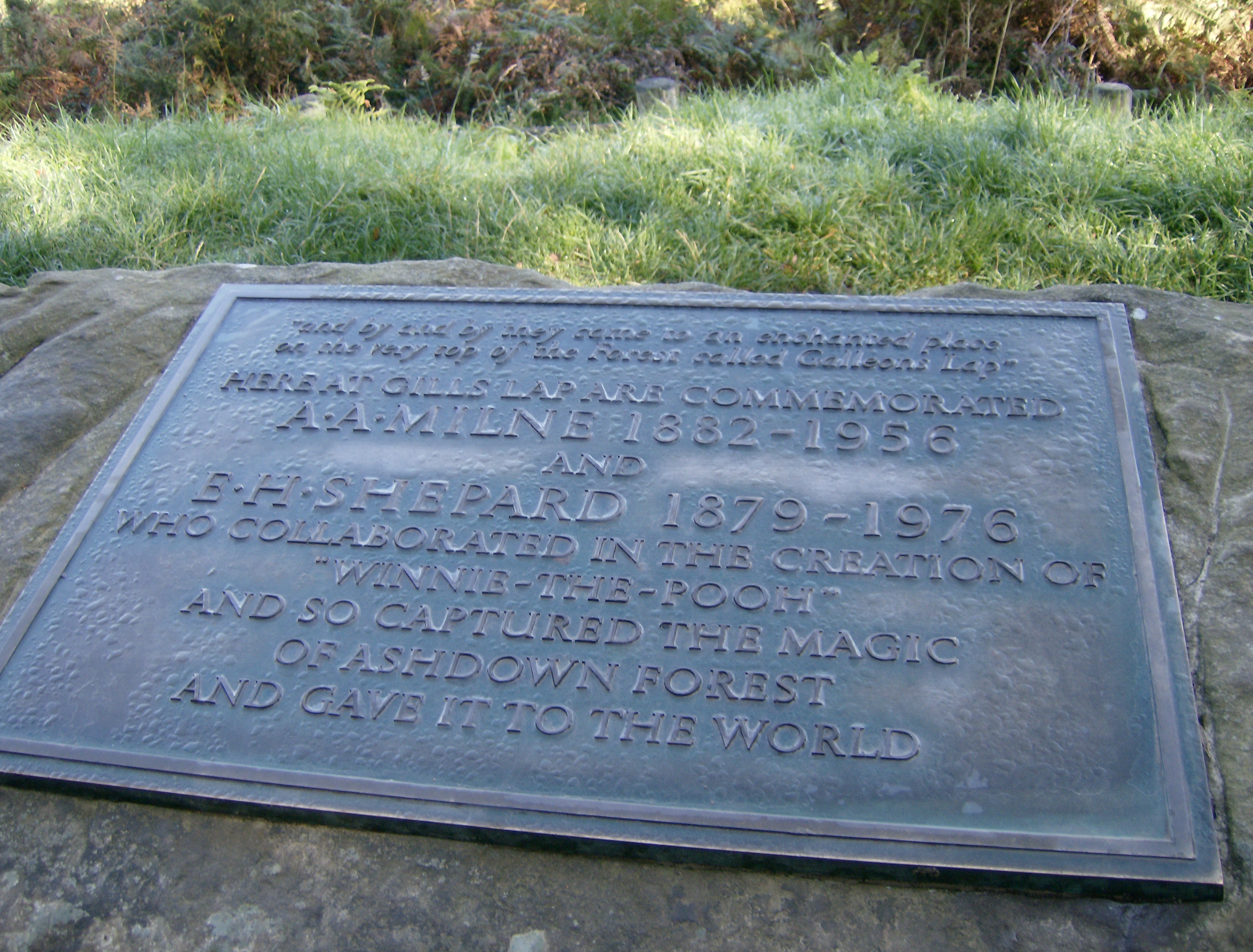
A. A. Milne and E. H. Shepard memorial plaque at Ashdown Forest, East Sussex, south east England. It overlooks Five Hundred Acre Wood, the setting for Winnie-the-Pooh.

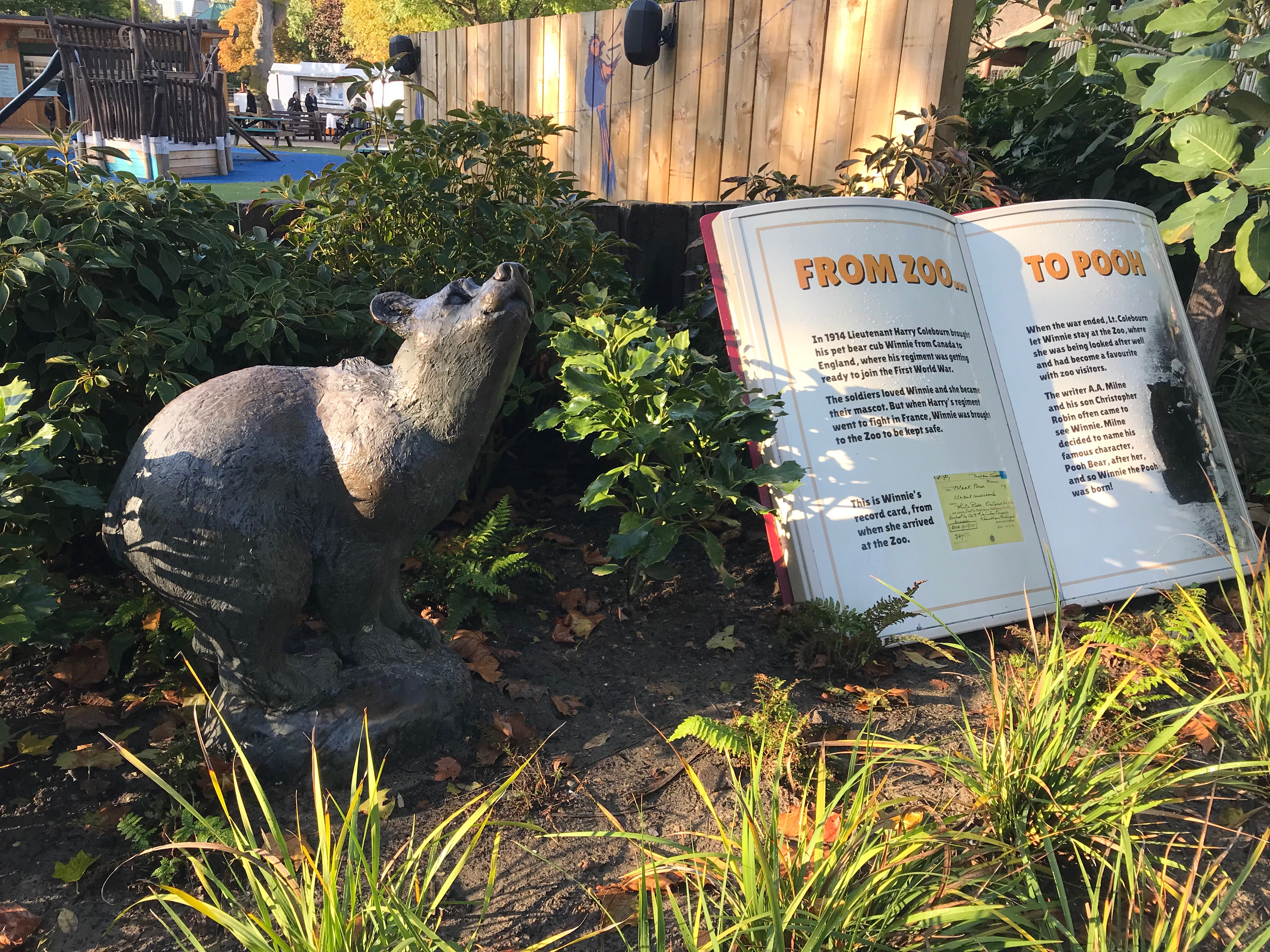
This sculpture at London Zoo marks where Milne took his son Christopher Robin to see the amiable bear that inspired Milne to write the story.

A memorial plaque in Ashdown Forest, unveiled by Christopher Robin in 1979, commemorates the work of A. A. Milne and Shepard in creating the world of Pooh. The inscription states they "captured the magic of Ashdown Forest, and gave it to the world". Milne once wrote of Ashdown Forest: "In that enchanted place on the top of the forest a little boy and his bear will always be playing."

In 2003, Winnie-the-Pooh was ranked number 7 on the BBC's The Big Read poll which determined the UK's "best-loved novels". In 2006, Winnie-the-Pooh received a star on the Hollywood Walk of Fame, marking the 80th birthday of Milne's creation.

Marking the 90th anniversary of Milne's creation of the character, and the 90th birthday of Queen Elizabeth II, Winnie-the-Pooh Meets the Queen (2016) sees Pooh meet the Queen at Buckingham Palace. The illustrated and audio adventure is narrated by the actor Jim Broadbent. Also in 2016, a new character, a Penguin, was unveiled in The Best Bear in All the World, which was inspired by a long-lost photograph of Milne and his son Christopher with a toy penguin.

An exhibition entitled Winnie-the-Pooh: Exploring a Classic appeared at the Victoria and Albert Museum in London from 9 December 2017 to 8 April 2018.

The composer Harold Fraser-Simson, a near neighbour, produced six books of Milne songs between 1924 and 1932. The poems have been parodied many times, including in the books When We Were Rather Older and Now We Are Sixty. The 1963 film The King's Breakfast was based on Milne's poem of the same name.

Milne has been portrayed in television and film. Domhnall Gleeson plays him in Goodbye Christopher Robin, a 2017 biographical drama film. In the 2018 fantasy film Christopher Robin, an extension of the Disney Winnie the Pooh franchise, Tristan Sturrock plays Milne, and filming took place at Ashdown Forest.

An elementary school in Houston, Texas, operated by the Houston Independent School District (HISD), is named after Milne. The school, A. A. Milne Elementary School in Brays Oaks, opened in 1991.

== Archive ==
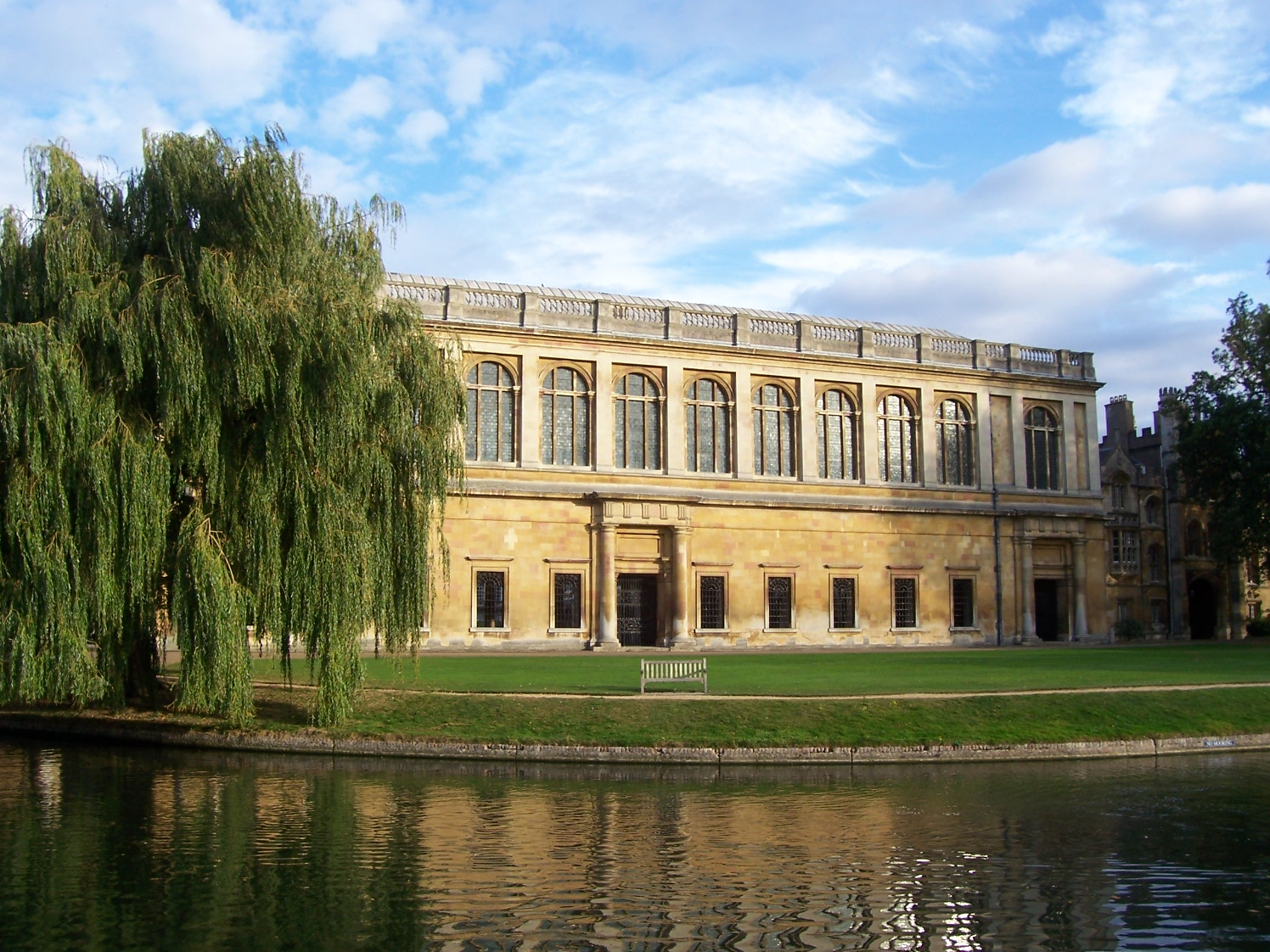
Milne bequeathed his Winnie-the-Pooh manuscripts to the Wren Library (pictured) at Trinity College, Cambridge

The original manuscripts for Winnie-the-Pooh and The House at Pooh Corner are archived at Trinity College Library, Cambridge.

The bulk of A. A. Milne's papers are housed at the Harry Ransom Center at the University of Texas at Austin. The collection, established at the centre in 1964, consists of manuscript drafts and fragments for over 150 of Milne's works, as well as correspondence, legal documents, genealogical records, and some personal effects. The library division holds several books formerly belonging to Milne and his wife Dorothy. The center also has small collections of correspondence from Christopher Robin Milne and Milne's frequent illustrator E. H. Shepard.

== Religious views ==
Milne did not speak out much on the subject of religion, although he used religious terms to explain his decision, while remaining a pacifist, to join the British Home Guard. He wrote: "In fighting Hitler we are truly fighting the Devil, the Anti-Christ ... Hitler was a crusader against God."

His best known comment on the subject was recalled on his death:

The Old Testament is responsible for more atheism, agnosticism, disbelief – call it what you will – than any book ever written; it has emptied more churches than all the counter-attractions of cinema, motor bicycle and golf course.

He wrote in the poem "Explained":

Elizabeth Ann
Said to her Nan:
"Please will you tell me how God began?
Somebody must have made Him. So
Who could it be, 'cos I want to know?"

He also wrote in the poem "Vespers":

"Oh! Thank you, God, for a lovely day.
And what was the other I had to say?
I said "Bless Daddy," so what can it be?
Oh! Now I remember it. God bless Me."

== Works ==
=== Novels ===
- Lovers in London (1905. Some consider this more of a short story collection; Milne did not like it and considered The Day's Play as his first book.)
- Once on a Time (1917)
- Mr. Pim (1921) (A novelisation of his 1919 play Mr. Pim Passes By)
- The Red House Mystery (1922). Serialised: London (Daily News), serialised daily from 3 to 28 August 1921
- Two People (1931) (Inside jacket claims this is Milne's first attempt at a novel.)
- Four Days' Wonder (1933)
- Chloe Marr (1946)

=== Non-fiction ===
- Peace With Honour (1934)
- It's Too Late Now: The Autobiography of a Writer (1939)
- War With Honour (1940)
- War Aims Unlimited (1941)
- Year In, Year Out (1952) (illustrated by E. H. Shepard)

==== Punch articles ====
- The Day's Play (1910)
- The Holiday Round (1912)
- Once a Week (1914)
- The Sunny Side (1921)
- Those Were the Days (1929) [The four volumes above, compiled]

=== Newspaper articles and book introductions ===
- The Chronicles of Clovis by "Saki" (1911) [Introduction to]
- Not That It Matters (1919)
- If I May (1920)
- By Way of Introduction (1929)
- Women and Children First!. John Bull, 10 November 1934
- It Depends on the Book (1943, in September issue of Red Cross Newspaper The Prisoner of War)

=== Story collections for children ===
- A Gallery of Children (1925)
- Winnie-the-Pooh (1926) (illustrated by Ernest H. Shepard)
- The House at Pooh Corner (1928) (illustrated by E. H. Shepard)
- Short Stories

=== Poetry collections for children ===
- When We Were Very Young (1924) (illustrated by E. H. Shepard)
- Now We Are Six (1927) (illustrated by E. H. Shepard)

=== Story collections ===
- The Secret and other stories (1929)
- The Birthday Party (1948)
- A Table Near the Band (1950)

=== Poetry ===
- When We Were Very Young (1924) (illustrated by E. H. Shepard)
- For the Luncheon Interval (1925) [poems from Punch]
- Now We Are Six (1927) (illustrated by E. H. Shepard)
- Behind the Lines (1940)
- The Norman Church (1948)

=== Screenplays and plays ===
- Wurzel-Flummery (1917)
- Belinda (1918)
- The Boy Comes Home (1918)
- Make-Believe (1918) (children's play)
- The Camberley Triangle (1919)
- Mr. Pim Passes By (1919)
- The Red Feathers (1920)
- The Romantic Age (1920)
- The Stepmother (1920)
- The Truth About Blayds (1920)
- The Bump (1920, Minerva Films), starring C. Aubrey Smith and Faith Celli
- Twice Two (1920, Minerva Films)
- Five Pound Reward (1920, Minerva Films)
- Bookworms (1920, Minerva Films)
- The Great Broxopp (1921)
- The Dover Road (1921)
- The Lucky One (1922)
- The Truth About Blayds (1922)
- The Artist: A Duologue (1923)
- Give Me Yesterday (1923) (a.k.a. Success in the UK)
- Ariadne (1924)
- The Man in the Bowler Hat: A Terribly Exciting Affair (1924)
- To Have the Honour (1924)
- Portrait of a Gentleman in Slippers (1926)
- Success (1926)
- Miss Marlow at Play (1927)
- Winnie the Pooh. Written specially by Milne for a 'Winnie the Pooh Party' in aid of the National Mother-Saving Campaign, and performed once at Seaford House on 17 March 1928
- The Fourth Wall or The Perfect Alibi (1928) (later adapted for the film Birds of Prey (1930), directed by Basil Dean)
- The Ivory Door (1929)
- Toad of Toad Hall (1929) (adaptation of The Wind in the Willows)
- Michael and Mary (1930)
- Other People's Lives (1933) (a.k.a. They Don't Mean Any Harm)
- Miss Elizabeth Bennet (1936) [based on Pride and Prejudice]
- Sarah Simple (1937)
- Gentleman Unknown (1938)
- The General Takes Off His Helmet (1939) in The Queen's Book of the Red Cross
- The Ugly Duckling (1941)
- Before the Flood (1951).

=== Marvellous Milne Reprints ===
Between August 2023 and February 2024, Farrago Books reprinted A. A. Milne's classic works for grownups, including material not previous collected/published. These were available both in paperback and as ebooks.

1. Mr Pim (originally published 1921) published 10 August 2023, ISBN 9781788424516 (p/b); ISBN 9781788424523 (ebook)
2. Two People (originally published 1931) published 7 September 2023, ISBN 9781788424530 (p/b); ISBN 9781788424547 (ebook)
3. Four Days' Wonder (originally published 1933) published 26 October 2023, ISBN 9781788424554 (p/b); ISBN 9781788424561 (ebook)
4. Chloe Marr (originally published 1946) published 16 November 2023, ISBN 9781788424578 (p/b); ISBN 9781788424585 (ebook)
5. The Rabbits (originally published 6 June 1909 - 15 April 1914 in Punch, portions subsequently appearing in The Day's Play (1910), The Holiday Round (1912), Once a Week (1914) and The Sunny Side (1921)) published 29 February 2024, ISBN 9781788424592 (p/b); ISBN 9781788424608 (ebook)
  This was the first time that the entire series was published in a collection in its entirety (the portions in the publications listed did not include all of the stories between them) apart from a PDF/EPUB-only publication by Jonathan Bogart, available on Gumroad and Patreon

Also included were the following books, although these were not part of the 'numbered' Marvelous Milne Collection:

- It's Too Late Now: The Autobiography of a Writer (originally published 1939), published 27 July 2023, ISBN 9780715655047 (p/b); ISBN 9780715655054 (ebook)
- The Complete Short Stories of A. A. Milne (the first time published in one book), published 29 February 2024, ISBN 9781788424493 (p/b); ISBN 9781788424509 (ebook); ISBN 9781788424745 (audiobook)
  Portions of this work appeared, sometimes in different form, in different publications between 1914 and 1951. Four stories were published in this collection for the first time, indicated below by a dagger †. An introduction was written by Gyles Brandreth.

- The Woman (1914)
- Rosemary for Remembrance (1915)
- Mullins (1918)
- Bad Lord Blight (1920)
- The Return (1922)
- The End of the Peer of Wotherspoon (1923)
- The Green Door (1925)
- The Secret (1926)
- In Vino Veritas (1943)
- The Lost Diary of Shakespeare (1946)
- The Birthday Party (1948)
- The Dear, Dead Past (1948)
- A.V. and R.V. (1948)
- Anne-Marie (1948)
- Breitenstein (1948)
- C.O.D. (1948)
- Dear Old George (1948)
- The General Takes off his Helmet (1948)
- Luck Nothing (1948)
- Night at the Aldwinckles (1948)
- Spring Song (1948)
- Tristram (1948)
- A Table Near the Band (1949)
- The Three Dreams of Mr Findlater (1949)
- The Prettiest Girl in the Room (1949)
- Before the Flood (1949)
- A Man Greatly Beloved (1950)
- The Rise and Fall of Mortimer Scrivens (1950)
- Portrait of Lydia (1950)
- The Balcony (1950)
- Christmas Party (1950)
- Murder at Eleven (1950)
- A Rattling Good Yarn (1950)
- The River (1950)
- The Wibberley Touch (1950)
- A Savage Game (1950)
- Bread Upon the Waters (1950)
- Call me Sally (1953)
- † Happy Ever After (Undated)
- † The Southey Manuscript (Undated)
- † In It Together (fragment) (Undated)
- † My Dear Vincent (fragment) (Undated)
