= The Sunny Side =

The Sunny Side is a collection of short stories and essays by A. A. Milne. Though Milne is best known for his classic children's books, he also wrote extensively for adults, most notably in Punch, to which he was a contributor and later assistant editor. The Sunny Side collects his columns for Punch, which include poems, essays and short stories, from 1912 to 1920.
