= Harold Fraser-Simson =

British composer (1872–1944)

Harold Fraser-Simson (15 August 1872 – 19 January 1944) was an English composer of light music, including songs and the scores to musical comedies. His most famous musical was the World War I hit The Maid of the Mountains, and he later set numerous children's poems to music, especially those of A. A. Milne.

== Early life and education ==
Fraser-Simson was born on 15 August 1872 in London, the second child and eldest son of an East Indies merchant, Arthur Theodore Simson and his wife, Jane Anne Catherine née Fraser, of Reelig, Scotland. He was educated at Charterhouse School and Dulwich College, then at King's College London and in France. As a young man he joined a ship-owning firm in London before turning to music as a full-time occupation in his early forties.

== Career ==
=== Musical comedies ===
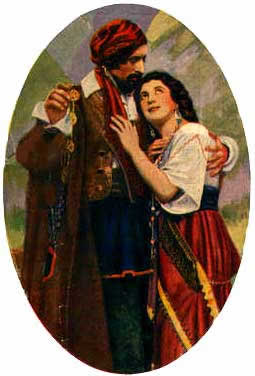
José Collins in The Maid of the Mountains

Fraser-Simson published his first song, "My Sweet Sweeting", in 1907. His first theatre score was for the 1911 musical Bonita, with a libretto by Walter Wadham Peacock, which played at Queen's Theatre.

Fraser-Simson's biggest success was the score for the operetta The Maid of the Mountains, which played at Daly's Theatre in London in 1917 and finally closed after 1,352 performances. This was, at the time, a phenomenal run second only to that of Chu Chin Chow. Several songs from this work (not all of them by Fraser-Simson) have remained "standards" ever since. Fraser-Simson's best-known songs for this show included "Love will Find a Way", "Farewell" and "Husbands and Wives". The Maid of the Mountains has been frequently revived by both professional and amateur groups, and was filmed in 1932. It was one of the three most important musical hits of the London stage during World War I (the other two being a revue, The Bing Boys Are Here, and the musical Chu Chin Chow). Music or scenes from all of these have been included as background in many films set in this period, and they remain intensely evocative of the "Great War" years. Audiences wanted light and uplifting entertainment during the war, and these shows delivered it.

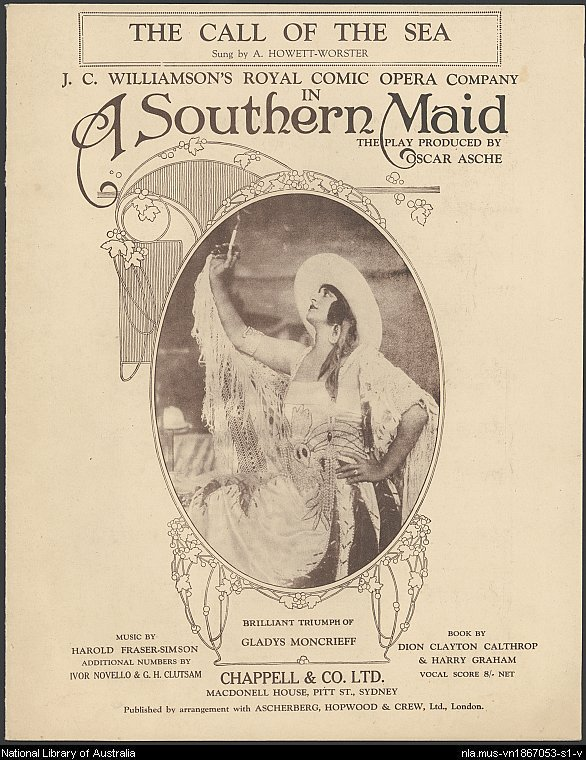
Sheet music from the Australian production

After The Maid of the Mountains, Fraser-Simson wrote music for more operettas and musicals, including A Southern Maid (premiered in Manchester in 1917 and produced at Daly's in London after Maid closed in 1920); Our Peg (1919, with a libretto by Harry Graham and Edward Knoblock at Prince's Theatre); Missy Jo (1921 touring); Head over Heels (Adelphi Theatre, 1923); Our Nell (1924, Lyric Theatre – a rewrite of Our Peg replacing Peg Woffington as principal character with Nell Gwynne), The Street Singer, based on the 1912 film of the same name (1924, 360 performances at the Lyric, starring Phyllis Dare); and Betty in Mayfair (1925, Adelphi Theatre).

Fraser-Simson's music tended towards the old-fashioned European romantic songs, in contrast to the ragtime, jazz and other American dance music that began to be used in musicals during World War I. His other stage works include a ballet, Venetian Wedding (1926), and incidental music for The Nightingale and the Rose (1927).

=== Children's songs and later career ===
Fraser-Simson is also known for his many settings of children's verse by A. A. Milne and Kenneth Grahame, including the music for a children's play by Milne, based on Grahame's The Wind in the Willows, entitled Toad of Toad Hall (1929), which was successful and enjoyed many revivals and adaptations. His settings of Milne's verse include a children's song cycle The Hums of Pooh, based on verses from Winnie-the-Pooh and The House at Pooh Corner. This was included in Julian Slade's 1970 adaptation of Winnie-the-Pooh. Fraser-Simson published six volumes of songs setting verses from Milne's When We Were Very Young, including "Christopher Robin Is Saying His Prayers". A number were first recorded for HMV in 1926 by George Baker, accompanied by the composer, and later again accompanied by Gerald Moore in 1930. His other songs included the collection Teddy Bear and Other Songs and songs from Alice in Wonderland, which were published in 1932 and recorded by Baker and Moore the same year. Baker later recalled Fraser-Simson as "a very polite, retiring man, looking more like a businessman than a composer of successful musicals."

== Personal life and death ==
Fraser-Simson married May Frances, née Bucknall, in 1897, with whom he had a daughter, Lilian Frances. He married his second wife, (Anna) Cicely Devenish, in 1919. In later years, he lived the life of a country squire at Dalcross Castle, a home that he bought in Scotland. He was an avid sportsman, enjoying golf, tennis, shooting and fishing.

Fraser-Simson died on 19 January 1944, aged 71, at a nursing home in Inverness, Scotland, following a fall on a stone staircase at his home in nearby Croy, Highland.
