= Sunnyside, Clackamas County, Oregon =

Unincorporated community in the state of Oregon, United States

Coordinates: 45°25′55″N 122°33′26″W

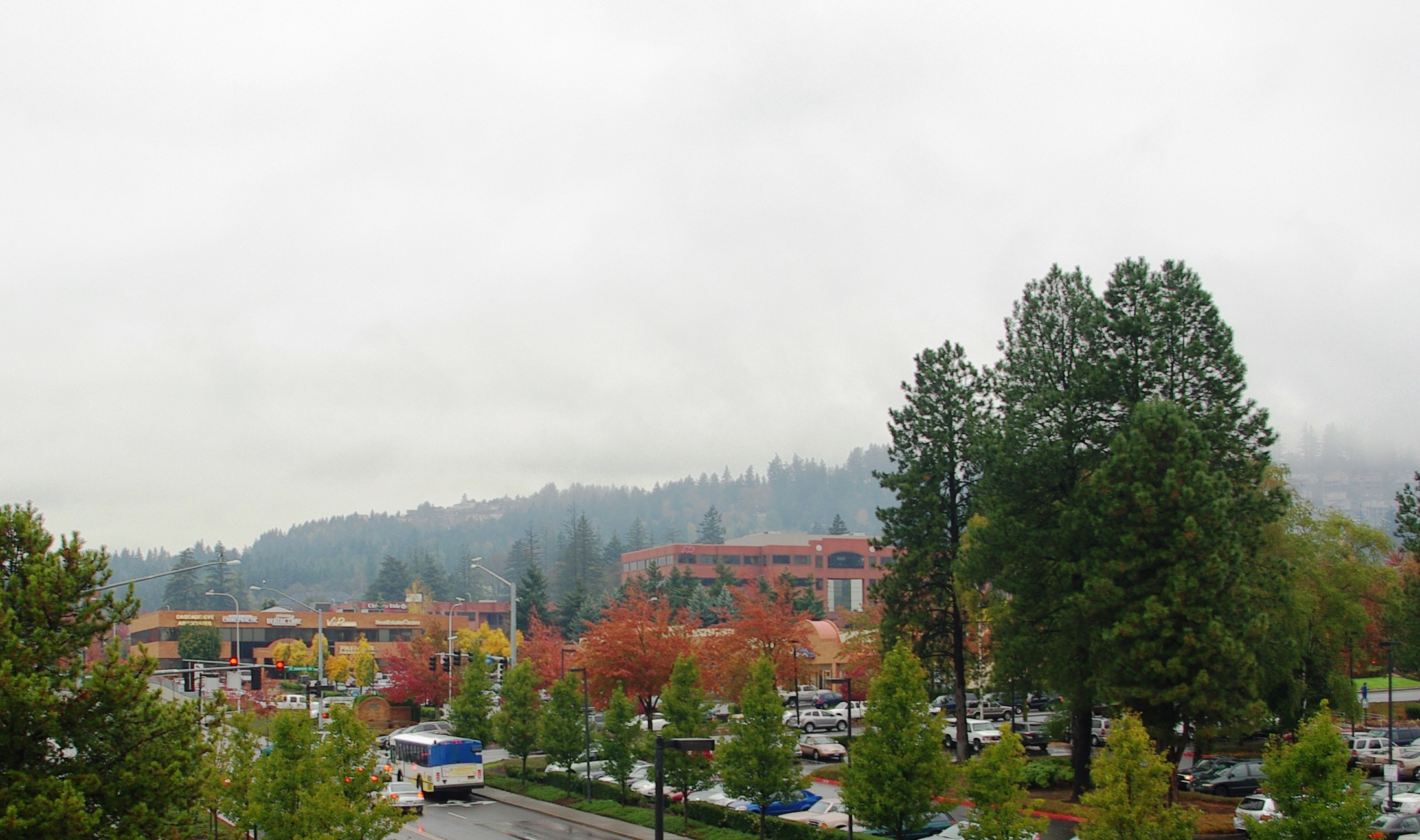
Sunnyside near Sunnyside Road with Mt. Scott in background to the right

Sunnyside is a former census-designated place in Clackamas County in the U.S. state of Oregon. Located in the Portland metropolitan area along Interstate 205, the population was 6,791 at the 2000 census. The area was not recorded as a distinct place for the 2010 census.

== Geography ==
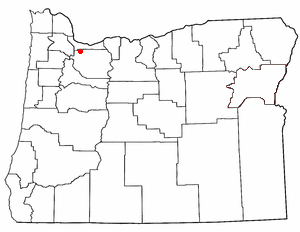
Location of Sunnyside, Oregon

According to the United States Census Bureau, the CDP had a total area of 2.6 square miles (6.7 km^{2}), all land.

== Demographics ==
As of the census of 2000, there were 6,791 people, 2,751 households, and 1,735 families residing in the CDP. The population density was 2,620.9 inhabitants per square mile (1,011.9/km^{2}). There were 2,900 housing units at an average density of 1,119.2 per square mile (432.1/km^{2}). The racial makeup of the CDP was 84.91% White, 1.38% African American, 0.69% Native American, 7.05% Asian, 0.31% Pacific Islander, 2.12% from other races, and 3.53% from two or more races. Hispanic or Latino of any race were 4.56% of the population.

There were 2,751 households, out of which 30.9% had children under the age of 18 living with them, 49.1% were married couples living together, 10.4% had a female householder with no husband present, and 36.9% were non-families. 25.2% of all households were made up of individuals, and 2.8% had someone living alone who was 65 years of age or older. The average household size was 2.47 and the average family size was 3.01.

In the CDP, the population was spread out, with 23.5% under the age of 18, 15.3% from 18 to 24, 31.3% from 25 to 44, 23.1% from 45 to 64, and 6.7% who were 65 years of age or older. The median age was 31 years. For every 100 females, there were 98.1 males. For every 100 females age 18 and over, there were 99.9 males.

The median income for a household in the CDP was $45,395, and the median income for a family was $52,500. Males had a median income of $37,435 versus $31,284 for females. The per capita income for the CDP was $25,276. About 8.3% of families and 8.5% of the population were below the poverty line, including 10.0% of those under age 18 and 7.0% of those age 65 or over.

== See also ==
- Clackamas Town Center
- MAX Green Line
