= Ann Major =

American novelist (born 1946)

Margaret Major Cleaves
- Born: Margaret Major; February 13, 1946 (age 80); Texas, United States
- Education: Del Mar College; University of Texas at Austin (BA)
- Occupation: Novelist
- Writing career
- Pen name: Ann Major, Margaret Major Cleaves
- Period: 1980–present
- Genre: Romance
- Website: annmajor.com

Margaret Major Cleaves (born February 13, 1946) is an author of over 45 romance novels since 1980, writing under her real name and under the pseudonym Ann Major.

She is a founding member of the Romance Writers of America and the co-author of the article "The Contemporary Light Romance" which has been collected in the book Writing and Selling the Romance Novel.

== Biography ==
Margaret Major was born February 13, 1946, in Texas, United States.

Major attended Del Mar College, the University of the Americas in Mexico City, and the University of Texas at Austin from which she received a B.A. in English and Spanish. She taught school for two years before going on to receive her M.A. in English and Spanish from Texas A & I University. She has studied music at the university level and speaks three languages: English, Spanish and French. Major married and began writing after her first child was born. She sold her first novel six years later.

She is a founding board member of the Romance Writers of America and the co-author of the article "The Contemporary Light Romance" which has been collected in the book Writing and Selling the Romance Novel. She lives with her husband in Corpus Christi, Texas.

== Bibliography ==
=== As Margaret Major Cleaves ===
==== Single novels ====
- Midnight Surrender (1980)
- Wild Enough for Willa (1980)*
- Wild Lady (1981)*
- A Touch of Fire (1982)*
- Dream Come True: Florida (1982)*
- Meant to be (1982)*
- Love Me Again (1983)*
- Seize the Moment (1984)*
- The Wrong Man (1984)*
- Golden Man (1985)*
  - Reedited as Ann Major*

=== As Ann Major ===
==== Single novels ====
- Brand of Diamonds (1983)
- Dazzle (1985)
- Beyond Love (1985)
- In Every Stranger's Face (1986)
- What This Passion Means (1987)
- The Fairy Tale Girl (1987)
- A Knight in Tarnished Armor (1991)
- Married to the Enemy (1992)
- The Accidental Bridegroom (1994)
- A Cowboy Christmas (1995)
- The Accidental Bodyguard (1996)
- Love Me True (1999)
- Inseparable (1999)
- Midnight Fantasy (2000)
- Cowboy Fantasy (2001)
- A Cowboy and a Gentleman (2002)
- Marry a Man Who Will Dance (2002)
- The Hot Ladies Murder Club (2003)
- The Secret Lives Of Doctors' Wives (2006)
- The Amalfi Bride (2007)
- Sold Into Marriage (2007)

==== Wild Series ====
1. Wild Honey (1993)
2. Wild Midnight (1993)
3. Wild Innocence (1994)

==== Children of Destiny Series ====
1. Passion's Child (1988)
2. Destiny's Child (1988)
3. Night Child (1988)
4. Wilderness Child (1989)
5. Scandal's Child (1990)
6. The Goodbye Child (1991)
7. Nobody's Child (1997)
8. Secret Child (1998)

==== The Girls with the Golden Love Series ====
1. The Girl with the Golden Spurs (2004)
2. The Girl with the Golden Gun (2005)

==== Lone Star Country Club Series Multi-Author ====
  - Shameless (2003)

==== Fortunes of Texas: Reunion Series Multi-Author ====
  - Cowboy at Midnight (2005)

==== Collections ====
- Silhouette Christmas Stories 1990 (1990)
- Silhouette Christmas Stories 1992 (1992)
- Dazzled! (1999
- Getting Hitched Vol. 8: Marriage Diamond Style; Married to the Enemy; The Perfect Husband; I Thee Wed (1999))
- Fortunes of Texas / Reunion / Cowboy at Midnight (2006)

==== Omnibus in collaboration ====
- Wild Lady / Circumstantial Evidence / Island on the Hill (1990) (with Annette Broadrick and Dixie Browning)
- Silhouette Summer Sizzlers, 1992 (1992) (with Linda Lael Miller and Paula Detmer Riggs)
- Silhouette Summer Sizzlers, 1995 (1995) (with Mary Lynn Baxter and Laura Parker)
- A Baby? Maybe (1996) (with Marie Ferrarella and Diana Palmer)
- Lessons in Love (1997) (with Terry Essig and Marie Ferrarella)
- The Father Factor (1998) (with Debbie Macomber and Diana Palmer)
- Montana Brides (1999) (with Susan Mallery and Diana Palmer)
- The Man She Married (1999) (with Annette Broadrick and Emma Darcy)
- Forget Me Not (2001) (with Marilyn Pappano)
- Summer Heat (2001) (with Linda Howard and Lindsay McKenna) (Game of Chance / Midnight Fantasy / Heart of the Warrior)
- Made for Love (2002) (with Dixie Browning)
- The Debutantes (2002) (with Beverly Barton and Christine Rimmer) (Jenna's Wild Ride / reinventing Mary / frankie's First Dress)
- Christmas Cowboys (2002) (with Stella Bagwell)
- Winter Nights (2002) (with Rebecca Brandewyne, Ginna Gray and Joan Hohl)
- What the Heart Can't Hide (2003) (with Linda Howard and Susan Mallery) (All that glitters / Goodbye Child / Best Bride)
- The Perfect Mom (2003) (with Janice Kay Johnson)
- The Ultimate Treasure (2003) (with Heather Graham and Merline Lovelace)
- Matters of the Heart (2003) (with Annette Broadrick and Pamela Morsi)
- A Cowboy and a Gentleman / Beckett's Children (2003) (with Dixie Browning)
- The Bride Tamer (2004) (with Kristi Gold)
- Small Wonders (2004) (with Candace Camp, Raye Morgan and Dallas Schulze)
- The Country Club / The Debutantes (2004) (with Beverly Barton and Christine Rimmer)
- Challenged by the Sheikh: Dynasties: The Danforths (2004) (with Kristi Gold)
- Bride Tamer / Pretending with the Playboy (2004) (with Cathleen Galitz)
- Shameless / Desperado Dad (2004) (with Linda Conrad)
- The Bride Tamer / Standing Outside the Fire (2005) (with Sara Orwig)
- Secret Admirer (2005) (with Christine Rimmer and Karen Rose Smith)
- Men Made in America Vol 2 (2007) (with Judith Arnold, Elizabeth August, Dallas Schulze and Rita Herron)
- Men Made in America Vol 8 (2007) (with Patricia Coughlin, Kelsey Roberts, Curtiss Ann Matlock and Paula Detmer Riggs)

== References and sources ==
- Ann Major's Official Website
- Ann Major's Webpage in Harlequin Enterprises Ltd
