= Heather Graham Pozzessere =

American writer

- Born: Heather Graham; March 15, 1953 (age 73); Miami-Dade County, Florida, U.S.
- Education: Theater Arts/University of South Florida
- Occupation: Novelist
- Spouse: Dennis Pozzessere
- Children: 5
- Writing career
- Pen name: Shannon Drake
- Period: 1982–present
- Genres: Romance, suspense, paranormal
- Website: www.theoriginalheathergraham.com

Heather Graham Pozzessere (born March 15, 1953) is an American writer, who writes primarily romance novels. She also writes under her maiden name Heather Graham as well as the pen name Shannon Drake. She has written over 150 novels and novellas, has been published in approximately 25 languages, and has had over 75 million copies printed.

== Biography ==
Born Heather Graham on March 15, 1953, she grew up in Miami-Dade County, Florida. She married Dennis Pozzessere shortly after her high school graduation. After high school, she went on and earned a degree in theater arts from the University of South Florida. She spent several years after that working in dinner theater, singing backup vocals, and bartending. After the birth of her third child, Pozzessere decided she could not afford to go to work anymore. She chose to stay at home, and, to fill her time, began to write horror stories and romances. After two years, in 1982, she sold her first novel, When Next We Love.

She has written more than 100 novels and novellas. Her books have been published in over 20 languages.

Romance Writers of America presented her with the 2003 Lifetime Achievement Award. She is a member of Mystery Writers of America, International Thriller Writers, and the Horror Writers Association (of which she is a former Vice President), and has received the Thriller Writer's Silver Bullet for charitable enterprises.

Pozzessere is a founder of the Florida chapter of the Romance Writers of America, and since 1999 has hosted the annual Romantic Times Vampire Ball for charity. In 2006, she hosted the first Writers for New Orleans on Labor Day, with workshops and a dinner theater event to benefit the city and the libraries. Labor Day of 2007 made it an annual event. She is the founder of the Slushpile players and Slushpile band.

In November 2016, it was announced that Pozzessere would co-author Chad Michael Murray in writing his second novel, titled American Drifter, released in November 2017.

== Family ==
She and her husband have five children.

== Bibliography ==
=== As Heather Graham ===
==== Stand-alone novels ====
- When Next We Love (1983)
- Tender Taming (1983)
- A Season for Love (1983)
- Quiet Walks the Tiger (1983)
- Night, Sea and Stars (1983)
- Hours to Cherish (1984)
- Tender Deception (1984)
- Red Midnight (1984)
- Arabian Nights (1984)
- Serena's Magic (1984)
- Hold Close the Memory (1985)
- A Circumstantial Affair (1986)
- Dante's Daughter (1986)
- Handful of Dreams (1986)
- The Maverick and the Lady (1986)
- Eden's Spell (1986)
- Liar's Moon (1987)
- Siren from the Sea (1987)
- Every Time I Love You (1988)
- The Devil's Mistress (1991)
- Spirit of the Season (1993)
- Renegades (1995)
- A Magical Christmas (1996)
- Queen of Hearts (1997)
- The Last Cavalier (1998)
- Tempestuous Eden (1999)
- Night of the Blackbird (2001)
- A Matter of Circumstance (2001)
- A Season of Miracles (2001; a.k.a. Miracle)
- In the Dark (2004)
- Suspicious (2005)
- Kiss Of Darkness (2006)
- The Island (2006)
- Blood Red (2007)
- The Last Noel (2007)
- Nightwalker (2009)
- Dust to Dust (2009)
- There Be Dragons (2009)
- Home in Time for Christmas (2009)
- The Killing Edge (2010)
- American Drifter (with Chad Michael Murray) (2017)
- "The Ghost of You" (novella) (2018)
- Undercover Connection (2018)
- Tangled Threat (2019)
- Witness to Death (2020)
- Danger in Numbers (March 23, 2021)

==== Donna Miro and Lorna Doria Series ====
1. Sensuous Angel (1985)
2. An Angel's Share (1985)

==== MacAuliffe Vikings Trilogy ====
1. Golden Surrender (1987)
2. The Viking's Woman (1993)
3. Lord of the Wolves (1993)

==== Camerons Saga ====
1. Sweet Savage Eden (1989)
2. A Pirate's Pleasure (1989)
3. Love Not a Rebel (1989)
4. One Wore Blue (1991)
5. And One Wore Gray (1992)
6. And One Rode West (1992)

===== Camerons Saga: North American Woman Trilogy =====
1. Sweet Savage Eden (1989)
2. A Pirate's Pleasure (1989)
3. Love Not a Rebel (1989)

===== Camerons Saga: Civil War Trilogy =====
1. One Wore Blue (1991)
2. And One Wore Gray (1992)
3. And One Rode West (1992)

==== Old Florida's MacKenzies Series ====
1. Runaway (1994)
2. Captive (1996)
3. Rebel (1997)
4. Surrender (1998)
5. Glory (1999)
6. Triumph (2000)

==== Suspense Series ====
1. Drop Dead Gorgeous (1998)
2. Tall, Dark, and Deadly (1999)
3. Long, Lean and Lethal (2000)
4. Dying to Have Her (2001)
5. Hurricane Bay (2002)
6. Picture Me Dead (2003)
7. Dead on the Dance Floor (2004)
8. The Presence (2004)
9. Killing Kelly (2005)

===== Suspense Series: Soap Opera =====
1. Long, Lean and Lethal (2000)
2. Dying to Have Her (2001)
3. Killing Kelly (2005)

===== Suspense Series: The O'Casey Brothers =====
1. Dead on the Dance Floor (2004)
2. Killing Kelly (2005)

==== Harrison Investigation Series ====
1. Haunted (2003)
2. The Presence (2004)
3. Ghost Walk (2005)
4. The Vision (2006)
5. The Seance (2007)
6. The Dead Room (2007)
7. The Death Dealer (2008)
8. Unhallowed Ground (2009)
9. Nightwalker (2009)
10. The Killing Edge (2010)

==== The Flynn Brothers Trilogy ====
1. Deadly Night (2008)
2. Deadly Harvest (2008)
3. Deadly Gift (2008)

==== Prophecy Series ====
1. Dust to Dust (2009)

==== Vampire Hunters Series ====
1. Night of the Wolves (2009)
2. Night of the Vampires (2010)
3. Bride of the Night (2011)

==== The Bone Island Series ====
1. Ghost Memories (2010)
2. Ghost Shadow (2010)
3. Ghost Night (2010)
4. Ghost Moon (2010)

==== Krewe of Hunters ====
1. Phantom Evil (2011)
2. Heart of Evil (2011)
3. Sacred Evil (2011)
4. The Evil Inside (2011)
5. The Unseen (2012)
6. The Unholy (2012)
7. The Unspoken (2012)
8. The Uninvited (2012)
9. The Night is Watching (2013)
10. The Night is Alive (2013)
11. The Night is Forever (2013)
12. "Crimson Twilight" (novella) (2014)
13. The Cursed (2014)
14. The Hexed (2014)
15. The Betrayed (2014)
16. "When Irish Eyes are Haunting" (novella) (2015)
17. The Silenced (2015)
18. The Forgotten (2015)
19. "All Hallows Eve" (novella) (2015)
20. The Hidden (2015)
21. Haunted Destiny (2016)
22. Deadly Fate (2016)
23. Darkest Journey (2016)
24. Dying Breath (2017)
25. Dark Rites (2017)
26. Doomed Legacy (2017)
27. "Hallow Be the Haunt" (novella) (2017)
28. Wicked Deeds (2017)
29. Fade to Black (2018)
30. Pale as Death (2018)
31. Echoes of Evil (2018)
32. "Haunted Be the Holidays" (novella) (2018)
33. "Christmas, The Krewe and a Large White Rabbit" (novella) (2018)
34. The Summoning (2019)
35. The Seekers (2019)
36. The Stalking (2019)
37. "Blood Night" (novella) (2019)
38. "Horror-Ween" (novella) (2019)
39. "The Best Christmas Ever" (novella) (2019)
40. Seeing Darkness (2020)
41. Deadly Touch (2020)
42. "The Dead Heat of Summer" (novella) (2020)
43. Dreaming Death (2020)
44. "A Most Unusual Case" (novella) (2020)
45. The Unforgiven (2021)
46. The Forbidden (2021)
47. The Unknown (2021)

==== Cafferty & Quinn ====
1. Let the Dead Sleep (2013)
2. Waking the Dead (2014)
3. "Infernal Night: Michael Quinn vs. Repairman Jack" (novella; with F. Paul Wilson) (2014)
4. The Dead Play On (2015)
5. "Blood on the Bayou" (novella) (2016)
6. "Toys in the Attic" (novella) (2017)
7. "Big Easy Evil" (novella) (2017)
8. Bitter Reckoning (2018)

==== New York Confidential ====
1. Flawless (2016)
2. A Perfect Obsession (2017)
3. A Dangerous Game (2018)
4. A Lethal Legacy (2019)
5. The Final Deception (2020)

==== Finnegan Connection ====
1. Law and Disorder (2017)
2. Shadows in the Night (2017)
3. Out of the Darkness (2018)

==== The Rising ====
1. The Rising (with Jon Land) (2017)
2. Blood Moon (with Jon Land) (2022)

==== Non-fiction ====
- Some Wore Blue & Some Wore Gray (2013)
- Why I Love New Orleans (2014)

==== Collections ====
- The Best of Heather Graham: Tender Taming / When Next We Love (1990)
- The Best of Heather Graham: A Season for Love / Quiet Walks the Tiger (1991)
- Untamed Maverick Hearts (1993)
- Tender Taming / When Next We Love (1994)
- Three Complete Novels: Sweet Savage Eden / A Pirate's Pleasure / Love Not a Rebel (1994)
- A Season for Love and Quiet Walks the Tiger (1994)

==== Omnibus in collaboration ====
- All in the Family: West Virginia/Betrayed By Love (1987; with Diana Palmer)
- Love's Legacy (1996; with Madeline Baker, Mary Balogh, Elaine Barbieri, Lori Copeland, Cassie Edwards, Catherine Hart, Virginia Henley, Penelope Neri, Diana Palmer and Janelle Taylor)
- Lovers Dark and Dangerous (1996; with Helen R. Myers and Anne Stuart)
- Daughters Of Destiny (2001; with Merline Lovelace and Patricia Potter)
- Lonesome Rider/The Heart's Desire (2001; with Gayle Wilson)
- Home and Family: All in the Family/Tell Me a Story/Saturday's Child/Wedding of the Year/Seize the Fire (2001; with Elda Minger and Dallas Schulze)
- Reckless Hearts (2001; with Miranda Jarrett)
- Beautiful Stranger: The Last Cavalier/Mystery Child (2001; with Carla Cassidy)
- Lucia in Love/Lion on the Prowl (2001; with Kasey Michaels)
- With a Southern Touch (2002; with Jennifer Blake and Diana Palmer)
- On the Edge (2003; with Carla Neggers and Sharon Sala)
- Forbidden Stranger (2003; with Julia Justiss)
- The Ultimate Treasure (2003; with Merline Lovelace and Ann Major)
- Snowy Nights (2003; with Annette Broadrick, Lindsay McKenna and Marilyn Pappano)
- Forces of Nature (2004; with Beverly Barton)
- In the Dark/Get Blondie - Intimate (2004; with Carla Cassidy)
- I'd Kill for That (2004; with Rita Mae Brown, Jennifer Crusie, Linda Fairstein, Lisa Gardner, Kay Hooper, Katherine Neville, Anne Perry, Kathy Reichs, Julie Smith and Tina Wainscott)
- Warrior without Rules/Suspicious (2005; with Nancy Gideon)
- A Bride by Christmas (2008; with Jo Beverley and Candace Camp)
- More Than Words Volume 5 (2009; with Stephanie Bond, Candace Camp, Brenda Jackson and Tara Taylor Quinn)
- Holiday with a Vampire 4 (2012, with Susan Krinard, Theresa Myers and Linda Thomas-Sundstrom)
  - The Gatekeeper

=== As Heather Graham Pozzessere ===
Some re-edited as Heather Graham.

==== Stand-alone novels ====
- Night Moves (1985)
- Double Entendre (1986)
- The Di Medici Bride (1986)
- The Game of Love (1986)
- King of the Castle (1987)
- A Circumstantial Affair (1986; a.k.a. A Matter of Circumstance)
- All in the Family (1987)
- Lucia in Love (1988)
- Strangers in Paradise (1988)
- This Rough Magic (1988)
- Home for Christmas (1989)
- A Perilous Eden (1990)
- Forever My Love (1990)
- Wedding Bell Blues (1990)
- Forbidden Fire (1991)
- Snowfire (1991)
- The Christmas Bride (1991)
- Hatfield and McCoy (1991)
- Mistress of Magic (1995)
- Between Roc and a Hard Place (1993)
- Last Cavalier (1993)
- Lonesome Rider (1993)
- The Trouble with Andrew (1993)
- Wilde imaginings (1993)
- Slow Burn (1994)
- An Angel's Touch (1995)
- Eyes of Fire (1995)
- For All of Her Life (1995; re-issued as Up In Flames (February 27, 2018))
- Seize the Wind (1995)
- Down in New Orleans (1996)
- If Looks Could Kill (1997)
- Never Sleep with Strangers (1998)
- Night Heat (2001)

==== Angel Hawk Series ====
1. Bride of the Tiger (1987)
2. Angel of Mercy (1988)
3. Borrowed Angel (1989)
- Night Heat: Bride of the Tiger/Angel of Mercy/ Borrowed Angel (2001)

==== Slater's Summer Fires Series ====
1. Dark Stranger (1993)
2. Rides a Hero (1989)
3. Apache Summer (1989)
- Summer Fires: Dark Stranger, Rides a Hero and Apache Summer (1998)

==== Omnibus in collaboration ====
- Brave Hearts (1994; with Kathleen Eagle and Diana Palmer)
- Destined for Love (1998; with Annette Broadrick and Kathleen Korbel)
- Forever Mine (1998; with Elizabeth Lowell and Nora Roberts)
- Summer Sensations (1998; with Linda Howard and Linda Lael Miller)
- Always and Forever (1998) (with Linda Howard and Linda Lael Miller)
- Legacies of Love Collection: Legacy, No Stranger and Wedding Bell Blues (1999; with Stella Cameron and Jayne Ann Krentz)

=== As Shannon Drake ===
==== Stand-alone novels ====
- Tomorrow the Glory (1985)
- Blue Heaven, Black Night (1986)
- Ondine (1988)
- Lie Down in Roses (1988)
- Emerald Embrace (1991)
- And I Will Love You Forever (1991)
- Gifts of Love (1991)
- Damsel in Distress (1992)
- Bride of the Wind (1992)
- Vanquish the Night (1992)
- Lovers and Demons (1993)
- One Little Miracle (1993)
- Branded Hearts (1995)
- The King's Pleasure (1998)
- The Pirate Bride (2008)

==== Fire Series ====
1. Princess of Fire (1989)
2. Knight of Fire (1993)

==== No Other Series ====
1. No Other Man (1995)
2. No Other Woman (1996)
3. No Other Love (1997)

==== Vampires Series ====
1. Beneath a Blood Red Moon (1999)
2. When Darkness Falls (2000)
3. Deep Midnight (2001)
4. Realm of Shadows (2002)
5. The Awakening (2003)
6. Dead by Dusk (2005)
7. Kiss Of Darkness (2006)
8. Blood Red (2007)

==== Graham Family Series ====
1. Come the Morning (1999)
2. Conquer the Night (2000)
3. Seize the Dawn (2001)
4. Knight Triumphant (2002)
5. The Lion in Glory (2003)
6. When We Touch (2004)
7. The Queen's Lady (2007)

==== Victorian Fairy Tale Series ====
1. Wicked (2005)
2. Reckless (2005)
3. Beguiled (2006)

==== Omnibus in collaboration ====
- Haunting Love Stories (1991; with Betina Krahn, Linda Lael Miller and Christina Skye)
- Christmas Love Stories (1991; with Diane Wicker Davis, Kay Hooper and Lisa Kleypas)
- Night Magic (1993; with Rebecca Brandewyne, Jill Gregory and Becky Lee Weyrich)
- Under the Mistletoe (1993; with Judith E French, Sara Orwig and Rebecca Paisley)
