= Linda Howard =

American writer (born 1950)

Linda S. Howington
- Born: Linda S. August 3, 1950 (age 76); Alabama, U.S.
- Occupation: Novelist
- Spouse: Gary F. Howington (1975-2025)
- Writing career
- Pen name: Linda Howard
- Period: 1982–present
- Genres: Romance, Suspense
- Website: www.randomhouse.com/features/lhoward/

Linda S. Howington (born August 3, 1950 in Alabama, United States) is an American best-selling romance and suspense author who publishes under the pseudonym Linda Howard.

== Biography ==
Howington began to write at nine years old, and wrote for twenty years for her own enjoyment. She worked at a trucking company where she met her husband, Gary F. Howington, and then decided to try to get her work published in 1980. After 21 years of penning stories for her own enjoyment, she submitted a novel for publication which was very successful. Her first work, All That Glitters, was published by Silhouette in 1982.

Howington joined the Romance Writers of America (RWA) in 1981, shortly after it was formed. She served as Region 3 Director (until 31 October 2008). In 2017, Howard criticized the RWA's attempts to be more inclusive of non-white authors, writing on an internal forum that "Diversity for the sake of diversity is discrimination". The controversy caused by her statement led Howington to resign from the organization.

Her husband was a professional bass tournament fisherman, and she traveled with him and worked on her laptop. The couple lived on a farm in Alabama, where they raised cattle and had two dogs. Linda’s husband passed away on January 3, 2025

== Awards ==
2005 - Romance Writers of America. Career Achievement Award

== Bibliography ==
=== Single novels ===
- All That Glitters (1982)
- An Independent Wife (1982)
- Against the Rules (1983)
- Come Lie With Me (1984)
- Tears of the Renegade (1985)
- The Cutting Edge (1985)
- The Way Home (1991)
- Overload (1993)
- Heart of Fire (1993)
- Dream Man (1995)
- After the Night (1995)
- Lake of Dreams (1995)
- Shades of Twilight (1996)
- White Out (1997)
- Son of the Morning (1997)
- Night Moves (1998)
- Now You See Her (1998)
- Blue Moon (1999)
- Mr. Perfect (2000)
- Open Season (2001)
- Strangers in the Night (2001)
- Dying to Please (2002)
- Cry No More (2003)
- Killing Time (2005)
- Cover of Night (2006)
- Up Close and Dangerous (2007)
- Death Angel (2008)
- Burn (2009)
- Ice (2010)
- Veil of Night (2010)
- Prey (2011)
- Shadow Woman (2013)

=== Spencer-Nyle Co. series ===
1. Sarah's Child (1985)
2. Almost Forever (1986)
3. Bluebird Winter(1987)

=== Rescues (Kell Sabin) series ===
1. Midnight Rainbow (1986)
2. Diamond Bay (1987)
3. Heartbreaker (1987)
4. White Lies (1988)

=== MacKenzie Family Saga series ===
1. MacKenzie's Mountain (1989)
2. MacKenzie's Mission (1992)
3. MacKenzie's Pleasure (1996)
4. MacKenzie's Magic (1996)
5. A Game of Chance (2000)

=== A Lady Of The West series ===
1. A Lady of the West (1990)
2. Angel Creek (1991)
3. The Touch of Fire (1992)

=== Patterson-Cannon Family series ===
1. Duncan's Bride (1990)
2. Loving Evangeline (1994)

=== CIA's Spies (John Medina) series ===
1. Kill and Tell (1998)
2. All the Queen's Men (1999)
3. Kiss Me While I Sleep (2004)

=== Blair Mallory series ===
- To Die For (2004)
- Drop Dead Gorgeous (2006)

=== GO-Team series ===
- Troublemaker (2016)
- The Woman Left Behind (2018)

=== Linda Howard & Linda Jones ===
After Sundown (2020)

==== Vampire ====
1. Blood Born (2010)
1. 2 'Warrior Rising' (2016)

==== Men from Battle Ridge ====
1. Running Wild (2012)

=== Collections ===
- Trouble: Midnight Rainbow / Diamond Bay (1992)
- Night Moves: Dream Man / After the Night (1998)
- Strangers in the Night: Lake of Dreams / Blue Moon / White Out (2001)
- Shades of Twilight / Son of the Morning (2005)
- Angel Creek / Lady of the West (2005)
- Mackenzies Bundle: "Mackenzie's Mountain / Mackenzie's Mission / Mackenzie's Pleasure / A Game Of Chance" (2006)
- At His Mercy: Mackenzie's Magic / Heartbreaker / Overload (2008)
- Duncan's Bride / Loving Evangeline (2008)
- Exposure: The Cutting Edge / White Lies (2012)

=== Omnibus in collaboration ===
- Silhouette Christmas Stories, 1987 (1987) (with Dixie Browning, Ginna Gray and Diana Palmer) (Bluebird Winter / Henry the Ninth / Season of Miracles / Humbug Man)
- To Mother with Love (1993) (with Robyn Carr and Cheryl Reavis) (Way Home / Backward Glance / So This Is Love)
- Silhouette Summer Sizzlers, '93 (1993) (with Carole Buck and Suzanne Carey) (Overload, Hot Copy, Steam Bath)
- Christmas Kisses (1996) (with Debbie Macomber and Linda Turner) (Mackenzie's Magic / Silver Bells / Wild West Christmas)
- Forever Yours (1997) (with Catherine Coulter and Barbara Delinsky) (Threats and Promises / The Aristocrat / Loving Evangeline)
- Harlequin (1997) (with Debbie Macomber and Diana Palmer)
- Upon a Midnight Clear (1997) (with Margaret Allison, Jude Deveraux, Stef Ann Holm and Mariah Stewart) (Teacher / Christmas Magic / Jolly Holly / If Only In My Dreams / White Out)
- Heart's Desire (1998) (with Jayne Ann Krentz and Linda Lael Miller) (Connecting Rooms / Lake of Dreams / Resurrection)
- Everlasting Love (1998) (with Jayne Ann Krentz, Kasey Michaels, Linda Lael Miller and Carla Neggers) (Connecting Rooms / Resurrection / Lake of Dreams / Role of a Lifetime / Tricks of Fate)
- Heart and Soul (1998) (with Stella Cameron, Barbara Delinsky) (Dream / All that Sparkles / Independent Wife)
- Summer Sensations (1998) (with Heather Graham and Linda Lael Miller) (Overload / Leopard's Woman / Lonesome Rider)
- Always and Forever (1998) (with Heather Graham and Linda Lael Miller) (Heartbreaker / Used-to-be-lovers / Strangers in Paradise)
- Through the Years (1999) (with Debbie Macomber and Fern Michaels) (Tears of the Renegade / Golden Lasso / Baby Blessed)
- Under the Boardwalk (1999) (with Geralyn Dawson, Jillian Hunter, Miranda Jarrett and Mariah Stewart) (Blue Moon / Castaway / Ruined / Buried Treasure / Swept Away)
- A Bouquet of Babies (2000) (with Stella Bagwell and Paula Detmer Riggs) (Way Home / Family by Fate / Baby on her Doorstep)
- MacKenzie's Pleasure / Defending His Own (2001) (with Beverly Barton)
- Come Lie with Me / Part of the Bargain / Yesterday's Love (2001) (with Linda Lael Miller and Sherryl Woods)
- Finding Home (2001) (with Elizabeth Lowell and Kasey Michaels) (Duncan's Bride / Chain Lightning / Popcorn and Kisses)
- Summer Heat (2001) (with Lindsay McKenna and Ann Major) (Game of Chance / Midnight Fantasy / Heart of the Warrior)
- Unlikely Alliances (2002) (with Diana Palmer and Sharon Sala) (Independent Wife / Diamond Girl / Annie and the Outlaw)
- Overload / If a Man Answers (2002) (with Merline Lovelace)
- Delivered by Christmas (2002) (with Joan Hohl and Sandra Steffen) (Bluebird Winter / Gift of Joy / Christmas to Treasure)
- What the Heart Can't Hide (2003) (with Ann Major and Susan Mallery) (All that glitters / Goodbye Child / Best Bride)
- On His Terms (2003) (with Allison Leigh) (Loving Evangeline / One More Chance)
- 100 Per Cent Hero (2003) (with Suzanne Brockmann) (MacKenzie's Pleasure / Forever Blue)
- A Mother's Touch (2005) (with Emilie Richards and Sherryl Woods) (Way Home / Stranger's Son / Paternity Test)
- Irresistible (2005) (with Diana Palmer) (Beloved / A Game of Chance)
- Way Home / Cowboy's Christmas Miracle / Because a Husband is Forever (2005) (with Marie Ferrarella and Anne McAllister)
- "Raintree: Inferno", (Silhouette Nocturne) by Linda Howard, "Raintree: Haunted", by Linda Winstead Jones, "Raintree: Sanctuary", by Beverly Barton (2007)
- Under the Mistletoe, (2008) (with Stephanie Bond) (Bluebird Winter) & (Naughty or Nice)
- Almost Forever / For the Baby's Sake (2010) ( with Christine Rimmer)
- Lethal Attraction, (2013) (with Marie Force) (Against the Rules & Fatal Affair)
