= Marie Ferrarella =

American novelist (born 1948)

Marie Rydzynski-Ferrarella
- Born: March 28, 1948 (age 78); Germany
- Education: Queens College, City University of New York
- Occupation: Novelist
- Writing career
- Pen name: Marie Ferrarella; Marie Nicole; Marie Michael; Marie Charles
- Period: 1981–present
- Genre: Romance
- Notable work: Father Goose
- Notable awards: RITA award – Traditional Romance; 1993 Father Goose
- Website: www.marieferrarella.com

Marie Ferrarella, née Rydzynski (born March 28, 1948, in Germany) is an American writer of over 272 romance novels as Marie Ferrarella, which have been translated into at least seven languages. She has also written under the names Marie Nicole, Marie Michael, and Marie Charles.

== Biography ==
Marie Rydzynski was born on March 28, 1948, to Polish parents in Allied-occupied Germany, and moved to the United States when she was four. She has a master's degree in Shakespearean comedy from Queens College in New York City.

Her first romance was sold in 1982 and she has since written over three hundred other novels. She has won a Romance Writers of America RITA Award for best Traditional Romance, and has been named a Romantic Times Career Achievement Winner.

Ferrarella and her husband live in Southern California, with their two children. Her hobbies include old movies, musicals and mysteries.

== Bibliography ==
=== As Marie Ferrarella ===
==== Single novels ====
- Smoldering Embers (1982)
- Claimed By Rapture (1983)
- December 32nd - And Always (1983)
- Scenes From The Heart (1983)
- Buyer Beware (1984)
- Irresistible Forces (1984)
- Through Laughter and Tears (1984)
- Tried and True (1984)
- Country Blue (1985)
- Grand Theft: Heart (1985)
- Man Under Cover (1985)
- Please Stand By (1985)
- Thick as Thieves (1985)
- A Woman of Integrity (1985)
- Pocketful of Rainbows (1986)
- Code Name: Love (1986)
- Foxy Lady (1986)
- Getting Physical (1986)
- Last Year's Hunk (1986)
- Mine By Write (1986)
- No Way To Treat A Lover (1986)
- Chocolate Dreams (1987)
- No Laughing Matter (1987)
- Risking It All (1987)
- The Gift (1988)
- Five-Alarm Affair (1988)
- Heart To Heart (1989)
- Mother for Hire (1989)
- It Happened One Night (1990)
- Borrowed Baby (1990)
- Her Special Angel (1990)
- Undoing Of Justin Starbuck (1990)
- A Girl's Best Friend (1991)
- Blessing in Disguise (1991)
- Sapphire and Shadow (1991)
- Someone to Talk to (1991)
- Father Goose (1992)
- Moonlight Rebel (1992)
- World's Greatest Dad (1992)
- Holding Out for a Hero (1993)
- Aunt Connie's Wedding (1993)
- The Right Man (1993)
- Heroes Great and Small (1993)
- In Her Own Backyard (1993)
- Family Matters (1993)
- Her Man Friday (1993)
- Moonlight Lover (1993)
- She Got Her Man (1993)
- Christmas Every Day (1993)
- Flash and Fire (1994)
- Caution: Baby Ahead (1994)
- Moonlight Surrender (1994)
- Mother on the Wing (1994)
- Baby Times Two (1994)
- Callaghan's Way (1994)
- Father in the Making (1995)
- Caitlin's Guardian Angel (1995)
- Brooding Angel (1995)
- Let's Get Mommy Married: Yours Truly (1996)
- The Man Who Would Be Daddy (1996)
- Christmas Bride (1996)
- My Phony Valentine (1997)
- Traci on the Spot (1997)
- The Amnesiac Bride (1997)
- Mommy and the Policeman Next Door (1997)
- Lessons in Love (1997)
- Serena McKee's Back in Town (1997)
- The Offer She Couldn't Refuse (1998)
- Angus's Lost Lady (1998)
- A Husband Waiting to Happen (1998)
- Wanted, Husband, Will Train (1998)
- The Women in Joe Sullivan's Life (1998)
- Cassandra (1998)
- Suddenly... Marriage! (1998)
- Expecting in Texas (1999)
- A Hero for All Seasons (1999)
- Hero in the Nick of Time (1999)
- This Heart for Hire (1999)
- Father Most Wanted (2000)
- A Forever Kind of Hero (2000)
- Hero for Hire (2000)
- Tall Strong and Cool Under Fire (2000)
- Your Baby or Mine? (2001)
- Childfinders, Inc. (2001)
- For Her Baby's Sake (2001)
- A Hero in Her Eyes (2001)
- Heart of a Hero (2001)
- Rough Around the Edges (2001)
- A Dad at Last (2001)
- Dad by Choice (2003)
- And Babies Make Four (2003)
- Immovable Objects: Family Secrets: The Next Generation (2004)
- Starting from Scratch (2005)
- Sundays Are for Murder (2006)
- The Woman Who Wasn't There (2006)
- Finding Home (2006)
- Mother In Training (2006)
- The Second Time Around (2007)
- Her Lawman On Call (2007)
- Mr. Hall Takes A Bride (2007)
- Diagnosis: Danger (2007)
- Romancing The Teacher (2007)

==== McClellan-Marino Series ====
1. Man Trouble (1991)
2. The Taming of the Teen (1991)
3. Babies on His Mind (1993)
4. The Baby Beneath the Mistletoe (1999)

==== Pendleton Series ====
1. Baby in the Middle (1994)
2. Husband, Some Assembly Required (1994)

==== Baby Of The Month Club Series ====
1. Baby's First Christmas (1995)
2. Happy New Year, Baby! (1995)
3. 7lb, 2oz Valentine (1996)
4. Husband, Optional (1996)
5. Do You Take This Child? (1996)
6. In The Family Way (1998)
7. Baby Talk (1999)
8. The Once and Future Father (2000)
9. An Abundance of Babies (2001)
10. Detective Dad (2003)

==== Cutler Series ====
1. Fiona and the Sexy Stranger (1998)
2. Cowboys Are for Loving (1998)
3. Will and the Headstrong Female (1998)
4. The Law and Ginny Marlow (1998)
5. Match for Morgan (1999)
6. A Triple Threat to Bachelorhood (2002)

==== Alaskans Series ====
1. Wife in the Mail (1998)
2. Stand-in Mum (1999)
3. Found, His Perfect Wife (2000)
4. The M.D. Meets His Match (2001)
5. Lily and the Lawman (2003)
6. The Bride Wore Blue Jeans (2003)
7. The Prodigal M.D. Returns (2006)

==== McCloud: Like Mother, Like Daughter Series ====
1. One Plus One Makes Marriage (1998)
2. Never Too Late for Love (1999)

==== Quatermain Series ====
1. The Baby Came C.O.D. (2000)
2. Desperately Seeking Twin.... (2000)

==== Bachelors of Blair Memorial Series ====
1. In Graywolf's Hands (2002)
2. Mac's Bedside Manner (2002)
3. M.D. Most Wanted (2002)
4. Undercover MD (2002)
5. The M.D.'s Surprise Family (2004)
6. The Best Medicine (omnibus) (2005)
7. Searching for Cate (2005)

==== Lone Star Country Club Series ====
1. Once a Father (2002)
2. Texas Rose (2002)

==== Mom Squad Series ====
1. A Billionaire and a Baby (2003)
2. A Bachelor and a Baby (2003)
3. Beauty and the Baby (2003)
4. The Baby Mission (2003)

==== Cavanaugh Justice Series ====
1. Crime And Passion (2003)
2. Internal Affair (2003)
3. Racing Against Time (2003)
4. Alone in the Dark (2004)
5. Cavanaugh's Woman (2004)
6. Dangerous Games (2004)
7. In Broad Day Light (2004)
8. The Strong Silent Type (2004)
9. Dangerous Disguise (2005)
10. Cavanaugh Watch (2006)

==== Cameo Series ====
1. Because a Husband Is Forever (2005)
2. Her Special Charm (2005)
3. She's Having A Baby (2005)

==== The Fortune Series multi-author ====
- 11. Forgotten Honeymoon (1997)

==== Storkville, U.S.A. Series multi-author ====
- 01. Those Matchmaking Babies (2000)

==== Romancing The Crown Series multi-author ====
- 03. The Disenchanted Duke (2002)

==== Parks Empire Series multi-author ====
- 02. Diamonds And Deceptions (2004)

==== Logan's Legacy Series multi-author ====
- 05. The Bachelor (2004)

==== Fortunes of Texas: Reunion Series multi-author ====
- 01. Her Good Fortune (2005)
- 08. A Baby Changes Everything (2005)
- 16. Military Man (2006)

==== Most Likely to... Series multi-author ====
- 03. The Measure Of A Man (2005)

==== Capturing the Crown Series multi-author ====
- 01. The Heart of a Ruler (2006)

==== Marchand Series multi-author ====
- 02. The Setup (2006)

==== Collections ====
- Husbands and Other Strangers (2006)

==== Omnibus in collaboration ====
- A Taste of Heaven / Moonlight Lover / Gypsy Jewel / Sea Mistress (1993) (with Barbara Benedict, Patricia McAllister and Candace McCarthy)
- A Baby? Maybe (1996) (with Ann Major and Diana Palmer)
- For the Baby's Sake (1997) (with Mary Lynn Baxter and Kathleen Eagle)
- Summer Loving (1998) (with Diane Pershing, JoAnn Ross and Tiffany White)
- 3, 2, 1... Married!: Catch a Cowboy, Collide with a Single Daddy, Get Personal (1999) (with Beverly Barton and Sharon Sala)
- Silhouette Sensational: Forgotten Vows...? / License to Love / Cowboy Daddy / Babies On His Mind (1999) (with Barbara Boswell, Susan Mallery and Maggie Shayne)
- Crazy for You (1999)
- In Defense of Love / Her Special Angel / Daddy Christmas / Home for Christmas (1999) (with Kathleen Creighton and Cathy Gillen Thacker)
- Take This Man (2000) (with Diana Palmer and Nora Roberts)
- Nine Months and Counting (2000) (with Myrna Temte)
- The Inheritance / Trueblood Texas (2001) (with Jo Leigh)
- Yuletide Brides: Christmas Bride / Father By Marriage (2001) (with Suzanne Carey)
- Dangerous to Love (2002) (with Beverly Barton and Lindsay McKenna)
- The Family Factor (2002) (with Carolyn Zane)
- Labor of Love (2002) (with Leanne Banks and Sharon Sala)
- At Her Service (2002) (with Annette Broadrick)
- A Mother's Day (2002) (with Elizabeth Bevarly and Emilie Richards)
- The Romance Collection (2002) (with Maureen Child and Sharon Sala)
- Everybody's Talking (2003) (with Jasmine Cresswell and Jayne Ann Krentz)
- Crime and Passion / Midnight Run (2004) (with Linda Castillo)
- Mother's Love (2004) (with Elizabeth Bevarly and Emilie Richards)
- Dangerous Games / Irresistible Forces (2004) (with Candace Irvin)
- Baby on the Way / Counting on a Cowboy / Secrets of a Small Town (2004) (with Patricia Kay and Karen Sandler)
- Scenes of Passion / A Bachelor and a Baby (2004) (with Suzanne Brockmann)
- Beauty and the Baby / Social Graces (2004) (with Dixie Browning)
- Cattleman's Heart / Strong Silent Type (2004) (with Lois Faye Dyer)
- Daddy Survey / Cavanaugh's Woman (2004) (with Janis Reams Hudson)
- California Christmas (2004) (with Dallas Schulze)
- Charlie's Angels / Diamonds and Deceptions (2004) (with Cheryl St. John)
- Alone in the Dark / Her Man to Remember (2004) (with Suzanne McMinn)
- Their New Year Babies (2004) (with Debbie Macomber)
- Inheritance / Very Special Delivery (2005) (with Myrna Mackenzie)
- Triple Dare / Immovable Objects (2005) (with Candace Irvin)
- For Love and Family / The Bachelor (2005) (with Victoria Pade)
- Her Good Fortune / Tycoon in Texas (2005) (with Crystal Green)
- Tycoon's Marriage Bid / Measure of a Man (2005) (with Allison Leigh)
- She's Having a Baby / Once and Again (2005) (with Brenda Harlen)
- In Broad Daylight / Romancing the Renegade (2005) (with Ingrid Weaver)
- Way Home / Cowboy's Christmas Miracle / Because a Husband is Forever (2005) (with Linda Howard and Anne McAllister)
- From This Day Forward (2005) (with Emilie Richards)
- Her Special Charm / Past Imperfect (2006) (with Crystal Green)
- Temporary Brides? (2006) (with Patricia Hagan)
- Instant Family! (2007) (with Christine Rimmer)

=== As Marie Nicole ===
==== Single novels ====
- Tried and True (1984)
- Buyer Beware (1984)
- Please Stand by (1985)
- Through Laughter and Tears (1985)
- Grand Theft: Heart (1985)
- Man Undercover (1985)
- Woman of Integrity (1985)
- Thick As Thieves (1985)
- Code Name: Love (1985)
- Foxy Lady (1986)
- Mine By Write (1986)
- Country Blue (1986)
- Last Year's Hunk (1986)
- Getting Physical (1986)
- No Laughing Matter (1987)
- Chocolate Dreams (1987)

=== As Marie Michaels ===
==== Single novels ====
- Irresistible Forces (1984)
- No Way To Treat a Lover (1986)

== Awards ==
- 1993 - Romance Writers of America RITA Award, Traditional Romance – Father Goose
