= Annette Broadrick =

American novelist (born 1938)

- Born: November 26, 1938 (age 87); United States
- Occupation: Novelist
- Writing career
- Period: 1984–2009 (retired)
- Genre: Romance novel

Annette Broadrick (born November 26, 1938) is an American writer of over 55 romance novels since 1984.

== Biography ==
Broadrick was born on November 26, 1938, and raised as an only child for sixteen years, until her younger sister, Derralee, was born. Two years after that, as soon as she was graduated from high school in 1957, Broadrick married. The first of her four sons, David, arrived a year later, when she was 19. Rick, Randy, and Kevin came along quickly after that. For twenty-five years, Broadrick worked as a legal secretary to help supplement her husband's income. During that time period, the family lived in Arizona, Texas, Illinois and Oregon.

After her youngest child graduated from high school, Broadrick decided to try writing a book. In January 1984, she sold her first manuscript to Silhouette. She has been a full-time writer since then, with over fifty books published by Silhouette. Broadrick lives in the Texas Hill Country.

== Awards ==
- 1984 nominee for Romantic Times Magazine's Best New Authors of the Year
- Romantic Times Reviewers' Choice Award Winner for Best in Series
- Romantic Times W.I.S.H. Award winner
- Romantic Times Lifetime Achievement Award winner for Series Romance
- Romantic Times Lifetime Achievement Award winner for Series Romantic Fantasy

== Bibliography ==
=== Stand alone novels ===
- Circumstantial Evidence (1984)
- Provocative Peril (1985)
- Sound of Summer (1986)
- Unheavenly Angel (1986)
- Return to Yesterday (1987)
- Strange Enchantment (1987)
- Made in Heaven (1987)
- Adam's Story (1987)
- Mystery Lover (1987)
- Christmas Magic (1988)
- Momentary Marriage (1988)
- With All My Heart (1988)
- A Touch of Spring (1988)
- Married? (1990)
- Lone Wolf (1991)
- Zeke (1993)
- Solution Marriage (1993)
- Mystery Wife (1994)
- Impromptu Bride (1994)
- Mysterious Mountain Man (1995)
- Cowboys And Wedding Bells (1999)
- The President's Daughter (1999)
- Daughters of Texas (2000)
- Hard to Forget (2001)
- But Not for Me (2002)
- Daddy's Angel (2004)
- Instant Mommy (2006)
- The Man Means Business (2006)

=== Men on a Mission Series ===
1. Hunter's Prey (1984)
2. Bachelor Father (1985)
3. Hawk's Flight (1985)
4. Marriage Prey (2000)

=== Brandon Sisters Series ===
1. Choices (1986)
2. Heat of the Night (1986)

=== Crawford-Duncan Series ===
1. That's What Friends (1987)
2. Come Be My Love (1988)

=== Max Series ===
1. Irresistible (1989)
2. A Love Remembered (1989)
3. The Gemini Man (1991)
4. Where There Is Love (1992)

=== Donovan-Sheldon Series ===
1. Loving Spirit (1990)
2. Candlelight for Two (1990)

=== Sons of Texas Series ===
1. Love Texas Style! (1992)
2. Courtship Texas Style! (1992)
3. Marriage Texas Style! (1992)
4. Temptation Texas Style! (1994)
5. Rogues and Ranchers (1996)
6. Love And Courtship! (1998)
7. Callaway Country (2000)

=== Daughters of Texas Series ===
1. Megan's Marriage (1996)
2. Instant Mummy (1996)
3. Groom, I Presume? (1996)

=== Crenshaws of Texas Series ===
1. Lean, Mean and Lonesome (1999)
2. Tall, Dark and Texan (1999)
3. Branded (2004)
4. Caught in the Crossfire (2004)
5. Double Identity (2005)
6. Danger Becomes You (2005)
7. The Crenshaw Brothers' Virgin Brides (2005)
- The Crenshaw Brothers contains Double Identity / Danger Becomes You (omnibus) (2006)

=== Secret Sisters Series ===
1. Man in the Mist (2003)
2. Too Tough to Tame (2003)
3. MacGowan Meets His Match (2004)

=== Man Made in America Series Multi-Author ===
- Deceptions (1986)

=== Virgin Brides Series Multi-Author ===
- Unforgettable Bride (1998)

=== Collections ===
- Spring Fancy (1993) (Surprise, Surprise, Chance Encounter, Simon Says...)
- Maximum Marriage: Men On a Mission (2000)
- Secret Agent Groom (2002)

=== Omnibus In Collaboration ===
- Wild Lady / Circumstantial Evidence / Island on the Hill (1990) (with Dixie Browning and Ann Major)
- Silhouette Christmas Stories (1990) (with Kathleen Eagle, Brooke Hastings and Curtiss Ann Matlock)
- Undercover Lovers (1994) (with Mary Lynn Baxter and Kathleen Korbel)
- Missing Memories: Tall in the Saddle / Forgotten Dream / Hawk's Flight (1995) (with Mary Lynn Baxter and Paula Detmer Riggs)
- Silhouette Summer Sizzlers (1995) (with Justine Davis and Jackie Merritt)
- Wanted: Mother (1996) (with Ginna Gray and Raye Morgan)
- Runaway Brides (1996) (with Debbie Macomber and Paula Detmer Riggs)
- Destined for Love (1998) (with Heather Graham and Kathleen Korbel)
- The Man She Married (1999) (with Emma Darcy and Ann Major)
- Do You Take This Man? (1999) (with Elizabeth Bevarly and Diana Palmer)
- Love Child (2000) (with Justine Davis)
- Take 5, Volume 4 (2001) (with Mary Lynn Baxter and Tess Gerritsen)
- At Her Service (2002) (with Marie Ferrarella)
- Western Rogues (2002) (with Cathy Gillen Thacker)
- Matters of the Heart (2003) (with Ann Major and Pamela Morsi)
- Snowy Nights (2003) (with Heather Graham, Lindsay McKenna and Marilyn Pappano)
- Getaway (2003) (with Stella Bagwell and Kathie DeNosky)
- Man in the Mist / Practice Makes Pregnant (2004) (with Lois Faye Dyer)
- MacGowan Meets His Match / Expecting! (2004) (with Susan Mallery)
- Branded / Fire Still Burns (2004) (with Roxanne St. Claire)
- Double Identity / Sleeping Arrangements (2005) (with Amy Jo Cousins)
- Conveniently Married (2005) (with Jackie Merritt)
- Verdict / What's A Dad to Do? / Father Factor (2005) (with Lilian Darcy and Charlotte Douglas)
- Beckett's Convenient Bride / New Year's Baby / Danger Becomes You (2005) (with Dixie Browning and Kathie DeNosky)
- Memories of You (2005) (with Kate Stevenson)
- Getaway / Home on Leave / Smoky Mountain Christmas / Two's Company (2006) (with Stella Bagwell and Kathie DeNosky)
- A Lover for Christmas (2006) (with Stella Bagwell and Kathie DeNosky)
- Man Means Business / Devlin and the Deep Blue Sea (2007) (with Merline Lovelace)

== See also ==
- List of romantic novelists

== References and Resources ==
- Annette Broadrick's Webpage in Harlequin Enterprises Ltd's Website
- Annette Broadrick's Webpage in Mills & Boon's Website
- Annette Broadrick's Webpage in Fantastic Fiction's Website
