= Leanne Banks =

American writer

- Born: May 14, 1959 (age 67); Roanoke, Virginia, U.S.A.
- Occupation: Novelist
- Writing career
- Period: 1991 - present
- Genre: Romance
- Website: www.leannebanks.com

Leanne Banks (born May 14, 1959) is an American writer of over 60 romance novels since 1991.

== Biography ==
Leanne Banks was born on May 14, 1959, in Roanoke, Virginia.

She published her first novel in 1991, and since then she has received numerous awards and recognitions.

She lives in Richmond, Virginia with her husband.

== Awards ==
- Winner of 1996 Romantic Times Career Achievement Awards in Series Sensuality and Love and Laughter
- Winner of the Florida Writers Beacon Award
- Winner of Golden Quill Award
- Winner of the Georgia Romance Writers' MAGGIE Award
- Winner of Booksellers' Best Award
- Winner of Award of Excellence Contest
- Winner of the National Readers' Choice Awards
- Romance Writers of America Honor Roll

== Bibliography ==
=== Single Novels ===
- Guardian Angel - October 1992, (Loveswept #572)
- Never A Bride - January 1991, (Kismet #26)
- Royal Holiday Baby - October 2010, (Silhouette Special Edition #2075)
- The Doctor Takes A Princess - July 2011, (Silhouette Special Edition #2127)
- The Prince's Texas Bride - May 2011, (Silhouette Special Edition #2115)
- Where There's A Will - October 1991, (Kismet #63)

=== Pendleton Brothers series ===
1. The Fairest of Them All (1992)
2. Dance With the Devil (1993)
3. More Than a Mistress (1994)
4. Playing With Dynamite (1994)
5. For the Love of Sin (1996)

=== Masters Brothers series ===
1. A Date with Dr. Frankenstein (1996)
2. Expectant Father (1996)

=== Sons and Lovers Series ===
- Ridge: The Avenger (1996)

=== Three friends & Bad Boys Club series ===
==== How To Catch a Princess sub-series ====
1. The Five-minute Bride (1997)
2. The Troublemaker Bride (1997)
3. The You-can't-make-me Bride (2000)

==== The Rule Breakers sub-series ====
1. Millionaire Dad (1999)
2. The Lone Rider Takes a Bride (1999)
3. Thirty-day Fiance (1999)
4. Finally Married (2000)

=== Fortune's Children Series Multi-Author ===
- The Secretary and the Millionaire (2000)
- Bride of Fortune (2002)

=== The Logans series ===
1. Her Forever Man (2000)
2. The Doctor Wore Spurs (2000)
3. Expecting His Child (2001)

=== Million Dollar Men series ===
1. Expecting the Boss's Baby (2000)
2. Millionaire Husband (2001)
3. The Millionaire's Secret Wish (2001)

=== The Royal Dumonts series ===
1. Royal Dad (2001)
2. His Majesty, M.D. (2002)
3. Princess in His Bed (2003)
4. The Royal Dumonts (omnibus) (2007)

=== Dynasties the Connellys Series Multi-Author ===
- Tall, Dark and Royal (2002)

=== Dynasties the Barones Series Multi-Author ===
- The Playboy and Plain Jane (2003)

=== Sisters Trilogy ===
1. Some Girls Do (2003)
2. When She's Bad (2003)
3. Trouble in High Heels (2004)

=== Dynasties the Danforths Series Multi-Author ===
- Shocking the Senator (2004)

=== Mantalk Series ===
- Between Duty and Desire (2004)

=== Bellagio Shoe Company series ===
1. Feet First (2005)
2. Underfoot (2006)
3. Footloose (2006)

=== Dynasty the Elliotts Series Multi-Author ===
- Billionaire's Proposition (2006)

=== Cate Madigan series (with Janet Evanovich) ===
1. Hot Stuff (2007)

=== Omnibus in collaboration ===
- The Romance Collection (2000) (with Suzanne Brockmann and Laurie Paige)
- Love Song for a Raven / The Five-Minute Bride (2001) (with Elizabeth Lowell)
- Tempting the Boss (2001) (with Joan Hohl)
- Labor of Love (2002) (with Marie Ferrarella and Sharon Sala)
- Millionaire Bachelors (2002) (with Sheri WhiteFeather)
- Millionaire Marriages (2002) (with Peggy Moreland)
- Tall, Dark and Royal / Maternally Yours (2003) (with Kathie DeNosky)
- Royal Dad / Her Texan Tycoon (2003) (with Jan Hudson)
- His Pregnant Bride / Her Texan Tycoon (2003) (with Jan Hudson and Laurie Paige)
- His Majesty, MD / A Cowboy's Pursuit (2003) (with Anne McAllister)
- Amber by Night / Princess in His Bed (2003) (with Sharon Sala)
- Home for the Holidays (2003) (with Dixie Browning and Kathie DeNosky)
- The Playboy and Plain Jane / Sleeping Beauty's Billionaire (2003) (with Caroline Cross)
- Almost to the Altar (2004) (with Christine Rimmer)
- Between Duty and Desire / Persuading the Playboy King (2004) (with Kristi Gold)
- Rancher in Her Stocking / Italian's Virgin Bride (2004) (with Trish Morey)
- Royal Dad / Unmasking the Maverick Prince (2004) (with Kristi Gold)
- Red Hot Santa (2005) (with Cherry Adair, Pamela Britton and Kelsey Roberts)
- Between Duty and Desire / Meeting at Midnight (2005) (with Eileen Wilks)
- Terms of Surrender / Shocking the Senator (2005) (with Shirley Rogers)
- Expecting Baby (2006) (with Jan Hudson)
- Billionaire's Proposition / Taking Care of Business (2006) (with Lisa Jackson)
- Daniel, Brett and Catherine: The Connellys (2007) (with Catherine Cross and Kathie DeNosky)
