= Joan Hohl =

American novelist

- Born: June 13, 1935; United States
- Died: June 16, 2017 (aged 82); Pennsylvania, U.S.
- Occupation: Novelist
- Spouse: Marv
- Children: 2
- Writing career
- Pen name: Paula Roberts, Amii Lorin, Joan Hohl
- Period: 1980–present
- Genre: Romance
- Notable work: Much Needed Holiday
- Notable awards: Golden Medallion – Short Contemporary Romance; 1986 Much Needed Holiday

Joan Hohl (June 13, 1935 – June 16, 2017) was an American writer of over 60 romance novels starting in 1980. She signed her novels as Paula Roberts and Amii Lorin. She was a recipient of the Romance Writers of America Golden Medallion.

== Biography ==
Joan Hohl was born in the United States, June 13, 1935. She worked at several jobs, some sales clerking, but primarily factory work.

At 40, she began writing, and three years later she published her first novel. She is considered by many in the business a trailblazer in sensuous romance writing, and having been one of the first, if not the first, author to write male point of view in category romance novels.

Joan lived in eastern Pennsylvania, with her husband Marv; they had two daughters, Lori and Amy, and two grandchildren, Erica and Cammeron. She died on June 16, 2017, aged 82 in Pennsylvania.

== Bibliography ==
=== As Paula Roberts ===
==== Single novels ====
- Come Home to Love (1980)

=== As Amii Lorin ===
==== Single novels ====
- Morning Rose, Evening Savage (1980)
- The Tawny Gold Man (1980)
- Game is Played (1981)
- Morgan Wade's Woman (1981)
- Breeze off the Ocean (1981)
- Snowbound Weekend (1982)
- Gambler's Love (1982)
- While the Fire Rages (1984)
- Candleglow (1984)
- Power and Seduction (1985)
- Night Striker (1986)

==== Collections ====
- Snowbound Weekend / Gambler's Love (1994)
- Breeze Off the Ocean / Morgan Wade's Woman (1994)

==== Omnibus In Collaboration ====
- Tale of Love / Power and Seduction (1992) (with Lori Copeland)

=== As Joan Hohl ===
==== Thorne's Series ====
1. Thorne's Way (1983)
2. Thorne's Wife (1989)

==== Single novels ====
- A Taste for Rich Things (1984)
- Much Needed Holiday (1985)
- The Scent of Lilacs (1985)
- Someone Waiting (1985)
- Nevada Silver (1986)
- Texas Gold (1986)
- California Copper (1986)
- Falcon's Flight (1987)
- Lady Ice (1987)
- One Tough Hombre (1987)
- Forever Spring (1988)
- Moments Harsh, Moments Gentle (1988)
- Window on Yesterday (1988)
- Silhouette Summer Sizzlers (1988)
- Christmas Stranger (1989)
- Breeze Off the Ocean (1990)
- Convenient Husband (1992)
- Silver Thunder (1992)
- Lyon's Cub (1992)
- Compromises (1995)
- Another Spring (1996)
- Compromise (1997)
- Ever After (1999)
- Maybe Tomorrow (1999)
- Something Special (2000)
- Come Home to Love (2000)
- My Own (2000)
- Shadow's Kiss (2001)
- Irresistible (2002)
- More Than Anything (2002)
- Simply Wonderful (2003)
- Someday Soon (2004)
- Cutting Through (2005)
- Maverick (2007)

==== Born in the USA Series Multi-Author ====
- Thorne's Wife (1989)

==== Windows Series ====
1. Window on Today (1989)
2. Window on Tomorrow (1989)

==== Branson Brothers Series ====
1. The Gentleman Insists (1989)
2. Handsome Devil (1990)

==== Men at Work Series Multi-Author ====
- Handsome Devil (1990)

==== Big, Bad Wolfe Series ====
1. Wolfe Waiting (1993)
2. Wolfe Watching (1994)
3. Wolfe Wanting (1994)
4. Wolfe Wedding (1995)
5. Wolfe Winter (1998)
- Big Bad Wolfe: Ready to Wed? (collection) (1999)
- Big, Bad Wolfe, At the Altar! (collection) (2000)
- Double Wolfe: Wolfe Winter / Wolfe Wonder (2004)

==== Grainger Series ====
1. A Memorable Man (1996)
2. The Dakota Man (2000)
3. A Man Apart (2005)

==== Collections ====
- The Best of Joan Hohl: Tawny Gold Man / Morning Rose, Evening Savage (1989)
- The Best of Joan Hohl: While the Fire Rages / The Game Is Played (1989)
- Snowbound Weekend / Gambler's Love (1994)
- I Do (2001)
- Never Say Never (2002)

==== Omnibus In Collaboration ====
- Christmas Classics (1989) (with Emilie Richards)
- A Christmas Collection (1992) (with Stella Cameron, Loretta Chase and Linda Lael Miller) (Greatest Gift / Falling Stars / Scent of Snow / Footsteps in the Snow)
- Love Beyond Time (1994) (with Bobby Hutchinson, Evelyn Rogers and Bobbi Smith)
- A Family Christmas (1997) (with Elizabeth Bevarly and Marilyn Pappano)
- A Daddy Again (1998) (with Dixie Browning and Dorothy Glenn)
- Carried Away (2000) (with Kasey Michaels)
- Tempting the Boss (2001) (with Leanne Banks)
- Winter Loving (2001) (with Diana Palmer)
- Delivered by Christmas (2002) (with Linda Howard and Sandra Steffen) (Bluebird Winter / Gift of Joy / Christmas to Treasure)
- Winter Nights (2002) (with Rebecca Brandewyne, Ginna Gray and Ann Major)
- Double Exposure / Playing Games / The Gift of Joy (2005) (with Dianne Drake and Vicki Lewis Thompson)
- A Man Apart / Hot to the Touch (2006) (with Jennifer Greene)
- Men Made in America Vol 6 (with Cheryl St. John, Barbara Bretton, Allison Leigh and Marisa Carroll)

== Awards ==
- 1986 - Romance Writers of America Golden Medallion, Short Contemporary Romance – Much Needed Holiday
