= Diana Palmer (author) =

American romance novelist

Susan Eloise Spaeth Kyle
- Born: Susan Eloise Spaeth; December 11, 1946 (age 79); Cuthbert, Georgia, U.S.
- Education: Piedmont College
- Occupations: Journalist, novelist
- Spouse: James Edward Kyle (1972)
- Children: 1
- Writing career
- Pen name: Diana Palmer; Susan S. Kyle; Diana Blayne; Katy Currie; Susan Kyle
- Period: 1979–present
- Genre: Romance
- Notable work: Diamond Girl (novel)
- Website: www.dianapalmer.com

Susan Kyle (née Spaeth; born December 11, 1946), known by her pen name Diana Palmer, is an American writer who has published romantic novels since 1979. She has also written romances as Diana Blayne, Katy Currie, and under her married name Susan Kyle and a science fiction novel as Susan S. Kyle.

Before writing fiction, she was a journalist for sixteen years under her birth name. Now, she has over 150 books in print, more of them translated and published around the world. Her novel Diamond Girl was made into a movie that was released in 1998 for television.

== Biography ==
=== Personal life ===
She was born Susan Eloise Spaeth on December 12, 1946, in Cuthbert, Georgia. She was the eldest daughter of Maggie Eloise Cliatt, a nurse and also journalist, and William Olin Spaeth, a college professor. She and her younger sister, Dannis Spaeth (Cole), were raised in Chamblee, Georgia, where Susan graduated from Chamblee High School in 1964. She grew up reading Zane Grey and fell in love with cowboys.

On 9 October 1972, she married James Edward Kyle, with whom she had one son, Blayne Kyle in 1980. Their son married with Christina Clayton (Kyle), they are both graduates of Piedmont College in Demorest, Georgia, and live in Tennessee, and they have a daughter, Selena Marie Kyle, born in February 2009 and a son Donovan Edward Kyle born in September 2012. While thinking for a new story she remembered one of her friends from the past who had an amnesia after a car accident, which gave her a hint for a new twist.

At 54, she went back to college, inspired by her husband who quit his job to pursue his diploma in computer programming. She graduated summa cum laude from Piedmont College, Demorest, Georgia, in 1995 with a major in history and a double minor in Archaeology and Spanish. She was named to two honor societies (the Torch Club and Alpha Chi), and was named to the National Dean's List. In addition to her writing projects, she was working on her master's degree in history at California State University, where she plans on specializing in Native American studies.

She was a member of the Native American Rights Fund, the American Museum of Natural History, the National Cattlemen's Association, the Archaeological Institute of America, the Planetary Society, The Georgia Conservancy, the Georgia Sheriff's Association, and numerous conservation and charitable organizations. Her hobbies include gardening, archaeology, anthropology, iguanas, astronomy and music.

=== Writing career ===
She was a former newspaper reporter, with sixteen years experience on both daily and weekly newspapers, including The Gainesville Times and the now defunct Tri-County Advertiser in Clarkesville, Georgia, before began to write novels seriously. She began selling romance novels in 1979 to MacFadden Romance under the pseudonym Diana Palmer. In 1980, she wrote The Morcai Battalion, a science fiction novel as Susan S. Kyle, continued under the pseudonym Diana Palmer 28 years later. From 1982 to 1990, she wrote by Dell Publishing seven novels under the pseudonym Diana Blayne (her son's name). In 1984, she sold a novel by Silhouette Books under the pseudonym Katy Currie. She also used her married name, Susan Kyle, from 1988 to 1995 to sell seven romance novels to Warner Books.

Now, she only used her most popular pseudonym Diana Palmer and writes for three New York publishing houses: Mira Books (mainstream romances), Silhouette Books (contemporary series romances), and Fawcett Books (historical romances). She has over 150 books in print, more of them translated and published around the world.

Her novel Diamond Girl was made into a movie, released in 1998, for television.

==== Awards ====
Her awards include seven Waldenbooks national sales awards, four B. Dalton national sales awards, two Bookrak national sales awards, a Lifetime Achievement Award for series storytelling from Romantic Times, several Affaire de Coeur awards, and two regional Romance Writers of America awards. In 1998, a Japanese Harlequin reader poll gave her Silhouette Desire novel, The Patient Nurse, its favorite book of the year award. She was listed in numerous publications, including Contemporary Authors by Gale Research, Inc., Twentieth Century Romance and Historical Writers by St. James Press, The Writers Directory by St. James Press, the International Who's Who of Authors and Writers by Meirose Press, Ltd., and Love's Leading Ladies by Kathryn Falk. She had also been awarded the Romantic Times 1992-1993 Career Achievement Award Winner for series storyteller of the year. She had also been invited to speak at Romance conventions; Palmer presented a session topic, Moving from Series Romance to Mainstream Romance, at the 9th annual Harriet Austin Writers Conference in 2002. In 2012, her alma mater, Piedmont College gave her the award of Distinguished Alumni for her contributions to the field of literature.

== Bibliography ==
=== As Diana Palmer ===
==== Single novels ====
- Now and Forever (1979)
- If Winter Comes (1979)
- At Winter's End (1979)
- Bound by a Promise (1980)
- Dream's End (1980)
- Love on Trial (1980)
- Storm Over the Lake (1980)
- Sweet Enemy (1980)
- To Have and to Hold (1980)
- To Love and to Cherish (1980)
- September Morning (1982)
- Fire and Ice (1983)
- Snow Kisses (1983)
- Diamond Girl (1983)
- Heart of Ice (1984)
- The Rawhide Man (1984)
- Lady Love (1984)
- Roomful of Roses (1984)
- Cattleman's Choice (1985)
- Love By Proxy (1985)
- The Australian (1985)
- After the Music (1986)
- Champagne Girl (1986)
- Eye of the Tiger (1986)
- Loveplay (1986)
- Betrayed by Love (1987)
- The Humbug Man (1987)
- Woman Hater (1988)
- Miss Greenhorn (1990)
- Nelson's Brand (1991)
- The Best Is Yet to Come (1991)
- Trilby (1992)
- Calamity Mom (1993)
- Amelia (1993)
- Nora (1994)
- Noelle (1995)
- That Burke Man (1995)
- Anabelle's Legacy (1996)
- The Patient Nurse (1997)
- Magnolia (1997)
- Mystery Man (1997)
- The Savage Heart (1997)
- The Bride Who Was Stolen (1998)
- Midnight Rider (1998)
- Beloved (1999)
- Circle of Gold (2000)
- Garden Cop (2002)
- The Marrying Kind (2003)
- Before Sunrise (2005)
- Miss Greenhorn (2009)
- Will of Steel (2010)
- The Rancher (2012)

==== Wyoming Men Series ====
1. Wyoming Tough (2011)
2. Wyoming Fierce (2012)
3. Wyoming Bold (2013)
4. Wyoming Strong (2014)
5. Wyoming Rugged (2015)
6. Wyoming Brave (2016)
7. Wyoming Winter (2017)
8. Wyoming Legend (2018)
9. Wyoming Heart (2019)
10. Wyoming True (2020)

==== Whitehall series ====
1. Lacy (1991)
2. The Cowboy and the Lady (1982)
3. Darling Enemy (1983)

==== Friends and Lovers series ====
1. Friends and Lovers (1983)
2. Rage of Passion (1987)

==== Big Spur, Texas series ====
1. Heather's Song (1983)
2. Passion Flower (1985)

==== Soldier of Fortune series ====
1. Soldier of Fortune (1985)
2. The Tender Stranger (1985)
3. Enamored (1988)
4. Mercenary's Woman (2000)
5. The Winter Soldier (2001)
6. The Last Mercenary (2001)

==== Rawhide and Lace series ====
1. Rawhide and Lace (1986)
2. Unlikely lover (1986)

==== Blake Donovan series ====
1. Fit for a King (1987)
2. Reluctant Father (1989)

==== The Men of Medicine Ridge Series ====
1. Circle of Gold (2000)
2. The Wedding in White (2000)
3. Diamond in the Rough (2009)
4. Will of Steel (2010)

==== Long, Tall Texans Series ====
1. The Founding Father (2003)
2. Calhoun (1988)
3. Justin (1988)
4. Tyler (1989)
5. Sutton's Way (1989)
6. Ethan (1990)
7. Connal (1990)
8. Harden (1991)
9. Evan (1991)
10. Donavan (1992)
11. Emmet (1992)
12. Regan's Pride (1994)
13. That Burke Man (1995)
14. Redbird (1995)
15. Coltrain's Proposal (1996)
16. Paper Husband (1996)
17. A Long Tall Texan Summer (1997)
18. Christmas Cowboy (1997)
19. The Princess Bride (1998)
20. Beloved (1999)
21. Callaghan's Bride (1999)
22. Love with a Long, Tall Texan (1999)
23. Matt Caldwell: Texas Tycoon (2000)
24. The Texas Ranger (2001)
25. A Man of Means (2002)
26. Lionhearted (2002)
27. Man in Control (2003)
28. Lawless (2003)
29. Cattleman's Pride (2004)
30. Renegade (2004) = One Night in New York (2006)
31. Carrera's Bride (2003)
32. Boss Man (2005)
33. Outsider (2006)
34. Heartbreaker (2006)
35. Lawman (2007)
36. Winter Roses (2007)
37. Iron Cowboy (2008)
38. Fearless (2008)
39. Heart of Stone (2008)
40. Heartless (2009)
41. The Maverick (2009)
42. Tough to tame (2010)
43. Dangerous (2010)
44. Merciless (2011)
45. True Blue (2011)
46. Courageous (2012)
47. Protector (2013)
48. Invincible (2014)
49. Texas Born (2014)
50. Untamed (2015)
51. Defender (2016)
52. Undaunted (2017)
53. Unbridled (2018)
- Long, Tall Texans 2 (omnibus) (1995)
- Long, Tall Texans III (omnibus) (1997)
- Emmett Regan and Burke (omnibus) (1999)
- Calhoun / Justin / Tyler (omnibus) (2001)
- Long, Tall Texan Weddings (omnibus) (2001)
- Redbird / Cattleman's Pride (omnibus) (2004)
- Burke and Coltrain: That Burke Man / Coltrain's Proposal (omnibus) (2005)
- Emmett and Regan: Emmett / Regan's Pride (omnibus) (2005)
- The Hart Brothers Rey and Leo (omnibus) (2005)
- The Hart Brothers Simon and Callaghan (omnibus) (2005)

==== Marist series ====
1. His Girl Friday (1989)
2. Hunter (1990)

==== The Case of the Most Wanted series ====
1. The Case of the Mesmerizing Boss (1992)
2. The Case of the Confirmed Bachelor (1992)
3. The Case of the Missing Secretary (1992)

==== Night of Love series ====
1. Night of Love (1993)
2. King's Ransom (1993)
3. Secret Agent Man (1994)
- Man Of The Hour: Night Of Love / Secret Agent Man (omnibus) (2008)

==== Maggie's Dad series ====
1. Maggie's Dad (1995)
2. Man of Ice (1996)
- Maggie's Dad and Man of Ice (omnibus) (2004)

==== Hutton & Co. series ====
1. Once in a Paris (1998)
2. Paper Rose (1999)
3. Lord of the Desert (2000)
4. The Texas Ranger (2001)
5. Desperado (2002)
- Once in Paris / Rage of Passion / Paper Rose (omnibus) (2000)

==== The Morcai Battalion Series ====
1. The Morcai Battalion (1980, as Susan S. Kyle) - (2008, expanded version as Diana Palmer)
2. The Morcai Battalion: The Recruit (2009 November) (as Susan S. Kyle, ebook)
3. The Morcai Battalion: Invictus (2010 November) (as Susan S. Kyle, ebook)
4. The Morcai Battalion: The Rescue (2017 March)
5. The Morcai Battalion: The Pursuit (2018 March)

==== Men At Work series multi-author ====
- Hoodwinked (1989)

==== Montana Mavericks series multi-author ====
- Rogue Stallion (1994)

==== Omnibus ====
- Encore Romances: Three Complete Love Stories (1979)
- Storm Over the Lake / to Have and to Hold / Sweet Enemy (1979)
- If Winter Comes / Now and Forever (1990)
- Storm over the Lake / To Love and Cherish (1990)
- Sweet Enemy / Love on Trial (1990)
- After the Music / Dreams End (1990)
- Bound by a Promise / Passion Flower (1990)
- To Have and to Hold / The Cowboy and the Lady (1990)
- Rawhide and Lace and Unlikely Lover (1992)
- Cowboy and the Lady / Passion Flower / After the Music (1993)
- Christmas Memories (1994)
- Soldiers of Fortune (2000)
- Weddings in White (2000)
- Brides to Be (2002)
- Texans at Heart (2003)
- Champagne Girl / Mystery Man (2004)
- Men of the West (2004)
- The Men of Medicine Ridge (2004)
- Boss Man / The Rugged Loner (2006)
- Bound by Honor (2006)
- Heart of a Stranger (2006)
- A Matter of Trust (2006)
- Second Chances (2006)
- Heart of Winter (2006)
- Hard To Handle (2007)
- Big Sky Winter (2008)
- Her Kind of Hero (2009)

==== Anthologies in collaboration ====
- Now and Forever / Meeting At Midnight / Castaway Heart (1979) (with Sandra Phillipson and Heather Shaw)
- Silhouette Christmas Stories 1987 (1987) (with Dixie Browning, Ginna Gray and Linda Howard)
- Silhouette Summer Sizzlers, Book 2 (1990) (with Patricia Coughlin and Sherryl Woods)
- To Mother With Love '93 (1993) (with Judith Duncan and Debbie Macomber)
- Lover Come Back (1994) (with Patricia Gardner Evans and Lisa Jackson)
- Brave Hearts (1994) (with Kathleen Eagle, Heather Graham)
- Abduction and Seduction (1995) (with Rebecca Brandewyne, Joan Johnston)
- Love's Legacy Omnibus (1996) (with Madeline Baker, Mary Balogh, Elaine Barbieri, Lori Copeland, Cassie Edwards, Heather Graham, Catherine Hart, Virginia Henley, Penelope Neri and Janelle Taylor)
- A Baby? Maybe (1996) (with Marie Ferrarella, Ann Major)
- Husbands on Horseback (1996) (with Margaret Way)
- Royal Weddings (1996) (with Kathleen Korbel and Marion Smith Collins)
- Harlequin (1997) (with Linda Howard, Debbie Macomber)
- Lone Star Christmas (1997) (with Joan Johnston)
- The Father Factor (1998) (with Debbie Macomber, Ann Major)
- Do You Take This Man? (1998) (with Elizabeth Bevarly, Annette Broadrick)
- The Power of Love (1999) (with Jayne Ann Krentz, Debbie Macomber)
- Montana Brides (1999) (with Ann Major, Susan Mallery)
- Lone Star Christmas... and Other Gifts (1999) (with Joan Johnston)
- Take This Man (2000) (with Marie Ferrarella and Nora Roberts)
- Tender Love Stories (2001) (with Patricia Knoll, Debbie Macomber)
- Winter Loving (2001) (with Joan Hohl)
- Crowned Hearts (2001) (with Joan Elliott Pickart and Linda Turner)
- With a Southern Touch (2002) (with Jennifer Blake, Heather Graham)
- Unlikely Alliances (2002) (with Linda Howard and Sharon Sala)
- A Man of Means / The Millionaire's Pregnant Bride (2003) (with Dixie Browning)
- Blessings in Disguise (2003) (with Loree Lough and Lenora Worth)
- A Hero's Kiss (2003) (with Mary Burton and Judith Stacy)
- Man in Control / Tempting the Tycoon (2003) (with Cindy Gerard)
- Lionhearted / Instinctive Male (2004) (with Cait London)
- Men of Honour (2004) (with Suzanne Brockmann)
- Man in Control / Thorn's Challenge (2004) (with Brenda Jackson)
- The Millionaire Affair (2004) (with Tracy Sinclair)
- More Than Words (2004) (with Susan Mallery, Carla Neggers, Brenda Novak and Emilie Richards)
- Cattleman's Pride / Wild in the Moonlight (2005) (with Jennifer Greene)
- Motherhood (2005) (with Elizabeth Bevarly, Candace Camp)
- Irresistible (2005) (with Linda Howard)
- Under the Mistletoe (2006) (with Joan Johnston)
- She Needs a Hero (2006) (with Ginna Gray)
- Boss Man / Tanner Ties (2006) (with Peggy Moreland)
- Bachelor Heroes (2006) (with Merline Lovelace)
- One Hot Summer (2007) (with Joan Johnston, Barbara McCauley)
- Heartbreaker / Scandals from the Third Bride (2007) (with Sara Orwig)
- One of a Kind (2008) (with Suzanne Brockmann)
- Iron Cowboy / Seduced by the Rich Man (2008) (with Maureen Child)
- Married by Christmas (2008) (with Louise Allen, Catherine George)
- Cattleman's Woman (2008) (with Maureen Child, Anne McAllister)
- Heart of Stone / Falling for the Lone Wolf (2008) (with Crystal Green)
- Silent Night Man / Christmas Reunion / Mistletoe Masquerade (2008) (with Louise Allen, Catherine George)

=== As Susan S. Kyle ===
(reedited as Diana Palmer)

==== The Morcai Battalion Series ====
1. The Morcai Battalion (1980) - (2008, expanded version as Diana Palmer)
2. The Morcai Battalion: The Recruit (2009 November) (ebook)
3. The Morcai Battalion: Invictus (2010 November) (ebook)

==== Lovestruck! series multi-author ====
- Fire Brand (1989)

==== Single Novels ====
- Diamond Spur (1988)
- Night Fever (1990)
- True Colors (1991)
- Escapade (1992)
- After Midnight (1993)
- All that Glitters (1995)

=== As Diana Blayne ===
(reedited as Diana Palmer)

==== Single Novels ====
- A Waiting Game (1982)
- A Loving Arrangement (1983)
- White Sand, Wild Sea (1983)
- Dark Surrender (1984)
- Color Love Blue (1984) = Night of the unicorn
- Denim and Lace (1986)
- Tangled Destinies (1986)

=== As Katy Currie ===
(reedited as Diana Palmer)

==== Single Novel ====
- Blind Promises (1984)

=== Non-fiction ===
- "Let Me Tell You About My Readers" essay in Dangerous Men and Adventurous Women: Romance Writers on the Appeal of the Romance (1992, ISBN 0-8122-3192-9, 0-8122-1411-0)

== References and sources ==
- Diana Palmer's Official Website
- Diana Palmer at eHarlequin
- Diana Palmer at Mills & Boon
