= Colleen Shannon (novelist) =

American novelist

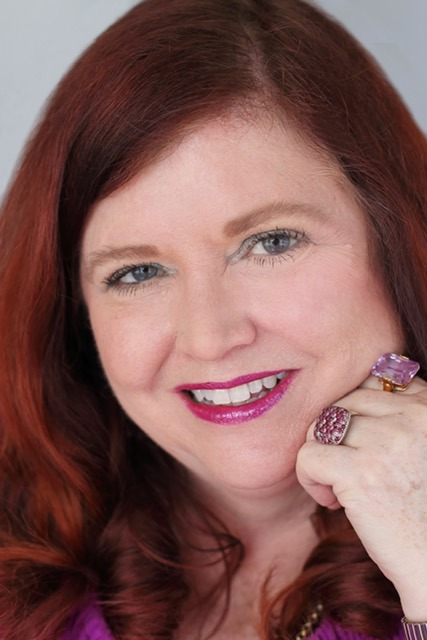
- Shannon in 2019
- Born: Colleen Fuglaar; May 19, 1955 (age 71)
- Education: University of Texas at Austin; University of Southern California; UCLA
- Occupations: Novelist, screenwriter
- Writing career
- Pen name: Colleen Shannon
- Genres: Romance, historical fiction, suspense

Colleen Fuglaar (born May 19, 1955), known professionally as Colleen Shannon, is an American novelist and screenwriter. Her works include Midnight Rider (1989), which received the Romantic Times Reviewer’s Choice Award for Best Western Adventure. She is the author of eighteen romance novels. Her work often blend historical fiction with romantic and political themes.

== Education and career ==
Shannon earned a Bachelor of Arts in Archaeology from the University of Texas at Austin. In 2003, she completed a Master of Real Estate Development at the University of Southern California. Shannon also studied screenwriting at UCLA.

Shannon began writing in her mid-twenties. She published her first novel Wild Heart Tamed through Berkley Books in 1986. Her novels often incorporate real historical settings and themes, such as early American naval history and the Barbary Wars.

Among her most notable works is Midnight Rider (1989), which won the Romantic Times Reviewer’s Choice Award for Best Western Adventure. Her 1996 novel, The Gentle Beast, reimagined the Beauty and the Beast story. The Hawk’s Lady is listed in the digital records of the Library of Congress.

In the 2010s, she published the Texas Ranger romantic suspense series, which included Foster Justice (2014), Sinclair Justice (2016), and Travis Justice (2016).

Shannon later began writing screenplays, including adaptations of her own novels. Among her original screenplays are Michelangelo and Me, based on her novel Heaven’s Rogue, and Full Circle.

== Selected works ==
=== Novels ===
- Wild Heart Tamed (1986)
- The Tender Devil (1987)
- The Hawk's Lady (1989)
- Midnight Rider (1989)
- Surrender the Night (1992)
- Golden Fires (1993)
- The Gentle Beast (1996)
- Prince of Kisses (1997)
- The Steadfast Heart (1998)
- Heaven's Rogue (1999)
- Heaven's Hero (2000)
- The Wolf of Haskell Hall (2001)
- The Trelayne Inheritance (2002)
- Catspell (2006)
- Foster Justice (2014)
- Sinclair Justice (2016)
- Travis Justice (2016)

== Awards and reception ==
- 1996 - Romantic Times Reviewers' Choice Award, British Isles Historical Romance – The Gentle Beast
