= Gayle Callen =

American author

- Born: Gayle Ann Kloecker
- Occupation: Author
- Children: 3
- Writing career
- Pen name: Emma Cane; Julia Latham; Gwen Rowley
- Genre: Romance

Gayle Callen (born Gayle Ann Kloecker) is an American author of more than 40 romance novels. She writes as Emma Cane for her contemporary novels. She has written as Julia Latham for her medieval historical series and as Gwen Rowley for an Arthurian novel.

== Biography and awards ==
A USA Today bestselling author, Gayle Callen has written historical and contemporary romances for Avon Books.

Named the "Notable New Author of 1999," Gayle has also won the Holt Medallion, the Laurel Wreath Award, the Booksellers' Best Award, the National Readers Choice Award and was a nominee for the RT Book Reviews Magazine's Reviewers' Choice Award. Her books have been translated into eleven different languages. She also writes contemporary romance as Emma Cane.

She resides in a suburb of Central New York with her husband. Now that her three children are grown, she has time to read, sing, travel, crochet, and delve too deeply into historical research. A past President of the Central New York Romance Writers, she is also a member of Romance Writers of America and Novelists Inc.

== Bibliography ==
=== Books written as Gayle Callen ===
- The Groom Wore Plaid (2016 Avon Books ISBN 978-0-06-226800-6)
- The Wrong Bride (2015, Avon Books ISBN 978-0-06-226798-6)
- Redemption of the Duke (2014, Avon Books ISBN 978-0-06-226796-2)
- Surrender to the Earl (2013, Avon Books ISBN 978-0-06-207607-6)
- Return of the Viscount (2012, Avon Books ISBN 978-0-06-207606-9)
- Every Scandalous Secret (2011, Avon Books ISBN 978-0-06-178345-6)
- A Most Scandalous Engagement (2010, Avon Books ISBN 978-0-06-178344-9)
- In Pursuit of a Scandalous Lady (2010, Avon Books ISBN 978-0-06-178341-8)
- Never Marry a Stranger (2009, Avon Books ISBN 978-0-06-123507-8)
- Never Dare a Duke (2008, Avon Books ISBN 978-0-06-123506-1)
- Never Trust a Scoundrel (2008, Avon Books ISBN 978-0-06-123505-4)
- The Viscount in Her Bedroom (2007, Avon Books ISBN 9780060784133)
- The Duke in Disguise (2006, Avon Books ISBN 0-06-078412-1)
- The Lord Next Door (2005, Avon Books ISBN 0-06-078411-3)
- A Woman's Innocence. (2005, Avon Books ISBN 0-06-054396-5)
- The Beauty and the Spy (2004, Avon Books ISBN 0-06-054395-7)
- No Ordinary Groom (2004, Avon Books ISBN 0-06-054394-9)
- His Bride (2002, Avon Books ISBN 0-380-82110-9)
- His Scandal (2002, Avon Books ISBN 0-380-82109-5)
- Hot and Bothered (Anthology) (2001, St. Martin's Press ISBN 0-312-97968-1)
- His Betrothed (2001, Avon Books ISBN 0-380-81377-7)
- My Lady's Guardian (2000, Avon Books ISBN 0-380-81376-9)
- A Knight's Vow (1999, Avon Books ISBN 0-380-80494-8)
- The Darkest Knight (1999, Avon Books ISBN 0-380-80493-X)

=== Books written as Emma Cane ===
- Ever After at Sweetheart Ranch (2015, Avon Books. ISBN 978-0-06-232342-2)
- Sleigh Bells in Valentine Valley (2014, Avon Books. ISBN 978-0-06-2323408)
- When the Rancher Came to Town (A Novella) (2014, Avon Impulse. ISBN 978-0-06-2369529)
- A Promise at Bluebell Hill (2014, Avon Books. ISBN 978-0-06-224253-2)
- The Cowboy of Valentine Valley (2014, Avon Books. ISBN 978-0-06-2242518)
- All I Want for Christmas Is a Cowboy, An Anthology with "A Christmas Cabin" Novella (Avon Impulse. ISBN 978-0-06-2284723)
- A Wedding in Valentine (A Novella) (2013, Avon Impulse. ISBN 978-0-06-2264657)
- True Love at Silver Creek Ranch (2013, Avon Books. ISBN 978-0-06-210229-4)
- A Town Called Valentine (2012, Avon Books. ISBN 978-0-06-210227-0)

=== Books written as Julia Latham ===
- Sin and Surrender (2011, Avon Books. ISBN 978-0-06-178348-7)
- Wicked, Sinful Nights (2010, Avon Books. ISBN 978-0-06-178346-3)
- Taken and Seduced (2009, Avon Books. ISBN 978-0-06-143300-9)
- Secrets of the Knight (2008, Avon Books. ISBN 978-0-06-143296-5)
- One Knight Only (2007, Avon Books. ISBN 978-0-06-123516-0)
- Thrill of the Knight (2007, Avon Books. ISBN 978-0-06-123515-3)

=== Books written as Gwen Rowley ===
- Knights of the Round Table: Geraint (2007, Jove Books ISBN 978-0-515-14263-1)
