= Rebecca Brandewyne =

American writer

- Born: Mary Rebecca Wadsworth; March 4, 1955 (age 71); Knoxville, Tennessee, U.S.
- Occupation: Novelist
- Spouse(s): Gary Brock (divorced), John Cox (divorced)
- Children: Shane Brock
- Writing career
- Language: English
- Period: 1980–present
- Genre: Romance
- Website: www.brandewyne.com

Rebecca Brandewyne née Wadsworth (born March 4, 1955, in Knoxville, Tennessee, United States) is an American writer of romance novels. Brandewyne has been published in multiple languages in over 60 countries.

== Biography ==
=== Personal life ===
Born Mary Rebecca Wadsworth on March 4, 1955, in Knoxville, Tennessee, United States, to a large family, Brandewyne grew up in Kansas. She has a sister. She married Gary Brock, a musician, and the two had a son, Shane. After divorcing she married again, to John Cox, from whom she is also now divorced.

In August 2006, a Kansas trial court ordered self-publishing company AuthorHouse to pay $240,000 in punitive damage as well as $230,000 in actual damages to Brandewyne for publishing a book by her ex-husband (Paperback Poison: The Romance Writer and the Hit Man) that was "harmful" and libelous of them. AuthorHouse was also ordered to pay $20,000 each to Brandewyne's parents for the damage. Although the court acknowledged that AuthorHouse employed a business model that placed a degree of responsibility for the content of works upon the authors, in this case it found that AuthorHouse had failed to act when it was informed that the book might include libelous content.

Brandewyne has a Bachelors in Journalism, with minors in history and music, and a Masters in Communication.

=== Writing career ===
Brandewyne has written over thirty consecutive bestselling titles. She has won numerous awards form Affaire de Coeur and Romantic Times magazines. Brandewyne has been named one of Love's Leading Ladies and has been inducted into Romantic Times BOOKreviews Hall of Fame.

== Bibliography ==
=== Single novels ===
- No Gentle Love (1980)
- Forever My Love (1982)
- Rose of Rapture (1984)
- The Outlaw Hearts (1986)
- Desire in Disguise (1987)
- Heartland (1990)
- Rainbow's End (1991)
- Desperado (1992)
- Swan Road (1994)
- The Jacaranda Tree (1995)
- Wildcat (1995)
- Dust Devil (1996)
- Presumed Guilty (1996)
- Hired Husband (1996)
- Glory Seekers (1997)
- The Lioness Tamer (1998)
- High Stakes (1999)
- Destiny's Daughter (2001)
- The Love Knot (2003)
- To Die For (2003)
- The Ninefold Key (2004)
- The Crystal Rose (2006)
- From the Mists of Wolf Creek (2009)

=== Aguilar's Fate ===
1. Love Cherish Me (1983)
2. And Gold Was Ours (1984)

=== Chandlers of Highclyffe Hall ===
1. Upon a Moon Dark Moor (1988)
2. Across a Starlit Sea (1989)

=== Chronicles of Tintagel ===
1. Passion Moon Rising (1988)
2. Beyond the Starlit Frost (1991)

=== Omnibus in collaboration ===
- Bewitching Love Stories (1992) (with Shannon Drake, Kasey Michaels and Christina Skye)
- Night Magic (1993) (with Shannon Drake, Jill Gregory and Becky Lee Weyrich)
- Abduction and Seduction (1995) (with Joan Johnston and Diana Palmer)
- New Year's Resolution: Husband (1995) (with Carla Neggers and Anne Stuart)
- A Spring Bouquet (1996) (with Jo Beverley, Janet Dailey and Debbie Macomber)
- The Bounty / A Little Texas Two-Step (2002) (with Peggy Moreland)
- Winter Nights (2002) (with Ginna Gray, Joan Hohl and Ann Major)
- Love Is Murder (2003) (with Maureen Child and Linda Winstead Jones)
- At the Edge (2003) (with Merline Lovelace and Elizabeth Lowell)
- Hired Husband / Millionaire and the Cowgirl (2008) (with Lisa Jackson)
