= Kristi Gold =

American writer

- Born: Unknown; US
- Occupation: Novelist
- Writing career
- Period: 2000 – present
- Genre: Romance
- Website: www.kristigold.com

Kristi Gold is an American writer of over 25 romance novels since 2000.

== Biography ==
Kristi Gold decided at the age of twenty to write her first book. In 2000 her first book was published. Gold is married to a physician, and they have three children. They currently reside in Central Texas.

== Awards ==
- 1996 Romance Writers of America Double Golden Heart Finalist
- 2001 Romance Writers of America RITA Nominee for Best First Book, Cowboy for Keeps
- Romantic Times W.I.S.H. Award
- 2004 National Reader's Choice Winner, Best Short Contemporary Series
- Romantic Times BookClub Reviewer's Choice Winner for 2003, 2004, and 2005 Best Silhouette Desire
- 2004 Romantic Times BookClub Lifetime Achievement Award Nominee for Series Storyteller of the Year
- Seven No. 1 Waldenbook Series Best-sellers

== Bibliography ==
=== For Keeps Series ===
1. Cowboy for Keeps (2000)
2. Doctor for Keeps (2000)

=== Single novels ===
- Her Ardent Sheikh (2001)
- His Sheltering Arms (2001)
- His E-mail Order Wife (2002)
- The Sheikh's Bidding (2003)
- Marooned with a Millionaire (2003)
- Expecting the Sheikh's Baby (2003)
- Fit for a Sheikh (2004)
- Mistaken for a Mistress (2005)
- A Most Shocking Revelation (2005)
- Law of Attraction (2006)
- House of Midnight Fantasies (2006)
- Damage Control (2006)
- Fall from Grace (2007)

=== Marrying An M.D. ===
1. Dr. Dangerous (2002)
2. Dr. Desirable (2002)
3. Dr. Destiny (2002)

=== Royal Wager Series ===
1. Persuading the Playboy King (2004)
2. Unmasking the Maverick Prince (2004)
3. Daring the Dynamic Sheikh (2004)
- Persuading the Playboy King / Unmasking the Maverick Prince (omnibus) (2005)

=== O'Brien Series ===
1. The Pregnancy Negotiation (2006)
2. Executive Seduction (2006)
3. Through Jenna's Eyes (2007)

=== Omnibus in collaboration ===
- Millionaire Men (2002) (with Cindy Gerard)
- Taming Her Man (2002) (with B.J. James)
- Doctors in Demand (2002) (with Meagan McKinney)
- Navy Seal Dad / Dr.Desirable (2002) (with Metsy Hingle)
- The Tycoon's Temptation / Dr. Destiny (2003) (with Katherine Garbera)
- Renegade Millionaire / Cinco (2003) (with Linda Conrad)
- The Royal and the Runaway Bride / His E-mail Order Wife (2003) (with Kathryn Jensen)
- Baby / Desert Warrior (2003) (with Nalina Singh)
- Beckett's Convenient Bride / The Sheikh's Bidding (2004) (with Dixie Browning)
- Marooned with a Millionaire / The Gentrys – Abby (2004) (with Linda Conrad)
- Challenged by the Sheikh: Dynasties: The Danforths (2004) (with Ann Major)
- The Bride Tamer (2004) (with Ann Major)
- Fit for A Sheikh / Shut Up and Kiss Me (2004) (with Sara Orwig)
- Challenged by the Sheikh / Hot Contact (2004) (with Susan Crosby)
- Expecting the Sheikh's Baby / Born to be Wild (2004) (with Anne Marie Winston)
- Between Duty and Desire / Persuading the Playboy King (2004) (with Leanne Banks)
- Royal Dad / Unmasking the Maverick Prince (2004) (with Leanne Banks)
- Taken by Storm (2005) (with Kathie DeNosky and Laura Wright) (Whirlwind / Upsurge / Wildfire)
- Sheik and the Princess Bride / Daring the Dynamic Sheikh (2005) (with Susan Mallery)
- The Boss Man's Fortune / Challenged by the Sheikh (2005) (with Kathryn Jensen)
- Pretending with the Playboy / Fit for a Sheikh (2005) (with Cathleen Galitz)
- Princes of the Desert (2005) (with Alexandra Sellers)
- Betrayed Birthright / Mistaken for a Mistrress (2006) (with Sheri WhiteFeather)
- House of Midnight Fantasies / Rags-to-Riches Wife (2006) (with Metsy Hingle)
- Highly Compromised Position / Most Shocking Revelation (2006) (with Sara Orwig)
- House of Midnight Fantasies / Single Demand (2007) (with Margaret Allison)
- The Connellys: Alexandra, Drew and Tara (2007) (with Cindy Gerard and Muriel Jensen)
- Dangerous Desires (2007) (with Kathie DeNosky and Laura Wright)
- Pregnancy Negotiation / Marriage of Revenge (2007) (with Sheri WhiteFeather)
- Morning-After Proposal / Executive Seduction (2007) (with Sheri WhiteFeather)

== References and sources ==
- Kristi Gold's Official Website
- Kristi Gold at eHarlequin
- Kristi Gold at Mills & Boon
