= Ondine (novel) =

1998 novel by Heather Graham Pozzessere

- First edition book cover (1988)
- Author: Heather Graham Pozzessere (as Shannon Drake)
- Publisher: Ace Books
- Publication date: 1988
- Publication place: United States
- ISBN: 978-0-441-62860-5

Ondine is a 1988 historical romance novel by Heather Graham Pozzessere under the pen name Shannon Drake. It is the story of a lady of 17th century England who finds herself cast from nobility when her father is accused of treason and murdered. As a noose rests at her neck, her one regret is that she did not have a chance to find his killer. She is once again given that chance when Lord Chatham, hoping to use the lady to solve the murder of his wife, takes her hand in marriage to save her from the hangman's rope.

== Plot/setting ==
=== Prologue ===
The novel begins in 1678 during the reign of Charles II of England. To settle a land dispute, Lord Warwick Chatham jousts in the king's court against Lord Hardgrave, his long-standing enemy. Warwick wins the battle and walks to a stream for a drink of water. Here, he first sees Ondine, though he is unsure if she is real. Later in his quarters, Warwick refuses the advances of the lady Anne Fenton. Then, his wife, Genevieve, comes to him because she had a nightmare about Warwick's grandmother, who met a suspicious death. Warwick assures her that he will protect her, yet he is too late to save her as she falls from the window later. Warwick is convinced that she was murdered, but Charles II believes she committed suicide. A year later, Warwick is traveling to his home in North Lambria when he meets a death procession. After asking his coachman, Jake, if it is true that a woman can be saved from the gallows if someone takes her in marriage, he tells him to follow the procession.

=== Part I, Ondine ===
Warwick does not recognize Ondine as the woman he saw in the water only a year before. Ondine is on her way to be hanged for poaching an animal on a lord's property. In the last minutes of her life, Ondine regrets that she could not find the traitor who killed her father and would've killed her had she not run away. She thinks it too good to be true when Warwick saves Ondine from the hangman's rope by marrying her. Her only thought is of leaving him, but after trying to escape once, she realizes that being Warwick's wife can provide her with the protection she needs to devise a plan to clear her father's name. Through constant bickering with Warwick, she is able to play the part of his wife in front of his brother and the servants. Ondine is, however, constantly plagued by nightmares of her father's death by the hands of her step uncle, William, and cousin, Raoul, who threatened to incriminate her as well if she did not marry Raoul. She is also frustrated by her new husband's lack of communication with her about his family history. She learns that his grandmother is rumored to have been murdered by his grandfather's mistress. Later, she discovers that Mathilda was the daughter of her grandfather's affair, and Clinton is Mathilda's son. Warwick constantly dismisses Ondine's temper and frustrations. He tells everyone that she is pregnant hoping to lure out his wife's killer. Ondine knows something else is going on after she hears a voice whispering her name in bedchamber. Overshadowing this fear is the prospect of going to court with Warwick because she does not want to be recognized as a traitor. Despite their bickering, Warwick and Ondine both see glimpses of good in each other and are falling in love.

=== Part II, The Countess of North Lambria The Game Is Played ===
Ondine's fear of going to King Charles II's court is unfounded. As soon as Charles II and her have a moment alone, he informs her that he believes her innocent of treason and encourages her to play Warwick's game then return home to clear her father's name. She plays the game very well much to Warwick's dismay. He becomes jealous of the attention she is giving the king, while she becomes jealous of the Lady Anne's attention to Warwick. Their mutual feelings of frustration result in their finally consummating their marriage. Once back in the Chatham manor, Ondine is attacked by a hooded figure in a mask and pushed into the family tomb. Not sure whom to suspect, Warwick plans another trip to court to lure out the killer. Anne and Lord Hardgrave reveal the truth of Warwick and Ondine's marriage, but Warwick gives a loving speech that has everyone enchanted, not revolted, with the love story. On an outing, Ondine is snatched away by pirates. She suspects Anne and Lord Hardgrave, but there is no proof. After saving Ondine, Warwick immediately rushes her back to the Chatham manor and announces that he will be divorcing Ondine and sending her away the next morning. Ondine is constantly confused by Warwick's actions because she doesn't know that he truly loves her and is pushing her away to protect her. That night, Mathilda drugs Ondine and attempts to hang herself and Ondine to right the history of the family to quiet the ghosts that haunt her mind. She succeeds in killing herself, but Warwick arrives in time to save Ondine. Warwick has changed his mind about sending Ondine away, but she doesn't know this. Ondine leaves the next morning for her home in Rochester to try to clear her father's name.

=== Part III, The Duchess of Rochester Full Circle ===
Ondine returns to her home, Deauveau Place, in the hopes of finding the forged papers that incriminate her and her father. Her step uncle, William, is wary of her, but Raoul is pleased to see her. Ondine agrees to wed Raoul in one month. In the meantime, Warwick has visited Charles II and learned the truth of Ondine's secret. Warwick plans to find a way to stay close to Ondine, and Charles II says that he will plan a visit to Deauveau Place as well. That night Ondine searches William's study but doesn't find anything. After becoming violently ill twice in one night, she realizes she is carrying Warwick's child. At a nearby tavern, Warwick, Clinton, Justin, and Jake inquire about the Deauveau Place. They learn that William is looking for a blacksmith. Warwick decides to apply for the position. Clinton and Justin are to return to court to see if they can find any witnesses to Ondine's father's death, and Jake will stay at the tavern to see what more he can learn. Ondine continues her search for the documents with no luck. Knowing that William wants a physician to examine her, Ondine tells Raoul that while she was gone she had married a peasant. Knowing that she has bought herself some time, she breathes easier until Warwick visits her in her room that night, and she is renewed with fear by the danger he presents to the both of them by being there. Things escalate rapidly after William discovers that Ondine is pregnant. Anne overhears Clinton and Justin speaking to a witness to Ondine's father's murder, and she and Lord Hardgrave immediately set in motion a plan to pay William for Ondine so that Anne may have Warwick to herself. Hardgrave, however, plans to kill Warwick. Jake witnesses their meeting at the tavern and is able to warn Warwick. On the day this is supposed to happen, Ondine meets Warwick so that they may leave together. Raoul walks in on them as they embrace and shoots Warwick. William takes Ondine just as Hardgrave approaches. Hardgrave goes to see Warwick's corpse for himself. Warwick, however, is not dead, and they duel. Warwick kills Hardgrave. In the meantime, Ondine has escaped from William and ran to the woods. Raoul, Warwick, and William follow. Justin and Clinton arrive and follow as well. Raoul refuses to fight Warwick, so William kills his own son; then, Warwick kills William and takes Ondine back into her home to recover. The king arrives, and Ondine learns that the witness has come forward to clear her father's name. The Chatham men and the king go to the tavern where Anne is staying, and the king forces her to marry a governor on a remote Caribbean island.

=== Epilogue ===
Some months later, Warwick and Ondine welcome a baby boy into the world.

== Characters ==
- Lord Warwick Chatham – a lord set on discovering the truth behind his wife's death, weds Ondine and falls in love with her
- Ondine – a lady thrown from nobility by the accusation and murder of her father, weds Warwick and falls in love with him
- King Charles II – Warwick's king and friend, believes Ondine to be innocent
- Lord Hardgrave – Warwick's neighbor and enemy
- Genevieve – Warwick's wife, who meet an untimely death at the beginning of the novel
- Jake – Warwick's personal servant and trusted friend
- Anne Fenton – Warwick occasional lover, a woman he loves to hate
- Mathilda – head housekeeper of the Chatham manor, Warwick's illegitimate aunt
- Justin Chatham – Warwick's charming younger brother
- Clinton – master of the stables at the Chatham manor, Warwick's illegitimate cousin
- Jem – the valet for Deauveau Place, loves Ondine like a daughter and believes her father innocent
- Raoul – Ondine's step cousin, who conspires against her father and whom she is set to marry later in the novel as she tries to clear her father's name
- William – Ondine's step uncle, who conspires against her father and who forces her engagement to his son, Raoul
- Berta – the help that William assigns as Ondine's maid upon her return to Deauveau Place

== Themes ==
=== Nobility/social status ===
The theme of nobility and social status is evident throughout the novel. Ondine finds herself cast from nobility, going from a lady of leisure to a beggar on the street. Before Warwick knows Ondine's true identity, he treats her like less of person. Once he finds out that she is nobility, his views of her change significantly. Before Warwick learns her true identity, Ondine is exceedingly frustrated with the idea of her lowering in social status. "She wanted to cry out that she was a duchess in her own right, that she should have been able to spit at her arrogant earl of a husband's sharply voiced order". The roles are reversed later in the novel when Ondine is back at Deauveau Place as Duchess and Warwick gets himself hired on as the blacksmith.

=== Love/hate ===
A common plot device used in romance novels is to throw two characters together who just can't get along. Such is the case of Ondine and Warwick. Their relationship begins with each of them using the other for his/her own purpose. They argue constantly and find it impossible to even pretend to get along. As the novel progresses, however, their connection becomes stronger as they unexpectedly fall in love. It is at the end of Part I of the novel that Ondine is "[h]ating herself … for loving him").

== Genre ==
=== Romance novel ===
This novel, written and marketed toward the romance genre, has all of the common elements of a romance novel. Two people meet, and push each other away at first, only to have circumstances bring them back together. Along the way, they fall in love, and the ending leaves readers on a pleasant and optimistic note.

=== Mystery fiction ===
Warwick and Ondine are both trying to solve mysteries of their own. Ondine wants uncover her father's killer and clear his name, while Warwick wants to investigate his wife's death. There is also the mystery of the rumored curse surrounding Warwick's family, particularly in the instance of his grandmother's death.

=== Gothic fiction ===
There are many elements of the gothic genre present in Ondine: mysterious deaths, ghosts, secret passageways, masked figures, and darkness.

== Literary allusions ==
=== Beauty and the Beast ===
Warwick is often referred to as a beast, both directly and indirectly. Anne calls Warwick a beast, saying that he is too powerful for the gentle Genevieve. When Ondine is almost hanged, she tells Jake that she would marry a beast of the forest to escape death. Jake affirms that Warwick has been called a beast before. On the first night of their marriage, when Warwick realizes Ondine is trying to escape, he thinks, '"Beauty" was attempting to escape the "beast"'. Later in the novel as Warwick is watching over Ondine, it states, '"Sleep, my beauty," he teased her gently. "For your 'beast' is standing guard"'. References such as these are present throughout the entire novel.

=== Ondine in mythology ===
In myths, Ondine refers to a water nymph or a mermaid. The first time Warwick sees Ondine, she jumps into a stream and disappears into the water. Later, he wonders if saw a mermaid or if he even truly saw anything. When Justin first meets Ondine and learns her name, he says, "Ever so surely a name of magical connotation, a creature of magical beauty!". Later in the novel, it states, "Ondine, a mythical creature, granted eternal life through marriage to a mortal". Allusions like these are present throughout the entire novel.

== Publishing information ==
=== First edition ===
Ace Books

ISBN 0-441-62860-5

ISBN 978-0-441-62860-5

Copyright 1988

=== Second edition ===
Second edition book cover (1997)

Zebra Books

ISBN 0-8217-5414-9

ISBN 978-0-8217-5414-6

Copyright 1997

The author and her husband posed for the cover art of this edition.
