= To Die For (novel) =

2004 novel by Linda Howard

- Author: Linda Howard
- Language: English
- Series: Blair Mallory Series
- Genre: Romance, suspense
- Publisher: Random House Publishing
- Publication date: December 28, 2004
- Publication place: United States
- Media type: Print (hardback & paperback)
- Pages: 384
- Followed by: Drop Dead Goregous

To Die For is an American novel by Linda Howard. It was published in 2004 by Random House Publishing. It made the New York Times Best Seller list. It is the first book in the Blair Mallory Series, followed by Drop Dead Gorgeous.

== Plot summary ==
Blair Mallory is the owner of a fitness center named Great Bods. She got the money to open the fitness club from the divorce of her first husband Jason Carson. Blair caught Jason kissing her underage sister Jenni at a family get-together. Blair knew he wanted to run for congressman so, for the ultimate revenge, she snapped a picture of the two kissing. Jason, knowing the picture would ruin him, paid her a bundle in the divorce.

She begins to notice that one of her members, Nicole, has been copying everything she has done. She begins to wear her hair like Blair, dressing like Blair, and even buys the same style of car as Blair. Blair isn't the only one who has a problem with Nicole: Almost all the women in the gym do not like Nicole, as she hogs the machines, is mean to other members, and openly flirts with the married men in the gym. After many complaints, Blair sits her down and tells her that her membership will not be renewed for another year. Nicole becomes furious and threatens to sue Blair. Blair is always the last one to leave the gym so as she is about to walk out the door to her car she notices Nicole waiting for her in the parking lot. Blair becomes scared and makes a run for the car with her phone ready to dial 911. She hears a gunshot and instinctively hits the ground, dropping her cellphone underneath the car so that Blair is unable to call for help. She tries to stay quiet so that Nicole won't realize she didn't hit Blair but, after a while, she thinks maybe Nicole left and makes a run for the door to the gym. She makes it into the gym safely where she goes to her office and dials 911. The police arrive and Blair tells the officers the story. They inform her that Nicole didn't kill her because Nicole was murdered.

She then hears the voice of her ex-boyfriend, Wyatt Bloodsworth. He is a police lieutenant and came after hearing the case over the radio. Blair is immediately brought back to the memories of the three dates they went on two years ago. He begins to question Blair and lets her know she is no longer a suspect. Wyatt takes her home and, due to the stress, she decides she wants to go to the beach. She rents a condo and spends the day relaxing on the beach, eventually falling asleep. She wakes up to someone carrying her. Blair begins to freak out until she realizes that it is Wyatt. He carries her back to her condo. She is very frustrated when he tells her that he found her by looking at her credit card transactions. He then kisses her and all her feelings for him come rushing back. She agrees that they can start over and try their relationship again.

The next day they head home and Wyatt takes her back to her car, still at the gym. As she is about to get in her car, she feels a piercing pain in her arm; she falls to the ground and sees another car driving away. She realizes she has been shot. Wyatt calls the station, reports the crime, and calls an ambulance. Blair is taken to the hospital where they tell her she is going to be okay: It was just a flesh wound. That night Blair goes to Wyatt's. They figure out that a man named Dwyane Bailey is the killer behind Nicole's murder. They bring him into the station for questioning. He admits to killing Nicole but not the attacks on Blair. The next day she is driving, approaching a traffic light, and when she tries to hit the brakes the pedal goes to the floor. Her brakes were cut, and she is going full-speed into the intersection. She goes to the hospital where they tell her she's going to be okay, just sore.

Blair and Wyatt go back to his house where he gets a call that Dwayne's alibi checks out for the times of Blair's attacks. They rethink who could be the killer. The next day, she comes downstairs feeling better and Wyatt tosses her a small velvet box. He gets on one knee and asks him to marry her. She says yes. They begin to get ready because she is going to the precinct with Wyatt. She arrives and sits in his office for the day making a list of potential suspects. He comes rushing in saying that all the detectives have been called to a location but can't give any details. She is alone in Wyatt's office when she sees a familiar face: Jason's. He pulls out a gun and tells her to be quiet. Blair isn't that scared because she doesn't think he will be able to go through with it. Jason tells her his new wife, Debra, was the one who shot at her in the parking lot. She came home and told him; he got worried that she would get caught and ruin his chance at being a congressman. So he decided to kill her himself by cutting her brake line. Since that didn't work, he called in a fake report of a crime being committed to get the police out of the station so he could kill Blair. Just then Debra walks in because she followed Jason here. She is convinced that they are having an affair until Blair tells her that Jason came here to kill her. Surprisingly, this shows Debra that Jason really loves her and becomes happy. Blair decides that this is the perfect time to get the gun from Jason, and she kicks it out of his hands. Just as Blair is doing so, the S.W.A.T team arrives, arresting Jason and Debra. Blair and Wyatt are really together for the first time.

== Other characters ==
- Jason Carson is Blair's first husband.
- Jenni Mallory is the younger sister of Blair.
- Nicole is the woman at the gym who begins to copy every move Blair does.
- Dwayne Bailey is the married man that Nicole is seeing and Nicole's killer.
- Debra Carson is Jason's new wife.
- Siana Mallory is Blair's older sister, a lawyer.
- Mrs. Bloodsworth is Wyatt's mom and a member of Great Bods.

== Critical reception ==
Publishers Weekly says that Linda Howard "brings her usual high level of intelligence and flair to her latest tale of romantic suspense." However, they did note that the plot by the middle begins "to stall" because the suspense dies for a few chapters and reading Blair and Wyatt's bickering gets old. One Amazon customer wrote in a review that "this novel has plenty of romance, but is overflowing with suspense that will keep you on the edge of your seat." One user on the website The Best Reviews wrote that although she liked the book she found the "first person writing to be redundant." However, she does like the book and calls Howard's writing "classy."
