= Mary Burrus Williams =

American writer

- Born: September 5, 1941 (age 84); Elizabeth City, North Carolina, United States
- Occupation: Novelist
- Spouse: Dennis
- Writing career
- Pen name: Bronwyn Williams
- Period: 1988–2005
- Genre: Historical romance

Mary Burrus Williams (born September 5, 1941) is the co-author with her sister, Dixie Burrus Browning, of historical novels under the pen name Bronwyn Williams.

Williams is the youngest of four children of the late Major League baseball player Maurice "Dick" Burrus and his wife Rebecca Stevens.

== Biography ==
Williams was born September 5, 1941, in Elizabeth City, North Carolina, also the birthplace of her mother. At two weeks of age, she returned with her mother to Hatteras Island, North Carolina, where the Burrus family lived for generations. Williams has two sisters, Dixie and Sara, and one brother, Steve, now deceased.

Williams married Dennis Williams of Kinnakeet, North Carolina, in 1960. Dennis served in the United States Coast Guard for thirty years. After retirement, the couple returned to their Hatteras Island home.

In 1988, Williams and Dixie published their first historical romance, White Witch, under the pseudonym Bronwyn Williams (a combination of their married names).
