= Dixie Browning =

American artist and writer (1930–2024)

Dixie Burrus Browning
- Born: Dixie Burrus; September 9, 1930; North Carolina, United States
- Died: June 11, 2024 (aged 93)
- Occupations: Novelist, illustrator
- Spouse: Leonard "Lee" Browning
- Children: 2
- Parent: Dick Burrus (father)
- Relatives: Mary Burrus Williams (sister)Sara Burrus Shoemaker(sister) Stephen Burrus (brother)
- Writing career
- Pen name: Zoe Dozier, Dixie Browning, Bronwyn Williams (with her sister Mary Burrus Williams)
- Period: 1976–present
- Genre: Romance
- Notable work: Renegade Player
- Notable awards: RITA award – Contemporary Sweet Romance; 1983 Renegade Player
- Website: www.dixiebrowning.com

Dixie Browning, née Burrus (September 9, 1930 – June 11, 2024) was an American artist and writer of over 100 romance novels. She also published under the pen name Zoe Dozier, and with her sister Mary Burrus Williams, she wrote historical romance under the name Bronwyn Williams. She was a recipient of the RITA Award.

== Biography ==
Dixie Burrus was born in 1930 on North Carolina's Outer Banks, daughter of professional baseball player Maurice Lennon "Dick" Burrus. She learned from a young age to enjoy the water and the outdoors, and to spend plenty of time lying down with a good book. Browning considered herself foremost an artist. She studied and later taught art. She painted landscapes and seascapes in watercolor, and was listed in Who's Who in American Art.

In 1975, Browning began writing a newspaper column on art. Shortly thereafter, she decided to try fiction. As she had recently begun reading romance novels, she attempted to recreate the pieces of the genre that appealed to her. This tactic worked, as in 1976, Avalon published her first two romances. She then published over 100 category romance novels. At the end of 2004, after Browning had submitted yet another manuscript, she realized that writing was not as exciting for her as it had been. She began painting again, and after that concentrated primarily on her art.

Browning co-founded and served as the first president of The Watercolor Society of North Carolina. She was also a co-owner of Browning Artworks in Frisco, North Carolina, which featured her own work as well as that of her son and daughter-in-law.

Browning lived in North Carolina with her husband, Leonard "Lee" Browning, until his death in 2011. Browning died on June 11, 2024, at the age of 93.

== Awards ==
=== As Dixie Browning ===
- Renegade Player: 1983 Rita Awards Best Novel winner

== Bibliography ==
=== As Zoe Dozier ===
==== Single novels ====
- Home Again, My Love Avalon 1977
- Warm Side of the Island Avalon 1977

=== As Dixie Browning ===
==== Stand-alone novels ====
- Unreasonable Summer Silhouette Romance 5/80
- Tumbled Wall Silhouette Romance 10/80
- Chance Tomorrow Silhouette Romance 1/81
- Wren of Paradise Silhouette Romance 4/81
- East of Today Silhouette Romance 7/81
- Winter Blossom Silhouette Romance 11/81
- Renegade Player Silhouette Romance 4/82
- Island on the Hill Silhouette Romance 7/82
- Logic of the Heart Silhouette Romance 9/82
- Finders Keepers Silhouette Special Ed. 10/82
- Loving Rescue Silhouette Romance 12/82
- A Secret Valentine Silhouette Romance 2/83
- Practical Dreamer Silhouette Special Ed. 5/83
- Shadow of Yesterday Silhouette Desire 6/83
- Reach Out to Cherish Silhouette Special Ed. 8/83
- Image of Love Silhouette Desire 10/83
- The Hawk and the Honey Silhouette Desire 1/84
- Visible Heart Silhouette Romance 2/84
- Late Rising Moon Silhouette Desire 3/84
- Journey to Quiet Waters Silhouette Romance 5/84
- The Love Thing Silhouette Romance 7/84
- Just Desserts Silhouette Special Ed. 8/84
- First Things Last Silhouette Romance 10/84
- Stormwatch Silhouette Desire 11/84
- Time and Tide Silhouette Special Ed. 12/84
- The Tender Barbarian Silhouette Desire 2/85
- By Any Other Name Silhouette Special Ed. 3/85
- Matchmaker's Moon Silhouette Desire 6/85
- Something For Herself Silhouette Romance 8/85
- A Bird in Hand Silhouette Desire 9/85
- In the Palm of Her Hand Silhouette Desire 2/86
- The Security Man Silhouette Special Ed. 6/86
- Reluctant Dreamer Silhouette Romance 10/86
- A Winter Woman Silhouette Desire 12/86
- There Once Was a Lover Silhouette Desire 3/87
- A Matter of Timing Silhouette Romance 9/87
- Belonging Silhouette Special Ed. 10/87
- Henry the Ninth Silhouette Xmas novella 11/87
- Fate Takes a Holiday Silhouette Desire 4/88
- Along Came Jones Silhouette Desire 6/88
- Thin Ice Silhouette Desire 1/89
- Beginners Luck Silhouette Desire 9/89
- Ships in the Night Silhouette Desire 1/90
- Twice in a Blue Moon Silhouette Desire 8/90
- The Homing Instinct Silhouette Romance 9/90
- Just Say Yes Silhouette Desire 9/91
- Not a Marrying Man Silhouette Desire 11/91
- Gus and the Nice Lady Silhouette Desire 2/92
- The Best Man for the Job Silhouette Desire 6/92
- Hazards of the Heart Silhouette Desire 4/93
- Kane's Way Silhouette Desire 8/93
- Grace and the Law Silhouette Novella 4/94
- Bedeviled (w/a Bronwyn Williams) Topaz 3/95
- Single Female (reluctantly) Seeks Silhouette 11/95
- Look What the Stork Brought Silhouette Desire 12/97
- Entwined (w/a Bronwyn Williams) Topaz 8/98
- The Texas Millionaire Silhouette Desire 8/99
- The Bride-in-Law Silhouette Desire 11/99
- Cinderella's Midnight Kiss Silhouette 6/00
- Long Shadow's Woman Harlequin Super 3/01
- More to Love Silhouette Desire 6/01
- Rocky and the Senator's Daughter Silhouette Desire 11/01
- The Marrying Millionaire (Going to the Chapel) Silhouette Anthology 07/02
- Undertow Silhouette Single Title 07/03
- Blackstone's Bride Harlequin Historical 08/03
- Christmas Eve Reunion (Lone Star Country Club) Silhouette Anthology 11/03
- Social Graces Silhouette Desire 12/03
- Driven to Distraction Silhouette Desire 03/04
- Her Passionate Plan B Silhouette Desire 01/05
- Her Man Upstairs Silhouette Desire 02/05
- Her Fifth Husband? Silhouette Desire 03/04

==== Outer Banks series ====
1. Keegan's Hunt Silhouette Desire 11/93
2. Lucy and the Stone Silhouette Desire 5/94
3. Two Hearts, Slight Used Silhouette Desire 11/94

==== Tall, Dark and Handsome series ====
1. Alex and the Angel Silhouette Desire 9/95
2. The Beast, The Beauty, The Baby Silhouette Desire 3/96
3. Stryker's Wife Silhouette Desire 11/96

==== Lawless Heirs series ====
1. The Passionate G-Man Silhouette Desire 5/98
2. His Business, Her Baby Silhouette 11/98
3. A Knight in Rusty Armor Silhouette Desire 2/99

==== Passionate Powers series ====
1. A Bride for Jackson Powers Silhouette Desire 2/00
2. The Virgin and the Vengeful Groom Silhouette Desire 11/00

==== Beckett's Fortune series ====
1. Beckett's Cinderella (Book 1 - Beckett's Fortune) Silhouette Desire 08/02
2. Beckett's Birthright (Book 2 - Beckett's Fortune) Harlequin Historical 11/02 (As Bronwyn Williams)
3. Beckett's Convenient Bride (Book 3 - Beckett's Fortune) Silhouette Desire 01/03

==== Daddy Knows Last series (multi-author) ====
- The Baby Notion Silhouette Desire 7/96

==== Texas Cattleman's Club: The Last Bachelor series (multi-author) ====
- The Millionaire's Pregnant Bride Silhouette Desire 02/02

==== Lone Star Country Club series (multi-author) ====
- The Quiet Seduction (Lone Star Country Club) Silhouette Books 11/02

==== Collections ====
- Bad Boys: the Tender Barbarian / Golden Man / The Gentling (1993)
- Lawless Lovers: The Passionate G-Man / His Business, Her Baby (2005)
- Her Passionate Plan B / Her Man Upstairs (2006)

==== Omnibus in collaboration ====
- Silhouette Christmas Stories: 1987: Bluebird Winter / Henry the Ninth / Season of Miracles / Humbug Man (1987) (with Ginna Gray, Linda Howard and Diana Palmer)
- Wild Lady / Circumstantial Evidence / Island on the Hill (1990) (with Annette Broadrick and Ann Major)
- Visible Heart / Handyman Special / Wanderer's Dream (1992) (with Pamela Browning and Rita Clay)
- Spring Fancy (1994) (with Pepper Adams and Cait London)
- Spring Fever (1997) (with Pepper Adams and Cait London)
- A Daddy Again (1998) (with Dorothy Glenn and Joan Hohl)
- Made for Love (2002) (with Ann Major)
- Going to the Chapel (2002) (with Stella Bagwell and Sharon Sala)
- Tender Love Stories: Compliments of the Groom / Who's Holding the Baby?/ One-night Wife / A Secret Valentine/ East of Today (2002) (with Day Leclaire and Kasey Michaels)
- Her Personal Protector (2002) (with Sheri Whitefeather)
- A Man of Means / The Millionaire's Pregnant Bride (2003) (with Diana Palmer)
- Home for the Holidays (2003) (with Leanne Banks and Kathie DeNosky)
- A Cowboy and a Gentleman / Beckett's Children (2003) (with Ann Major)
- Beckett's Convenient Bride / The Sheikh's Bidding (2004) (with Kristi Gold)
- Social Graces / Having the Tycoon's Baby (2004) (with Anna DePalo)
- Driven to Distraction / Like a Hurricane (2004) (with Roxanne St. Claire)
- Beauty and the Baby / Social Graces (2004) (with Marie Ferrarella)
- Driven to Distraction / Cherokee Stranger (2004) (with Sheri Whitefeather)
- Baby Notion / Like Lightning (2005) (with Charlene Sands)
- Beckett's Convenient Bride / New Year's Baby / Danger Becomes You (2005) (with Annette Broadrick and Kathie DeNosky)
- Her Fifth Husband? / Last Reilly Standing (2006) (with Maureen Child)
- The Virgin's Awakening (2006) (with Sally Tyler Hayes)
- Christmas Stories (1989) (with Ginna Gray, Linda Howard and Diana Palmer)

=== As Bronwyn Williams ===
==== Single novels ====
- White Witch Harlequin Historical 8/88
- Dandelion Harlequin Historical 3/89
- Stormwalker Harlequin Historical 6/90
- Gideon's Fall Harlequin Historical 3/91
- The Mariner's Bride Harlequin Historical 11/91
- A Promise Kept Harlequin Historical Christmas novella 10/93
- The Warfield Bride Topaz 9/94
- Slow Surrender Topaz 12/95
- Halfway Home Topaz 8/96
- Sunshine Topaz Novella 5/97
- Seaspell Topaz 8/97
- Beholden Topaz 9/98
- The Paper Marriage Harlequin Historical 8/00
- Good as Gold Harlequin Historical 8/01
- The Mail-Order Brides Harlequin Historical 12/01

==== Omnibus in collaboration ====
- Harlequin Historical Christmas Stories: 1992 (1992) (with Maura Seger and Erin Yorke)
- Heart of the Home (1997) (with Denise Domning, Brenda Joyce and Fern Michaels)
- Big Sky Grooms: Spirit of the Wolf / As Good As Gold / The Gamble (2001) (with Carolyn Davidson and Susan Mallery)
- Gamble / As Good as Gold / Spirit of the Wolf (2004) (with Carolyn Davidson and Susan Mallery)
- Montana Legends (2005) (with Carolyn Davidson and Susan Mallery)

== Works as illustrator ==
- North Carolina Parade
- Drawing and Painting the Natural Environment by Barclay Sheaks (contributor)

== Awards and reception ==
- 1983 - Romance Writers of America RITA Award, Contemporary Sweet Romance – Renegade Player

She was a five-time RITA finalist. She also won three Maggies, and numerous awards from the National Federation of Press Women and the NC Press Club.
