= International Association of Torch Clubs =

- Abbreviation: IATC
- Formation: 1924; 102 years ago
- Headquarters: Chesapeake, Virginia, United States
- Location(s): United States and Canada
- President: Susan Breen-Held, Des Moines, Iowa (2022-2024)
- Vice President: Art Bloom, Winston-Salem, North Carolina (2022-2024)
- Key people: William Bullock (Founder)
- Main organ: The Torch
- Website: torch.org

International Association of Torch Clubs is an association of about 70 local clubs in the United States and Canada dedicated to broadening the intellectual and social horizons of professionals. The aim of these groups is to promote cultural and educational discussions, generally based on presentations by members following a dinner or social gathering. Topics of presentations might include history, culture, government, politics, and science, with controversial subjects welcomed. Unlike many membership organizations, Torch Club does not have community service as a goal. The objective of the international club is to give to the members of different professions the opportunity to meet together in a spirit of fellowship to prevent the narrowing tendencies of specialties by developing a breadth of thought.

== History ==
The International Association of Torch Clubs, Inc., or IATC, was founded in 1924 by William Bullock in Minneapolis, Minnesota. Bullock had the vision of forming an association of clubs across the country with a purpose of broadening intellectual and social horizons. "The objective," he said, "is to be cultural and educational, to get light and understanding on all vital subjects." He pulled together a group of 75 professionals in Minneapolis to discuss the creation of a new professional association. On July 10, 1924, this group formed the first Torch Club. Bullock then set out across the Midwest to promote this new association. Between 1924 and 1933, with the assistance of D.B. Zimmer, they established a total of fifty-one clubs, many of which remain active to this day. Today, nearly seventy Torch clubs across the United States and Canada meet regularly to hear and discuss cross-profession presentations.

Regional directors across the nation work with clubs within their districts to promote membership development, provide assistance from the International office, and set regional meetings where there can be exchanges of ideas and programs between local clubs within the region. An annual Torch convention brings members from many clubs together for meetings, paper presentations, tours and the annual awards night when the Paxton Prize winning paper is delivered.

Every Torch club welcomes people with intellectual curiosity, who enjoy discussion, and are willing to hear new ideas with an open mind. Torch presentations are typically 30–40 minutes in length. They are carefully researched and can be written as papers, which then are submitted for publication in the quarterly magazine, The Torch. The Torch is mailed in print form to all Torch members, and can be read on-line (thetorchmagazine.org).

== Paxton award ==
The Paxton Award is given yearly to the author of an outstanding paper presented by a Torch member at a Torch meeting. The award was created in honor and memory of W. Norris Paxton, past president of the International Association of Torch Clubs and editor emeritus of the Torch magazine. The winning author receives a trophy, an honorarium, and paid registration to the IATC convention. The winner is introduced at the convention banquet where he or she (or a designated representative) delivers the paper.
