= Laura Parker =

American artist (born 1947)

Laura Parker (born Denver, Colorado, 1947) is an American conceptual, installation, and social practice artist. She is best known for her participatory installations and large scale drawings that address themes of food, agriculture, and soil, which have played a role in the back-to-the-land movement, food-to-table movement, and Locavore movement in California. Her participatory art installations and philosophy on soil, terroir, and locality have influenced Michelan star restaurants, wineries, and celebrity cookbooks, including Insalata’s Restaurant in San Anselmo and Robert Mondavi Winery and chef Robert Reynolds.

Parker's drawings are featured on the walls of the San Anselmo restaurant Insalata's, and in the pages of Heidi Krahling's book Insalata's Mediterranean Table.

She has exhibited at and participated in artist residencies at the de Young Museum in San Francisco, the University of California’s Earthlab in Santa Cruz, the Sonoma County Museum in Santa Rosa, and the Garage Biennial, San Francisco. Her projects have been featured in The New York Times Magazine, Gastronomica, and the University of Chicago Press, and in PBS’ “American Heartland” and American Public Radio’s “The Dinner Party Download.” She lives and works in San Francisco and Sonoma County, California.

== Early life, career, and education ==
Parker spent her childhood summers in the 1950s on her family’s farms in Iowa. The book Field to Palette records Parker's experiences of the Iowa landscape with her grandfather, who reportedly sampled soil and dust from the farm by taste. This memory became Parker’s multi-part series Taste of Place.

Parker spent 40 years directing her own graphic design studio, while also working as an artist. She attended the University of California, Berkeley, the San Francisco Art Institute, the Academy of Art, San Francisco; and the Colorado Institute of Art, Denver.

== Exhibitions ==
Parker has shown her artwork in both solo and group exhibitions, with the majority of them in California. Other locations where she has exhibited her art include Oregon, France, and Germany.

== Themes and media ==
Parker’s participatory installations encouraged people to think about the land and where their food comes from. They preceded the Farm-to-Table Movement and reinvigorated the national public debates originated by Alice Waters, Ralph Nader, and Cesar Chavez’s Farm Workers Movement.

Parker investigates the "role of the farmer as artist" and the plants they grow as art objects. Her project LandScape: The Farmer as Artist is a great example of this exploration.

Large scale pastels and drawings are the underpinnings of all of Parker’s work. She also creates two-dimensional works in graphite, ink, acrylic, and watercolor on paper and canvas. Her three-dimensional work includes mixed-media and multimedia installations, incorporating elements from the natural environment such as dirt, plants, and grapevines. Her installations often include an audience participation component.

== Taste of Place ==
Taste of Place (2006–present) is an interactive installation piece that aims to create an awareness of a particular place based on its taste, similar to the idea of “terroir” in viticulture. These references are explored through direct experience of the soil and the food grown in it, conversation, memory and context.

Participants smell soils in wine glasses and then taste food from the corresponding farms. These events are designed to "connect the smell of the earth to the flavour of foods grown in it".

This work was in part inspired by Parker’s work with Robert Reynolds. Around 1992, the two went to France together and met the farmer and cheesemaker Louis Marie Barrault. Barrault followed the philosophy that what his goats ate would impact the taste of their milk and the taste of his cheeses.

Taste of Place was first installed and performed at the Sonoma County Museum of Art in 2006. In 2010, Parker collaborated with the Robert Mondavi Winery to present her Taste of Place installation at the restaurant Saison in San Francisco's Mission District as well as in Los Angeles and New York. Since then, the work has grown to include tastings of soil from 86 different farms. The goal of the project is to sample at least 100 farms. The invitations for the event included a box of soil from Mondavi's Kalon Vineyard.
