= Beverly Barton =

American writer of romantic suspense novels

- Born: December 23, 1946; Tuscumbia, Alabama, U.S.
- Died: April 21, 2011 (aged 64); Tuscumbia, Alabama, U.S.
- Occupation: Novelist
- Spouse: Billy Ray Beaver
- Writing career
- Period: 1990–2011
- Genres: Romance, Suspense
- Website: www.beverlybarton.com

Beverly Marie Beaver (née Inman; December 23, 1946 – April 21, 2011), better known as Beverly Barton, was an American author, known for her romantic suspense novels. She wrote over thirty contemporary romance novels and created the popular The Protectors series for Harlequin Enterprises–owned Silhouette's Intimate Moments lines. Her first book, Yankee Lover, was published in July 1990 by Harlequin's imprint, Silhouette Desire.

== Biography ==
Beverly Barton was born in Alabama. She spent her formative years between Tuscumbia and Barton, Alabama and Chattanooga, Tennessee. After graduating from Chattanooga Central High School, she attended college at the University of North Alabama.

Barton was a wife, mother, and grandmother.

She died suddenly of heart failure on April 21, 2011.

== Bibliography ==
=== Novels ===
==== Kensington Books ====
1. After Dark (December 2000)
2. The Last to Die (January 2004)
3. As Good As Dead (September 2004)
4. Killing Her Softly Also titled Amnesia (July 2005)
5. Every Move She Makes (June 2006)
6. Close Enough to Kill (July 2006)
7. What She Doesn't Know (September 2006)
8. The Dying Game (April 2007)
9. The Fifth Victim (January 2008)
10. The Murder Game (February 2003)
11. Cold Hearted (September 2008)
12. Silent Killer (September 2009)
13. Worth Dying For (December 2009)
14. The Dying Game (January 2010)
15. Dead by Midnight (February 2010)
16. Don't Cry (August 2010)
17. Dead by Morning (May 2011)
18. Dead by Nightfall (December 2011)
19. Don't Say a Word (August 2012)

=== Anthologies ===
- “Sugar and Spice,” with Fern Michaels, Joanne Fluke, and Shirley Jump (November 2006)
- “Most Likely to Die,” with Lisa Jackson, Beverly Barton and Wendy Corsi Staub (February 2007)
- “Love Is Murder,” with Sherrilyn Kenyon, Heather Graham and Lee Child (May 29, 2012)
