= Romantic Times =

American genre magazine

- Categories: Romance, literary criticism
- Founder: Kathryn Falk
- First issue: 1981
- Final issue: 2018
- Country: United States
- Based in: Brooklyn, New York
- Language: English
- Website: rtbookreviews.com
- ISSN: 1557-3397

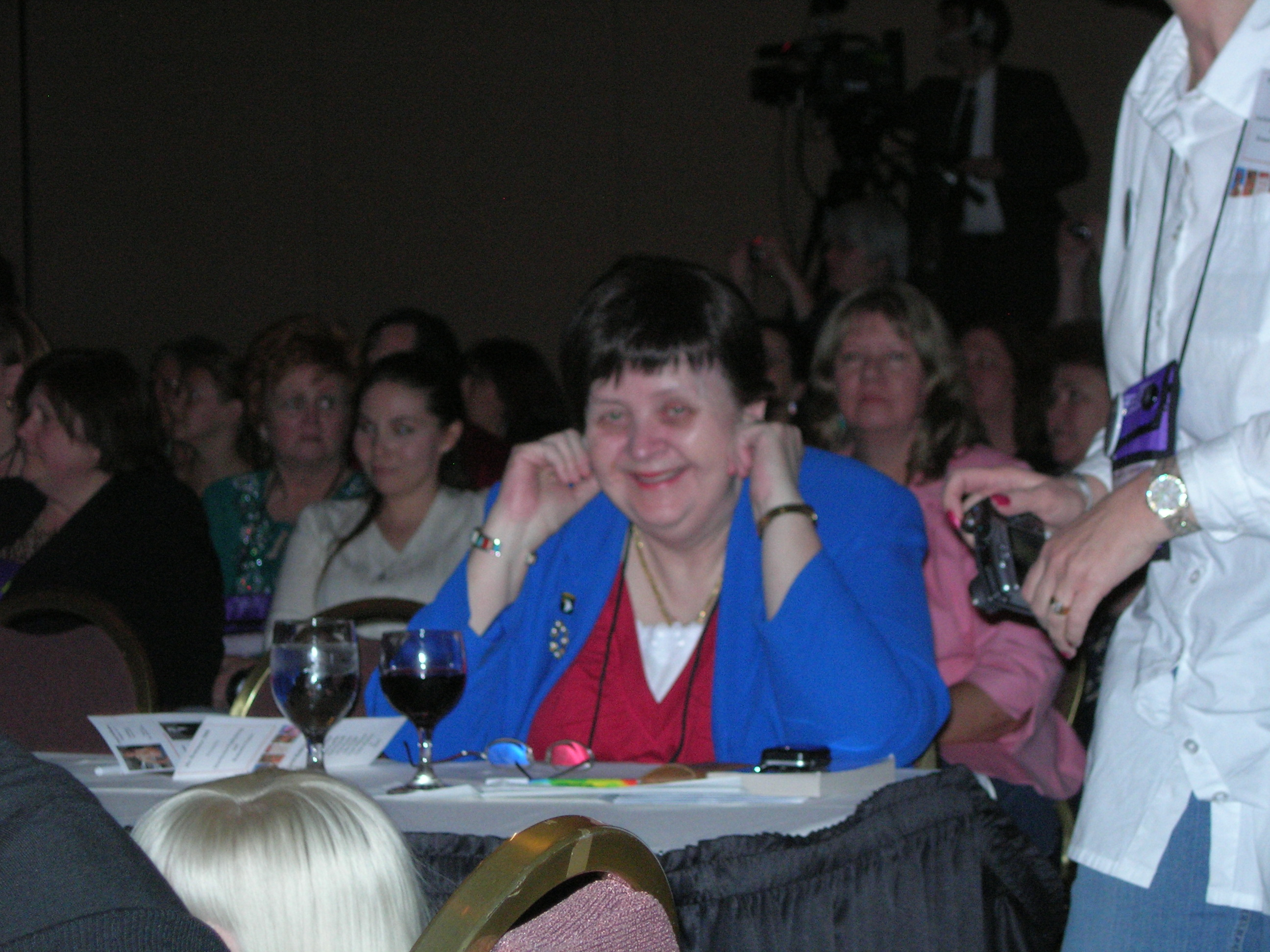
Bertrice Small at the 2008 Romantic Times Booklover's Convention, Pittsburgh, Pennsylvania

Romantic Times was an American genre magazine specializing in romance novels. It was founded as a newsletter in 1981 by Kathryn Falk. The initial publication took nine months to create and was distributed to 3,000 subscribers. In 2004, the magazine reportedly had 150,000 subscribers, and had built a reputation as "Romance's premiere genre magazine".

From 1982 to 2018, the magazine organized the Romantic Times Booklover's Convention. Several thousand people attended the annual gathering, which featured author signings, a costume ball, and a male beauty pageant.

In May 2018, Kathryn Falk and co-owner and husband Kenneth Rubin announced the closure of the magazine.

The last RT Booklover's Convention was the one held May 15–20, 2018 in Reno, Nevada. Falk stated, "After 38 years, I am retiring and ending my participation in publishing..."
