= Susan Mallery =

American author

- Born: 1970 (age 55–56); Los Angeles, California, U.S.
- Education: Seton Hill University (MA)
- Occupation: Author
- Writing career
- Language: English
- Period: 1992–present
- Genres: Contemporary romance, Women's fiction
- Website: www.susanmallery.com

Susan Mallery (born 1970) is an American author of popular romance novels set in non-urban, close-knit communities. Because of her love for animals, pets play a significant role in her books.

== Biography ==
Born in 1970, Susan grew up in the Los Angeles, California, area.

Mallery earned an MA from Seton Hill University.

Mallery was published straight out of college with two books in January 1992.

In 2008, her book Accidentally Yours became the first to make The New York Times Best Seller list.

On July 12, 2012, her book Summer Nights reached No. 2 on The New York Times Best Seller list for paperback mass-market fiction. A second book, A Christmas Bride, was No. 24 in November 2012. A Fool's Gold Christmas made the Times' e-book fiction list on October 14, 2012. Three Sisters reached at No. 3 on the New York Times bestseller list.

Mallery's book Thrill Me reached No. 1 on The New York Times Best Seller list the next year in 2015.

Mallery then began to foray into women's fiction, which she saw as an opportunity to explore some of the other relationships that are so important to women. Today, Mallery describes her work as "Romance-Plus" blending elements of both Contemporary romance and Women's fiction in her stories.

She lives in Washington state with her husband, two cats and a poodle. She is passionate about animal welfare and has served on the board of Seattle Humane.

== Selected works ==
Year	Title	Publisher	ISBN	Note
2001	Sweet Success	Pocket	978-0743405959	Reviewed at Publishers Weekly
2001	Married for a Month	Pocket	978-0743405966	Reviewed at Publishers Weekly
2003	Sparkling One, The	Pocket	978-1416535621	Reviewed at Romantic Times
2003	Sassy One, The	Pocket	978-0743443951	Reviewed at Romantic Times
2003	Seductive One, The	Pocket	978-1416535607	Reviewed at Romantic Times
2004	Someone Like You	HQN Books	978-0373801930	Reviewed at Romantic Times
2005	Falling for Gracie	HQN Books	978-0373801954	Nominated for the 2005 RT Award for Contemporary Romance by Romantic Times
2006	Delicious	HQN Books	978-1459247673	Chosen as a "Fresh Pick" by Fresh Fiction
2006	Marcelli Bride, The	Pocket	978-0743499576	Reviewed by Fresh Fiction
2006	Irresistible	HQN Books	978-0373779376	Reviewed at Publishers Weekly
2007	Marcelli Princess, The	Pocket	978-0743499583	Reviewed at Publishers Weekly, Reviewed by Fresh Fiction
2008	Accidentally Yours	HQN Books	978-0373775279	Reviewed by Fresh Fiction
2008	Sweet Talk	HQN Books	978-0373775323	Featured at BookPage as a "Start Something New" Pick, Reviewed by Fresh Fiction
2008	Sweet Spot	HQN Books	978-0373775316	Reviewed at Romantic Times
2008	Sweet Trouble	HQN Books	978-0373773053	Reviewed at Publishers Weekly
2009	Sunset Bay	Pocket	978-1416567172	Reviewed by Fresh Fiction
2009	Under Her Skin	HQN Books	978-1459247802	Reviewed at Publishers Weekly, Chosen as a "Fresh Pick" by Fresh Fiction
2009	Lip Service	HQN Books	978-0373773725	Reviewed by Fresh Fiction
2009	Straight from the Hip	HQN Books	978-1459247741	Awarded "Top 10 Romance Fiction: 2009" by Booklist
2009	Hot on Her Heels	HQN Books	978-1459247703	Debuted at No. 5 on The New York Times Best Seller list for Paperback Mass-Market Fiction, Reviewed at Publishers Weekly, Reviewed at Booklist
2010	Chasing Perfect	HQN Books	978-0373774524	Reviewed at Publishers Weekly
2010	Almost Perfect	HQN Books	978-0373774906	Listed as a "Fresh Fiction 2010 Favorite Read"
2010	Finding Perfect	HQN Books	978-0373774685	
2010	Best of Friends, The	Pocket Star Books	978-0778313243	
2011	Already Home	Mira Books	978-0778313243	
2011	Only Mine	HQN Books	978-0373775880	Reviewed at Publishers Weekly, Named a "Top Romance of 2011" at Booklist
2011	Only Yours	HQN Books	978-0373775941	Debuted at No. 12 on The New York Times Best Seller list for Combined Print & E-Book Fiction, Reviewed by Library Journal, Reviewed by Fresh Fiction
2011	Only His	HQN Books	978-0373776016	Debuted at No. 8 on The New York Times Best Seller list for Combined Print & E-Book Fiction
2012	Barefoot Season	Mira Books	978-0778318132	Reviewed at Publishers Weekly
2012	Summer Days	HQN Books	978-0373776832	Debuted at No. 13 on The New York Times Best Seller list for Combined Print & E-Book Fiction, Reviewed at Publishers Weekly
2012	Summer Nights	HQN Books	978-0373776870	Debuted at No. 11 on The New York Times Best Seller list for Combined Print & E-Book Fiction, Reviewed at Publishers Weekly
2012	All Summer Long	HQN Books	978-0373776948	Debuted at No. 8 on The New York Times Best Seller list for Combined Print & E-Book Fiction
2012	Fool's Gold Christmas, A	HQN Books	978-0373777884	Reviewed at Kirkus Reviews, Debuted at No. 13 on The New York Times Best Seller list for Combined Print & E-Book Fiction
2013	Three Sisters	Mira Books	978-0778318149	Debuted at No. 6 on The New York Times Best Seller list for Combined Print & E-Book Fiction, Reached No. 3 on The New York Times Best Seller list for E-Book Fiction
2013	Just One Kiss	HQN Books	978-0373777600	Chosen as the June 2013 Top Pick in Romance at BookPage, Reviewed at Kirkus Reviews, Chosen as a "Fresh Pick" by Fresh Fiction
2013	Two of a Kind	HQN Books	978-0373777686	Debuted at No. 9 on The New York Times Best Seller list for Combined Print & E-Book Fiction, Chosen as a "Fresh Pick" by Fresh Fiction
2013	Three Little Words	HQN Books	978-0373777785	Chosen as an iTunes "iBooks Best of 2013 pick", Debuted at No. 4 on The New York Times Best Seller list for Combined Print & E-Book Fiction
2013	Fool's Gold Cookbook	HQN Books	978-0373892815	Reviewed at Publishers Weekly
2013	Christmas on 4th Street	HQN Books	978-0373778997	Debuted at No. 12 on The New York Times Best Seller list for Combined Print & E-Book Fiction, Reviewed at Publishers Weekly, Chosen as a "'Tis the Season for Love" pick at BookPage, Reviewed at Library Journal
2014	Evening Stars	Mira Books	978-0778318989	Debuted at No. 13 on The New York Times Best Seller list for Paperback Trade Fiction
2014	When We Met	HQN Books	978-0373778652	Debuted at No. 6 on The New York Times Best Seller list for Combined Print & E-Book Fiction, Reviewed at Publishers Weekly Reviewed at Kirkus Reviews,
2014	Before We Kiss	HQN Books	978-0373778812	Debuted at No. 8 on The New York Times Best Seller list for Combined Print & E-Book Fiction, Chosen as a "Fresh Pick" by Fresh Fiction
2014	Until We Touch	HQN Books	978-0373778935	Debuted at No. 6 on The New York Times Best Seller list for Combined Print & E-Book Fiction, Reviewed at Library Journal, Chosen as a "Fresh Pick" by Fresh Fiction
2015	Girls of Mischief Bay, The	Mira Books	978-0778319757	Reviewed at Kirkus Reviews, Featured in March 2015 print issue of BookPage
2015	Hold Me	HQN Books	978-0373779970	Debuted at No. 6 on The New York Times Best Seller list for Combined Print & E-Book Fiction, Reviewed at Publishers Weekly
2015	Kiss Me	HQN Books	978-0373780129	Debuted at No. 11 on The New York Times Best Seller list for Combined Print & E-Book Fiction and No. 2 for Paperback Mass-Market Fiction, LibraryReads.org selection for "Top Ten Books Published this Month that Librarians Across the Country Love", Reviewed at Library Journal
2015	Thrill Me	HQN Books	978-0373788989	Debuted at No. 1 on The New York Times Best Seller list for Paperback Mass-Market Fiction and No. 4 for Combined Print & E-Book Fiction
2015	Marry Me at Christmas	HQN Books	978-0373789351	Adapted to a 2017 television film by The Hallmark Channel, starring Trevor Donovan and Rachel Skarsten.
2016	Friends We Keep, The	HQN Books	978-0778318729	Reviewed at Kirkus Reviews, Reviewed at Publishers Weekly, Reviewed at BookPage
2016	Best of My Love	HQN Books	978-0373789191	Starred review at Library Journal, a LibraryReads List Pick for April 2016, Reviewed at Publishers Weekly, Debuted at No. 4 on The New York Times Best Seller list for Paperback Mass-Market Fiction and No. 6 for Combined Print & E-Book Fiction
2016	Daughters of the Bride	HQN Books	978-0373799466	Reviewed at Publishers Weekly & Kirkus Reviews, Library Journal selection for "Best Books 2016: Romance"
2017	Million Little Things, A	Mira Books	978-0778326939	Debuted at No. 8 on The New York Times Best Seller list for Combined Print & E-Book Fiction, Reviewed at Publishers Weekly, Chosen for the "Most Anticipated Romance of 2017" list by BookPage
2017	Secrets of the Tulip Sisters	HQN Books	978-0373802760	Reviewed at Kirkus Reviews
2017	You Say It First	HQN Books	978-0373799336	Debuted at No. 6 on The New York Times Best Seller list for Combined Print & E-Book Fiction, Reviewed at Kirkus Reviews, Reviewed at Publishers Weekly, Reviewed at Library Journal, Reviewed at Booklist
2017	Second Chance Girl	HQN Books	978-0373799350	Debuted at No. 6 on The New York Times Best Seller list for Combined Print & E-Book Fiction, Listed as a Library Journal "Romance Best Seller for January 2018", Reviewed at Kirkus Reviews, Reviewed at Publishers Weekly
2018	Sisters Like Us	HQN Books	978-0778330905	Debuted at No. 13 on The New York Times Best Seller list for Combined Print & E-Book Fiction, Reviewed at Kirkus Reviews
2018	When We Found Home	HQN Books	978-0373802500	Reviewed at Publishers Weekly
2018	Why Not Tonight	HQN Books	978-1335474605	Debuted at No. 6 on The New York Times Best Seller list for Combined Print & E-Book Fiction, Reviewed at Kirkus Reviews, Reviewed at Publishers Weekly, Reviewed at BookPage, Featured in Library Journal's Book Pulse
2018	Not Quite Over You	HQN Books	978-1335474636	Debuted at No. 4 on The New York Times Best Seller list for Combined Print & E-Book Fiction, Reviewed at Publishers Weekly, Featured in Library Journal's Book Pulse
2019	California Girls	Mira Books	978-0778351252	Reviewed at Publishers Weekly, Featured in Library Journal's Book Pulse
2019	Summer of Sunshine and Margot, The	HQN Books	978-1335659972	Reviewed at Publishers Weekly, No. 15 on The New York Times Best Seller list for Combined Print & E-Book Fiction
2019	Meant to Be Yours	HQN Books	978-1335041494	Debuted at No. 12 on The New York Times Best Seller list for Combined Print & E-Book Fiction, Featured in Library Journal's Book Pulse
2020	Sisters by Choice	Mira Books	978-0778309390	Reviewed at Publishers Weekly, Featured in Library Journal's Book Pulse
2020	Friendship List, The	HQN Books	978-1335136961	Reviewed at Publishers Weekly
2020	Happily This Christmas	HQN Books	978-1335081285	Featured in Library Journal's Book Pulse, Reviewed by Fresh Fiction
2021	Vineyard at Painted Moon, The	HQN Books	978-1335912794	Voted "Top Ten Reads Loved by Libraries," LibraryReads.org
2021	Stepsisters, The	Mira Books	978-0778331803	
