= Robin Elliot =

Robin Elliot may refer to:

- Robin Elliot, character in Sons and Daughters (Australian TV series)
- Robin Elliot, on Young Star Search
- Robin Eliot, English cricketer and racing horse owner

== See also ==
- Robin Elliott, pen name of Joan Elliott Pickart
