= Barbara McCauley =

American romance writer

- Born: Southern California, U.S.
- Occupation: Novelist
- Writing career
- Period: 1991–present
- Genre: Romance
- Notable work: Miss Pruitt's Private Life
- Notable awards: RITA award – Short Contemporary Romance; 2005 Miss Pruitt's Private Life

Barbara McCauley is an American romance writer. She has written over 35 romance novels for Harlequin Enterprises since 1991 and is a winner of a Romance Writers of America's RITA Award.

== Biography ==
McCauley was born in Southern California. The youngest of five children, she loved reading and writing from an early age. She is married and has two children.

McCauley published her first book in 1991, Woman Tamer. She is a past co-president of the Orange County chapter of Romance Writers of America. McCauley is a USA TODAY bestselling author and has made frequent appearances on the Waldenbooks Bestseller list.

== Bibliography ==
=== Single Novels ===
- Woman Tamer (1991)
- Man from Cougar Pass (1992)
- Whitehorn's Woman (1993)
- Her Kind of Man (1993)
- A Man Like Cade (1993)
- Nightfire (1994)
- Midnight Bride (1996)
- The Nanny and the Reluctant Rancher (1997)
- Courtship in Granite Ridge (1998)
- Small Mercies (1998)

=== Texas's Hearts Of Stone Series ===
1. Texas Heat (1995)
2. Texas Temptation (1995)
3. Texas Pride (1995)

=== Conveniently Wed Series Multi-Author ===
- Seduction of the Reluctant Bride (1998)

=== Secrets By Blackhawk-Sinclair Saga Series ===
1. Blackhawk's Sweet Revenge (1999)
2. Secret Baby Santos (1999)
3. Killian's Passion (1999)
4. Callan's Proposition (2000)
5. Gabriel's Honor (2000)
6. Reese's Wild Wager (2001)
7. Sinclair's Surprise Baby (2001)
8. Taming Blackhawk (2002)
9. In Blackhawk's Bed (2002)
10. That Blackhawk Bride (2003)
11. Miss Pruitt's Private Life (2004)
12. Blackhawk Legacy (2004)
13. Blackhawk's Betrayal (2006)
14. Blackhawk's Bond (2006)
15. Blackhawk's Affair (2007)

=== Fortunes of Texas Series Multi-Author ===
- Fortune's Secret Daughter (2001)

=== Crown and Glory Series Multi-Author ===
- Royally Pregnant (2002)

=== Dynasties the Barones Series Multi-Author ===
- Where There's Smoke (2003)

=== Dynasties the Danforths Series Multi-Author ===
- The Cinderella Scandal (2004)

=== Dynasties the Ashtons Series Multi-Author ===
- Name Your Price (2005)

=== Omnibus In Collaboration ===
- It's Raining Men! (2001) (with Elizabeth Bevarly)
- Surprise Baby (2002) (with Kathie DeNosky)
- Taming Blackhawk / Michael's Temptation (2002) (with Eileen Wilks)
- Summer Gold (2003) (with Elizabeth Lowell)
- Taming the Prince / Royally Pregnant (2003) (with Elizabeth Bevarly)
- Billionaire Bachelors: Garrett / In Blackhawk's Bed (2003) (with Anne Marie Winston)
- The Blackhawk Bride / Billionaire Bachelors: Gray (2004) (with Anne Marie Winston)
- Where There's Smoke... / Beauty and The Blue Angel (2004) (with Maureen Child)
- Dynasties: Summer in Savannah (2004) (with Maureen Child and Sheri Whitefeather)
- The Cinderella Scandal / Man Beneath the Uniform (2004) (with Maureen Child)
- Laying His Claim / Miss Pruitt's Private Life (2005) (with Beverly Barton)
- Passionate Secrets (2006) (with Maggie Shayne)
- Summer Desires (2006) (with Joan Johnston and Wendy Rosnau) (Wolf River Summer / Hawk's Way / Virgin Groom / Long Hot Summer)
- Savour the Seduction / Name Your Price (2006) (with Laura Wright)
- One Hot Summer (2007) (with Joan Johnston and Diana Palmer)
- In His Bed (2007) (with Linda Winstead Jones)

=== Poems ===
- The Darkness That Was There All Along (2004)

== Awards ==
- 2005 - Romance Writers of America RITA Award, Short Contemporary Romance – Miss Pruitt's Private Life
- KISS and Achievement awards from Romantic Times
- award from Affaire de Coeur
- nine other RITA award nominations
