= Alexandra Sellers =

American novelist

- Occupation: Novelist
- Writing career
- Period: 1980–present
- Genre: romance
- Website: alexandrasellers.com

Alexandra Sellers is a Canadian writer and author of 40 contemporary romance novels and a cat language textbook considered by some to be an academic spoof. Her novels have been published in various Harlequin and Silhouette category lines, including Desire, Intrigue, Mills & Boon, Special Releases, Presents, Intimate Moments and Special Edition, as well as by Entangled and Dell. She is best known for her Sons of the Desert sheikh series. She has also been published by Bellew and HarperCollins, and under a pseudonym.

== Biography ==
=== Influences ===
Sellers' favourite authors include Doris Lessing, Jane Austen, Robertson Davies and romance authors such as Jane Donnelly and Mary Burchell. Among books that have strongly influenced her are The Sufis by Idries Shah, The Thousand and One Nights translated by Richard Burton, and Jane Austen's novels. In poetry she admires Icons of Flesh by Glen Sorestad, The Pig Poets: An Anthology of Porcine Poesy by Henry Hogge.

=== Education ===
Born in Canada, Alexandra Sellers was educated there and in the UK. Although first a graduate of the Royal Academy of Dramatic Art in London, she has studied eight foreign languages, including French, German, Latin, Greek, Hebrew, Arabic, Persian, and Italian. After studying languages and linguistics at the University of British Columbia, she attended the School of Oriental and African Studies, or SOAS, University of London, a public research university located in London, United Kingdom that specializes in arts and humanities, languages, laws and social sciences relating to Asia, Africa and the Middle East. Sellers was the first student to study for a double degree in Persian and Religious Studies; she was awarded First Class Honours. She has studied Hebrew and Judaism in Israel; Persian, Shiite Islam and Zoroastrianism in Iran; and Arabic and Sunni Islam in Yemen. She is a Fellow of the Royal Asiatic Society.

=== Writing career ===
Her first full-length novel was published in 1980, and after this Sellers became a full-time writer. Many of her novels are set in exotic locations, some of them fictional countries. Romantic Times has described her novels as "enchanting...superbly integrating a memorable plot, delightful characters, and tender emotion."

It has been said that "There is no better illustration of the changing and evolving sensibilities of the time, in fact, than the three novels Sellers wrote for the Silhouette Intimate Moments line -- The Real Man, The Male Chauvinist, and The Old Flame....What Sellers is really writing about, however, are the socially constructed perceptions of sexuality and gender that serve to make men the enemies of women (and sometimes the reverse), and which often hide our real values, motives, and feelings even from ourselves."

=== Awards ===
In 1997, her novel A Nice Girl Like You was nominated by Romantic Times for a Reviewers' Choice Award for Best Silhouette Yours Truly. Three years later she received the Romantic Times Career Achievement Award for Series Romantic Fantasy, and in 2009 she received the Romantic Times Career Achievement Best Author Award for Series.

=== Linguistics ===
Sellers has studied the language of cats, and published her findings in the book Spoken Cat and Relevant Factors in Worldview. According to her book, "here is your milk" is "birr pirp r'mow" when translated into cat speak. "Here are a few tidbits," meanwhile, becomes "mRRah mRRah pirp r'mow." She also believes that cats have their own body of myths and folklore. She says that the cats have told her that they came from Canopus (the second brightest star after Sirius) to educate humanity on cleanliness. In particular, they believe that we should use our excrement as fertiliser, instead of disposing of it in our drinking water.

Diana White, of The Boston Globe, described the book as "an elaborate, beautifully executed joke that not only pokes fun at the cat-human connection, but at language texts, too....Clearly, Sellers knows cats." The SOAS Magazine stated that "Supporters of the 'pet as human companion' theory will see in the book the answer to their prayers."

=== Personal life ===
Alexandra Sellers lives in Vancouver.

== Bibliography: Fiction ==
=== Single novels ===
- Captive of Desire (1982)
- Fire in the Wind (1982)
- Season of Storm (1983)
- The Forever Kind (1984)
- The Indifferent Heart (1984)
- The Real Man (1984)
- The Male Chauvinist (1985)
- The Old Flame (1986)
- The Best Of Friends (1990)
- The Man Next Door (1991)
- A Gentleman and a Scholar (1993)
- The Vagabond (1994)
- Roughneck (1995)
- Dearest Enemy (1995)
- A Nice Girl Like You (1996)
- Not Without a Wife! (1997)
- Shotgun Wedding (1997)
- Wife on Demand (2000)

=== Sons Of The Desert Series ===
1. Bride of the Sheikh (1997)
2. Sheikh's Ransom (1999)
3. The Solitary Sheikh (1999)
4. Beloved Sheikh (1999)
5. Sheikh's Temptation (2000)
6. Sheikh's Honour (2000)
7. Sheikh's Woman (2001)
8. The Playboy Sheikh (2002)
9. Sheikh's Castaway (2004)
10. The Ice Maiden's Sheikh (2004)
11. The Fierce and Tender Sheikh (2005)
12. Sheikh's Betrayal (2009)

=== Venables Series ===
1. Occupation, Millionaire (1998)
2. Occupation, Casanova (1999)

=== Sons Of The Desert: The Sultans Series ===
1. The Sultan's Heir (2001)
2. Undercover Sultan (2001)
3. Sleeping with the Sultan (2001)

=== Firstborn Sons Series ===
- Born Royal (2001)

=== Johari Crown Series ===
1. Her Royal Protector (2014)
2. The Sheikh's Love Nest (2016)

=== Anthologies ===
- One Hundred Per Cent Male (2001) (with Peggy Moreland)
- Secret Child (2002) (with Maureen Child)
- Sheikhs of Summer (2002) (with Fiona Brand, Susan Mallery)
- Up Close and Passionate (2002) (with Maureen Child)
- Seduced by the Sheikh (2002) (with Gail Dayton)
- The Playboy Sheikh / Billionaire Bachelors: Stone (2002) (with Anne Marie Winston)
- Captured Hearts / The Greek Tycoon's Baby / Sophie's Sheikh / Spring Fling (2003) (with Kylie Brant and Lenora Worth)
- Sheikh's Desire (2003) (with Brittany Young)
- Princes of the Desert (2005) (with Kristi Gold)
- Sheikh's Castaway / The Ice Maiden's Sheikh (Omnibus) (2005)
- Desert Heat (2005) (with Susan Mallery)
- The Sheikh's Captive (2006) (with Susan Mallery)
- Desert Princes (2007) (with Lucy Gordon and Michelle Reid)
- Possessed by the Sheikh (2007) (with Susan Mallery)
- Surrender to the Sheikh (2007) (with Susan Mallery)

== Bibliography: Other ==
Spoken Cat and Relevant Factors in Worldview (1997)

== See also ==
- List of romantic novelists
