= Sleeper =

A sleeper is a person who is sleeping.

Sleeper may also refer to:

== Arts and entertainment ==
=== Characters ===
- Sleeper (Marvel Comics), a Nazi German robot utilized by the Red Skull in Marvel Comics

=== Films ===
- Sleeper (1973 film), a Woody Allen film
- Sleeper (2005 film), an Austrian/German film
- Sleeper (2012 film), an action/thriller film starring Scott "Raven" Levy and Bruce Hopkins
- The Sleeper (2000 film), a British television crime drama film
- The Sleeper (2012 film), an American horror film

=== Television episodes ===
- "Sleeper (Space Ghost Coast to Coast)", an episode of Space Ghost Coast to Coast
- "Sleeper" (Buffy the Vampire Slayer), 2002
- "Sleeper" (Modern Family), 2014
- "Sleeper" (Roseanne), 1994
- "Sleeper" (Smallville), 2008
- "Sleeper" (Torchwood), 2008
- "Sleeper", an episode of The New Avengers

=== Literature ===
- The Sleeper, a novel by Emily Barr
- Sleeper (comics), published by WildStorm/DC Comics
- "The Sleeper" (poem), a poem by Edgar Allan Poe
- The Sleeper Awakes, a book by H.G. Wells

=== Music ===
==== Groups ====
- Sleeper (band), a Britpop band in the 1990s
- Oh, Sleeper, a metalcore band formed in the 2000s

==== Albums ====
- Sleeper (Everyday Sunday album)
- Sleeper (Godstar album), 1993
- Sleeper (Keith Jarrett album), 2012
- Sleeper (Tribe album), 1993
- Sleeper (Ty Segall album), 2013
- The Sleeper, a 2003 Blue Orchids album
- The Sleeper ( album), an album by The Leisure Society

==== Songs ====
- "Sleeper", by 10 Years from Minus the Machine, 2012
- "Sleeper", by Erra from Drift, 2016
- "The Sleeper", by Candiria from Kiss the Lie, 2008

=== Other ===
- "The sleeper", a yo-yo trick

== Biology ==
- Sleepers or sleeper gobies, the common names for fish belonging to the family Eleotridae
- Freshwater sleeper, family of fish
- Sleeper cichlid, perch-like member of the genus Nimbochromis

== Construction ==
- Sleeper, a strong internal beam in construction and shipbuilding
- Sleeper dike, a low inland dike, made obsolete by a newer dike closer to shore

== Fashion ==
- Sleeper, or Babygrow, a one-piece, often footed sleeping garment for babies and toddlers
- Sleeper earring, originally designed to be worn while sleeping to keep the hole in a pierced ear open
- Sleeper (brand), a Ukrainian fashion brand of multifunctional apparel founded in 2014 by Kate Zubarieva and Asya Varetsa

== Transportation ==
- Sleeper (car), an automobile that has been modified to improve its performance without changing its outward appearance; the British term for this is Q-car
- Sleeping car or sleeper, a railway passenger car with beds
- Sleeper bus, designed to carry fewer passengers in greater comfort
- Truck sleeper, a sleeping compartment behind the cab of a tractor unit
- Railway sleeper, a railroad tie
- Sleeper ship, a hypothetical spacecraft in which the crew hibernates

== Other uses ==
- Sleeper agent, a secret agent or similar operative left long inactive
- Sleeper hit, a work that obtains unexpected recognition or success
- Sleeper, a sleeping partner in business
- Sleeper hold, a rear naked choke hold used in professional wrestling
- Sofa bed, also known as a sleeper sofa
- Bedside sleeper, a baby crib that attaches to the parents' bed
- Sleeper, Missouri, an unincorporated community in Laclede County, Missouri, United States

== See also ==
- Sleepers (disambiguation)
- Sleeper (surname)
