= Emilie Richards =

American author

- Born: Bethesda, Maryland, U.S.
- Education: Florida State University; Virginia Tech
- Occupation: Novelist
- Writing career
- Period: 1983–present
- Genre: romance
- Website: www.emilierichards.com

Emilie Richards is an American author of over 50 contemporary romance and mystery novels.

== Early years ==
Emilie Richards was born in Bethesda, Maryland and raised in St. Petersburg, Florida. After receiving an undergraduate degree in American studies from Florida State University, Richards earned a master's degree in family development from Virginia Tech.

She worked as a therapist in a mental health center, before becoming a parent services coordinator for families enrolled in Head Start and then working in several pastoral counseling centers. Richards' husband is a Unitarian Universalist minister.

== Writing career ==
Richards began writing in 1983 after the birth of her fourth child. Her son would sit on her lap as she wrote, and Richards titled her first completed work, Brendan's Song, after him. The book was published in 1985 in the Silhouette Romance category line. She has subsequently written over 40 novels for Silhouette, including six, all set in Australia or New Zealand, written during a four-month sabbatical in Australia.

As a result of years working as a family counselor, her novels "feature complex characterizations and in-depth explorations of social issues." Richards won a Romance Writers of America RITA Award, the highest award given to romance authors, in 1994 for Dragonslayer. Richards has also been nominated three times for Romantic Times Reviewers' Choice Awards and is a recipient of their Career Achievement Award.

Despite the occasional use of overly clichéd lines, Richards' writing "effortlessly flows from page to page." Her characters often sport unusual quirks, such as a penchant for strange sandwich ingredients, which gives the story an added charm.

In 2004, Richards began a new series of single-title novels centered around quilting. These novels were inspired by a volunteer stint with VISTA. While she was an undergraduate, Richards spent a summer living in the Arkansas Ozark Mountains, helping the residents and learning to quilt.

The following year, Richards began writing murder mysteries in addition to romance novels. The novels, in a series called Ministry is Murder, are based partially on her experience as a minister's wife and are written in first-person from the perspective of the heroine, minister's wife "Aggie" Wilcox. Characters in this series are "interesting [and] well-developed," although suspense is "minimal."

== Personal life ==
Richards and her husband, Michael, have three biological sons and a daughter who was adopted from India. They have lived throughout the United States, including in Florida, Louisiana, California, Arkansas, Ohio, and Pennsylvania. As of 2007, they reside in Arlington, Virginia.

She was the first person to be named to the National Advisory Board of ABC Quilts, a non-profit association which teaches people to quilt.

== Series ==
=== Ministry is Murder ===
- Blessed is the Busybody (2005)
- Let There Be Suspects (2006)
- Beware False Profits (2007)
- A Lie for a Lie (2009)
- A Truth for a Truth (10/2010)

=== Shenandoah Album ===
- Wedding Ring (2004)
- Endless Chain (2005)
- Lover's Knot (2006)
- Touching Stars (2007)
- Sister's Choice (2008)

=== MacDonalds Sisters ===
- Sweet Georgia Gal (1985)
- Sweet Sea Spirit (1986)
- Sweet Mockingbird's Call (1986)
- Sweet Mountain Magic (1986)
- Sweet Homecoming (1987)

=== Men of Midnight ===
- Duncan's Lady (1995)
- Iain Ross's Woman (1995)
- MacDougall's Darling (1995)

=== Maggie ===
- Lady of the Night (1986)
- Bayou Midnight (1987)

=== Tales of the Pacific ===
- From Glowing Embers (1988)
- Smoke Screen (1988)
- Rainbow Fire (1989)
- Out of the Ashes (1992)

=== Jensen ===
- Runaway (1990)
- Way Back Home (1990)
- Fugitive (1990)

=== Whiskey Isl. ===
- Whiskey Island (2000)
- Parting Glass (2003)

=== Gerritsen ===
- Iron Lace (1996)
- Rising Tides (1997)

=== Alden ===
- From a Distance (1992)
- Somewhere Out There (1993)

=== Shadows ===
- Desert Shadows (1991)
- Twilight Shadows (1991)

== Novels ==
- Brendan's Song (1985)
- Gilding the Lily (1985)
- The Unmasking (1985)
- Angel and the Saint (1986)
- Something So Right (1986)
- Good Time Man (1986)
- Season of Miracles (1986)
- Outback Nights (1987)
- Aloha Always (1987)
- All the Right Reasons (1988)
- Classic Encounter (1988)
- Island Glory (1989)
- All Those Years Ago (1991)
- One Perfect Rose (1992)
- Dragonslayer (1993)
- The Trouble with Joe (1994)
- Once More With Feeling (1996)
- Woman Without a Name (1996)
- Mail-order Matty (1996)
- Twice upon a Time (1997)
- One Moment Past Midnight (1999)
- Beautiful Lies (1999)
- Fox River (2001)
- Prospect Street (2002)

== Omnibus / Compilations ==
- Christmas Classics (1989) (with Joan Hohl)
- Birds Bees and Babies (1990) (with Jennifer Greene, Karen Keast)
- Mistletoe and Holly / Sweet Sea Spirit (1991) (with Janet Dailey)
- Desperate Needs (1995) (with Fern Michaels and Sherryl Woods)
- Outlaws and Lovers (1996) (with Naomi Horton, Kathleen Korbel)
- A Funny Thing Happened on the Way to the Delivery Room (1997) (with Kathleen Eagle, Kasey Michaels)
- A Mother's Gift (1998) (with Kathleen Eagle, Joan Elliott Pickart)
- Southern Gentlemen (1998) (with Jennifer Blake)
- A Mother's Day (2002) (with Elizabeth Bevarly, Marie Ferrarella)
- Maybe This Time (2003) (with Fern Michaels and Sherryl Woods)
- To the One I Love (2003) (with Allison Leigh, Peggy Moreland)
- More Than Words (2004) (with Susan Mallery, Carla Neggers, Brenda Novak, Diana Palmer)
- Mother's Love (2004) (with Elizabeth Bevarly, Marie Ferrarella)
- Nobody's Child / Older Woman / Royal MacAllister (2004) (with Joan Elliott Pickart, Cheryl Reavis)
- Love Undercover (2004) (with Merline Lovelace)
- A Mother's Touch: Way Home / Stranger's Son / Paternity Test (2005) (with Linda Howard and Sherryl Woods)
- Lady of the Night / Island Glory (2005)
- From This Day Forward (2005) (with Marie Ferrarella)

== Non-fiction ==
- "The Things We’ve Always Known" essay in North American Romance Writers (1999, ISBN 0810836041)

== Filmography ==
A series of German TV films

- Sehnsucht nach Neuseeland (2009, based on Smoke Screen)
- Das Paradies am Ende der Welt (2009, based on Out of the Ashes)
- Emilie Richards: Für immer Neuseeland (2010, based on Aloha Always)
- Emilie Richards: Zeit der Vergebung (2010, based on From Glowing Embers)
- Emilie Richards: Denk nur an uns beide (2010, based on Sweet Georgia Gal)
- Emilie Richards: Sehnsucht nach Sandy Bay (2011, based on Bayou Midnight)
- Emilie Richards: Sehnsucht nach Paradise Island (2011, based on Rainbow Fire)
- Emilie Richards: Entscheidung des Herzens (2011, based on Whiskey Island)
- Emilie Richards: Der Zauber von Neuseeland (2011, based on Duncan's Lady)
- Emilie Richards: Spuren der Vergangenheit (2012, based on Good Time Man)

== See also ==
- List of romantic novelists
