= Mortal Sin (disambiguation) =

A mortal sin, in Catholic theology, is a gravely sinful act, which can lead to damnation.

Mortal Sin(s) may also refer to:

== Film and television ==
- The Mortal Sin, an American lost 1917 silent film
- Mortal Sin (film), a 1970 Brazilian film
- Mortal Sin, a 1977 film featuring Paul Naschy
- Mortal Sins, a 1989 film featuring Debrah Farentino and James Saito
- Mortal Sins, a 1992 film featuring Lisa Vultaggio and Christopher Reeve
- "Mortal Sins" (Highlander), a 1995 television episode

== Other uses ==
- Mortal Sin (band), an Australian metal band
- Mortal Sins, a 2009 novel in the World of the Lupi series by Eileen Wilks
- Mortal Sins, a 2013 book by Michael D'Antonio
