= Sleepers =

Sleepers or The Sleepers may refer to:

- The plural form of any type of sleeper

== Film and television ==
- Sleepers (film), a 1996 American crime film
- Sleepers (TV series), a 1991 British comedy-drama series
- The Sleepers (TV series), a 2019 Czech drama series
- Sleepers (Spyashchiye), a 2017–2018 Russian miniseries
- "Sleepers" (Sanctuary), a 2009 episode of Sanctuary
- Sleepers, extraterrestrials in the American television series The Event

== Music ==
- The Sleepers (Chicago band), an American rock band formed in 2002
- The Sleepers (San Francisco band), a punk/post-punk band active from 1978 until 1981
- Sleepers (album), a solo album from rapper Big Pooh

== Other ==
- Le Sommeil (The Sleepers), an 1866 painting by Gustave Courbet
- "The Sleepers" (poem), by Walt Whitman
- Sleepers, the 1995 Lorenzo Carcaterra novel on which the film is based
- The Sleepers (New Hampshire), a pair of mountain peaks in the United States
- Seven Sleepers, in Christian and Islamic medieval folklore a group of youths who hid to escape ancient Roman persecution of Christians
- Railway sleepers, the rectangular supports used for the rails in railroad tracks.

== See also ==
- Sleeper (disambiguation)
