= Anne Marie Winston =

American writer

Anne Marie Rodgers
- Born: Pennsylvania, United States
- Occupation: Novelist
- Writing career
- Pen name: Anne Marie Winston
- Period: 1991–present
- Genre: romance
- Website: www.annemariewinston.com

Anne Marie Rodgers is an American writer of romance novels as Anne Marie Winston. Many of her novels have appeared on the USA Today Bestseller lists and she has served as both vice-president and retreat chairman of the Washington Romance Writers.

== Biography ==
Anne Marie Rodgers was born in Pennsylvania, United States. She is a former teacher, who loves reading, rescuing wildlife, cats and dogs.

She began writing romance novels in 1989 when she was a stay-at-home mother with two small children. Her first book, Best Kept Secrets was purchased by the Silhouette Desire line in 1991 and published under the pseudonym Anne Marie Winston.

Two of her novels, Substitute Wife and The Pregnant Princess, have been number one on the Waldenbooks bestsellers list, while several other novels have placed on the USA Today extended bestseller list. Her June 2001 release, A Most Desirable M.D., was described by Romantic Times Magazine as a "delicious love story with scorching scenes, two lovable characters, and brilliant story and character development," and was nominated for their award for 2001 Best Silhouette Desire.

Winston is a member of the Romance Writers of America and of Novelists, Inc. She has served as both vice-president and retreat chairman of the Washington Romance Writers, receiving their Magic Crystal Award for outstanding service to the chapter. In 1998, she was chosen to represent contemporary series romantic fiction at a Smithsonian Institution Writing Seminar.

== Bibliography ==
=== Single Novels ===
- Best Kept Secrets (1993)
- Island Baby (1993)
- Unlikely Eden (1993)
- Carolina on My Mind (1994)
- Substitute Wife (1994)
- Find Her, Keep Her (1994)
- Seducing the Proper Miss Miller (1998)
- Lovers' Reunion (1999)
- The Marriage Ultimatum (2004)
- Baby (2004)
- The Soldier's Seduction (2006)
- Holiday Confessions (2006)

=== American Heroes: Against All Odds Series Multi-Author ===
- Chance at a Lifetime (1995)

=== Kincaid Ranchers ===
1. Rancher's Wife (1995)
2. Rancher's Baby (1996)

=== Butler Country Brides Series ===
1. The Baby Consultant (1998)
2. Dedicated to Deirdre (1999)
3. The Bride Means Business (1999)

=== Royally Wed Series Multi-Author ===
- The Pregnant Princess (2000)

=== Men Of The Badlands Series ===
1. Seduction, Cowboy Style (2000)
2. Rancher's Proposition (2000)
3. Tall, Dark and Western (2001)

=== Fortunes of Texas Series Multi-Author ===
- A Most Desirable MD (2001)

=== 20 Amber Court Series Multi-Author ===
- Risque Business (2001)

=== Billionaire Bachelors Series ===
1. Billionaire Bachelors: Ryan (2002)
2. Billionaire Bachelors: Stone (2002)
3. Billionaire Bachelors: Garrett (2002)
4. Billionaire Bachelors: Gray (2003)

=== Family Secrets Series Multi-Author ===
- Pyramid of Lies (2003)

=== Dynasties the Barones Series Multi-Author ===
- Born to Be Wild (2003)

=== Mantalk Series ===
- For Services Rendered (2004)

=== Dynasties the Danforths Series Multi-Author ===
- The Enemy's Daughter (2004)

=== Logan's Legacy Series Multi-Author ===
- The Homecoming (2005)

=== Collections ===
- Soldier's Seduction / Betrothed for the Baby

=== Omnibus In Collaboration ===
- Naughty, Naughty (1999) (with Susan Johnson, Adrianne Lee and Leandra Logan)
- Baby Me Mine: Find Her, Keep Her / An Unexpected Addition (2002) (with Terese Ramin)
- Millionaire's Marriage Deal (2002) (with Eileen Wilks)
- The Bachelorette / Risque Business (2002) (with Kate Little)
- The Playboy Sheikh / Billionaire Bachelors: Stone (2002) (with Alexandra Sellers)
- Broken Silence (2003) (with Maggie Shayne and Eileen Wilks)
- Billionaire Bachelors: Garrett / In Blackhawk's Bed (2003) (with Barbara McCauley)
- The Blackhawk Bride / Billionaire Bachelors: Gray (2004) (with Barbara McCauley)
- The Marriage Ultimatum / The Long Hot Summer (2004) (with Rochelle Alers)
- Expecting the Sheikh's Baby / Born to be Wild (2004) (with Kristi Gold)
- Enemy's Daughter / Stone Cold Surrender (2004) (with Brenda Jackson)
- The Romance Collection (2004) (with B.J. Daniels and Marilyn Pappano)
- The Marriage Ultimatum / Slow Dancing with a Texan (2005) (with Linda Conrad)
- An Office Affair (2005) (with Justine Davis)
- The Enemy's Daughter / The Laws of Passion (2005) (with Linda Conrad)
- Lost in Sensation / For Services Rendered (2005) (with Maureen Child)
- Soldier's Seduction / Betrothed for the Baby (2007) (with Kathie DeNosky)

== Awards ==
- 1991 Magic Crystal Award for Outstanding Service from Washington Romance Writers
- Carolina on my mind: 1994 Reviewers' Choice Award for Best Silhouette Desire from Romantic Times Magazine
- The Maine Attraction: 2000 Golden Leaf Best Novella Award from New Jersey Romance Writers
- The pregnant princess: 2000 Golden Leaf Best Short Contemporary Award from New Jersey Romance Writers
- Billionaire Bachelors: Ryan: 2002 Golden Leaf Best Short Contemporary Award from New Jersey Romance Writers

== See also ==
- List of romantic novelists
