= Karen Young =

Karen Young may refer to:

- Karen Young (actress) (born 1958), American film and TV actress
- Karen Young (author), American romance novelist of the late 20th / early 21st centuries
- Karen Young (American singer) (1951–1991), disco singer, one-hit-wonder of the late 1970s
- Karen Young (British singer) (born 1946), released several singles in the late 1960s
- Karen Young (Canadian singer) (born 1951), singer and composer
- Karen Young (cricketer) (born 1968), Irish cricketer
- Karen Lewis Young (born 1951), American politician in the Maryland House of Delegates
- Karen Young, one of the pseudonyms of Mary Millington (1945–1979)
