= Edge of Paradise (disambiguation) =

Edge of Paradise is an American metal band.

The Edge of Paradise may also refer to:

- The Edge of Paradise, a non-fiction work by P. F. Kluge
- The Edge of Paradise, a romance novel by Peggy Webb
- "The Edge of Paradise", a track from Kamelot's 2003 album Epica
