= Karen Rose Smith =

American author

- Born: December 21, 19?? Pennsylvania, U.S.
- Occupation: Novelist
- Writing career
- Pen name: Karen Rose Smith; Kari Sutherland
- Period: 1991–present
- Genre: Romantic novel
- Website: www.karenrosesmith.com

Karen Rose Smith is an American author born in Pennsylvania. Her first romance was published in 1992; her 97th novel, a mystery, will be published in 2017. It is the sixth in her eight book Caprice De Luca Home Staging mystery series. Her Daisy's Tea Garden mystery series will begin in 2018. She has written for Meteor/Kismet, Kensington, Silhouette and Harlequin. She has also indie-published novels and short story collections in e-book format. Twice a winner of New Jersey's Golden Leaf Award in Short Contemporary Romance, she has also been honored with CRA's Award Of Excellence for short contemporary, as well as the Golden Quill for Traditional Romance. Her romances have made the USA TODAY list and Amazon's romance bestseller list. Her mystery, Staged To Death, climbed to #1 on Amazon's cozy mystery bestseller list. Married, she spends her days writing, gardening, cooking and keeping her four rescued cats company.

== Bibliography ==
=== Cozy Mysteries ===
- Staged to Death (2013)
- Deadly Decor (2014)
- Gilt By Association (2015)
- Drape Expectations (2015)
- Silence of the Lamps (2016)

=== Search for Love E-book Series ===
- Nathan's Vow (2011)
- Jake's Bride (2011)
- Always Devoted (2011)
- Always Her Cowboy (2011)
- Heartfire (2011)
- Cassidy's Cowboy (2011)
- Her Sister (2013)

=== The Mommy Club Series ===
- Wanted: A Real Family (2013)
- A Match Made By Baby (2014)
- The Cowboy's Secret Baby (2015)

=== Single Novels ===
- A Man Worth Loving(1992)
- Garden of Fantasy (1992)
- Love in bloom (1993)
- Because of Francie (1993)
- Abigail and Mistletoe (1994)
- The Sheriff's Proposal
- Marry Me, Cowboy (1996)
- Toys And Wishes (1996)
- Forever After (1996)
- Ribbons And Rainbows (1997)
- Kit And Kisses (1997)
- The Dad Who Saved Christmas (1997)
- Mom Meets Dad (1999)
- Expecting the CEO's Baby (2003)
- His Little Girl's Laughter (2003)
- Most Eligible Doctor (2003)
- Once Upon a Baby... (2004)
- Which Child Is Mine? (2004)
- Their Baby Bond (2004)
- Twelfth Night Proposal (2005)
- To Protect and Cherish (2006)
- The Bracelet: Everlasting Love (2007)

=== Darling Daddies Series ===
- Adam's Vow (1995)
- Always Daddy (1995)
- Shane's Bride (1995)

=== The Best Men Series ===
- Cowboy at the Wedding (1996)
- Most Eligible Dad (1996)
- A Groom and a Promise (1996)

=== Do You Take This Stranger? Series ===
- Wealth, Power and a Proper Wife (1998)
- Love, Honor and a Pregnant Bride (1998)
- Promises, Pumpkins and Prince Charming (1998)
- Wishes, Waltzes and a Storybook Wedding (1999)

=== Loving the Boss Series Multi-Author ===
- The Night Before Baby (1999)

=== Coleburn Brothers Series ===
- Just the Husband She Chose (2000)
- Just the Man She Needed (2000)

=== Storkville, USA Series Multi-Author ===
- Her Honor-Bound Lawman (2000)

=== Tall, Dark and True Series ===
- Tall, Dark and True (2001)
- Her Tycoon Boss (2001)
- Doctor In Demand (2001)

=== Fortunes of Texas Series Multi-Author ===
- Marry in Haste (2001)

=== Virgin Brides Series Multi-Author ===
- The Marriage Clause (2002)

=== Crown and Glory Series Multi-Author ===
- Searching for Her Prince (2002)

=== Soulmates Series Multi-Author ===
- A Husband in Her Eyes (2002)
- With One Touch (2003)

=== Logan's Legacy Series Multi-Author ===
- A Precious Gift (2004)
- Take a Chance on Me (2004)

=== Montana Mavericks Series Multi-Author ===
- Cabin Fever (2005)
- From Doctor...To Daddy (2010)
- His Country Cinderella (2011)

=== Fortunes of Texas: Reunion Series Multi-Author ===
- The Good Doctor (2005)

=== Baby Bonds Series ===
- Custody for Two (2006)
- The Baby Trail (2006)
- Expecting His Brother's Baby (2006)

=== Talk of the Neighborhood Series Multi-Author ===
- The Super Mom (2006)

=== Logan's Legacy Revisited Series Multi-Author ===
- Falling for the Texas Tycoon (2007)

=== Dad's in Progress ===
- The Daddy Dilemma
- The Daddy Plan
- The Daddy Verdict

=== The Baby Experts Series ===
- Lullaby For Two (2009)
- The Midwife's Glass Slipper (2009)
- Baby By Surprise (2009)
- The Texas Billionaire's Baby (2010)
- The Texan's Happily-Ever-After (2010)
- Twins Under His Tree (2010)

=== Reunion Brides ===
- His Daughter...Their Child (2011)
- Once Upon A Groom (2011)
- The CEO's Unexpected Proposal (2012)
- Riley's Baby Boy (2012)

=== Collections ===
- Bachelor / Precious Gift (2004)
- Gold Rush Grooms / Cabin Fever (2005)

=== Omnibus in Collaboration ===
- Searching for Her Prince / The Royal Treatment (2003) (with Maureen Child)
- A Perfect Pair / Their Baby Bond (2004) (with Jen Safrey)
- Bluegrass Baby / Take a Chance on Me (2004) (with Judy Duarte)
- Say I Do (2005) (with Sara Orwig)
- Secret Admirer (2005) (with Ann Major and Christine Rimmer)
- A Precious Gift / Child of Her Heart (2005) (with Cheryl St. John)
- Secret Seduction / Which Child is Mine? (2005) (with Cathy Gillen Thacker)
- From Here to Maternity (2006) (with Inglath Cooper and Tara Taylor Quinn) (The Second Chance / Promoted to Mom / On Angel's Wings)

=== Single Novels ===
- Wish on the Moon (1992)
- Heartfire, Homefire (1993)

=== Single Novels ===
- It Happened One Wedding Night (2000)
- One Wedding Night (2001)
- Wed to the Witness (2002)
- Formula, Father (2003)
- Hot On His Trail (2004)

=== Omnibus in Collaboration ===
- A Montana Christmas (1999) (with Susan Mallery)
