= Maureen Child =

American novelist (born 1951)

- Born: September 28, 1951 (age 74); Southern California, US
- Occupation: Novelist
- Writing career
- Pen name: Maureen Child, Ann Carberry, Kathleen Kane, Sarah Hart, Regan Hastings
- Period: 1990–present
- Genre: Romance
- Website: www.maureenchild.com

Maureen Child (born September 28, 1951, in Southern California, United States) is an American writer who wrote over 50 romance novels since 1990. She has written under the pen names Ann Carberry, Kathleen Kane, Sara Hart and Regan Hastings.

== Biography ==
Child was born on September 28, 1951, in California, United States. She is married, they have two children and a golden retriever, Abbey. She continues to live in Southern California.

She published her first novels in 1990.

== Bibliography ==
=== As Maureen Child ===
==== Stand alones novels ====
- Run Wild My Heart (1992)
- Bandit's Lady (1995)
- Have Bride, Need Groom (1997)
- The Surprise Christmas Bride (1997)
- Maternity Bride (1998)
- Sleeping with the Boss (2003)
- Kiss Me, Cowboy! (2003)
- Loving You (2003)
- Some Kind of Wonderful (2004)
- And Then Came You (2004)
- Lost in Sensation: Mantalk (2004)
- A Crazy Kind of Love (2004)
- Turn My World Upside Down: Jo's Story (2005)
- Expecting Lonergan's Baby (2006)
- The Part-Time Wife (2006)
- Eternally (2006)
- Nevermore (2007)
- More Than Fiends (2007)
- Scorned By The Boss (2007)
- Seduced By The Rich Man (2007)
- Captured By the Billionaire (2007)
- A Fiend in Need (2008)

==== Bachelor Battalion Series ====
1. Littlest Marine(1998)
2. The Non-commissioned Baby (1998)
3. The Oldest Living Married Virgin (1998)
4. Colonel Daddy (1998)
5. Mom in Waiting (1999)
6. Marine Under the Mistletoe (1999)
7. The Daddy Salute (2000)
8. The Last Santini Virgin (2000)
9. The Next Santini Bride (2000)
10. Marooned with a Marine (2000)
11. Prince Charming in Dress Blues (2001)
12. His Baby! (2001)
13. Last Virgin in California (2001)
14. The Marine and the Debutante (2002)

===== Candello Sub-Series =====
1. The Oldest Living Married Virgin (1998)
2. Colonel Daddy (1999)

===== The Santini & The Paretti Sub-Series =====
1. Marine Under the Mistletoe (1999)
2. The Last Santini Virgin (2000)
3. The Next Santini Bride (2000)
4. Marooned with a Marine (2000)
5. Prince Charming in Dress Blues (2001)

===== Rogan Sub-Series =====
1. His Baby! (2001)
2. Last Virgin in California (2001)

==== Fortunes of Texas Series Multi-Author ====
- Did You Say Twins?! (2001)

==== Dynasties the Connellys Series Multi-Author ====
- The Seal's Surrender (2002)

==== Crown and Glory Series Multi-Author ====
- The Royal Treatment (2002)

==== Dynasties the Barones Series Multi-Author ====
- Beauty and the Blue Angel (2003)

==== Merlyn County Midwives Series Multi-Author ====
- Forever... Again (2004)

==== Dynasties the Danforths Series Multi-Author ====
- Man Beneath the Uniform (2004)

==== Three-Way Wager Series ====
1. The Tempting Mrs. Reilly (2005)
2. Whatever Reilly Wants... (2005)
3. The Last Reilly Standing (2005)

==== Dynasties the Ashtons Series Multi-Author ====
3. Society-Page Seduction (2005)

==== Lonergan's Summer Of Secrets Series ====
1. Expecting Lonergan's Baby / Sins of His Past (2007) (with Roxanne St. Claire)
2. Strictly Lonergan's Business / Durango Affair (2006) (with Brenda Jackson) & Strictly Lonergan's Business / Pregnant with the First Heir (2007) (with Sara Orwig)
3. Satisfying Lonergan's Honor (2006) & Satisfying Lonergan's Honour / Revenge of the Second Son (2007) (with Sara Orwig)

==== Candellano Family Trilogy ====
1. Finding You (2015)
2. Knowing You (2015)

==== Signet Eclipse ====
1. Bedeviled (2009)
2. Beguiled: A Queen of the Otherworld Novel (2009)

==== Fortunes of Texas: Reunion Series Multi-Author ====
- Fortune's Legacy (2006)

==== Hotel Marchand Series Multi-Author ====
- Bourbon Street Blues (2006)

==== Dynasty the Elliotts Series Multi-Author ====
- Beyond The Boardroom (2006)

==== Millionaire of the Month Series Multi-Author ====
- Thirty Day Affair (2007)

==== Collections ====
- Finding You / Knowing You (2003)
- Seducing Reilly / Tempting Mrs Reilly / Whatever Reilly Wants... (2006)

==== Omnibus In Collaboration ====
- Shotgun Grooms (2001) (with Susan Mallery)
- Special Delivery (2002) (with B.J. James)
- Secret Child (2002) (with Alexandra Sellers)
- Up Close and Passionate (2002) (with Alexandra Sellers)
- The Romance Collection (2002) (with Marie Ferrarella and Sharon Sala)
- Love Is Murder (2003) (with Rebecca Brandewyne and Linda Winstead Jones)
- The Marine and the Debutante / Wild About a Texan (2003) (with Jan Hudson)
- The Sheikh Takes a Bride / The Seal's Surrender (2003) (with Caroline Cross)
- Searching for Her Prince / The Royal Treatment (2003) (with Karen Rose Smith)
- His Christmas Bride (2003) (with Dallas Schulze)
- Kiss Me, Cowboy! / The Tycoon's Lady (2004) (with Katherine Garbera)
- Man Beneath the Uniform / Playing by the Baby Rules (2004) (with Michelle Celmer)
- Where There's Smoke... / Beauty and The Blue Angel (2004) (with Barbara McCauley)
- Dynasties: Summer in Savannah (2004) (with Barbara McCauley and Sheri Whitefeather)
- His Virgin Seductress (2004) (with Linda Turner)
- Sheik and the Princess in Waiting / Forever...Again (2004) (with Susan Mallery)
- Sleeping with the Boss / The Cowboy's Baby Surprise (2004) (with Linda Conrad)
- Summer Surrender (2004) (with Peggy Webb)
- The Cinderella Scandal / Man Beneath the Uniform (2004) (with Barbara McCauley)
- Lost in Sensation / Very Private Duty (2005) (with Rochelle Alers)
- Tempting Mrs. Reilly / Bedroom Secrets (2005) (with Michelle Celmer)
- Lost in Sensation / For Services Rendered (2005) (with Anne Marie Winston)
- Whatever Reilly Wants... / Sultan's Bed (2005) (with Laura Wright)
- Last Reilly Standing / Craving Beauty (2005) (with Nalini Singh)
- Society-Page Seduction / Just A Taste (2006) (with Bronwyn Jameson)
- Her Fifth Husband? / Last Reilly Standing (2006) (with Dixie Browning)
- His Virgin Temptress (2006) (with Eileen Wilks)
- For the Twins (2006) (with Joan Elliott Pickart)
- Christmas Together (2006) (with Allison Leigh)
- The Connellys: Chance, Doug And Justin (2007) (with Metsy Hingle and Kate Little)

=== As Ann Carberry ===
==== Single novels ====
- Frontier Bride (1992)
- Nevada Heat (1993)
- Shotgun Bride (1993)
- Runaway Bride (1994)
- Scoundrel (1995)
- Maggie and the Gambler (1995)
- Frannie and the Charmer (1996)
- Alice and the Gunfighter (1996)

=== As Kathleen Kane ===
==== Single novels ====
- Mountain Dawn (1992)
- Small Treasures (1993)
- Charms (1995)
- Wishes (1995)
- A Pocketful of Paradise (1997)
- Still Close to Heaven (1997)
- Dreamweaver (1998)
- This Time for Keeps (1998)
- Simply Magic (1999)
- The Soul Collector (1999)
- Catch a Fallen Angel (2000)
- Wish Upon a Cowboy (2000)
- Just West of Heaven (2001)
- When the Halo Falls (2002)

==== Town Called Harmony Series ====
1. Coming Home (1994)
2. Keeping Faith (1994)

==== Omnibus in Collaboration ====
- Sweet Hearts (1993) (with Jill Marie Landis, Colleen Quinn and Jodi Thomas)
- Hearts of Gold (1994) (with Kay Hooper, Karen Lockwood and Bonnie K. Winn)
- Perfect Secrets (1999) (with Brenda Joyce, Judith O'Brien and Delia Parr)

=== As Regan Hastings ===
==== Single novels ====
- Whispers from Heaven (1996)

=== As Regan Hastings ===
==== Awakening ====
1. Visions of Magic (2011)
2. Visions of Skyfire (2011)
3. Visions of Chains (2012)

== References and sources ==
- Maureen Child's Official Website
- Maureen Child at eHarlequin
- Maureen Child at Mills & Boon
