= Christine Rimmer =

American writer

- Born: January 28; California, U.S.
- Occupation: Novelist
- Writing career
- Period: 1984–present
- Genre: Romance
- Website: www.christinerimmer.com

Christine Rimmer (born January 28 in California, U.S.) is a USA Today and Waldenbooks bestselling U.S. writer of over 60 romance novels, which she began writing in 1987. She also published poems and short stories in a number of small literary journals.

== Biography ==
Christine Rimmer was born on January 28 in California, U.S., where her maternal grandfather were a gold miner.

She obtained a theater degree in Sacramento, and then she went to New York City to study acting. She worked as a write-up girl at Barney's, a caterer's assistant, a waitress, a bartender, a phone sales rep, a janitor, receivable clerk, an accounts payable, a teacher, a model, an actress...

Later, she moved to Southern California, where she began her writing career with short stories, plays, and poems. Her poems and short stories were published in a number of small literary journals. In 1984, she wrote her first romantic novel, that was published in 1987.

She now lives in Washington State with her husband, their sons and two cats, Tom and Ed.

== Bibliography ==
=== Single novels ===
- The Road Home (1987)
- No Turning Back (1988)
- Call it Fate (1988)
- Double Dare (1990)
- Temporary Temptress (1990)
- Earth Angel (1991)
- Hard Luck Lady (1991)
- Midsummer Madness (1992)
- Counterfeit Bride (1993)
- Born Innocent (1993)
- For the Baby's Sake (1994)
- Husband in Training (1999)
- Ralphie's Wives (2007)
- Bet On It (2007)
- Valentine's Secret Child (2008)

=== Close to Home Series Multi-Author ===
- Slow Larkin's Revenge (1991)

=== Jones Gang Series ===
1. Wagered Woman (1993)
2. Man of the Mountain (1994)
3. Sweetbriar Summit (1994)
4. A Home for the Hunter (1994)
5. Sunshine and the Shadow Master (1995)
6. The Man, the Moon and the Marriage Vow (1996)
7. No Less Than a Lifetime (1996)
8. Honeymoon Hotline (1996)
9. A Hero for Sophie Jones (1998)
10. The Taming of Billy Jones (1998)
11. Husband In Training (1999)
- Marriage: Jones Style: Wagered Woman / Man of the Mountain / A Home for the Hunter (omnibus) (2001)

=== Beaudine Sisters Series ===
1. Cat's Cradle (1995)
2. Midnight Rider Takes a Bride (1997)

=== Fortune's Children Series Multi-Author ===
- Wife Wanted (1997)

=== The Bravos Series ===
1. The Prince's Secret Baby

==== Conveniently Yours Sub-Series ====
1. The Nine-month Marriage (1997)
2. Marriage by Necessity (1998)
3. Practically Married (1999)
4. Married by Accident (1999)
5. The Millionaire She Married (2000)
6. The M.D. She Had to Marry (2000)
7. The Marriage Agreement (2001)
8. The Bravo Billionaire (2001)
9. The Marriage Conspiracy (2001)
- Bravo Family Ties: The Nine-month Marriage / Marriage By Necessity / Practically Married (Omnibus) (2002)
- Bravo Brides: The Millionaire She Married / The M.D. She Had To Marry (omnibus) (2005)

==== The Sons Of Caitlin Bravo Sub-Series ====
1. His Executive Sweetheart (2002)
2. Mercury Rising (2002)
3. Scrooge and the Single Girl (2002)

==== Bravo Family Ties Sub-Series ====
1. Fifty Ways to Say: I'm Pregnant (2004)
2. Marrying Molly (2004)
3. Lori's Little Secret (2006)
4. Bravo Unwrapped (2006)
5. The Bravo Family Way (2006)
6. Married In Haste (2006)
7. From Here To Paternity (2007)
8. A Bravo Christmas Reunion (2007)
9. Valentine's Secret Child (2008)
10. Having Tanner Bravo's Baby (2008)
11. The Stranger And Tessa Jones (2009)
12. The Bravo Bachelor (2009)
13. A Bravo's Honor (2009)
14. Christmas at Bravo Ridge (2009)
15. Valentine Bride (2010)
16. A Bride for Jericho Bravo (2010)
17. Expecting the Boss's Baby (2010)
18. Donovan's Child (2011)
19. Marriage, Bravo Style! (2011)

=== Prescription Marriage Series Multi-Author ===
- Dr. Devastating (1998)
- A Doctor's Vow (1999)

=== Montana Mavericks Series Multi-Author ===
- Cinderella's Big Sky Groom (1999)
- Stranded with the Groom (2005)

=== Stockwells of Texas Series Multi-Author ===
- The Tycoon's Instant Daughter (2001)

=== Lone Star Country Club Series Multi-Author ===
- Stroke of Fortune (2002)

=== Viking Brides Series ===
1. The Reluctant Princess (2003)
2. The Marriage Medallion (2003)
3. Prince and the Future... Dad? (2003)
4. The Man Behind the Mask (2004)

=== Talk of the Neighborhood Series Multi-Author ===
- The Reluctant Cinderella (2006)

=== Montana Mavericks Striking it Rich Series Multi-Author ===
- The Man Who Had Everything (2007)

=== Omnibus in collaboration ===
- Help Wanted--Angel! (1995) (with Annette Broadrick and Justine Davis) (Loving Spirit / Earth Angel / Angel for Hire)
- Montana Mavericks: Big Sky Brides (2000) (with Jennifer Greene and Cheryl St. John)
- Single Dad Seeks (2000) (with Jennifer Greene) (Sweetbriar Summit / Heat Wave)
- Convenient Vows (2001) (with Laurie Paige)
- Montana Weddings (2001) (with Jennifer Greene and Cheryl St. John)
- The Debutantes (2002) (with Beverly Barton and Ann Major) (Jenna's Wild Ride / reinventing Mary / frankie's First Dress)
- One More Time (2003) (with Lynne Graham and Jayne Ann Krentz)
- Mother by Design (2004) (with Susan Mallery and Laurie Paige)
- Almost to the Altar (2004) (with Leanne Banks)
- The Country Club / The Debutantes (2004) (with Beverly Barton and Ann Major)
- Isabelle / Diana / Suzanna (2004) (with Jennifer Greene and Cheryl St. John)
- Fifty Ways to Say I'm Pregnant / One Perfect Man (2004) (with Lynda Sandoval)
- To Love and Protect / Rachel's Bundle of Joy (2004) (with Susan Mallery and Pamela Toth)
- Family Homecoming / Cinderella's Big Sky Groom (2004) (with Laurie Paige)
- Marrying Molly / Prince's Bride (2004) (with Lois Faye Dyer)
- Secret Admirer (2005) (with Ann Major and Karen Rose Smith)
- Lori's Little Secret / Worth Fighting for (2005) (with Judy Duarte)
- Millionaire Bridegrooms (2006) (with Peggy Moreland)
- Her Fiance (2007) (with Allison Leigh)
- Instant Family! (2007) (with Marie Ferrarella)

== Awards ==
- Romantic Times BOOK Reviewer's Choice Award Winner for best Silhouette Special Edition.

== References and sources ==
- Christine Rimmer's Official Website
- Christine Rimmer at eHarlequin
- Christine Rimmer at Fantastic Fiction

== See also ==
- List of novelists from the United States
