= Brittany Young =

STEM educator, CEO, and TED fellow

- Born: West Baltimore
- Education: Baltimore City Public Schools; Baltimore Polytechnic Institute; Baltimore City Community College
- Awards: TED fellow
- Website: B-360

Brittany Young is an engineer, STEM educator, and 2020 TED fellow. She is the founder and chief executive officer of B-360, an education program that supports under-served youth. She was the 2018 Echoing Green Black Male Achievement Fellow.

== Early life and education ==
Young is from Western Baltimore. She was a student in the Baltimore City Public Schools, and says she had made her mind up about her career by the third grade. She eventually secured a place in engineering at the Baltimore Polytechnic Institute, which she graduated in 2007. She started working as engineer and simultaneously taught courses at Baltimore City Community College. In 2015 she started working in education and outreach after she realised that engineering education could be used to unite culture.

== Career ==
Young is founder and chief executive officer of the nonprofit B-360, an education programme that supports disconnected young people and adults. B-360 makes use of dirtbike culture to build bridges between different communities. During the program participants learn about road safety, the mechanics of bike upkeep, bike customisation and how to use 3D printers. She was awarded a Baltimore Corps Elevation Award to develop the idea, creating a dirtbike version of the X Games. In 2017 Young left her career in engineering to concentrate on B-360, and was supported by the Warnock Foundation. That year she won the Black Girl Ventures first entrepreneurship competition in Baltimore.

She was awarded a 2018 Echoing Green Black Male Achievement Fellow. In 2020 Young was selected as a TED fellow. She will deliver a TED talk at the 2020 TED conference in Vancouver.

=== Awards and honours ===
Her awards and honours include:

- 2017 Boss Up Baltimore Black Girl Ventures Pitch Competition
- 2018 Echoing Green Black Male Achievement Fellow
- 2018 Warnock Foundation Social Innovator of the Year
- 2018 Open Society Foundation Baltimore Community Fellow
- 2020 TED fellow
