= Peggy Moreland =

American novelist

Peggy Bozeman Morse
- Born: Unknown; Texas, United States
- Education: Stephen F. Austin State University (BBA); University of Central Oklahoma
- Occupation: Novelist
- Writing career
- Pen name: Peggy Moreland, Peggy Morse
- Period: 1987–present
- Genre: Romance
- Website: www.peggymoreland.com

Peggy Morse, née Bozeman (born in Texas, United States) well known as Peggy Moreland is a USA Today and Waldenbooks bestselling American writer of over 40 romance novels since 1989. She also signed a novel with her married name Peggy Morse.

== Biography ==
Peggy Bozeman was born Taurus in Texas, United States. She grew up with her two sisters in a farm. Her father died when she was in high school, leaving her mother to raise her three daughters alone.

Peggy received a Bachelor of Business Administration degree from Stephen F. Austin State University, with a minor in English. She worked on her master's degree in writing at the University of Central Oklahoma. She co-wrote the story of the Edmond post office shooting for Norman Vincent Peale's Guideposts magazine. Later, in 1987 she began to write romantic novels, and she was published in 1989.

Peggy married a Texan green beret. They have three children and live on a ranch in the Texas Hill Country, near her parents farm. There, she has cattle, goats and other critters, including her owner of a registered quarter horse. 1997 she fulfilled a lifelong dream by competing in her first rodeo and brought home two silver championship buckles, one for Champion Barrel Racer, and a second for All-Around Cowgirl.

== Bibliography ==
=== As Peggy Moreland ===
==== Single novels ====
- Little Bit of Country (1989)
- Miss Prim (1991)
- The Rescuer (1993)
- The Baby Doctor (1994)
- Seven Year Itch (1994)
- Miss Lizzy's Legacy (1995)
- A Willful Marriage (1996)
- Rugrats and Rawhide (1997)
- Billionaire Bridegroom (1999)
- Groom of Fortune (2000)
- The Way to a Rancher's Heart (2001)
- Millionaire Boss (2001)
- The Texan's Tiny Secret (2001)

==== American Heroes: Against All Odds Series Multi-Author ====
- Run for the Roses (1990)

==== Trouble In Texas Series ====
- A Little Texas Two-Step (1997)
- Lone Star Kind of Man (1997)
- Marry Me, Cowboy (1997)

==== Texas Brides Series ====
1. The Rancher's Spitting Image (1998)
2. The Restless Virgin (1998)
3. A Sparkle in the Cowboy's Eyes (1998)
4. That McCloud Woman (1999)
5. Hard Loving Man (2000)

==== Texas Grooms Series ====
1. Ride a Wild Heart (2000)
2. In Name Only (2000)
3. Slow Waltz Across Texas (2000)

==== Texas Cattleman's Club : The Last Bachelor Series Multi-Author ====
- Her Lone Star Protector (2002)

==== Lone Star Country Club Series Multi-Author ====
- An Arranged Marriage (2002)

==== "T" Of Texas Or Tanner Series ====
1. Five Brothers and a Baby (2003)
2. Baby, Your Mine (2003)
3. Tanner's Millions (2004)
4. The Last Good Man in Texas (2004)
5. Sins of a Tanner (2004)
6. Tanner Ties (2005)

==== Fortunes of Texas: Reunion Series Multi-Author ====
- In the Arms of the Law (2005)

==== A Piece Of Texas Series ====
1. The Texan's Forbidden Affair (2006)
2. The Texan's Convenient Marriage (2006)
3. The Texan's Honor-Bound Promise (2006)
4. The Texan's Business Proposition (2007)
5. The Texan's Secret Past (2007)

==== Dakota Fortunes Series Multi-Author ====
- Merger of Fortunes (2007)

==== Collections ====
- Baby, You're Mine / Awakening Beauty (2004)
- Five Brothers and a Baby / Baby, You're Mine (2005)
- The Last Good Man in Texas / Sins of a Tanner (2005)

==== Omnibus In Collaboration ====
- One Hundred Per Cent Male (2001) (with Alexandra Sellers)
- Turning Point (2002) (with Paula Detmer Riggs and Sharon Sala)
- Millionaire Marriages (2002) (with Leanne Banks)
- The Bounty / A Little Texas Two-Step (2002) (with Rebecca Brandewyne)
- His Kind of Woman (2002) (with Fayrene Preston)
- Her Lone Star Protector / Tall, Dark...and Framed? (2003) (with Cathleen Galitz)
- To the One I Love (2003) (with Allison Leigh and Emilie Richards)
- Last Good Man in Texas / At Any Price (2004) (with Margaret Allison)
- Sins of A Tanner / Principles and Pleasures (2005) (with Margaret Allison)
- Resolved to (Re) Marry / Tanner Ties (2005) (with Carole Buck)
- Boss Man / Tanner Ties (2006) (with Diana Palmer)
- Millionaire Bridegrooms (2006) (with Christine Rimmer)
- Forbidden Affair / Tempt Me (2006) (with Caroline Cross)
- The Convenient Marriage / Reunion of Revenge (2007) (with Kathie DeNosky)
- Honour-Bound Promise / Bedded Then Wed (2007) (with Heidi Betts)

=== As Peggy Morse ===
==== Single novels ====
- The Stillman Curse (1992)

== Awards ==
- Winner of the National Readers' Choice Award

== References and sources ==
- Peggy Moreland's Official Website
- Peggy Moreland's Webpage in Harlequin Enterprises Ltd
