= Peggy Webb (writer) =

American novelist

Peggy Elaine Hussey Webb
- Born: February 8, 1942 (age 84); Mooreville, Mississippi, U.S.
- Occupation: Novelist
- Writing career
- Pen name: Peggy Webb, Anna Michaels, Elaine Hussey
- Period: 1981–present
- Genre: Romance
- Website: www.peggywebb.com

Peggy Webb, née Peggy Elaine Hussey (born February 8, 1942) is an American author who got her start publishing romance novels. She has also written cozy mysteries, crime thrillers, and literary fiction.

== Biography ==
Peggy Webb has born and raised on a farm in Lee County, Mississippi. As a child she would often sit in the hayloft and write down her stories. Her first publication came through her husband, the owner of a water well contracting business. As the secretary of the state trade organization, he was responsible for publishing a newsletter. Webb assisted him with the newsletter, and, to fill space, began a humor column. This was picked up in the late 1960s by two trade magazines, The Water Well Journal and Ground Water Age. Over two hundred of her columns were published.

In 1984, while writing her master's thesis at the University of Mississippi, Webb wrote her first romance novel. Her first novel was rejected because publishers thought it had too much comedy and not enough romance. Bantam Books purchased her second novel, Taming Maggie, and, in order to complete the revisions Bantam required, Webb had to postpone the defense of her thesis. She did eventually receive her M.A. in fine arts, the same summer that her first novel was released. Taming Maggie, reached number one on the Waldenbooks bestseller list, earning her their award for Bestselling New Romance Author. With its success, Bantam rethought their rejection of Webb's first novel. After she made changes to further emphasize the romance, Bantam published the book as Birds of a Feather. This novel reached number two on the romance bestseller list, and is considered to be the first true comedic romance.

Webb currently writes for Harlequin and Silhouette. Her novels for them are published in approximately 17 languages. She is a five-time nominee for Romantic Times Reviewer's Choice Awards.

Webb currently lives outside Tupelo, Mississippi.

== Bibliography ==
=== Novels ===
- Birds of a Feather (1985)
- Taming Maggie (1985)
- Tarnished Armor (1986)
- Donovan's Angel (1986)
- Duplicity (1986)
- Scamp of Saltillo (1986)
- Disturbing the Peace (1987)
- The Joy Bus (1987)
- Summer Jazz (1987)
- Private Lives (1987)
- Sleepless Nights (1988)
- Hallie's Destiny (1988)
- Gift for Tenderness (1989)
- When Joanna Smiles (1989)
- Any Thursday (1989)
- Higher Than Eagles (1989)
- Harvey's Missing (1990)
- Valley of Fire (1990)
- Until Morning Comes (1990)
- Venus De Molly (1990)
- Saturday Mornings (1990)
- Beloved Stranger (1991)
- Tiger Lady (1991)
- That Jones Girl (1991)
- The Secret Life of Elizabeth McCade (1991)
- Touched by Angels (1992)
- Angel at Large (1992)
- 13 Royal Street (1992)
- The Edge of Paradise (1992)
- Dark Fire (1992)
- Where Dolphins Go (1993)
- A Prince for Jenny (1993)
- Witch Dance (1994)
- Only His Touch (1994)
- Can't Stop Loving You (1995)
- From a Distance (1995)
- Naughty and Nice (1996)
- Indiscreet (1996)
- Bringing Up Baxter (1997)
- Night of the Dragon (1998)
- Only Yesterday (1998)
- Angels on Zebras (1998)
- Invitation to a Wedding (2001)
- Warrior's Embrace (2001)
- Summer Hawk (2001)
- Standing Bear's Surrender (2001)
- The Smile of an Angel (2001)
- Bittersweet Passion (2002)
- Gray Wolf's Woman (2002)
- Force of Nature (2002)
- Christmas Feast (2003)
- The Accidental Princess (2003)
- The Mona Lucy (2003)
- Driving Me Crazy (2006)
- Flying Lessons (2006)
- Confessions of a Not-So-Dead Libido (2006)
- Late Bloomers (2007)
- Wish Come True (2007) (with Patricia Kay)
- The Secret Goddess Code (2007)

=== Omnibus ===
- Silhouette Christmas Stories, 1991 (1991) (with Phyllis Halldorson)
- Angels on Zebras / Someone to Watch Over Me / Your Place or Mine? / Show Me the Way (1998) *(with Cynthia Powel)
- Summer Surrender (2004) (with Maureen Child)
- Christmas Feast / Make-Believe Mistletoe (2004) (with Gina Wilkins)
- Like Mother, Like Daughter (But in a Good Way): Born in My Heart / Becoming My Mother / Long Distance Mother (2007) (with Jennifer Greene, Nancy Robards Thompson)
