= Sleeper (brand) =

Ukrainian fashion brand

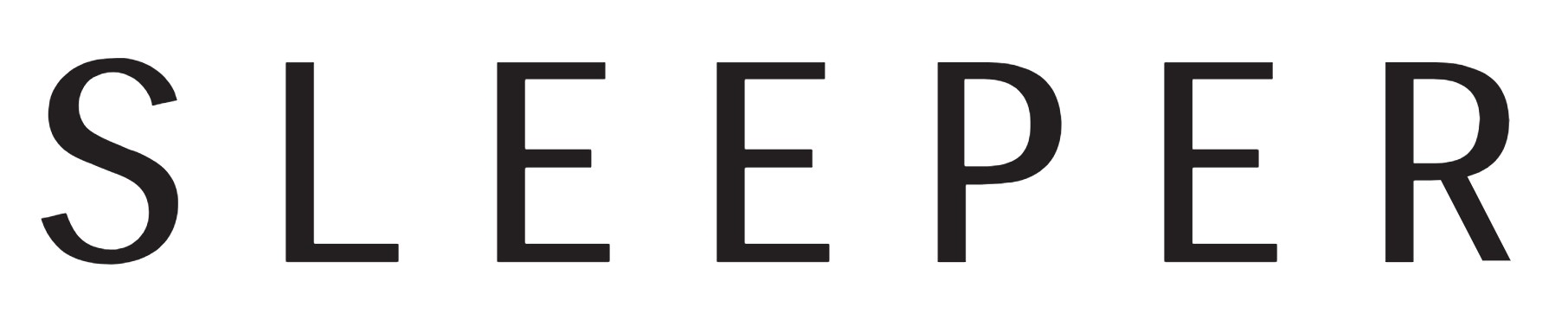
- Industry: Fashion
- Founded: 2014
- Founder: Kate Zubarieva and Asya Varetsa
- Headquarters: Kyiv, Ukraine
- Products: pajamas, dresses, loungewear, partywear, bridal collection, swimwear, shoes, bags
- Website: https://the-sleeper.com/en

Sleeper is a Ukrainian fashion brand of multifunctional apparel founded in 2014 by Kate Zubarieva and Asya Varetsa. The concept of the brand lies in the idea of the «First Walking Sleepwear» which can be worn both at home and outdoors.

== History ==
Sleeper was launched in 2014 by two former fashion editors Kate Zubarieva and Asya Varetsa.

The Sleeper first collection was launched 6 months later with the startup capital of just $2,000 and a single seamstress. In two months, then editor-in-chief of Vogue Italy, Franca Sozzani, named Sleeper the brand of the month.

In 2015, the brand put out its first line made from linen.

In 2016, Sleeper debuted its first Bridal collection which consisted of a slip dress, pajama sets with pants and loungewear dress.

In 2017, off-the-shoulder dresses became the dress of the year according to Marie Claire. The same year Sleeper released Party Pajamas as a part of the Holiday Collection’17 which soon and appeared on the covers of British versions of Cosmopolitan and Tatler.

In February 2019, Sleeper's co-founders Kate Zubarieva and Asya Varetsa were included into the European Forbes’ 30 under 30 list in the Arts & Culture category.

In 2021 brand used recycled materials in its collection for the first time. It presented the ‘Weekend Chic’ set made with recycled plastic.

== Founders ==
In 2011, Kate Zubarieva graduated from Kyiv University with an MA in International Journalism. She worked in the Information Agency, and later in media management. Since Kate was 19, she worked in Playing Fashion newspaper (2009) and later held the position of editor-in-chief of the online version of the Pink magazine (2010–2013), VDOH (2010–2013). She wrote articles on fashion and art-directed shootings for fashion publications.

Asya Varetsa graduated from The State University of Management in Moscow with an MA in marketing in 2012. In 2009 she worked for the Playing Fashion newspaper, and in 2010 she became a junior fashion editor for ELLE Russia.

== Production ==
Sleeper supports artisan manufacturing traditions and ethical consciousness. Sleeper's garments are made in Kyiv, Ukraine in the sewing studios.

In summer 2020 the brand expanded into footwear, and swimwear.

Sleeper's customers include Eva Chen, Katy Perry, Brie Larson, Kourtney Kardashian, Aurora James, Kelly Lynch, Busy Philipps, Chloë Grace Moretz, Zoey Deutch, Dakota and Elle Fanning, Veronika Heilbrunner, and Lena Dunham amongst others.

=== Global presence ===
As of 2021, Sleeper's collections are available in 32 markets, and more than 160 boutiques around the world. Sleeper's collections are sold at Net-a-Porter, Saks Fifth Avenue, Harvey Nichols, Shopbop, Bloomingdale's, Nordstrom, Harrods, Browns, Neiman Marcus, Ounass.

=== Charity projects ===
Under charity initiatives, Sleeper provides support to NGO Happy Today which helps children with autism, charity fund Kvitna that supports women with breast cancer.

Since 2020, the brand has donated to Black Girl Ventures and NAACP LDF to support fighting for racial justice in the US and around the globe.

=== Documentary ===
In 2019, Sleeper created a documentary called “Behind the Seams” that conveys the process of creating a new collection, Sleeper's team, the office, production, and the world's largest shirt.

In 2020 Sleeper's documentary was shortlisted by Milan Fashion Film Festival. In 2021 the documentary was awarded with the Webby Honoree.
