= Lightning Novices' Chase =

Steeplechase horse race in Britain

Lightning Novices' Chase
2023
Tommy's Oscar	Boothill	Since Day One

Previous years
2022
Third Time Lucki	Do Your Job	Only two finished
2021
Shishkin	Eldorado Allen	Est Illic

2020-2011
2020
Mister Fisher	Al Dancer	Lisp
2019
Dynamite Dollars	Ballywood	Ravenhill Road
2018
Sceau Royal	Shantou Rock	Adrien Du Pont
2017
Forest Bihan	Cloudy Dream	A Hare Breath
2016
Vaniteux	Arzal	Fox Norton
2015
Three Kingdoms	Solar Impulse	Mister Spingsprong
2014
Valdez	Arnaud	Fox Appeal
2012
Kid Cassidy	Kumbeshwar	Menorah

2010-2001
2010
Woolcombe Folly	I'm Delilah	Mad Max
2009
Panjo Bere	Calgary Bay	Free World
2008
Wee Robbie	Mahogany Blaze	Orpen Wide
2007
Another Promise	Rasharrow	Mange Tout
2006
Foreman	Le Volfoni	Marcel
2005
My Will	Ashley Brook	Contraband
2004
Bal De Nuit	Non So	Mercato
2002
Il'Athou	Monkerhostin	Imaginaire
2001
Exit To Wave	Dusk Duel	Shooting Light

2000-1991
2000
Bellator	Blowing Wind	Jungli
1998
Wade Road	Hurricane Lamp	Queen Of Spades
1996
Certainly Strong	Super Coin	Fierce
1995
Gales Cavalier	Absalom's Lady	Here He Comes
1993
Valiant Boy	Kibreet	Reggae Beat
1992
Deep Sensation	Young Pokey	Icarus
1991
Uncle Ernie	Buck Willow	Xhai

1990-1988
1990
Cashew King	Young Snugfit	Only two finished
1989
Sabin Du Loir	Nos Na Gaoithe	Brookmount
1988
Saffron Lord	Neblin	Dictalino

The Lightning Novices' Chase is a Grade 2 National Hunt steeplechase in Great Britain which is open to horses aged five years or older. It is run at Windsor over a distance of about 2 miles, and during its running there are twelve fences to be jumped. The race is for novice chasers, and it is scheduled to take place each year in January.

The race was first run in 1979 and was originally held at Ascot, contested over a distance of 2 miles. It was switched to alternative venues for a three-year period beginning in 2005, and it returned to Ascot with a distance of 2 miles and 1 furlong in 2008. The race was transferred to Doncaster in 2010, and at the same time its length was cut by 110 yards. It was run in late January or early February.

In April 2023 the British Horseracing Authority announced that the race would be moved to Lingfield and would be run one week earlier as part of a restructure of the 2023/24 programme. The race was moved again to be run at Windsor from 2025 onwards and the race remains there today, forming part of the three-day Berkshire Winter Million meeting.

== Winners ==
Year	Winner	Age	Jockey	Trainer
1979	Dramatist	8	Bill Smith	Fulke Walwyn
1980	Beacon Light	9	Bob Turnell	Andy Turnell
1981	Double Bluff	8	John Francome	Fred Winter
1982	Abandoned due to snow
1983	Starfen	7	Tim Easterby (Note: amateur jockey)	Peter Easterby
1984	Norton Cross	6	Alan Brown	Peter Easterby
1985	Abandoned due to frost and snow
1986	Pearlyman	7	Paul Barton	John Edwards
1987	Abandoned due to frost and snow
1988	Saffron Lord	6	Richard Rowe	Josh Gifford
1989	Sabin du Loir	10	Peter Scudamore	Martin Pipe
1990	Cashew King	7	Trevor Wall	Bryan McMahon
1991	Uncle Ernie	6	Mark Dwyer	Jimmy FitzGerald
1992	Deep Sensation	7	Declan Murphy	Josh Gifford
1993	Valiant Boy	7	Russ Garritty	Steve Kettlewell
1994	Abandoned due to waterlogging
1995	Gales Cavalier	7	Mark Dwyer	David Gandolfo
1996	Certainly Strong	6	Adrian Maguire	David Nicholson
1997	Abandoned due to frost
1998	Wade Road	7	Jason Titley	Henrietta Knight
1999	Abandoned due to fog
2000	Bellator	7	Norman Williamson	Venetia Williams
2001	Exit to Wave	5	Norman Williamson	Paul Nicholls
2002	Il'Athou	6	Henry Oliver	Simon Sherwood
2003	Abandoned due to frost and snow
2004 (Note: The race was run at Ascot in 2004, Uttoxeter in 2005, Lingfield Park in 2006, and Huntingdon in 2007)	Bal de Nuit	5	Ruby Walsh	Paul Nicholls
2005	My Will	5	Ruby Walsh	Paul Nicholls
2006	Foreman	8	Tony McCoy	Thierry Doumen
2007	Another Promise	8	Graham Lee	Ferdy Murphy
2008	Wee Robbie	8	Noel Fehily	Nick Gifford
2009	Panjo Bere	6	Jamie Moore	Gary L. Moore
2010	Woolcombe Folly	7	Ruby Walsh	Paul Nicholls
2011	Abandoned due to frost
2012	Kid Cassidy	6	Tony McCoy	Nicky Henderson
2013	Abandoned due to frost
2014	Valdez	7	Robert Thornton	Alan King
2015	Three Kingdoms	6	Tony McCoy	John Ferguson
2016	Vaniteux	7	Nico de Boinville	Nicky Henderson
2017	Forest Bihan	6	Aidan Coleman	Brian Ellison
2018	Sceau Royal	6	Wayne Hutchinson	Alan King
2019	Dynamite Dollars	6	Harry Cobden	Paul Nicholls
2020	Mister Fisher	6	James Bowen	Nicky Henderson
2021	Shishkin	7	Nico de Boinville	Nicky Henderson
2022	Third Time Lucki	7	Harry Skelton	Dan Skelton
2023	Tommy's Oscar	8	Danny McMenamin	Ann Hamilton
2024	JPR One	7	Brendan Powell	Joe Tizzard
2025	Gidleigh Park	7	Bryan Carver	Harry Fry
2026	No Questions Asked	8	Ben Jones	Ben Pauling

== See also ==
- Horse racing in Great Britain
- List of British National Hunt races

== Sources ==
- Racing Post:
  - 1988, 1989, 1990, 1991, 1992, 1993, 1995, 1996, 1998, 2000
  - 2001, 2002, 2004, 2005, 2006, 2007, 2008, 2009, 2010, 2012
  - 2014, 2015, 2016, 2017, 2018, 2019, 2020, 2021, 2022, 2023
