= Barbara Faith =

American novelist (1921–1995)

Barbara Faith de Covarrubias
- Born: February 19, 1921; Cleveland, Ohio, America
- Died: October 10, 1995 (aged 74)
- Occupation: Novelist
- Spouse: Alfonso Covarrubias (m. 1970; her death 1995)
- Writing career
- Pen name: Barbara Faith
- Period: 1978–95
- Genre: Romance
- Notable work: The Sun Dancers
- Notable awards: Golden Medallion – Mainstream Contemporary Romance; 1982 The Sun Dancers

Barbara Faith de Covarrubias (February 19, 1921 – October 10, 1995), was an American writer of more than 40 romance novels as Barbara Faith (her maiden name) from 1978 until the day of her death. Her book, The Sun Dancers, received a Golden Medallion from Romance Writers of America in 1982.

== Biography ==
Barbara Faith was born on February 19, 1921, in Cleveland, Ohio. She married former bullfighter Alfonso Covarrubias on November 11, 1970. They renewed their vows in Spain on May 6, 1983. She began work as a public relations person in Miami, Florida and later moved to Chula Vista, California. She later moved to San Miguel de Allende in Mexico.

She published her first novel in 1978 for Silhouette Books. Most of her books are set in Mexico, Spain, United States or Morocco, and many of the male protagonists of her books are Hispanic.

== Awards ==
- 1982 - Romance Writers of America Golden Medallion, Mainstream Contemporary Romance – The Sun Dancers

== Bibliography ==
=== Single novels ===
- Kill Me Gently Darling (1978)
- Choices of the Heart (1980)
- The Moonkissed (1980)
- The Sun Dancers (1981)
- Enchanted Dawn (1982)
- The Promise of Summer (1983)
- Wind Whispers (1984)
- Awake to Splendor (1985)
- Islands in Turquoise (1985)
- Tomorrow Is Forever (1986)
- Sing Me a Lovesong (1986)
- Return to Summer (1986)
- Kiss of the Dragon (1987)
- Asking for Trouble (1987)
- Say Hello Again (1988)
- Beyond Forever (1988)
- In a Rebel's Arms (1989)
- Heather on the Hill (1989)
- Capricorn Moon (1989)
- Danger in Paradise (1990)
- Lord of the Desert (1990)
- Echoes of Summer (1991)
- Mr. Macho Meets His Match (1991)
- The Matador (1992)
- Queen of Hearts (1992)
- Gamblin' Man (1992)
- This Above All (1993)
- Cloud Man (1993)
- A Silence of Dreams (1993)
- Midnight Man (1993)
- Dark, Dark My Lover's Eyes (1994)
- Moonlight Lady (1995)
- Scarlet Woman (1995)
- Long-Lost Wife? (1996)

=== Morocco's Desert Series ===
1. Bedouin Bride (1984)
2. Desert Song (1986)
3. Flower of the Desert (1988)

=== Man of the World Series (lti-Author) ===
3. Lion of the Desert (1991)

=== Romantic Traditions Series (Multi-Author) ===
- Desert Man (1994)

=== That's My Baby! Series (Multi-Author) ===
- Happy Father's Day (1996)

=== Omnibus in collaboration ===
- Summer Sizzlers 1988 (1988) (with Joan Hohl and Billie Green)
- Summer Sizzlers: Men of Summer (1996) (with Kathleen Eagle and Joan Hohl)
- Flower of the Desert + By the Sheikh's Command by Debbi Rawlins (2006)
