= Kathleen Eagle =

American novelist

- Born: Kathleen Pierson; November 8, 1947 (age 78); Virginia, U.S.
- Education: Mount Holyoke College (BA); Northern State University (MS)
- Occupation: Novelist
- Spouse: Clyde Spencer Eagle
- Children: 3
- Writing career
- Pen name: Kathleen Eagle
- Period: 1984-present
- Genre: Romance
- Notable work: This Time Forever
- Notable awards: RITA award – Single Title Contemporary Romance; 1993 This Time Forever
- Website: www.kathleeneagle.com

Kathleen Eagle (née Pierson; born November 8, 1947) is an American author of over 50 romance novels.

== Bibliography ==
=== Single novels ===
- Class Act (1985)
- Someday Soon (1985)
- Georgia Nights (1986)
- For Old Times' Sake (1986)
- Something Worth Keeping (1986)
- Carved in Stone (1987)
- Private Treaty (1988)
- Candles in the Night (1988)
- More Than a Miracle (1988)
- But That Was Yesterday (1988)
- Medicine Woman (1989)
- Heat Lightning (1989)
- Paintbox Morning (1989)
- 'Til There Was You (1989)
- Heaven and Earth (1990)
- Bad Moon Rising (1991)
- Black Tree Moon (1992)
- This Time Forever (1992)
- Diamond Willow (1993)
- Broomstick Cowboy (1993)
- Fire and Rain (1994)
- Defender (1994)
- Reason to Believe (1995)
- Surrender! (1995)
- Sunrise Song (1996)
- The Last True Cowboy (1998)
- What the Heart Knows (1999)
- Once Upon a Wedding (2002)
- Nightwolf's Captive (2003)
- A View of the River (2005)
- Ride a Painted Pony (2006)
- Mystic Horseman (2008)
- In Care Of Sam Beaudry (2009)
- One Christmas One Cowboy (2009)
- Cool Hand Hank (2010)
- Once A Father (2010)

=== American Heroes: Against All Odds Series Multi-Author ===
- To Each His Own (1992)

=== Night Remembers Series ===
1. The Night Remembers (1997)
2. Night Falls Like Silk (2003)

=== Last Good Man Series ===
1. The Last Good Man (2000)
2. You Never Can Tell (2001)

=== Collections ===
- Friends, Families, Lovers (1993)
- Summer Sizzlers '97 - Too Hot to Handle (1996)

=== Omnibus in Collaboration ===
- Silhouette Summer Sizzlers (1988) (with Barbara Faith and Joan Hohl)
- Silhouette Christmas Stories (1990) (with Annette Broadrick, Brooke Hastings and Curtiss Ann Matlock)
- Silhouette Summer Sizzlers 1991 (1991) (with Marilyn Pappano)
- Brave Hearts (1994) (with Heather Graham and Diana Palmer)
- Mistletoe Marriages (1994) (with Elaine Barbieri, Patricia Gardner Evans and Margaret Moore)
- For the Baby's Sake (1997) (with Mary Lynn Baxter and Marie Ferrarella)
- A Funny Thing Happened on the Way to the Delivery Room (1997) (with Kasey Michaels and Emilie Richards)
- A Mother's Gift (1998) (with Joan Elliott Pickart and Emilie Richards)
- Lakota Legacy (2003) (with Madeline Baker and Ruth Wind)
- Dream Catchers (1989) (with Bronwwyn Williams)

=== Non-fiction ===
- "Forget the Fluff" essay in North American Romance Writers (1999, ISBN 0810836041)

== Awards ==
- 1993 - Romance Writers of America RITA Award, Single Title Contemporary Romance – This Time Forever

== See also ==
- List of authors by name: E
- List of romantic novelists
