= Deep Sensation =

British-bred Thoroughbred racehorse

- Sire: Deep Run
- Grandsire: Pampered King
- Dam: Bannow Bay
- Damsire: Arctic Slave
- Sex: Gelding
- Foaled: 6 July 1985
- Country: United Kingdom
- Colour: Chestnut
- Breeder: Ken Oliver
- Owner: Robin Eliot
- Trainer: Josh Gifford
- Record: 49: 13-14-7
- Earnings: £356,403

Major wins
- Tote Gold Trophy (1990); Lightning Novices' Chase (1992); Nottinghamshire Novices' Chase (1992); H & T Walker Gold Cup (1992); Queen Mother Champion Chase (1993); Melling Chase (1993)

Deep Sensation (6 July 1985 – 25 November 2003) was a British Thoroughbred racehorse who competed under National Hunt rules. He ran in six consecutive Cheltenham Festivals and is best known for his win in the 1993 Queen Mother Champion Chase. In his first three seasons he was campaigned in hurdle races, recording his most notable success in the 1990 Tote Gold Trophy. When switched to larger obstacles he was one of the leading novice steeplechasers of 1991/1992, winning the Lightning Novices' Chase and the Nottinghamshire Novices' Chase. He reached his peak in the following season, when he took the H & T Walker Gold Cup, the Queen Mother Champion Chase and the Melling Chase. He never won another major race but recorded two minor wins and was placed in several important chases over the next two years. He was retired from racing after a narrow defeat in the 1995 Melling Chase after winning thirteen of his forty-nine races and being placed on twenty-one occasions. He died in November 2003 at the age of eighteen.

== Background ==
Deep Sensation was a chestnut gelding with a white star and four white feet bred by Ken Oliver. Oliver was best known as one of the most successful trainers in the history of Scottish National Hunt racing, winning the Scottish Grand National on five occasions. Deep Sensation was sired by Deep Run, an outstanding sire of jumpers whose other progeny included Dawn Run, Morley Street, Granville Again and Golden Cygnet. He was an exceptionally late foal, being born on 6 July 1985.

As a young horse, Deep Sensation was sold for 29,000 guineas at Doncaster. During his racing career the gelding was owned by Robin Eliot and trained by Josh Gifford at Findon, West Sussex. His stable nickname was "Ginger".

== Racing career ==
=== 1988/1989 season: Novice Hurdles ===
Deep Sensation began his racing career in a novice hurdle at Newbury Racecourse on 2 November 1988. Ridden by Richard Rowe who partnered the horse in most of his early race, he started at odds of 10/1 and finished third of the nineteen runners, twelve lengths behind the winner Look Lively. After finishing sixth at Sandown Park Racecourse in December he recorded his first success at the same venue on 17 February when he made most of the running and won by one and a half lengths from the favourite Chief Mole. He returned to Sandown three weeks later for a novices' handicap in which he carried a weight of 166 pounds. Starting the 5/2 favourite he took the lead at the third hurdle and won by two lengths from Nahar.

=== 1989/1990 & 1990/1991 seasons: Hurdle races ===
In the next two seasons, Deep Sensation competed in hurdle races against more experienced opponents. In November 1989 he finished fourth in a handicap for four-year-olds at Chepstow Racecourse and then ran second to Morley Street in the Sport of Kings Challenge at Cheltenham Racecourse in December, before finishing third to Atlaal and Osric in the Lanzarote Hurdle at Kempton Park Racecourse in January. On 10 February 1990 at Newbury Racecourse he started at odds of 7/1 under a weight of 157 pounds in a seventeen-runner field for the twentieth running of the Tote Gold Trophy. Racing on heavy ground he took the lead at the second hurdle and was never headed thereafter. In the closing stages he held off the sustained challenge of the Irish-trained gelding Joyful Noise to win by a head. On his first appearance at the Cheltenham Festival he started a 33/1 outsider for the Champion Hurdle on 13 March and finished ninth of the nineteen runners behind Kribensis. On his final appearance of the season he finished fifth in the Scottish Champion Hurdle in April.

On his first appearance of the 1990/1991 season, Deep Sensation won the St Mary's Trial Hurdle at Warwick Racecourse on 17 November, taking the lead soon after the start and winning by three quarters of a length from Atlaal. The gelding then started 11/4 favourite for the Grade One Christmas Hurdle at Kempton but after leading until the final hurdle he was overtaken on the run-in and finished third behind Fidway and Sybillin. In February he fell at the last when in the lead in the Agfa Hurdle at Sandown, and was then last of the four finishers when favourite the National Spirit Hurdle at Fontwell Racecourse. In the latter race he was ridden for the first time by Declan Murphy, who took over from Rowe as his regular jockey. In his second bid for the Champion Hurdle, Deep Sensation started a 50/1 outsider and finished tenth of the twenty-four runners, more than thirty lengths behind the winner Morley Street.

=== 1991/1992 season: Novice Chases ===
In the 1991/1992 season Deep Sensation competed in novice steeplechases, making his debut over the larger obstacles in a minor event at Wincanton Racecourse in November when he fell when leading at the tenth fence. He recorded his first chase win at Exeter Racecourse on 6 December beating Sabaki River by a length after the odds-on favourite Beech Road (winner of the 1989 Champion Hurdle) fell at the fourth. Three weeks later the gelding was moved up in class and started 6/4 favourite for the Wayward Lad Novices' Chase at Kempton. He was racing in third place when he was brought down by the fall of the leader Midfielder three fences from the finish in a race won by Poetic Gem.

On 10 January Deep Sensation was matched against 1991 Herald Champion Novice Hurdle winner Young Pokey in the Lightning Novices' Chase over two miles and twelve fences at Ascot Racecourse. Starting the 6/4 favourite, he tracked Young Pokey before taking the lead at the second last and defeated his rival by one and a half lengths. There was a gap of twenty-five lengths back to Icarus in third, with Poetic Gem last of the four runners. Peter Hobbs took the ride on 1 February when Deep Sensation finished second to the Nicky Henderson-trained Freeline Finishing at Chepstow, beaten a length by the winner, to whom he was conceding three pounds. Two weeks later, Murphy was back in the saddle when the gelding ran in the Grade 2 Nottinghamshire Novice's Chase at Nottingham Racecourse and started 13/8 joint favourite with Clay County, who had won his last five races including the Grade 1 Northumberland Gold Cup. After making jumping errors at the fourth and fifth fences, he took the lead at the second last and drew away in the closing stages to win by fifteen lengths. In March Deep Sensation raced for the third time at the Cheltenham Festival and started the 3/1 favourite against ten opponents in the Grade 1 Arkle Novices' Chase, but finished fourth behind Young Pokey, Tinryland and Space Fair.

=== 1992/1993 season: Steeplechases ===
When matched against more experienced chasers in the autumn of 1992, Deep Sensation was the beaten favourite in his first two races, finishing second in a handicap at Wetherby Racecourse on 30 October and second again to Freeline Finishing at Chepstow a week later. On 21 November, the gelding carried 156 pounds in the H & T Walker Gold Cup, a handicap for horses who had not won a chase before the start of the previous season, over two and a half miles at Ascot. He started at odds of 11/2 in a ten-runner field which featured many of the previous season's leading novice chase winners including Bradbury Star (Scilly Isles Novices' Chase, Mildmay Novices' Chase), Second Schedual (Woodchester Bank Gold Cup), The Illywhacker (Future Champion Novices' Chase), Cyphrate (Maghull Novices' Chase) and Beech Road. Deep Sensation was restrained by Murphy before moving up to take the lead at the last fence and won by two lengths from Danny Harrold, with Bradbury Star half a length back in third. In the Tingle Creek Trophy (then a handicap race), Deep Sensation started favourite but was beaten into second by Waterloo Boy despite receiving twenty-one pounds from the winner. When the gelding was tried over three miles for the first and only time he finished a remote fifth behind The Fellow, Pat's Jester, The Illywhacker and Bradbury Star in the King George VI Chase at Kempton on Boxing Day.

Deep Sensation returned to two miles in the early part of 1993 and finished second in his next two races. He was beaten ten lengths by the novice Sybillin in the Victor Chandler Chase at Ascot in January and then finished two and half lengths runner-up to Armaget when favourite for the Grade 2 Marston Moor Chase at Wetherby a month later. Deep Sensation made his fourth appearance at the Cheltenham Festival when he was one of nine horses to contest the Grade 1 Queen Mother Champion Chase on 17 March. Katabatic who had won the race in 1991 and finished second in 1992, started 6/5 favourite ahead of Waterloo Boy on 7/4 with Deep Sensation third choice in the betting at odds of 11/1. Declan Murphy positioned the horse towards the rear of the field as the 50/1 outsider Boro Smackeroo made the running. At the third last fence the leader began to weaken and Cyphrate gained the advantage from Fragrant Dawn with Deep Sensation moving up into third at the penultimate obstacle. After jumping the last in second, Deep Sensation overtook Cyphrate on the run-in and held off the renewed challenge of his rival to win by three-quarters of a length, with Katabatic finishing strongly to take third.

On his final appearance of the season, Deep Sensation started 7/4 joint favourite with Waterloo Boy in the Grade 1 Melling Chase over two and a half miles at Aintree Racecourse in April. The only other runners were the John Durkan Memorial Punchestown Chase winner Gold Options, who had beaten Katabatic at Haydock Park in January and the dual Ladbroke Hurdle winner Redundant Pal. Deep Sensation raced at the rear of the field, which remained closely grouped until the fourth last, when Waterloo Boy dropped away quickly and was soon pulled up (he was found to have broken a blood vessel). Redundant Pal took the lead from Gold Options approaching the penultimate fence but Deep Sensation moved up easily on the inside, took the lead at the last and drew away on the run-in to win by eight lengths.

=== 1993/1994 season: Steeplechases ===
Deep Sensation began his next season in November 1993 when he finished second to Travado in both the Haldon Gold Cup at Exeter and the Peterborough Chase at Huntingdon Racecourse. In December, he finished ahead of Travado and Waterloo Boy in the Tingle Creek Trophy, but was beaten into second place by Sybillin. He was then dropped in class for the John Bull Chase at Wincanton and won at odds of 4/9, beating Elfast and Toby Tobias. In February he finished fourth to the improving seven-year-old Viking Flagship in the Game Spirit Chase and second to Remittance Man in the Emblem Chase at Kempton. When Deep Sensation attempted to repeat his success in the Queen Mother Champion Chase at Cheltenham, he faced a strong field which included Remittance Man, Travado, Viking Flagship, Sybillin and Katabatic. He appeared to be travelling well when taking the lead at the last but was overtaken on the run-in and finished third behind Viking Flagship and Travado. Racing on heavy ground at Aintree in April he tired in the closing stages of the Melling Chase and finished a distant third behind Katabatic and Travado. On his final appearance of the season, Deep Sensation was assigned top weight of 168 pounds in the Moonshine Handicap Chase over two miles at Ascot on 26 April. After being held up as usual by Murphy in the early stages he took the lead on the run-in and won by one and quarter lengths from Spree Cross, to whom he was conceding twenty-eight pounds.

Declan Murphy's career was effectively ended when he sustained multiple skull fractures in a fall at Haydock in May 1994. Although he briefly returned to race-riding before his retirement, he never resumed his partnership with Deep Sensation.

=== 1994/1995 season: Steeplechases ===
Deep Sensation began his final season in the Haldon Gold Cup and finished a distant third behind Travado and the mare Absalom's Lady. On 11 November he carried 168 pounds in the Mitsubishi Shogun Handicap Chase over two miles at Cheltenham and started 8/11 favourite against two opponents. Ridden by Richard Dunwoody, he took the lead at the fifth fence and won by half a length from the David Nicholson-trained Wonder Man. He finished second to the seven-year-old Martha's Son (conceding nine pounds to the winner) in the Peterborough Chase, then ran third to Viking Flagship and Travado in the Tingle Creek Trophy before falling at the fourth in the Castleford Chase at Wetherby on 27 December 1994. In early 1995 at Ascot Deep Sensation was well beaten by Martha's Son in both the Victor Chandler Chase and the Comet Chase.

In his last two races, Deep Sensation was ridden by Norman Williamson. On 15 March he ran for the sixth consecutive year at the Cheltenham Festival and started a 14/1 outsider for the Queen Mother Champion Stakes. Having been held up in the early running he moved steadily forward before moving up to challenge the leader Viking Flagship at the last fence. He got to within a length of the leader on the run-in but then tired in the last 100 yards and finished second, beaten five lengths, with Nakir in third. Three weeks later, Deep Sensation faced Viking Flaghip, Martha's Son and Nakir in the Melling Chase at Aintree. Deep Sensation, Viking Flagship and Martha's Son jumped the last fence almost level, before Williamson drove Deeps Sensation up to take the advantage on the inside on the run-in. In the final strides he was overtaken by the rallying Viking Flaghship and was beaten a short-head, with Martha's Son a length away in third. After the race he had some soreness in a leg and after undergoing an operation he was retired from racing.

== Assessment ==
Josh Gifford said of the horse: "Along with Bradbury Star he would probably be the best I trained. Deep Sensation probably had more class but he was such an old pro he would keep a bit back for himself. He was a good horse on his day, but if it wasn't his day he would save it for another day". Robin Eliot called him "a cunning old pro, but the way Declan Murphy rode him – invariably travelling with a double handful – was a joy to behold". Murphy said that Deep Sensation was "a joy to ride".

== Retirement ==
Deep Sensation spent his retirement at Janine Jones' yard in West Sussex, regularly returning to Cheltenham to parade in front of the crowds before the Queen Mother Champion Chase. Jones called him "a great character, had a real presence and was a real gentleman to look after". On 25 November 2003 he slipped and fell on the hard, wet ground in his paddock and sustained a broken leg. He was euthanised on the same day.

== Pedigree ==
Pedigree of Deep Sensation (GB), chestnut gelding, 1985
Sire Deep Run (IRE) 1966	Pampered King (GB); 1954	Prince Chevalier	Prince Rose
Sire Deep Run (IRE) 1966	Pampered King (GB); 1954	Prince Chevalier	Chevalerie
Sire Deep Run (IRE) 1966	Pampered King (GB); 1954	Netherton Maid	Nearco
Sire Deep Run (IRE) 1966	Pampered King (GB); 1954	Netherton Maid	Phase
Sire Deep Run (IRE) 1966	Trial By Fire (FR); 1958	Court Martial	Fair Trial
Sire Deep Run (IRE) 1966	Trial By Fire (FR); 1958	Court Martial	Instantaneous
Sire Deep Run (IRE) 1966	Trial By Fire (FR); 1958	Mitrailleuse	Mieuxce
Sire Deep Run (IRE) 1966	Trial By Fire (FR); 1958	Mitrailleuse	French Kin
Dam Bannow Bay (GB) 1969	Arctic Slave (IRE); 1950	Arctic Star	Nearco
Dam Bannow Bay (GB) 1969	Arctic Slave (IRE); 1950	Arctic Star	Serena
Dam Bannow Bay (GB) 1969	Arctic Slave (IRE); 1950	Roman Galley	Man o'War
Dam Bannow Bay (GB) 1969	Arctic Slave (IRE); 1950	Roman Galley	Messaline
Dam Bannow Bay (GB) 1969	Honeytown (GB); 1954	Fortina	Formor
Dam Bannow Bay (GB) 1969	Honeytown (GB); 1954	Fortina	Bertina
Dam Bannow Bay (GB) 1969	Honeytown (GB); 1954	Sanvina	Sandyman
Dam Bannow Bay (GB) 1969	Honeytown (GB); 1954	Sanvina	Tovina (Family 23-a)
