= Karen Young (author) =

American novelist

- Occupation: Novelist
- Spouse: Paul
- Children: 3
- Writing career
- Pen name: Karen Young
- Period: 1983–present
- Genre: Contemporary romance
- Notable awards: RITA award – Best Long Contemporary Series Romance; 1993 The Silence of Midnight
- Website: karenyoung.net

Karen Young is an American author of over thirty contemporary romance novels.

== Biography ==
Karen Young did not always intend to be a writer. Her husband Paul became an executive in a corporation and frequently relocated to different areas of the world. For the family's fifteenth move, Young was forced to give up an interesting job in politics in the New Orleans area. To stifle her boredom, Young decided to find a more flexible career. Within four months she had finished her first story, and within six weeks of submitting the romance novel to Silhouette, the book sold.

Young describes her novels as concerning "the concept of the evolved woman—one who's able to look her personal demons in the eye and solve her problems...regardless." Her novels have dealt with difficult situations such as teen pregnancy, infidelity, and alcoholism.

To keep her ideas fresh, Young often switches genres, writing novels that are considered traditional romance, category romance, women's fiction, and suspense novels. She has been nominated three times for the Romance Writers of America RITA Award, winning in 1994. Young has also received the Romantic Times Career Achievement Award and several Romantic Times Reviewers' Choice Awards. Her novels have also appeared on the USA Today bestseller list.

Young has three daughters. She lives in Houston, Texas.

== Bibliography ==
=== O'Connor Trilogy ===
- Roses and Rain (1994)
- Shadows in the Mist (1994)
- The Promise (1994)

=== Novels ===
- Yesterday's Promise (1983)
- Irresistible Intruder (1984)
- A Wilder Passion (1985)
- Darling Detective (1986)
- The Forever Kind (1987)
- Maggie Mine (1987)
- Sarah's Choice (1988)
- All My Tomorrows (1988)
- Compelling Connection (1989)
- Debt of Love (1991)
- Beyond Summer (1991)
- The Silence of Midnight (1992)
- Puzzle me out (1993)
- Touch the Dawn (1993
- Sugar Baby (1996)
- Having His Baby (1996)
- Good Girls (1998)
- A Father's Heart (1998)
- What Child Is This? (1999)
- Full Circle (1999)
- Kiss and Kill (2000)
- Someone Knows (2002)
- Private Lives (2003)
- In Confidence (2004)
- Never Tell (2005)
- Belle Pointe (2006)

=== Omnibus ===
- My Valentine February 1994 (1994) (with Marisa Carroll, Margot Dalton, Muriel Jensen)
- Making Babies (1995) (with Pamela Browning, Sandra James)
- Heat of the Night (2000)
- Marriage for Keeps (2004) (with Margot Dalton, Gina Wilkins)

== See also ==
- List of romantic novelists
