= Gina Ferris Wilkins =

American author (born 1954)

Gina Ferris Vaughan Wilkins
- Born: Gina Ferris Vaughan; December 20, 1954 (age 71); Little Rock, Arkansas, U.S.
- Occupation: Novelist
- Spouse: John Wilkins (m. 1972)
- Children: 3
- Writing career
- Pen name: Gina Wilkins; Gina Ferris; Gina Ferris Wilkins
- Period: 1987–present
- Genre: Romance

Gina Ferris Wilkins, née Vaughan (born December 20, 1954, in Little Rock, Arkansas, United States) is an American author of over 85 romance novels. She writes novels as Gina Ferris, Gina Wilkins and Gina Ferris Wilkins.

== Biography ==
Born Gina Ferris Vaughan on December 20, 1954, in Little Rock, Arkansas, daughter of Beth Vaughan, an executive secretary, and Vernon Vaughan, an electrician. In February 1972, she married John Wilkins, a wood turner, and they have three children.

She obtained a journalism degree from Arkansas State University (ASU) and worked in advertising and human resources.

In 1987 she sold her first book to Harlequin and embarked on a career as a full-time writer. Since then, she has written more than 85 novels for various Harlequin and Silhouette category romance lines. Her early Silhouette novels were written under the pseudonyms, Gina Ferris and Gina Ferris Wilkins, which she later dropped in favor of Wilkins. Her books have been translated into twenty languages and appear in more than 100 countries.

Wilkins was awarded a Romantic Times Reviewers' Choice Award in 2003 for Best Silhouette Special Edition, Make-Believe Mistletoe and has been nominated for both a Romantic Times Reviewers' Choice Award for Best Harlequin Temptation (1998 for Tempting Tara) and a Romantic Times Career Achievement Award. The Georgia Romance Writers have awarded her the Maggie Award for Excellence four times, and Wilkins has seen her books appear on the Waldenbooks, B. Dalton, and USAToday Bestseller lists.

In 1999, Wilkins was forced to sue BET Publishing for plagiarism. A librarian who was a fan of Wilkins noticed that a new book she was reading, When Love Calls, by Gail McFarland, appeared to very closely match a Harlequin Temptation, Hotline, published in 1991 by Wilkins. After purchasing and examining the other book, Wilkins claims that over 100 pages were taken in whole or part from her work. In an out-of-court settlement reached in 2000, BET agreed to withdraw all copies of their book from booksellers and to cease any future publication of the book. Neither the publisher nor the infringing author offered an apology or admission of guilt.

Wilkins is a member of Novelists, Inc. and the Romance Writers of America, and often speaks at schools to emphasize literacy, goal-setting, and motivation.

== Bibliography ==
=== As Gina Wilkins ===
==== Single novels ====
- Partner for Life (1988)
- Stroke of Genius (1989)
- Single and Looking
- Could it be Magic (1989)
- After Hours (1990)
- Changing the Rules (1990)
- A Perfect Stranger (1991)
- Hotline (1991)
- My Valentine (1992)
- When It's Right (1993)
- Rafe's Island (1993)
- Undercover Baby (1994)
- Gold and Glitter (1994)
- I Won't! (1995)
- All I Want for Christmas (1995)
- A Night to Remember (1996)
- The Getaway Bride (1997)
- The Father Next Door (1997)
- Healing Sympathy (1998) (originally as Gina Ferris)
- In from the Rain (1999) (originally as Gina Ferris)
- The Littlest Stowaway (1999)
- The Best Man's Plan (2002)
- The Groom's Stand-in (2002)
- It Takes a Cowboy (2003)
- Make Believe Mistletoe (2003)
- Love Lessons (2006)
- Season of Dreams (2007)
- Husband for a Weekend (2012)
- Wake Me (2012)
- His Best Friend's Wife (2012)
- The Right Twin (2013)
- The Texan's Surprise Baby (2013)
- A Match for the Single Dad (2013)

==== Reed Sisters: Holding out for a Hero series ====
1. Hero in Disguise (1987)
2. Hero for the Asking (1988)
3. Hero by Nature (1988)

==== James Family series ====
1. Cause for Celebration (1988)
2. A Bright Idea (1989)
3. A Rebel at Heart (1991)

==== Veils & Vows series ====
1. Taking a Chance on Love (1992)
2. Designs on Love (1992)
3. At Long Last Love (1992)

==== Luck Brothers series ====
1. As Luck Would Have It (1993)
2. Just Her Luck (1994)

==== Arkansas Firefighters series ====
1. It Could Happen to You (1997)
2. Valentine Baby (1998)

==== Southern Scandals series ====
1. Seducing Savannah (1997)
2. Tempting Tara (1998)
3. Enticing Emily (1998)
4. The Rebels Return (1998)

==== The Wild McBrides series ====
1. Seductively Yours (2000)
2. Secretly Yours (2000)
3. Yesterday's Scandal (2000)

==== Family Found: Sons and Daughters series ====
1. Her Very Own Family (1999)
2. That First Special Kiss (1999)
3. Surprise Partners (2000)
4. Adding To The Family (2005)
5. The Borrowed Ring (2005)
6. The Road To Reunion (2006)
7. Wealth Beyond Riches (2006)
8. The Texan's Tennessee Romance (2009)

==== Hot Off the Press series ====
1. The Stranger in Room 205 (2002)
2. Bachelor Cop Finally Caught? (2001)
3. Dateline Matrimony (2001)

==== McClouds of Mississippi series ====
1. The Family Plan (2003)
2. Conflict of Interest (2003)
3. Faith, Hope and Family (2003)

==== Brannon Brothers series ====
1. The Date Next Door (2006)
2. The Bridesmaid's Gifts (2007)
3. Finding Family (2008)
4. The Man Next Door (2008)

==== Doctors in Training series ====
1. Diagnosis: Daddy (2009)
2. The Doctor's Undoing (2010)
3. Prognosis: Romance (2010)
4. Private Partners (2011)

==== Doctors in the Family series ====
1. The M.D. Next Door (2011)
2. A Home for the M.D. (2011)
3. Doctors in the Wedding (2011)

==== Bachelor Auction series multi-author ====
- It Takes a Hero (1999)

==== Merlyn County Midwives series multi-author ====
- Countdown to Baby (2004)

==== Eligible Bachelors series multi-author ====
- Doctor in Disguise (2004)

==== The Parks Empire series multi-author ====
- The Homecoming (2004)

==== Logan's Legacy series multi-author ====
- The Secret Heir (2005)

==== Nascar series multi-author ====
- Almost Famous (2007)
- Hearts Under Caution (2007)
- A NASCAR Holiday 2 (omnibus) (2007) (with Pamela Britton, Ken Casper and Abby Gaines)

==== Collections ====
- Holding Out for a Hero (1999)
- Once a Family...: Full of Grace / Hardworking Man (2005) (originally as Gina Ferris)

==== Omnibus in collaboration ====
- Matched By Mistake (1996) (with Penny Jordan and Carole Mortimer)
- Valentine Delights (1997) (with Kate Hoffmann and Meryl Sawyer)
- Written in the Stars (2001) (with Judith Arnold and Kate Hoffmann)
- Heat of the Night (2002) (with Lori Foster and Vicki Lewis Thompson)
- Marriage for Keeps (2004) (with Margot Dalton and Karen Young)
- Christmas Feast / Make-Believe Mistletoe (2004) (with Peggy Webb)
- Secret Heir / Newlyweds (2005) (with Elizabeth Bevarly)
- Intimate Surrender / The Secret Heir (2005) (with RaeAnne Thayne)
- Adding to the Family / Pregnancy Project (2005) (with Victoria Pade)
- Borrowed Ring / Where There's Smoke (2005) (with Kristin Hardy)
- Protectors in Blue (2006) (with Rachel Lee)

=== As Gina Ferris ===
==== Single novels ====
- Healing Sympathy (1988)
- Lady Beware (1989)
- In from the Rain (1991)
- Prodigal Father (1991)
- Babies on Board (1994)

==== Family Found series ====
1. Full of Grace (1993)
2. Hardworking Man (1993)
3. Fair and Wise (1993)
4. Far to Go (1993)
5. Loving and Giving (1994)

=== As Gina Ferris Wilkins ===
==== A Family Way Series ====
1. A Man for Mum (1995)
2. A Match for Celia (1995)
3. A Home for Adam (1995)
4. Cody's Fiancee (1995)

==== Gates-Cameron series ====
1. A Valentine Wish (1996)
2. A Wish for Love (1996)

==== Omnibus in collaboration ====
- Three Mothers And a Cradle: Rock-a-bye Baby, Cradle Song, Beginnings (1996) (with Jill Marie Landis and Debbie Macomber)
