= The Sleepers (Chicago band) =

American rock band formed in 2002

- Origin: Chicago, Illinois, U.S.
- Genres: Rock and roll, blues rock, southern rock
- Years active: 2002–present
- Labels: Rocksauce Records & Pravda Records
- Members: Tommy Richied; Tony Manno; Kevin Bannon; Chris Cormier; Johnny Action
- Past members: Anthony Maietta (drums); Jeremiah Zelaskiewicz (bass)
- Website: Official website

The Sleepers are an American rock band from Chicago, Illinois.

== Biography ==
This band formed in 2002, where they performed their first concert at Brixie's in Brookfield, Illinois. Since then they have played at venues throughout the Midwest and West Coast, performing their own music as well as occasional cover songs.

In the Summer of 2005, The Sleepers recorded their debut album, Push It Nationwide, with Jim Diamond at Ghetto Recorders in Detroit, Michigan. Jim Diamond is a veteran music producer, studio engineer, and bass player based in Detroit, Michigan. As proprietor and chief engineer at Ghetto Recorders, Diamond has worked with several well-known indie rock performers, including The Dirtbombs, The Fleshtones, Electric Six, The Witches, Bantam Rooster, The Come Ons, The Volebeats, The Gore Gore Girls, The Mooney Suzuki, The Compulsive Gamblers, The Dirtys, The Ponys, The Volebeats, The Go, Outrageous Cherry, Paik, The Clone Defects, They Come In Threes, The Sights, The White Stripes, and The Hentchmen.

The Sleepers signed a record deal with Pravda Records in Chicago and released their sophomore record Comeback Special on February 26, 2008.

The band played their last show in September 2015. Kevin Bannon, Johnny Action and Tony Manno have formed a new band called Budokan77.

== Television and film ==
- The show Reaper on The CW Television Network used the song "Dirty Cop" in the Season 1 finale episode "Cancun."
- The television sitcom Love Monkey on VH1 starring Jason Priestley used the song "Don't Let Me In" in an episode.
- MTV has used the song "Jet Set Trash" (Push It Nationwide) for its show entitled "Rob and Big", as well as the song "Last Cowboy" (Push It Nationwide) for the most recent season of The Real World.
- The television sitcom The Bad Girls Club has used the songs "Bad For Me" and "Jet Set Trash" (Push It Nationwide) in recent episodes.
- The song "Loaded" is featured on the soundtrack to a YouTube fan film sequel entitled "JC's Halloween II" (not the Rob Zombie film).

== Discography ==
- 2008 - Comeback Special (Worldwide: Pravda Records)
- 2005 - Push It Nationwide (USA: Rocksauce Records)
- 2004 - self-titled EP (Independent)
