= Linda Winstead Jones =

American author

- Occupation: Novelist
- Writing career
- Pen name: Linda Jones, Linda Fallon, and Linda Devlin
- Genre: Romance
- Notable work: Shades of Midnight
- Notable awards: RITA award – Paranormal Romance; 2004 Shades of Midnight
- Website: www.lindawinsteadjones.com

Linda Winstead Jones is an American author who has written more than fifty romance books in several subgenres, including paranormal romance, historical romance, fairy tale romance, and romantic suspense. Jones has published many of her novels under various pseudonyms including Linda Jones, Linda Fallon, and Linda Devlin.

== Bibliography ==
=== Series ===
==== Sinclair Connection ====
1. Madigan's Wife (2001)
2. Hot on His Trail (2001)
3. Capturing Cleo (2002)
4. In Bed with Boone (2002)
5. Wilder Days (2003)
6. Clint's Wild Ride (2003)
7. On Dean's Watch (2003)

==== Last Chance Heroes ====
1. Running Scared (2004)
2. Truly, Madly, Dangerously (2005)
3. One Major Distraction (2005)
4. Lucky's Woman (2006)
5. The Guardian (2006)

=== Stories of Columbyana ===
==== Fyne sisters ====
1. The Sun Witch (2004)
2. The Moon Witch (2005)
3. The Star Witch (2006)

==== Children of the Sun ====
1. Prince of Magic (2007)
2. Prince of Fire (2007)
3. Prince of Swords (2007)

==== Emperor's Bride ====
1. Untouchable (2008)
2. 22 Nights (2008)
3. Bride By Command (2009)

=== Novels ===
- Every Little Thing (2000)
- West Wind (2004)
- Omnibus
- Christmas Spirit (1997) (with Elaine Fox, Leigh Greenwood)
- Love Is Murder (2003) (with Rebecca Brandewyne, Maureen Child)
- Fever / Billionaire Drifter (2004) (with Beverly Bird)
- One Major Distraction / Melting Point (2005) (with Debra Cowan)
- Beyond the Dark (2005) (with Evelyn Vaughn, Karen Whiddon)
- In His Bed (2007) (with Barbara McCauley)
- Guardian / Black Sheep P.I. (2008) (with Karen Whiddon)
- Romancing the Crown (2008) (with Marie Ferrarella)
- Sweet Dreams in The Magical Christmas Cat (2008) (with Lora Leigh, Erin McCarthy, Nalini Singh) and Paranormal Holiday Anthology Trio (2010)

=== Series contributed to ===
- Men in Blue
- Bridger's Last Stand (1999)
- Romancing the Crown
- Secret-agent Sheikh (2002)
- Romancing the Crown
- Secret-agent Sheikh (2002)
- Family Secrets
- Fever (2004)
- Family Secrets : The Next Generation
- A Touch of the Beast (2004)
- Capturing the Crown
- The Sheikh and I (2006)
- Raintree
- Raintree: Haunted (2007)
- Raintree (omnibus) (2008) (with Beverly Barton, Linda Howard)

== Awards and reception ==
- 2004 - Romance Writers of America RITA Award, Paranormal Romance – Shades of Midnight

Jones's September 1996 time-travel novel, Desperado's Gold was the winner of the Colorado Award of Excellence in the paranormal division. She was nominated for a Romantic Times Career Achievement Award for Innovative Historical Romance, and her book Someone's Been Sleeping In My Bed was nominated in their Best Historical Love and Laughter category for 1996. She has won the Colorado Romance Writers Award of Excellence twice, is a three time RITA Award finalist.

== Sources ==
- Fantastic Fiction. 2009. Fantastic Fiction. 7 February 2009
- Alabama Bound. 2004. Alabama Bound. 2100 Park Place, Birmingham, Alabama, 35203-2974. 7 February 2009.
- Linda Jones. 1998– 2009. Fictionwise.com, Ereader.com. 7 February 2009.
- Linda Winstead Jones.2008 Penguin Group USA. 7 February 2009.
- Meet Linda Jones. Historical Romance Writers. 2001–2009. Tara and Siren Productions. 7 February 2009.
