= Jennifer Greene =

American writer

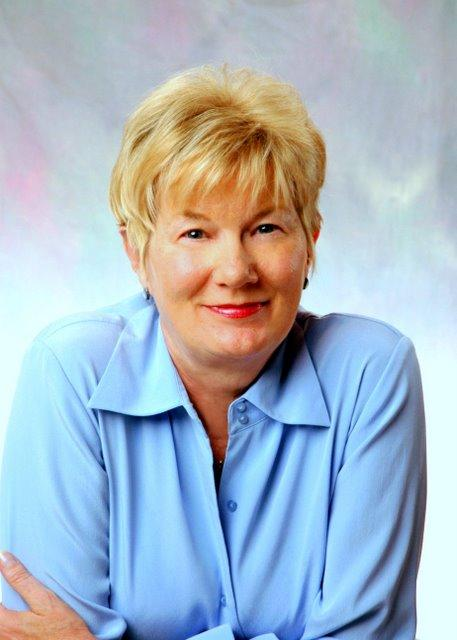
- Jill Alison Hart, better known as Jennifer Greene
- Born: Jill Alison Hart; Michigan, United States
- Education: Michigan State University
- Occupation: Novelist
- Spouse: L.J. Culby
- Writing career
- Pen name: Jennifer Greene; Jeanne Grant; Jessica Massey
- Period: 1980–present
- Genres: Romantic novel Suspense
- Notable works: Night of the Hunter, Single Dad, Nobody's Princess, Born in My Heart in Like Mother, Like Daughter
- Notable awards: RITA award – Short Contemporary Series Romance; 1990 Night of the Hunter RITA award – Short Contemporary Series Romance; 1996 Single Dad; RITA award – Short Contemporary Series Romance; 1998 Nobody's Princess RITA award – Romance Novella; 2008 Born in My Heart in Like Mother, Like Daughter
- Website: www.jennifergreene.com

Jennifer Greene is one of the pseudonyms for Jill Alison Hart (born in Michigan, United States). She is a writer of over 85 romance novels since 1980. She has also written novels as Jeanne Grant and Jessica Massey, and uses the name Alison Hart as a business name for her writing.

She has been honored with many awards. In the summer of 1998 she was inducted into the Romance Writers of America's Hall of Fame, and later received the Nora Roberts Lifetime Achievement Award.

== Biography ==
Greene obtained a degree in English and in Psychology from the Michigan State University. At Michigan State she was honored with the Lantern Night Award (which MSU traditionally gives to 50 outstanding women graduates). She sold her first book in 1980 under the pen name Jessica Massey, and from 1983 to 1987 published under the pseudonym Jeanne Grant. Since 1986 she has used the pseudonym Jennifer Greene. In addition to writing Greene has worked as a teacher, counselor, and personal manager. She is married and lives in the country near Benton Harbor, Michigan.

== Bibliography ==
=== As Jennifer Greene ===
==== Category romances ====
- Yours, Mine and Ours (Silhouette Special Edition, 2011)
- Billionaire's Handler (Silhouette Special Edition, 2010)
- Hot to the Touch (Silhouette Desire, 2005)
- Millionaire M.D. (Silhouette Desire, 2001)
- Rock Solid (Silhouette Desire, 2000)
- Her Holiday Secret (Silhouette Desire, 1998)
- A Baby in his In-Box (Silhouette Desire, 1998)
- Nobody’s Princess (Silhouette Desire, 1997) - RWA Rita Winner
- Single Dad (Silhouette Desire, 1995) - RWA Rita Winner
- Arizona Heat (Silhouette Desire, 1995)
- A Groom for Red Riding Hood (Silhouette Desire, 1994)
- Quicksand (Silhouette Desire, 1993) - RWA Rita Finalist
- Just Like Old Times (Silhouette Desire, 1992)
- Night Light (Silhouette Desire, 1991)
- Falconer (Silhouette Desire, 1991)
- Slow Dance (Silhouette Desire, 1990)
- Heat Wave (Silhouette Desire, 1990)
- Broken Blossom (Silhouette Intimate Moments, 1990)
- Night of the Hunter (Silhouette Desire, 1989) - RWA Rita Winner
- Devil’s Night (Silhouette Intimate Moments, 1989) - RWA Rita Finalist
- Dancing in the Dark (Silhouette Desire, 1989)
- Secrets (Silhouette Intimate Moments, 1988) - RWA Rita Finalist
- The Castle Keep (Silhouette Desire, 1988)
- Love Potion (Silhouette Desire, 1988)
- Lady of the Island (Silhouette Desire, 1988)
- Minx (Silhouette Desire, 1987)
- Dear Reader (Silhouette Desire, 1987)
- Lady Be Good (Silhouette Desire, 1987)
- Madam’s Room (Silhouette Desire, 1987)
- Foolish Pleasure (Silhouette Desire, 1986)
- Body and Soul (Silhouette Desire, 1986)

==== Single titles ====
- Blame it on Paris (HQN, 2008)
- Blame it on Cupid (HQN, 2007) - RWA Rita Winner
- Blame it on Chocolate (HQN, 2006)
- Sparkle (Harlequin, 2006)
- Lucky (Harlequin, 2005)
- Where is he Now? (Avon, 2003)
- The Woman Most Likely To… (Avon, 2002)

==== Series books ====
===== New Man in Town Series =====
- Mesmerizing Stranger (Silhouette Romantic Suspense, 2010)
- Irresistible Stranger (Silhouette Romantic Suspense, 2010)
- Secretive Stranger (Silhouette Romantic Suspense, 2010)

===== Lavender Series =====
- Wild in the Moment (Silhouette Desire, 2004)
- Wild in the Moonlight (Silhouette Desire, 2004)
- Wild in the Field (Silhouette Desire, 2003)

===== Royal Charming Happily Ever After Series =====
- Kiss Your Prince Charming (Silhouette Desire, 2000)
- Prince Charming’s Child (Silhouette Desire, 1999)

===== Stanford Sisters Series =====
- Bachelor Mom (Silhouette Desire, 1997)
- The 200% Wife (Silhouette Special Edition, 1997)
- The Unwilling Bride (Silhouette Desire, 1996)

===== Jock’s Boys Series =====
- Bewitched (Silhouette Desire, 1994)
- Bothered (Silhouette Desire, 1994)
- Bewildered (Silhouette Desire, 1994)

===== Shepard Brothers Series =====
- It Had To Be You (Silhouette Desire, 1992)
- Pink Topaz (Silhouette Intimate Moments, 1992)

===== Special Series =====
- The Soon-To-Be-Disinherited Wife (Silhouette Desire “Secret Lives of Society Wives” series, 2006)
- Isabelle / Diana / Suzanna (2004) (with Christine Rimmer and Cheryl St. John)
- Montana Weddings (2001) (with Christine Rimmer and Cheryl St. John)
- You Belong To Me (Silhouette Desire “Montana Mavericks: Big Sky Brides Series, 2000) (with Christine Rimmer and Cheryl St. John)
- The Honor-Bound Groom (Silhouette “Fortune’s Children Series”, 1998)
- The Baby Chase (Silhouette “Fortune’s Children Series”, 1997)

==== Novellas ====
- Blame it on the Blizzard (Silhouette “Baby It’s Cold Outside” anthology, 2010)
- Kokomo (Harlequin “Summer Dreams” anthology, 2007)
- Born in my Heart (Harlequin “Like Mother, Like Daughter” anthology, 2007) - RWA Rita Winner
- Twelfth Night (Silhouette “Santa’s Little Helpers’ anthology, 1995)
- The Christmas House (Silhouette “Gifts of Fortune” anthology, 2001)
- Riley’s Baby (Silhouette “Birds, Bees and Babies” anthology, 1990)

=== As Jeanne Grant ===
==== Category romances ====
- Tender Loving Care (1987)
- No More Mr. Nice Guy (1986)
- Sweets to the Sweet (1986)
- Pink Satin (1985)
- Can’t Say No (1985)
- Ain’t Misbehaving (1985) - RWA Rita Finalist
- Silver and Spice (1984) - RWA Rita Finalist
- Conquer the Memories (1984)
- Cupid’s Confederates (1984)
- Trouble in Paradise (1984)
- Wintergreen (1984)
- Sunburst (1984)
- Kisses from Heaven (1984)
- A Daring Proposition (1983)
- Man from Tennessee (1983)

=== As Jessica Massey ===
==== Single books ====
- Stormy Surrender (1984)

=== As Alison Hart ===
- "The Key Formula in Romance: A Woman’s Quest" essay in North American Romance Writers (1999, ISBN 0810836041)

== Awards ==
- 1984 RWA Silver Medallion Winner, Silver and Spice
- 1985 Romantic Times, Best Sensual Series Author Winner
- 1986 RWA, Golden Medallion Finalist, Ain't Misbehaven
- 1987 Affaire de Coeur, Silver Certificate Winner, No More Mr. Nice Guy
- 1988–1989 Romantic Times Lifetime Achievement Award Winner
- 1989 RWA Golden Medallion Finalist, Secrets
- 1989 Romantic Times, Best Series Romance Author Winner
- 1989 Affaire de Coeur, Silver Certificate Winner, Night of the Hunter
- 1990 - Romance Writers of America RITA Award, Short Contemporary Series Romance – Night of the Hunter
- 1990 RWA Golden Medallion Finalist, Devil's Night
- 1991 RWA RITA Finalist, Broken Blossom, 1991
- 1991–1992 Romantic Times, Reviewers Choice in Series Romantic Suspense Winner - PINK TOPAZ
- 1991–1992 Romantic Times Career Achievement Award Winner - Series Romantic Adventure
- 1994 RWA RITA Finalist, Quicksand
- 1996 - Romance Writers of America RITA Award, Short Contemporary Series Romance – Single Dad
- 1998 - Romance Writers of America RITA Award, Short Contemporary Series Romance – Nobody's Princess
- 1998 RWA Hall of Fame
- 1998 Romantic Times, Career Achievement Award Winner - Storyteller of the Year
- 2008 - Romance Writers of America RITA Award, Romance Novella – Born in My Heart in Like Mother, Like Daughter
- 2009 Nora Roberts Lifetime Achievement Award
