= Joan Elliott Pickart =

American writer (??–2018)

- Born: United States
- Died: November 13, 2018
- Occupation: Novelist
- Writing career
- Pen name: Robin Elliott
- Period: 1984–2006
- Genre: Romance

Joan Elliott Pickart (died November 13, 2018) was an American writer of over 100 romance novels, who also wrote under the pen name Robin Elliott.

== Biography ==
Pickart was one of three daughters of Robert G. Elliott, an Episcopal pastor in Detroit, Michigan and Douglas, Arizona. She graduated from Douglas High School before attending Arizona State University. In 1982, she was employed as a secretary at Amphitheater High School, Tucson, Arizona, when she began writing romance novels after taking a course at Pima Community College. Her first published novel, Breaking All the Rules, was bought by Bantam Books in winter 1983-84 for their Loveswept range, and appeared in summer 1984. Pickart then became a full-time writer, with Bantam immediately buying six more of her novels. By late 1985, a reviewer wrote that Pickart was "fast becoming one of Loveswept's most consistent and popular authors [who] brings an extra dimension of humanity to the characters she creates ... [In Midnight Ryder she] employs humor and honest emotion to keep readers involved. ... Pickart's sensual writing is ... all the more romantic for being understated." In Waiting for Prince Charming, she used "many original touches [in] a modern rendering of an old fairy tale".

Elliott was the co-founder of the Professional Writers of Prescott, a member of the national Romance Writers of America, the Phoenix Desert Rose Chapter of RWA, and a charter member and co-president of the Northern Arizona RWA.

Elliott was a single mother of four daughters. She lived in Prescott, Arizona.

== Awards ==
- 1985: Best New Series Author of the Year from Romantic Times Magazine
- Outstanding Achievement and Certificate of Recognition for Notable Attainment as an Author from the Society of Southwestern Writers
- Two-time award finalist of Golden Medallion (RITA) of the Romance Writers of America

== Bibliography ==
Her works can be categorised as follows:

=== As Joan Elliott Pickart ===
==== Single novels ====
- Breaking All the Rules (1984)
- Fascination (1985)
- The Finishing Touch (1985)
- Look for the Sea Gulls (1985)
- All the Tomorrows (1985)
- The Shadowless Day (1985)
- Midnight Ryder (1985)
- Rainbow's Angel (1985)
- Sunlight's Promise (1985)
- Waiting for Prince Charming (1985)
- The Eagle Catcher (1986)
- Secrets of Autumn (1986)
- Listen for the Drummer (1986)
- Mr Lonelyhearts (1986)
- Illusions (1987)
- Leprechaun (1987)
- Wild Poppies (1987)
- Lucky Penny (1987)
- Reforming Freddy (1987)
- January in July (1988)
- Serenity Cove (1988)
- To First Be Friends (1989)
- Holly's Hope (1989)
- The Magic of the Moon (1989)
- The Bonnie Blue (1990)
- Storming the Castle (1990)
- Mixed Signals (1990)
- To Love and to Cherish (1990)
- From This Day Forward (1991)
- Whispered Wishes (1991)
- Preston Harper, MD (1991)
- The Devil in Stone (1991)
- Memories (1991)
- Irresistible (1992)
- Night Magic (1992)
- Angels Singing (1993)
- Amber, Sing Softly (1994)
- Apache Dream Bride (1996)
- A Little Christmas Cookbook (1997)
- Just My Joe (1999)
- Gauntlet Run (1999)
- Man... Mercenary... Monarch (2001)
- Single with Twins (2002)
- The Parker Project (2004)
- Texas Baby: Texas Love Stories (2004)
- The Hero Returns (2006)

==== The Baby Bet: MacAllister's Gifts Series ====
1. Angels and Elves (1995)
2. Friends, Lovers... and Babies! (1996)
3. The Father of Her Child (1996)
4. To a MacAllister Born (2000)
5. His Secret Son (2000)
6. Baby, MacAllister-made (2000)
7. Her Little Secret (2001)
8. Party of Three (2001)
9. Plain Jane MacAllister (2002)
10. The Royal MacAllister (2003)
11. Tall, Dark and Irresistible (2003)
12. The Marrying Macallister (2003)
13. Accidental Family (2004)
14. Macallister's Return (2005)
15. A Bride By Christmas (2005)
16. Home Again (2005)

MacAllister's Wager (Omnibus) (2002)
Marriage MacAllister Style (Omnibus) (2005)

==== Texas Family Men Series ====
1. Texas Dawn (1997)
2. Texas Glory (1997)
3. Texas Moon (1997)
4. Texas Baby (1997)

==== Montana Mavericks Series Multi-Author ====
- Wife Most Wanted (1998)

==== Follow that Baby Series Multi-Author ====
- The Rancher and the Amnesiac Bride (1999)

==== Bachelor Bet Series ====
1. The Irresistible Mr. Sinclair (1999)
2. Taming Tall, Dark Brandon (2000)
3. The Most Eligible MD (2000)

==== Royally Wed Series Multi-Author ====
- Man... Mercenary... Monarch (2001)

==== Most Likely to... Series Multi-Author ====
- The Homecoming Hero Returns (2005)

==== Willow Valley Women Series ====
- A Wedding in Willow Valley (2006)

==== Omnibus In Collaboration ====
- A Mother's Gift (1998) (with Kathleen Eagle and Emilie Richards)
- Baby Love (1999) (with Victoria Pade)
- His Secret Life (2000) (with B.J. James)
- Crowned Hearts (2001) (with Diana Palmer and Linda Turner)
- Body of Evidence (2003) (with Justine Davis and Jackie Merritt)
- Best Friends and Lovers (2006) (with Sherryl Woods)
- For the Twins (2006) (with Maureen Child)
- For Their Child's Sake (2006) (with Suzanne Brockmann)

=== As Robin Elliott ===
==== Single novels ====
- Brookes Chance (1986)
- Picture of Love (1986)
- Pennies in the Fountain (1986)
- Betting Man (1987)
- Dawn's Gift (1987)
- Silver Sands (1987)
- Out of the Cold (1988)
- Sophie's Attic (1992)
- Not Just Another Perfect Wife (1993)
- Haven's Call (1994)
- Mother at Heart (1995)
