= Sleeper (surname) =

Sleeper is a surname. Notable people with the surname include:

- Albert Sleeper (1862–1934), American politician from Michigan
- Charles Sleeper (1856–1924), American physician and politician from Maine
- David L. Sleeper (1856–1914), American politician from Ohio
- Henry Davis Sleeper (1878–1934), American antiquarian, collector, and decorator
- Jim Sleeper (born c. 1947), American author and journalist
- John Sherburne Sleeper (1794–1878), Massachusetts sailor, novelist, journalist, and politician
- Josiah Sleeper (18??–1946), American businessman in Pennsylvania, founder of Sleeper's College
- Martha Sleeper (1910–1983), film and Broadway actress
- Samantha Sleeper (born c. 1987), fashion designer
- Thomas Sleeper (1956–2022), American composer
- William True Sleeper (1819-1904), Congregationalist clergyman, educator, poet, and hymn-writer.
