= Margot Dalton =

American novelist

Margot Dalton is a pseudonym used by Phyllis Strobell to write contemporary romance novels.

Dalton has been nominated for a Romantic Times Career Achievement Award and for a Romantic Times Reviewers' Choice Award for Fourth Horseman. Her novel Another Woman was developed into a made-for-TV movie in 1994, starring Justine Bateman.

== Bibliography ==
=== Novels ===
- Magic and Moonbeams (1990)
- Sagebrush and Sunshine (1990)
- Under Prairie Skies (1990)
- Ask Me Anything (1991)
- Three Waifs and a Daddy (1991)
- Sunflower (1992)
- Daniel and the Lion (1992)
- Juniper (1992)
- Tumbleweed (1992)
- Another Woman (1993)
- Angels in the Light (1993)
- Kim and the Cowboy (1994)
- Southern Nights (1994)
- The Heart Won't Lie (1994)
- Mustang Heart (1994)
- Never Givin' Up on Love (1994)
- Man of My Dreams (1995)
- The Secret Years (1995)
- A Family Likeness (1996)
- Tangled Lives (1996)
- Memories of You (1997)
- First Impression (1997)
- Second Thoughts (1998)
- Third Choice (1998)
- Fourth Horseman (1999)
- Consequences (2000)
- Even the Nights Are Better (2000)
- New Way to Fly (2000)

=== Omnibus ===
- My Valentine February 1994 (1994) (with Marisa Carroll, Muriel Jensen and Karen Young)
- New Year's Resolution: Baby (1996) (with JoAnn Ross and Anne Stuart)
- Christmas Delivery (1997) (with Margaret St. George and Dallas Schulze)
- Marriage for Keeps (2004) (with Gina Wilkins and Karen Young)
