= Kylie Brant =

American author

Kylie Brant is an American author of contemporary romantic suspense and thriller novels.

Brant claims she began writing in 1990 because her favorite authors couldn't write fast enough to keep her in reading material. She submitted her finished manuscript to Silhouette Books in New York City, but it was her second novel, McLain's Law that became her first sale in 1992. A few months later the publisher purchased her first manuscript as well.

A three-time RITA nominee, Brant's work has garnered five Romantic Times nominations, and was awarded their Career Achievement award. She is the 2004 and 2009 recipient of the overall Daphne du Maurier award for excellence in mystery and suspense writing. One of her books, Undercover Bride is included on Romantic Times' All-Time Favorites list.

== Bibliography ==
- McLain's Law (1993)
- Rancher's Choice (1994)
- An Irresistible Man (1995)
- Guarding Raine (1996)
- Bringing Benjy Home (1997)
- Friday's Child (1998)
- Undercover Lover (1998)
- Heartbreak Ranch (1999)
- Falling Hard and Fast (1999)
- Undercover Bride (2000)
- Hard to Handle (2001)
- Hard to Resist (2001)
- Hard to Tame (2002)
- Alias Smith and Jones (2003)
- Entrapment (2003)
- Truth and Lies (2003)
- In Sight of the Enemy (2004)
- Dangerous Deception (2004)
- Close to the Edge (2005)
- The Business of Strangers (2005)
- The Last Warrior (2006)
- Terms of Surrender (2008)
- Terms of Engagement (2009)
- Terms of Attraction (2009)
- Waking Nightmare (2009)
- Waking Evil (2009)
- Waking the Dead (2009)
- Deadly Intent (2010)
- Deadly Dreams (2011)
- Deadly Sins (2011)
- Chasing Evil (2013)
- Touching Evil (2013)
- Facing Evil (2014)
- 11 (2014)
- Secrets of the Dead (2015)
- What the Dead Know (2015)
- Deep as the Dead (2017)
- Pretty Girls Dancing (2017)
- Cold Dark Places (2018)
- Down the Darkest Road (2019)
- A Darker Truth (2020)
