= World of the Lupi =

The World of the Lupi is an urban fantasy series by author Eileen Wilks. It is also known as the Moon Children series.

The third book in the series, Tempting Danger, was nominated for the 2004 Romantic Times Reviewers' Choice Award in the category contemporary paranormal romance. Mortal Danger was nominated for the 2005 Romantic Times Best Werewolf Romance Novel.

== Novels in this series ==
1. Only Human (Lover Beware anthology) - July 2003
2. Originally Human (Cravings anthology) - July 2004
3. Tempting Danger - October 5, 2004
4. Mortal Danger - November 1, 2005
5. Blood Lines - January 2007
6. InHuman (On the Prowl anthology) - August 2007
7. Night Season - January 2, 2008
8. Mortal Sins - February 3, 2009
9. Blood Magic - February, 2010
10. Blood Challenge (January 2011)
11. Death Magic (November 2011)
12. Mortal ties (October 2012)
13. Ritual Magic (September 2013)
14. Unbinding (October 2014)
15. Mind Magic (November 2015)
16. Dragon Spawn (2016)
17. Dragon Blood (2018)
