= Robin Eliot =

English cricketer and racing horse owner

Personal information
- Full name: Robin Francis Eliot
- Born: 7 March 1942; Gloucester, Gloucestershire, England
- Died: 10 February 2017 (aged 74); Crowborough, Sussex, England
- Batting: Left-handed
- Bowling: Left-arm medium

Domestic team information
- Years: Team
- 1961: Oxford University

Career statistics
Competition	First-class
Matches	2
Runs scored	55
Batting average	27.50
100s/50s	–/–
Top score	30
Balls bowled	306
Wickets	1
Bowling average	140.00
5 wickets in innings	–
10 wickets in match	–
Best bowling	1/70
Catches/stumpings	–/–
- Source: Cricinfo, 22 June 2019

Robin Francis Eliot (7 March 1942 – 10 February 2017) was an English first-class cricketer and racing horse owner.

Eliot was born at Gloucester in March 1942. He was educated at Radley College, before going up to Lincoln College, Oxford. While studying at Oxford he made two appearances in first-class cricket in 1961. The first came for Oxford University against Leicestershire at Oxford, while the second came for L. C. Stevens' XI against Cambridge University at Eastbourne. After graduating from Oxford, he joined Lloyd's of London as an aviation underwriter, before running his own company from 1977–94. He had a keen interest in horse racing, owning National Hunt horses, including Deep Sensation which won the Queen Mother Champion Chase in 1993. He died in February 2017.
