= Shelly Bell =

American entrepreneur

Omi Bell
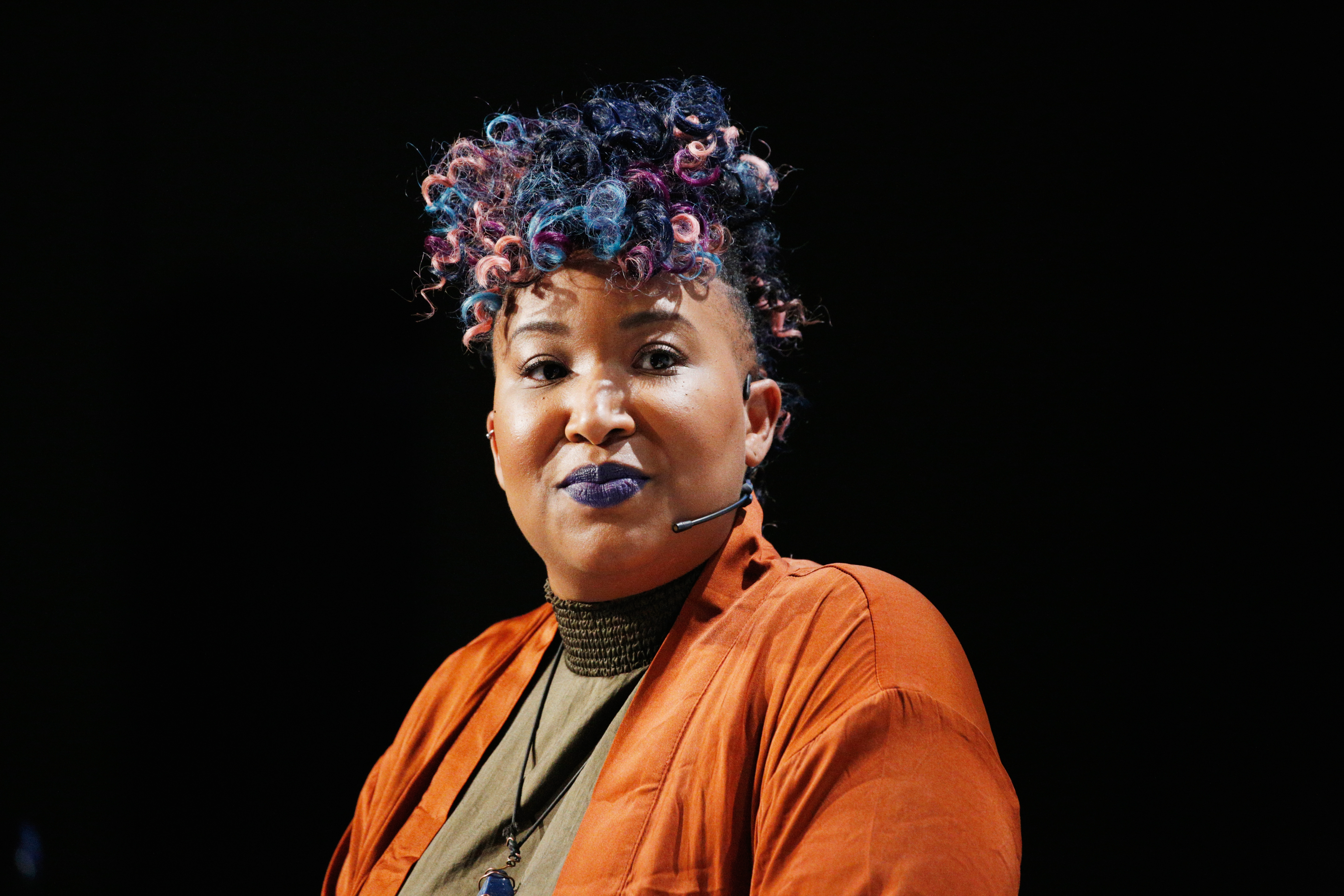
- Bell speaks onstage during TechCrunch Disrupt SF 2018 at Moscone Center, San Francisco, California.
- Born: Shelly Omílàdé Bell; Durham, North Carolina
- Other names: Omi
- Education: B.S. in Computer Science
- Alma mater: North Carolina Agricultural and Technical State University
- Years active: c.2014—present

Shelly Omílàdé Bell (known as Omi Bell) is an American entrepreneur and startup ecosystem builder. She is the founder and CEO of the social enterprise "Black Girl Ventures".

== Early life ==
Bell was born in Durham, North Carolina. After receiving a BS in computer science from North Carolina Agricultural and Technical State University, Bell began her career as a K-12 teacher.

== Career ==
Bell founded MsPrint USA, a women-run custom clothes and merchandise print shop, who served clients like Amazon and Google.

She also hosted poetry performances and led a community-based arts organization called Seven City Art Society, which evolved into Made By a Black Woman, a marketplace offering clothing, accessories, and home décor created and curated by women of color.

In 2016, Bell founded Black Girl Vision, which started as a meetup group of 30 women before Bell rebranded the organization as Black Girl Ventures. Bell aimed to connect women founders of color to peers, investors, advisors, and mentors, while garnering support and resources from corporations and local government. She cited lack of visibility and opportunities for Black women founders as one of her primary motivations for launching Black Girl Ventures. The organization runs an annual pitch competition. Its funding sources include crowdfunding, the Knight Foundation, the Kauffman Foundation, and Google.

== Personal life ==
Bell is based in Washington, D.C.

She is bisexual. As an advocate for the LGBTQIA community, she is committed to creating inclusive spaces for people of all gender identities and sexual orientations.
