= Eileen Wilks =

American novelist

- Born: November 3, 1952 (age 73); Monahans, Texas, U.S.
- Occupation: Novelist
- Writing career
- Period: 1996–present
- Genres: Romance urban fantasy paranormal romance
- Website: www.eileenwilks.com

Eileen Wilks (born November 3, 1952) is an American fiction writer living in Midland, Texas.

== Biography ==
Eileen Wilks moved from West Texas to the town of Norman, Oklahoma in the summer of 2012, and has previously lived in Canada and Venezuela, as well as twelve U.S. cities in five states.

Wilks' first book, a Silhouette Desire titled The Loner and the Lady (1996), hit the USA Today Bestseller List at #146 on May 30, 1996 and was nominated for the 1996 Romantic Times Best First Short Contemporary award. Since then, she hit the New York Times Bestsellers list with her novel Blood Challenge (2011) in her current series, World of the Lupi, in which werewolves and magic exist in an earth much like our own.

== Bibliography ==
=== Series ===
- Dynasties: The Ashtons (including Entangled)
- Dynasties: The Barons (including With Private Eyes)
- Dynasties: The Connellys (including Expecting...and in Danger)
- Just A Little Bit (including Just a Little Bit Pregnant, Just a Little Bit Married)
- At Midnight (including Midnight Cinderella, Midnight Promises, Midnight Choices, and Meeting at Midnight)
- Tall, Dark & Eligible (including Jacob's Proposal, Luke's Promise, Michael's Temptation)
- World of the Lupi (see article below for list)

=== Lupi titles (in reading order) ===
0.1 The New Kid free short story (September 2013)
0.2 Only Human in the Lover Beware anthology (July 2003) ISBN 978-0425189054
1 Tempting Danger (October 2004) ISBN 978-0425198780
1.1 Originally Human in the Cravings anthology (July 2004) ISBN 978-0515138153, ISBN (e-book): 978-1101578568
2 Mortal Danger (November 2005) ISBN 978-0425202906
2.1 Brownies deleted scene from Blood Lines (January 2007)
3 Blood Lines (January 2007) ISBN 978-0425213445
3.1 Inhuman in the On the Prowl anthology (August 2007) ISBN 978-0425216590, ISBN (e-book): 978-1101578582
4 Night Season (January 2008) ISBN 978-0425220153
4.2 Good Counsel deleted scene from Night Season (January 2008) ISBN N/A
4.5 Cyncerely Yours free short story (January 2008) ISBN N/A
5 Mortal Sins (February 2009) ISBN 978-0425225523
5.1 Human Nature in the Inked anthology (January 2010) ISBN 978-0425231975
6 Blood Magic (February 2010) ISBN 978-0425233054
7 Blood Challenge (January 2011) ISBN 978-0425239193
8 Death Magic (November 2011) ISBN 978-0425245125
8.1 Human Error in the Tied with a Bow anthology (November 2011) ISBN 978-0425243299
9 Mortal Ties (October 2012) ISBN 978-0425254929
10 Ritual Magic (September 2013) ISBN 978-0425263365
11 Unbinding (October 2014) ISBN 978-1101599976
12 Mind Magic (November 2015) ISBN 978-0425263877
13 Dragon Spawn (December 2016) ISBN 978-0451488039
14 Dragon Blood (January 2, 2018)

All referenced free or bonus stories are available on the author's website.

=== Romance titles ===
- Entangled (Silhouette Desire #1627, 01/05) ISBN 9780373766277
- Meeting at Midnight (Silhouette Desire #1605, 09/04) ISBN 9780373766055
- With Private Eyes (Silhouette Desire #1543, 11/03) ISBN 9780373765430
- A Matter of Duty (in the Broken Silence anthology, 05/03) ISBN 9780373218110
- Midnight Choices (Silhouette Intimate Moments #1210, 03/03) ISBN 9780373272808
- Expecting...and in Danger (Silhouette Desire #1472, 11/02) ISBN 9780373764723
- Her Lord Protector (Silhouette Intimate Moments #1160, 07/02) ISBN 9780373272303
- Michael's Temptation (Silhouette Desire #1409, 12/01) ISBN 9780373764099
- Luke's Promise (Silhouette Desire #1403, 11/01) ISBN 9780373764037
- Jacob's Proposal (Silhouette Desire #1397, 10/01) ISBN 9780373763979
- The Pregnant Heiress (Silhouette Desire #1378, 07/01) ISBN 9780373763788
- "The Proper Lover" (in the All I Want for Christmas anthology, 11/00) ISBN 9780312976804
- Night of No Return (Silhouette Intimate Moments #1028, 10/00) ISBN 9780373270989
- Midnight Promises (Silhouette Intimate Moments #982, 01/00) ISBN 9780373079827
- Proposition: Marriage (Silhouette Desire #1239, 09/99) ISBN 9780373762392
- Pandora's Bottle (in the Charmed anthology, 08/99) ISBN 9780425171295
- Midnight Cinderella (Silhouette Intimate Moments #921, 04/99) ISBN 9780373079216
- A Tempting Offer (in the To Tame a Texan anthology, 03/99) ISBN 9780312968861
- Just a Little Bit Married (Silhouette Desire, 12/98) ISBN 9780373761883
- Simple Sins (in the Rough Around the Edges anthology, 06/98) ISBN 9780312965990
- The Virgin and the Outlaw (Silhouette Intimate Moments, 05/98) ISBN 9780373046799
- Just a Little Bit Pregnant (Silhouette Desire #1134, 03/98) ISBN 9780373761340
- Cowboys Do It Best (Silhouette Desire #1109, 11/97) ISBN 9780373761098
- The Wrong Wife (Silhouette Desire #1065, 04/97) ISBN 9780373760084
- The Loner and the Lady (Silhouette Desire #1008, 06/96) ISBN 9780373760084
