= Cheryl St. John =

American novelist

- Occupation: Novelist
- Writing career
- Period: 1994–present
- Genre: Romance
- Website: www.cherylstjohn.net

Cheryl St. John is an American author of romance fiction, located in Omaha, Nebraska.

== Biography ==
Cheryl St. John is a romance author primarily known for her books through Harlequin and Silhouette. Rain Shadow, her first book, was nominated for the Romance Writers of America’s RITA Award, Romantic Times Best Western Historical, and Affaire de Coeur's Best American Historical Romance.

In 2005 St. John's novel His Secondhand Wife earned another RITA Award nomination. Many of St.John's Special Editions have made Waldenbooks Top Ten. Land of Dreams, The Magnificent Seven, and Prairie Wife have won Romantic Times's Reviewers Choice Awards. Her anthology, Big Sky Brides, reached #35 on The New York Times list.

== Works ==
=== Novels ===
Cowboy Creek Christmas Want Ad Wedding Sequins and Spurs Her Montana Man Her Colorado Man Marrying the Preacher's Daughter

- The Preacher's Wife, Love Inspired Historical, 2009
- The Preacher's Daughter, Harlequin Historical, June 2007
- The Lawman's Bride, Harlequin Historical, February 2007
- The Bounty Hunter, Harlequin Historical, September 2005
- His Secondhand Wife, Harlequin Historical, July 2005
- Million-Dollar Makeover, Silhouette Montana Mavericks, June 2005
- Prairie Wife, Harlequin Historical, February 2005
- Child of Her Heart, Silhouette Logan's Legacy, December 2004
- The Tenderfoot Bride, Harlequin Historical, November 2003
- Marry Me...Again, Silhouette Montana Mavericks, August 2003
- Nick All Night, Silhouette Special Edition, June 2002
- The Gunslinger's Bride, Harlequin Historical Montana Mavericks, September 2001
- The Magnificent Seven, Silhouette Montana Mavericks, March 2001
- Sweet Annie, Harlequin Historical, February 2001
- The Doctor's Wife, Harlequin Historical, October 1999
- Joe's Wife, Harlequin Historical, April 1999
- For This Week I Thee Wed, Harlequin Duets, July 1999
- The Mistaken Widow, Harlequin Historical, September 1998
- The Truth About Toby, Silhouette Special Edition, September 1997
- A Husband By Any Other Name, Silhouette Special Edition, December 1996
- Badlands Bride, Harlequin Historical, July 1996
- Saint or Sinner, Harlequin Historical, October 1995
- Land of Dreams, Harlequin Historical, April 1995
- Heaven Can Wait, Harlequin Historical, October 1994
- Rain Shadow, Harlequin Historical, March 1994

=== Novellas ===
- "A Baby Blue Christmas" in The Magic Of Christmas, Harlequin Historical, 2008
- "A Family For Christmas" in A Western Winter Wonderland, Harlequin Historical, 2007
- "Almost A Bride" in Wed Under Western Skies, Harlequin Historical, 2006
- "Colorado Wife" in Christmas Gold, Harlequin Historical, 2002
- "Isabelle" in Big Sky Brides, Harlequin Historical, 2000

=== Series/related titles ===
==== Neubauer Brothers in Pennsylvania ====
- Heaven Can Wait
- Rain Shadow

==== Harvey Girls in Newton, Kansas ====
- The Doctor's Wife
- The Tenderfoot Bride
- The Lawman's Bride

==== Copper Creek, Colorado ====
- Sweet Annie
- His Secondhand Wife
- "Almost A Bride" in Wed Under Western Skies
