= Racism in the romance fiction industry =

Racism in the romance fiction industry is a recognized issue that has received scholarly attention since the 1980s. Romance novels featuring protagonists of color were not published before 1969 in the United States and did not become part of the mainstream romance fiction industry before 1980. Romance novels featuring Black protagonists were marketed differently and, as of 2021, have been frequently shelved in segregated sections. Black novelists have felt unwelcome in industry organizations and industry awards are not regularly accorded to their work.

== History of multicultural romance fiction ==
The romance fiction industry is a major fiction genre; in the US in 2020 it represented nearly 20 percent of fiction sales. Editors and other decision makers in the romance fiction industry, as in the publishing industry in general, have historically been "overwhelmingly" white, and as of 2019 the industry was still much whiter than the US population. Brit Bennett wrote in 2017, "The average book will pass through a white agent, a white editor, a white publicist, a white sales team, a white cover artist, and white booksellers. And this process is considered natural and objective." According to the Pew Research Center, college-educated Black women are the most-likely demographic to read books. Vivian Stephens, the Black woman who founded the Romance Writers of America (RWA), is credited with creating the "ethnic romance" sometime before 1980, according to The New York Times.

Mainstream romance publishers did not publish a romance with Black protagonists until 1984, and thereafter only in race-specific imprints until 1992 when Terry McMillan's Waiting to Exhale became a bestseller and demonstrated to the publishing industry that stories about Black people could be popular among general audiences. In 2016 The Ripped Bodice, a romance bookstore in Los Angeles, began an annual audit of diversity in the industry. In 2016, 8 percent of romances were written by people of color. In 2017 6 percent were written by people of color, and in 2019 8 percent were written by people of color.

In 2019–2020, following a series of racially charged events, the entire board and executive director of RWA resigned in what Vox Media called a "spectacular public meltdown".

== Experiences of Black writers in the romance fiction industry ==
When first breaking into the romance novel industry, many Black women were placed in a creative box. Many authors working with major publishing companies, such as Beverly Jenkins and Alyssa Cole, recall being told to write Black love stories in a specific way. Not only were authors limited to the type of characters, period, and setting, but they also competed in an industry saturated with stories about white women protagonists. With these limitations, Black women romance writers moved toward self-publishing. Authors such as Christina C. Jones and Alexandria House described themselves as "proselytizer[s] of Black love" and focus their books on "black love and positivity surrounding black women and men."

Black authors described being assumed to be "aspiring"—that is, as yet unpublished—by editors they met at conferences.

In 2016 author P. J. Dean described incidents in which Black writers were rejected by publishers who decided to give the project to a white writer who "knows how to pen a black character"; Dean argued that "the publishing industry has one view how a black character should be written, and that a white writer delivers that best."

=== Within industry organizations ===
Black writers and other writers of color have reported feeling unwelcome in or excluded from writers' organizations such as RWA. As of 2019 a former RWA president reported receiving letters of complaint that books by "white Christian women" were being pushed aside because of political correctness in the industry.

=== Awards and recognition ===
No Black author has ever won a RITA, the RWA's top award for romances. As of 2018 fewer than 1 in 200 finalists for the award had been written by authors of color.

In 2017, Black author Alyssa Cole's acclaimed interracial historical romance An Extraordinary Union was one of the most reviewed romances of the year. The novel, which won other awards and was included on multiple major best-of lists, was passed over by RWA's RITA nominating process and was not included among the finalists for the award. The finalists that year were all books by White authors. In 2019 the 80 finalists included 3 authors of color. Two Black authors, Kennedy Ryan and M. Malone, won that year.

In 2020 the RITA award was renamed the Vivian after Black RWA founder Vivian Stephens, the Dell editor who created the Candlelight Ecstasy imprint and was an early champion of Black romance authors. Stephens first published Rosalind Welles, Sandra Kitt, and Beverly Jenkins.

All About Romance, an influential review site, released their 2018 list of best books of the year with no books by an author of color on the list. When the site after criticism made additions to the list, it confused Brenda Jackson and Beverly Jenkins, two prominent Black romance authors.

== Depictions of Black women in romance novels ==
Authors of color have complained about certain industry conventions, such as describing nipples as "pink", no matter the race of the woman, when most women of color have nipples that are some shade of brown.

=== Commonalities ===
Black women romance novelists, both published and non-published, seek to highlight Black love stories that celebrate joy and beauty instead of Black trauma and struggle, and avoid characters based on negative stereotypes. The protagonists stray from the definition of the perfect woman. Romance novels follow the structure of the meeting of the main character and love interest, falling in love, fighting through a conflict, and living happily.

== Marketing of romances with Black protagonists ==
Until the 1980s few romances featuring protagonists of color were published by mainstream romance publishers. for many decades, romance novels featuring Black women did not feature images of the protagonists on the cover but instead used images of the setting. In 1984 the first romance by a Black American author, Sandra Kitt, with Black protagonists, Adam and Eva, was published by Harlequin, and there was concern about including it in the subscription set which delivered four books a month by mail to subscribers' homes. The company received four letters of complaint, and the book has since been reprinted.

Some publishers create imprints specifically for romances with protagonists of color. Harlequin, the largest publisher of romance novels worldwide, published an imprint called Kimani Press from 2006 to 2017 with Black heroines (heroes could be of any ethnicity or race). Black authors' feelings about such imprints were mixed; some felt that such imprints allowed readers looking for titles with Black heroines an easy way to find such titles, but others felt race-specific imprints discouraged White readers from discovering their books. Some Kimani authors alleged that Harlequin had given less promotional support to the line than to other lines.

Romance novels with Black protagonists have been and in some stores continue to be shelved separately from other romance novels, instead being segregated in separate sections with other unrelated works by Black writers. In 2019 a reporter discussed visiting a Raleigh, North Carolina Walmart which had a romances by Black authors and featuring Black characters shelved in an area labelled as "African-American" alongside a self-help book by filmmaker Tyler Perry, the autobiography of rapper Gucci Mane, and street lit novels.

== Acceptance by white readers ==
Authors of color have described being told by white readers that they felt they wouldn't be able to relate to a heroine of color; well-known Black author Beverly Jenkins responded with "You can relate to shapeshifters, you can relate to vampires, you can relate to werewolves, but you can’t relate to a story written by and about black Americans?" Authors have pointed out that white readers accept the concept of "25 dukes running around London" but question whether a Black woman at the time of the American Civil War would understand the usage of a particular word.

== Experiences for other persons of color ==
Many authors of color have found it difficult to break into the industry. Writers have reported publishers offering to accept submissions if the author would change the characters' ethnicities.

In 2019, Courtney Milan, an RWA board member of Chinese-American descent, was expelled from the organization after she accused Kathryn Lynn Davis of "perpetuating racist stereotypes of Chinese women" in her 1999 novel Somewhere Lies the Moon, which had been scheduled to be reprinted. A backlash led to fallout in the organization, with the entire board and the executive director resigning. The organization held a special election to elect a new board and in April 2020 the organization issued an apology.

== Notable early novels ==
- Marilyn Morgan RN series by Rubie Saunders (1969–1971)
- Entwined Destinies by Rosalind Welles (1980)
- Adam and Eva by Sandra Kitt (1985)

== Notable lines ==
- Arabesque
- Kimani Press

== See also ==
- Representation of African Americans in media
