= Donna Hill =

American writer

- Hill in 2009
- Born: Brooklyn, New York
- Education: MFA in Creative Writing
- Alma mater: Goddard College
- Occupation: Novelist
- Writing career
- Pen name: Olivia Hill
- Years active: 1987–present
- Genres: Young Adult Fiction, Romance, Mystery, Women's Fiction
- Notable works: Intimate Betrayal, Masquerade, A Private Affair
- Website: donnahillwrites.com

Donna Hill is an American author of romance, mystery, and women's fiction. She has written over seventy novels, twenty short stories, and edited multiple anthologies. Three of Hill's novels (Intimate Betrayal, Masquerade, A Private Affair) have been adapted for screen.

== Personal life ==
Hill cites the works of Bernice McFadden, Jesmyn Ward, Walter Mosley, James Patterson, Jeffery Deaver, Margaret Johnson-Hodge, and Patricia Cornwell's early work as some of her inspirations.

Hill is an editor of novels, and two award-winning anthologies. She is also a writing instructor at The Frederick Douglass Creative Arts Center in New York. Hill holds an MFA in creative writing from Goddard College and is an assistant professor of English at Medgar Evers College, Essex County College and the College of New Rochelle.

== Career ==
Donna Hill began her career writing novels in 1987, writing True Confessions, and has since published more than seventy novels and received the RT Career Achievement Award for her books.

In 2009 she launched the e-book venture InnerVision Publishing together with author Pittershawn Palmer, with the intention of focusing on multicultural books.

== Selected works ==
Hill's first romance novel, Rooms of the Heart, was published by Odyssey Books in 1990.

Her sixth novel, Intimate Betrayal, is about Reese, who has lived with repressed-memoria amnesia ever since she lost her parents violently. Her memory gets triggered when she meets Maxwell and learns that their fathers were colleagues working for military intelligence. It was published by Harlequin Kimani Arabesque in 1997. Intimate Betrayal was adapted for screen as a TV movie for the BET network, starring Monica Calhoun, Khalil Kain, and Erica Gimpel in 1999.

She is also published under the pen name Olivia Hill.

== Bibliography ==
=== As Donna Hill ===
Romance

Scandalous Series

1. Scandalous (Harlequin Presents, 1995)
2. A Scandalous Affair (Harlequin, 2000)

Quinten Parker Series

1. A Private Affair (Harlequin, 1998)
2. Pieces of Dreams (Harlequin, 1999)
3. Through the Fire (Harlequin Kimani Arabesque, 2001

The Ladies Cartel Series

1. Sex and Lies (Harlequin, 2007)
2. Seduction and Lies (Harlequin, 2008)
3. Temptation and Lies (Harlequin, 2009)
4. Longing and Lies (Harlequin, 2009)

Pause for Men Series

1. Saving All My Lovin' (Harlequin Kimani, 2006)
2. Love Becomes Her (Harlequin Kimani, 2006)
3. If I Were Your Woman (Harlequin Kimani, 2007)
4. After Dark (Harlequin Kimani, 2007)

Lawsons of Louisiana Series

1. Spend My Life With You (Harlequin Kimani, 2011)
2. Secret Attraction (Harlequin Kimani, 2012)
3. Sultry Nights (Harlequin Kimani, 2012)
4. Everything is You (Harlequin Kimani, 2012)
5. The Way You Love Me (Harlequin Kimani, 2015)
6. For the Love of You (Harlequin Kimani, 2016)
7. Surrender to Me (Harlequin Kimani, 2017)
8. When I'm With You (Harlequin Kimani, 2018)

Sag Harbor Village Series

1. Touch Me Now (Harlequin Kimani Arabesque, 2012)
2. For You I Will (Harlequin Kimani Arabesque, 2014)
3. My Love at Last (Harlequin Kimani Arabesque, 2015)
- Rooms of the Heart (Genesis Press, 1990)
- Indiscretions (Genesis Press, 1991)
- Temptation (Harlequin, 1994)
- Deception (Harlequin Kimani Arabesque, 1998)
- Intimate Betrayal (Harlequin Kimani Arabesque, 1997)
- Charade (Kensington, 1998)
- Dark Rider (Harlequin Kimani Arabesque, 1999) (co-authored with Shirley Hailstock and Francis Ray)
- Interlude (Genesis Press, 1999)
- Soul to Soul (Genesis Press, 2000)
- If I Could (Kensington, 2000)
- Say Yes (Kensington, 2004)
- Rockin' Around That Christmas Tree: A Holiday Novel (St. Martin's Paperbacks, 2004) (co-authored with Francis Ray)
- Dare to Dream (Harlequin, 2004)
- Moments Like This (Harlequin, 2007)
- Chances Are (Harlequin Kimani, 2008)
- Prize of a Lifetime (Harlequin Kimani, 2009)
- Heart's Reward (Harlequin Kimani, 2010)
- Private Lessons (Harlequin Kimani, 2011)
- Legacy of Love (Harlequin Kimani 2011)
- Long Distance Lover (Mills Boon Kimani Arabesque, 2013)
- Prize of a Lifetime (Mills Boon Kimani Romance, 2013)
- Pieces of Dreams (Mills Boon Kimani Romance, 2013)
- Through the Fire (Mills Boon Kimani Romance, 2013)
- Dare to Dream (Mills Boon Kimani Romance, 2013)
- Legacy of Love (Mills Boon Kimani Romance, 2013)
- Double the Pleasure (Hilltop Publications, 2014)
- Dangerous Intentions (Hilltop Publications, 2014)
- Justin & Bailey: Director's Cut—The Untold Story (Hilltop Publications, 2015)
- Secrets of the A-List (Episode 3 of 12) (Harlequin Special Releases, 2017)
- Confessions in B Flat (Sideways, 2020)

Mystery

Tess McDonald Series

1. Getting Hers (St. Martin's Press, 2006)
2. Wicked Ways (St. Martin's Press, 2007)
- Guilty Pleasures (St. Martin's Press, 2006)
- A House Divided (Dafina, 2017)

Women's Fiction

- Rhythms (St. Martin's Griffin, 2001)
- An Ordinary Woman (St. Martin's Griffin, 2002)
- In My Bedroom (St. Martin's Press, 2004)
- Divas, Inc. (St. Martin's Griffin, 2004)
- Quiet Storm (Genesis Press, 2007)
- What Mother Never Told Me (Harlequin Kimani, 2010)
- All Up In The Mix (Sable Romance, 2018)

Anthologies

Romance

- Spirit of the Season (Harlequin Kimani Arabesque, 1994) (with stories by Margie Walker and Francis Ray)
- Love Letters (Harlequin Kimani Arabesque, 1997) (with stories by Rochelle Alers and Janice Sims)
- Rosie's Curl And Weave (St. Martin's, 1999) (with stories by Rochelle Alers and Felicia Mason)
- Della's House of Style (St. Martin's, 2000) (with stories by Rochelle Alers and Felicia Mason)
- Welcome to Leo's (St. Martin's, 2000) (with stories by Rochelle Alers, Brenda Jackson, and Francis Ray)
- Going to the Chapel (St. Martin's, 2001) (with stories by Rochelle Alers and Gwynne Forster)
- Living Large (Signet, 2003) (with stories by Rochelle Alers, Brenda Jackson, and Francis Ray)
- Lets Get It On (St. Martin's Griffin, 2004) (with stories by Rochelle Alers, Brenda Jackson, and Francis Ray)
- Dark Thirst (Gallery Books, 2004) (with stories by Omar Tyree, Angela C. Allen, Monica Jackson, Kevin S. Brockenbrough, and Linda Addison)
- Sister, Sister (St. Martin's Paperbacks, 2001)
- A Whole Lotta Love (Signet, 2004) (with stories by Francis Ray, Brenda Jackson, and Monica Jackson)
- Big Girls Don't Cry (Signet Eclipse, 2005) (with stories by Brenda Jackson, Monica Jackson, and Francis Ray)
- Destiny's Daughters (Kensington, 2006) (with stories by Gwynne Forster and Parry A. Brown)
- Creepin' (Kimani, 2007) (with stories by Monica Jackson, J.M. Jeffries, Janice Sims, and L.A. Banks)
- One the Line (Kimani Press, 2008)
- Midnight Clear (Genesis Press, 2009) (with stories by Leslie Esdaile, Gwynne Forster, Carmen Green, and Monica Jackson)
- Midnight Clear, Too (Genesis Press, 2009) (with stories by Leslie Esdaile, Carmen Green, Monica Jackson)
- After Midnight (Amazon, 2011)
- Holiday Fantasy (Harlequin Kimani 2011) (with stories by Adrienne Byrd and Kayla Perrin)
- Heat Wave (Dafina, 2011) (with stories by Niobia Bryant and Zuri Day)
- The One That I Want (Dafina, 2014)
- Della's House of Style (St. Martin's Paperbacks, 2015)
- Holiday Temptation (Dafina, 2016) (with stories by Farrah Rochon and K.M. Jackson)

Mystery

- Approaching Footsteps (Spider Road Press, 2016) (with stories by Patricia Flaherty Pagan, Jennifer Leeper, Rita Banerjee, Megan Steusloff, and Holly Walrath)

=== As Olivia Hill ===
Mystery

- Murder in the Aisles (Samhain Publishing, 2015)

== Filmography ==
Film	Year	Director	Screenwriter	Ref(s)
Intimate Betrayal	1999	Dianah Winter	Chuck Cummings	
Masquerade	2000	Roy Campanella II.	Janine Sherman	
A Private Affair	2000	Michael Toshiyuki Uno	Tony Lee	
