= Rochelle Alers =

American writer of romance novels

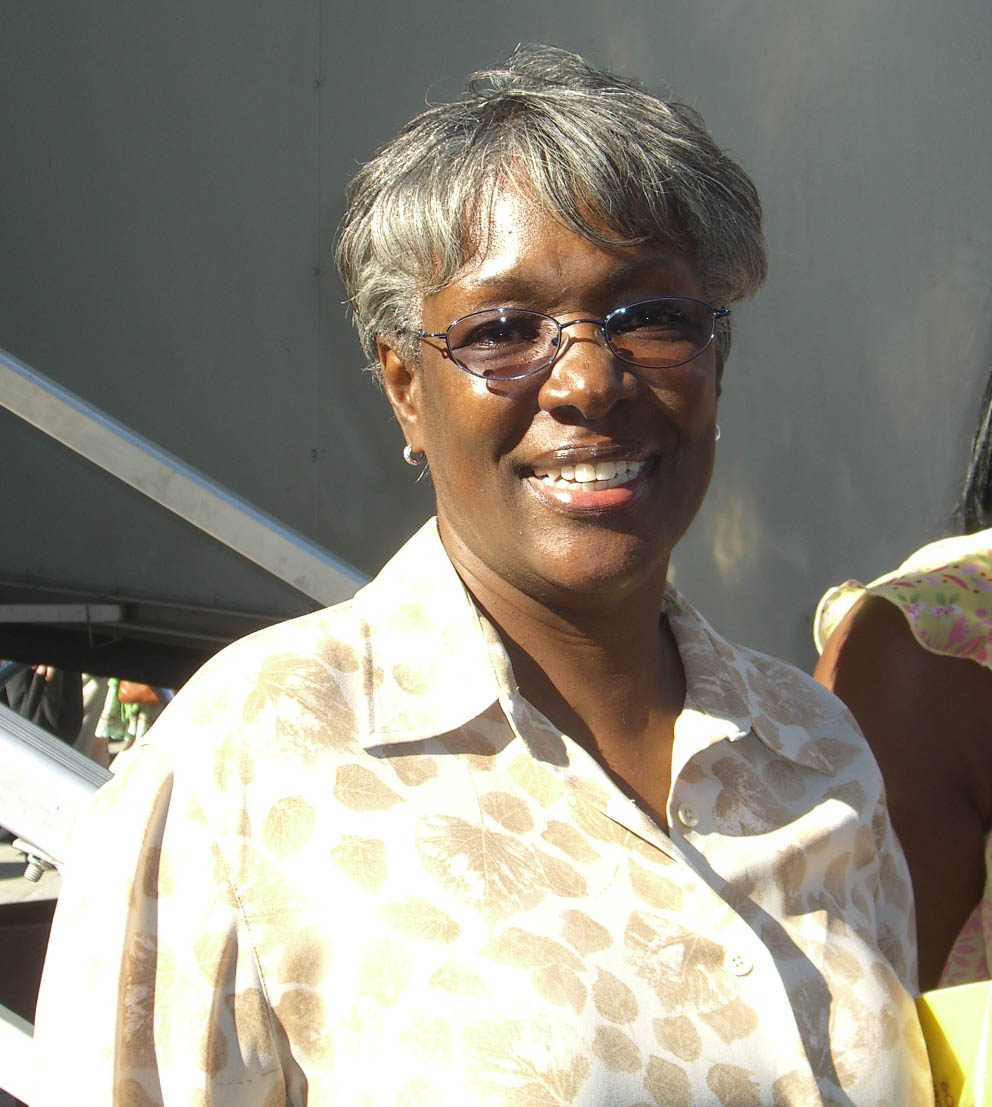
- Alers at the 2009 Brooklyn Book Festival
- Born: August 7, 1943 (age 83); New York City, U.S.
- Occupation: Novelist
- Writing career
- Pen name: Susan James; Rena McLeary
- Period: 1988–present
- Genre: romance
- Website: www.rochellealers.org

Rochelle Alers (born August 7, 1943) is an American writer of romance novels. She has also written under the pen names Susan James and Rena McLeary.

== Biography ==
Rochelle Alers was born on August 7, 1943, in Manhattan, New York, where she was also raised. After earning degrees in sociology and psychology, she taught pre-school for a time before entering the business world.

Alers began writing her first novel in 1984, after a decade of reading romance novels. She finished her first manuscript, the novel Hideway, in 1985. After several rejections because her work did not fit the formula of a category romance novel, Alers perfected her style and was first published by Doubleday Books in 1988.

Almost two million copies of her novels are now in print, and they have regularly appeared on the Waldenbooks, Borders, and Essence bestseller lists. She has been awarded the Gold Pen Award, the Emma Award, the Vivian Stephens Award for Excellence in Romance Writing, the Romantic Times Career Achievement Award, and the Zora Neale Hurston Literary Award. She writes full-time currently after retiring from her job as a Community Liaison Specialist for a state funded abuse program in Long Island.

== Bibliography ==
=== As Rochelle Alers ===
==== Single novels ====
- Careless Whispers, (1988)
- My Love's Keeper, (1991)
- Happily Ever After, (1994)
- Home Sweet Home, (1996)
- Reckless Surrender, (1997)
- Gentle Yearning, (1998)
- Summer Magic, (1999)
- A Younger Man, (2002)
- Secrets Never Told, (2003)
- Lessons of a Lowcountry Summer, (2004)
- All My Tomorrows, (2005)
- A Time to Keep, (2006)
- Pleasure Seekers, (2007)
- After Hours, (2008)
- Naughty, (2009)
- Butterfly, (2010)

==== The Hideaway Series ====
The Hideaway Series has started to be reissued on the Harlequin brand.

===== Prequels =====
1. Best-Kept Secrets (2010) Reissue 2010

===== First Generation =====
1. Hideaway (1995) Reissue 2009
2. Hidden Agenda (1997) Reissue 2009
3. Vows (1997) Reissue 2010
4. Heaven Sent (1998) Reissue 2010

===== Daughters and Sisters Trilogy =====
1. Harvest Moon (1999) Reissue 2011
2. Just Before Dawn (2000)
3. Private Passions (2001)
4. Stranger in My Arms (2007)
5. Breakaway(2010)

===== Sons and Brothers Trilogy =====
1. No Compromise (2002) Reissue 2009
2. Homecoming (2002)
3. Renegade (2003)
4. Secret Agenda (2009)

==== The Whitfields of New York ====
1. Long Time Coming (2008)
2. The Sweetest Temptation(2008)
3. Taken By Storm(2008)

==== The Best Men Trilogy ====
1. Man of Fate (2009)
2. Man of Fortune (2009)
3. Man of Fantasy (2009)

==== The Blackstones of Virginia ====
1. The Long Hot Summer (2004)
2. Very Private Duty (2004)
3. Beyond Business (2005)

==== The Eatons ====
1. Bittersweet Love, (2009)
2. Sweet Deception, (2009)
3. Sweet Dreams, (2010)
4. Twice The Temptation, (2010)
5. Sweet Persuasions, (2011)
6. Sweet Destiny, (2011)

==== Wainwright Legacy ====
1. Because of You, (2010)
2. Here I Am, (2011)

==== Collections ====
1. More Than Just Words, Vol. 6, (2010)

==== Anthologies in collaboration ====
- "Fresh Fruits" in Holiday Cheer (with Angela Benson and Shirley Hailstock) 1995/12
- "Hearts of gold" in Love Letters (with Donna Hill and Janice Sims) 1997/02
- Novella in Rosie's Curl and Weave (with Donna Hill, Felicia Mason and Francis Ray) 1999/02
- Novella in Island Magic (with Shirley Hailstock, Marcia King-Gamble and Felicia Mason) 2000/02
- "Sweet Surrender" in Della's House of Style (with Donna Hill, Felicia Mason and Francis Ray) 2000/07
- Novella in Welcome to Leo's (with Donna Hill, Brenda Jackson and Francis Ray) 2000/12
- "Stand-in bride" in Going to the Chapel (with Gwynne Forster, Donna Hill and Francis Ray) 2001/06
- "First Fruits" in 'Tis the Season (with Donna Hill and Candice Poarch) 2001/10
- "From the Heart" in Island Bliss (with Carmen Green, Marcia King-Gamble and Felicia Mason) 2002/02
- "Anniversary" in Twilight Moods 2002/09
- "Reunion" in Living Large (with Donna Hill, Brenda Jackson and Francis Ray) 2003/01
- "Summer Madness" in Four Degrees of Heat (with ReShonda Tate Billingsley, Brenda L. Thomas and Crystal Lacey Winslow) 2004/07
- "Love Lessons" in Let's Get it On (with Donna Hill, Brenda Jackson and Francis Ray) 2004/11
- Lost in Sensation & Very Private Duty (with Maureen Child) 2005/01
- The Long Hot Summer with Private Indiscretions by Susan Crosby 2005/02
- Very Private Duty with Beyond Control by Bronwyn Jameson) 2005/07
- Rules of Attraction & Beyond Business (with Susan Crosby) 2005/07
- "A Younger Man" in When You Least Expect It (with Brenda Jackson) 2005/09
- "Shepherd Moon" in A Season of Miracles (with Adrianne Byrd, Kayla Perrin and Janice Sims) 2005/10
- Beyond Business with Apache Nights by Sheri Whitefeather 2006/09

==== Nonfiction ====
- Getting Political: Stories of a Woman Mayor (2002) (with Alice Crozier and Joan Darrah)

=== As Susan James ===
==== Single novels ====
- Reckless Surrender 1997/04
