= Celeste O. Norfleet =

American writer

- Born: February 11, 1959 (age 66) Philadelphia, Pennsylvania, U.S.
- Occupation: Novelist
- Education: Moore College of Art and Design (BFA)
- Genre: Romance

Celeste O. Norfleet (born February 11, 1959, in Philadelphia, Pennsylvania) is a contemporary African-American novelist known for romance and young adult novels.

== Early years ==
Norfleet was born and raised in Philadelphia, Pennsylvania. After attending public school, she received her B.F.A. degree in fashion illustration from Moore College of Art and Design. She spent the next few years working in the advertising field, first as a graphic artist, and later as a creative art director.

== Writing ==
In 1991, Norfleet moved to Northern Virginia. A few years later, she began reading romance novels. After reading many novels in this genre, she wrote one herself in 1999. Priceless Gift, her first romance novel, was sold to BET Books in 2001, and published in March 2002. Priceless Gift began the Mamma Lou Matchmaker series of 11 books. Norfleet has since written more than twenty novels.

In 2007, Harlequin Kimani TRU released Norfleet's first young adult novel, Pushing Pause, which received positive reviews. This novel became the first in a series known as The Kenisha Lewis Series, written for teens and adults, which was followed by the books Fast Forward and Gettin’ Played.

Norfleet now writes romance novels full-time. She describes her stories as realistic with some humor, depicting strong, sexy characters involved in unpredictable adventures. She also writes dramatic fiction for young adults, reflecting current issues facing African-American teens. Norfleet has written for Harlequin's Kimani Press Arabesque, Harlequin Kimani Romance and Kimani Press TRU (young adult) lines.

== Acclaim ==
Norfleet is the recipient of six awards from Romance Slam Jam (RSJ), as well as a lifetime achievement award. She was also honored with the BRAB, 2016 Frances Ray Lifetime Literary Legacy Award.

== Personal life ==
Norfleet currently lives in Virginia with her family.

== Bibliography ==
=== Romance ===
- Priceless Gift, 2002
- A Christmas Wish, 2002
- Since Forever, 2003
- One Sure Thing, 2003, (featuring winner of the 2002 Arabesque Man cover contest)
- Reflections of You, 2004
- Irresistible You, 2004
- Only You, 2005
- The Fine Art of Love, 2005
- A Taste of Romance in Back In Your Arms (with Sandra Kitt and Deidre Savoy (Deirdre Savoy) ), 2006
- Love After All, 2007
- Following Love, 2008
- When Love Calls, 2008
- Sultry Storm, in Mother Nature Matchmaker (with Brenda Jackson and Carmen Green) 2009
- When It Feels So Right, 2009
- Love Me Now, 2009
- Cross My Heart, 2010
- Heart’s Choice, in Millionaire Matchmaker (with Donna Hill and Adrianne Byrd) 2010
- Flirting With Destiny, (Kimani Hottie Series) 2010
- Love’s Paradise, 2011
- Come Away with Me, 2011
- Just one Touch, 2011
- Just one Taste, 2012
- Forever Love, 2012
- Mine at Last, 2013
- The Thrill of You, 2013
- One Night in Georgia, 2019

=== Young adult novels ===
- Pushing Pause, 2007
- She Said, She Said, 2008 (with Jennifer Norfleet)
- Fast Forward, 2009
- Getting Played 2010
- Download Drama 2012

=== Omnibus ===
- Back in Your Arms, 2005
- This Holiday Magic, 2014
- A Christmas Kiss, 2015

=== Novellas ===
- A Taste of Romance, 2013

== Recognition ==
- Nominated - Rose Award, Since Forever, 2003
- Nominated - Romantic Times Book - Reviewer's Choice Award - Best African American Romance (2004)
- Nominated - Romantic Times Book - Career Achievement Award (2009)
- Nominated - Romance Slam Jam - Best Steamy Romance (2009)
- Nominated - Romantic Times Book - Author of The Year (2009)
- Finalist - YALSA - Quick Picks for Reluctant Readers List (2009)
