= Melodrama (disambiguation) =

Melodrama refers to a theatrical work which exaggerates plot and characters in order to appeal to the emotions.

Melodrama may also refer to:

- Melodrama (film genre), a film genre or mode of expression
- Melodrama (Daumier), a c. 1860 painting by Honoré Daumier
- Melodrama (The Crash album), 2003
- Melodrama, a 2004 album by Vibe Tribe
- Melodrama (Joel Kroeker album), 2004
- Melodrama (Lorde album), 2017, or the title song
  - Melodrama World Tour, held 2017–18 to promote the Lorde album
- "Melodrama" (Angelina Mango song), 2024
- "Melodrama" (Disiz and Theodora song), 2025
- "Melodrama", a song by Chromatics, from the album Dear Tommy
- "Melodrama" (メロドラマ), a song by natori and imase

== See also ==
- Melodrama/Random/Melbourne, a 2018 Australian film
- Melodrama Habibi, a 2008 Lebanese film
- Melodrama Publishing, an independent publishing company founded by Crystal Lacey Winslow
- Melodramma, a term in Italian opera
