= Elsie B. Washington =

American writer (1942–2009)

- Born: Elsie Bernice Washington; December 28, 1942; New York, U.S.
- Died: May 5, 2009 (aged 66); New York, New York, U.S.
- Education: City College of New York
- Occupations: Novelist, journalist
- Known for: Author of the first "ethnic romance"
- Writing career
- Pen name: Rosalind Welles
- Period: 1980
- Genre: Romance
- Notable work: Entwined Destinies (1980)

Elsie Bernice Washington (December 28, 1942 – May 5, 2009) was an American author whose 1980 work Entwined Destinies has been considered the first romance novel written by an African-American author featuring African-American characters.

== Early life and education ==
Washington was born in New York on December 28, 1942, to Samuel Washington and Kathleen Peterson Erby. She majored in English at the City College of New York, graduating with a bachelor's degree.

== Career ==
After completing college, she worked as a writer, and later as an editor, for several publications, including The New York Post, Essence, Life and Newsweek.

Her one and only novel, Entwined Destinies, was published in 1980 under the pen name Rosalind Welles by Dell Publishing, as the 575th title in its "Candlelight Romance" series of books. The book, which tells the story of a female African-American magazine reporter who finds true love with an African-American oil executive, was described as "the first known romance featuring African-American characters written by an African-American author" in a 2002 issue of Black Issues Book Review. By the time of Washington's death, several imprints were devoted to black romance novels, featuring books by authors such as Rochelle Alers, Beverly Jenkins and Sandra Kitt.

In 1996, the Milwaukee Journal Sentinel called Washington the "mother of the African-American romance", setting the groundwork for a revolution in ethnic romance novels. Washington's book was the first "ethnic romance", a category conceived by Vivian Stephens, an African-American editor at Dell, viewing the book as the first of other such books also aimed at Native Americans and Chinese Americans. The company published 125,000 copies of Washington's novel, primarily distributed in cities on the East Coast with large African-American populations.

Washington also wrote two works of non-fiction: her 1974 book Sickle Cell Anemia, co-written with Anthony Cerami, and the Uncivil War: The Struggle Between Black Men and Women, published in 1996. A 1998 article written by Washington for Essence magazine received notice after she criticized the trend of African Americans who comported to "white standards of beauty" through such techniques as the use of tinted contact lenses.

== Death ==
A resident of Yonkers, New York, Washington died in Manhattan at the age of 66 on May 5, 2009, due to multiple sclerosis and cancer. She was survived by her parents and a brother.
