= Rita Gallagher =

American novelist (1921–2004)

- Born: Rita Gallagher; September 1, 1921; Detroit, Michigan
- Died: February 2, 2004 (aged 82); Houston, Texas
- Occupations: Novelist, writing instructor
- Children: Rita Clay Estrada
- Writing career
- Pen name: Rita Gallagher
- Period: 1982–1999
- Genre: women's fiction

Rita Gallagher (September 1, 1921 – February 2, 2004), a founding member of the Romance Writers of America, was a noted writing instructor of romance novels. She also wrote three women's historical fiction novels from 1982 to 1986.

== Biography ==
Rita Gallagher was born September 1, 1921. She was crowned Miss Michigan at age nineteen, and married a U.S. Air Force pilot, her second husband, in 1949. She is the mother of the writer Rita Clay Estrada from her first marriage, and two sons, Jeffrey and Gregory, from her second. Gallagher and her daughter, along with romance novelists Parris Afton Bonds, Sondra Stanford, and Peggy Cleaves created the Romance Writers of America (R.W.A.), holding its first-ever conference in 1981 at The Woodlands, Texas.

From 1982 to 1986, she published three women's historical fiction novels, "Shadows on the Wind," "Shadowed Destiny," and "Passion Star." In later life, she was a writing instructor for aspiring romance novelists, with numerous of her students becoming published authors. She also published with her daughter the books: "Writing Romances" and "You Can Write a Romance". Gallagher died February 2, 2004, in Houston at age 82.

== Bibliography ==
=== Shadows Series ===
1. Shadows on the Wind, (1982)
2. Shadowed Destiny, (1985)

=== Novels ===
- Passion Star, (1986)

=== Non-fiction ===
- Writing Romances (1997) (with Rita Clay Estrada)
- You Can Write a Romance (1999) (with Rita Clay Estrada)
