= Sarah Wendell =

American romance novelist and blogger

- Writing career
- Subject: Romance novels
- Notable works: Beyond Heaving Bosoms: The Smart Bitches' Guide to Romance Novels (2009), with Candy Tan
- Website: Smart Bitches, Trashy Books

Sarah Wendell is an American writer and blogger specializing in romance novels, which she reviews on her website Smart Bitches, Trashy Books. She has been described as "an influential romance blogger". The book about romance novels she co-wrote with Candy Tan, Beyond Heaving Bosoms: The Smart Bitches' Guide to Romance Novels (2009), has been described as an example of fan scholarship.

== Early life and education ==
Wendell grew up in Pittsburgh. She attended Columbia College (South Carolina), and has a degree in English and Spanish.

== Career ==
Wendell and Candy Tan set up Smart Bitches, Trashy Books in 2005. The website's slogan is "All of the romance, none of the bullshit". It is a book review site, where "hundreds" of romance novels have been reviewed. Wendell also presents a podcast, Smart Podcast, Trashy Books.

Wendell is an advocate for the importance of romance literature; she has said "I am going to say the following, again and again and again: romances are good. Romances are fantastic, in fact. There are terribly few places wherein women's emotional experiences, personal troubles and intimate sexuality are portrayed favorably". On the prejudice against romance novels, she has said "There are a lot of reasons why romance as a genre is dismissed. Plain old, everyday, garden-variety sexism. This is a genre that's written by and actually read by women, and most of the editors and industry professionals are also women. It's a women-dominated genre and a women-dominated profession and for that reason alone it becomes an object of ridicule." The critic Linda Holmes has written of Wendell's "tireless defense of the readers she's met" and, of Beyond Heaving Bosoms: The Smart Bitches' Guide to Romance Novels, that "It's always refreshing when anybody cares about anything enough to put a title on a book that is guaranteed to draw the same angry snorts she's been hearing for the last ... oh, five or ten years".

Wendell has written and spoken about how romance novels and the publishing industry has represented, or failed to represent, Black and minority ethnic people.

In 2015, Wendell wrote an open letter to the Romance Writers of America to censure their decision to include an inspirational, Christian romance novel set in a concentration camp, For Such a Time by Kate Breslin, on the list of nominations for RITA Awards. She said of the book "The heroine's conversion at the end underscores the idea that the correct path is Christianity, erases her Jewish identity, and echoes the forced conversions of many Jews before, during, and after the Holocaust".

Wendell, and her co-writer Candy Tan, "feel the romance genre is deserving of far more scholarly attention than it currently receives ... [and] advocate for more scholarly engagement in the cultural discourse about the romance genre".

The romance novelist Sharon Kendrick dedicated a book to Wendell after Wendell reviewed her novel The Playboy Sheikh's Virgin Stable Girl and described it as "so ridiculous, you can’t put it down. It is its own drinking game", and gave it a grade of D+.

Wendell has written a romance novella, Lighting the Flames: A Hanukkah story.

== Critical reception ==
NPR has described the website as "an exhaustively thorough and delightfully snippy analysis of romance fiction for both readers and writers".

Beyond Heaving Bosoms: The Smart Bitches' Guide to Romance Novels was described by NPR as taking "a loving - and yes, sometimes catty - look at the world of romance writing". Laura Vivanco, reviewing it on the blog Teach Me Tonight, wrote that the book "contains many serious insights into the genre ... [and] focuses on issues related to sexuality and gender (although the authors do tackle a number of other issues)"; she thought that the book's history of romance literature was limited. The critic Courtney Watson notes the book's discussion of sexual consent. Chris Szego wrote that the book is written "not from the perspective of distant academicsm but as passionately invested readers", and said "it should be required reading for writers, publishers, booksellers, and readers too, because the questions they raise are important". The critic Catherine Roach has described Heaving Bosoms as "wickedly funny, unapologetically fan-based, and critically astute", and as an example of fan scholarship.

A review by Lynne Maxwell of Everything I Know About Love I Learned from Romance Novels in the Library Journal said that the book "has convinced this reviewer: romance novels are not mere frivolities designed to convey guilty pleasure to their devoted readers. Rather, they serve an important educational function, i.e., to teach readers about the vagaries and realities of love and romance". Kate Cuthbert in the NY Journal of Books described Everything I Know About Love I Learned from Romance Novels as "an anecdotal study of the positive benefit reading romance novels can have on relationships, self-esteem, self-awareness, and love", but said that the book does not have "a clear focus and intended audience ... Her evidence is anecdotal and self-selected — and therefore won't convince those unwilling to be convinced. Those willing to be convinced already are. This is a funny, witty little tome, but it's going to have a hard place finding a home".

== Personal life ==
Wendell lives in the New York metropolitan area. She is married, and has two children. She is a convert to Judaism.

== Bibliography ==
- Beyond Heaving Bosoms: The Smart Bitches' Guide to Romance Novels (2009, Touchstone), with Candy Tan
- Everything I Know about Love I Learned from Romance Novels (2011, Sourcebooks)
- Lighting the Flames: A Hanukkah story (2014, CreateSpace)
- "A Conversation That Can't Be Controlled", in A Futurist's Manifesto: Essays from the bleeding edge of publishing (2012, O'Reilly Media), edited by Hugh McGuire and Brian O'Leary
- "'You call me a bitch like that's a bad thing': Romance Criticism and Redefining the Word "Bitch"", in New Approaches to Popular Romance Fiction: Critical Essays (2014, McFarland), edited by Sarah S.G. Frantz and Eric Murphy Selinger
