= Carolyn Nichols =

American editor, author, publishing executive

- Born: Carolyn Ione McKnight; July 28, 1939; Monroe, Louisiana
- Died: October 21, 2017 (aged 78); Portland, Oregon
- Education: George Washington University

Carolyn Nichols (July 29, 1939 – October 21, 2017) was an American editor, publishing executive, and author, primarily known for her work in the romance genre. One of the key editors of the boom in American romance fiction in the early 1980s, Nichols was responsible for the creation of the Second Chance at Love line for Berkley-Jove in 1980, as well as the Loveswept line for Bantam in 1982.

== Early life ==
Carolyn Ione McKnight was born in Monroe, Louisiana, on July 29, 1939. She was raised in the Washington, D.C., area and graduated from Wilson High School in 1957 before attending George Washington University. She was married to Dr. Rodney W. Nichols, with whom she had a son. The marriage ended in divorce.

== Career ==
Nichols served as a writer and producer for WETA in Washington in the 1960s before turning her attention to writing fiction. Between 1974 and 1979, she wrote Regency and gothic romances under the pen names Iona Charles and Carolyn McKnight.

In 1978, Nichols joined Berkley-Jove as an editor. Shortly after her arrival, Nichols suggested the creation of a new line of romance novels to compete with the Harlequin Presents line. Her suggestion went nowhere until 1980, when Vivian Stephens launched the Candlelight Ecstasy line at Dell, which brought an increased sensuality to romance that proved enormously popular with American readers. Nichols revisited her earlier concept and developed Second Chance at Love, which focused on older main characters who had been divorced or windowed and were now getting their second chance. At its creation, the line was intensely formulaic- John Market describes the line's guideline as running for five single spaced typed pages.

The success of Second Chance at Love resulted in Nichols being hired away by Bantam in April 1982. The publisher had already launched the category romance line Circle of Love earlier that year, modeled on the relatively chaste formula of Harlequin Romance. The line almost immediately failed, which Nichols chalked up to a combination of flawed research and the unfortunate timing of its arrival immediately after the launch of more explicit competitors.

Nichols immediately began creating a new line for Bantam, which she called Loveswept. The line launched in May 1983, and contained multiple elements that distinguished it from competitors. Nichols believed that readers were beginning to seek out specific authors instead of blindly buying brands, so she created Loveswept as an author-centered line- no pseudonyms were allowed, and the inside covers of each book featured a picture of the author along with an author's note. The extensive guidelines like those Nichols helped create for Second Chance at Love were also eschewed, allowing authors more freedom to create characters and plots. The approach resonated with readers and authors alike, and the line lasted more than 900 volumes, coming to an end in 1999. Loveswept was resurrected as an ebook line by Random House in 2011.

After departing Bantam, Nichols went on to Ballantine and then New American Library, from where she retired in 2001as Vice President and Executive Director, Editorial.

Carolyn Nichols died October 21, 2017, at her home in Portland, Oregon.
