= Rita Clay Estrada =

American novelist

- Born: Rita Clay; July 31, 1941 (age 85); Michigan, US
- Occupation: Novelist
- Children: 4
- Relatives: Rita Gallagher (mother)
- Writing career
- Pen name: Rita Clay, Tira Lacy, Rita Clay Estrada
- Period: 1982–2001
- Genre: Romance

Rita Clay Estrada (born July 31, 1941, in Michigan, United States) is an American writer of romance novels, which she publishes under the names Rita Clay, Tira Lacy and Rita Clay Estrada. She has also written non-fiction books about writing romance novels. She was the first president of the Romance Writers of America, and founding member with her mother Rita Gallagher.

== Biography ==
Born Rita Clay on July 31, 1941, in Michigan, United States. Her mother, Rita Gallagher, was a romance novelist and writing instructor, while her father was a pilot with the U.S. Air Force. She spent much of her early years living in Europe. She married her high school sweetheart James Estrada on August 22, 1959 and stayed at home to raise their four children. In 1977, when she had been married about 20 years, her husband brought her a typewriter and said, "'You said you always wanted to write. Now write.'"

She and her husband are divorced.

== Career ==
Estrada's first attempt was a long historical romance which was promptly rejected. Her next manuscript, a contemporary romance, was likewise rejected. Her third manuscript, Wanderer's Dream, sold to Silhouette Books. She used her maiden name, Rita Clay for that and an additional seven titles for Silhouette. In 1982, she moved to Dell to write for their Candlelight Ecstasy line. Harlequin owned her pen name, so she wrote as Tira Lacy, an anagram of Rita Clay. In 1985 she re-signed with Harlequin and asked to use her full name, Rita Clay Estrada, on all future books.

She generally takes 4.5 months to write a novel. Except for punctuation and fact-checking, she does very little rewriting, as "that's why there are editors." Generally, she writes five pages each night and more on the weekends. Her novels have been translated in 23 languages.

Estrada was a founding member and the first president of the Romance Writers of America (RWA). Beginning in 1990, the organization's signature, the RITA, was named for Estrada. In 2020, after controversy stemming from the RWA's response to issues regarding diversity and inclustion, the RITA was retired and replaced by the Vivian Award, named for RWA founder Vivian Stephens.

The RWA also awarded Estrada their Lifetime Achievement Award in 2000.

== Works ==
=== Novels ===
==== As Rita Clay ====
===== Single novels =====
- Wanderer's Dream (1981)
- Sweet Eternity (1982)
- Yesterday's Dreams (1982)
- Experiment in Love (1983)
- Summer Song (1983)

===== Wise Folly Series =====
1. Wise Folly (1982)
2. Recapture the Love (1984)

===== Omnibus in collaboration =====
- Visible Heart / Handyman Special / Wanderer's Dream (1992) (with Dixie Browning, Pamela Browning)

==== As Tira Lacy ====
===== Single novels =====
- With time and tenderness (1983)
- Only for love (1984)

==== As Rita Clay Estrada ====
===== Will and the Way Series =====
1. Will and the Way (1985)
2. A Woman's Choice (1985)
3. Something to Treasure (1986)

===== Western Lovers: Ranchin' Dads Series Multi-Author =====
15. The Best Things in Life (1986)

===== Montclair Emeralds Multi-Author =====
3. Trust (1988)

===== Bartholomew Family Saga =====
1. Second to None (1989)
2. The Lady Says No (1991)

===== Lost Loves Series Multi-Author =====
3. Forms of Love (1994)

===== The Wrong Bed Series Multi-Author =====
4. Love Me, Love My Bed (1996)

===== Rebels & Rogues Multi-Author =====
- The Stormchaser (1996)

===== Gallagher Sisters Saga =====
1. Wishes (1997)
2. Dreams (1998)
3. Everything About Him (1998)

===== Bachelor Auction Series Multi-Author =====
- One Wild Weekend (1999)

===== Single novels =====
- The Ivory Key (1987)
- A Little Magic (1987)
- To Buy a Groom (1990)
- Twice Loved (1991)
- One More Time (1993)
- The Colonel's Daughter (1993)
- Interlude in Time (1994)
- The Twelve Gifts of Christmas (1994)
- Million Dollar Valentine (2000)
- Blissful (2000)
- Too Wicked to Love (2001)

===== Omnibus in collaboration =====
- To Have and to Hold (1992) (with Sandra James, Debbie Macomber and Barbara Bretton)
- Conveniently Yours (1994) (with Sally Bradford and Bobby Hutchinson)
- Expecting! (1996) (with Barbara Delinsky and Michelle Reid)
- Bedazzled (2002) (with Jayne Ann Krentz and Vicki Lewis Thompson)

===== Non-fiction =====
- Writing Romances (1997) (with Rita Gallagher)
- You Can Write a Romance (1999) (with Rita Gallagher)

== See also ==
- List of romantic novelists
