= Suzanne Brockmann =

American romantic fiction writer

- Born: 1960 (age 65–66); United States
- Occupation: Novelist
- Writing career
- Pen name: Anne Brock
- Period: 1993–present
- Genres: Romance, military/romantic suspense
- Notable works: Body Guard, Undercover Princess
- Notable awards: RITA award – Contemporary Single Title; 2000 Body Guard RITA award – Long Contemporary Romance; 2000 Undercover Princess RWA Nora Roberts Lifetime Achievement Award; 2018
- Website: www.suzannebrockmann.com

Suzanne Brockmann (born 1960) is an American romantic fiction writer. She lives near Boston, Massachusetts, with her husband, Ed Gaffney, and their two children, Melanie and Jason T. Gaffney. She has also written works under the name Anne Brock.

== Biography ==
Brockmann attended Boston University's School of Broadcasting and Film majoring in film and minoring in creative writing before dropping out to join a band. Afterwards, she met her husband and started a family. It was after having her second child that Brockmann started writing. Initially, she focused on television scripts, screen plays and Star Trek novels but after doing research she decided to focus her efforts on the romance genre. Her first published novel, Future Perfect in 1993, was written along with nine other manuscripts in 1992 after her decision to publish a romance novel.

In 1996, Brockmann published the first in her Tall, Dark & Dangerous series. The series develops among a fictional group of US Navy SEALs. The books following in the series, and that of the Troubleshooters, Inc. series, are all classified in a subgenre known as "military/romantic suspense".

Brockmann has attracted the attention of magazines such as Out and Bay Windows, both of which serve the gay community, due to a subplot dealing with the romance of an openly gay character in her Troubleshooters, Inc. series. Brockmann has said that she is a PFLAG mom, supporting her gay son, Jason, and dedicating her 2004 book Hot Target to him. In 2007, Brockmann donated the profits of her holiday novella, All Through the Night, to MassEquality.

In 2014, she began writing a young adult paranormal trilogy, Night Sky, with her daughter, Melanie Brockmann.

== List of works ==
Tall, Dark and Dangerous

1. Prince Joe, Silhouette Intimate Moments, June 1996, reissued by Mira, May 2002
2. Forever Blue, Silhouette Intimate Moments, October 1996, reissued by Mira, February 2003
3. Frisco's Kid, Silhouette Intimate Moments, January 1997, reissued by Mira, June 2003
4. Everyday, Average Jones, Silhouette Intimate Moments, August 1998
5. Harvard's Education, Silhouette Intimate Moments, October 1998
6. It Came Upon a Midnight Clear (Revised in 2005 to "Hawken's Heart"), Silhouette Intimate Moments, December 1998
7. Admiral's Bride, Silhouette Intimate Moments, November 1999
8. Identity: Unknown, Silhouette Intimate Moments, January 2000
9. Get Lucky, Silhouette Intimate Moments, March 2000
10. Taylor's Temptation, Silhouette Intimate Moments, July 2001
11. Night Watch, Silhouette Intimate Moments, September 2003
12. SEAL Camp, 2018
13. King's Ransom, 2020

Troubleshooters

1. Unsung Hero, Ivy, June 2000
2. Defiant Hero, Ivy, March 2001
3. Over the Edge, Ivy, September 2001
4. Out of Control, Ballantine, March 2002
5. Into the Night, Ballantine, November 2002
6. Gone Too Far, Ballantine, July 2003
7. Flashpoint, Ballantine, March 2004
8. Hot Target, Ballantine, December 2004
9. Breaking Point, Ballantine, July 2005
10. Into the Storm, Ballantine, November 2006
11. Force of Nature, Ballantine, August 2007
12. All Through the Night, Ballantine, October 2007
13. Into the Fire, Ballantine, July 2008
14. Dark of Night, Ballantine, 2009
15. Hot Pursuit, Ballantine, July 2009
16. Breaking the Rules, Ballantine, March 2011
17. Headed for Trouble, Ballantine, March 2013
18. Do or Die, Ballantine, Reluctant Heroes #1, February 2014
19. Some Kind of Hero, Ballantine, July 11, 2017
20. Jules Cassidy, P.I., Suzanne Brockmann Books, January 2026

Troubleshooters - Short stories and Novellas

- When Tony Met Adam, Ballantine e-short story, June 2011
- Beginnings and Endings, Ballantine e-short story, June 2012
- Headed for Trouble, Ballantine, TS short story anthology, May 2013
- Free Fall, e-short story, December 2014
- Home Fire Inferno, e-short story, May 2015
- Ready to Roll, e-short story, Fall 2016
- Murphy's Law, a Navy SEAL e-short, originally published March 2001

Stand alone novels

- Future Perfect, Meteor Kismet, August 1993
- Hero Under Cover, Silhouette Intimate Moments, June 1994
- Embraced By Love, Pinnacle, January 1995
- Not Without Risk, Silhouette Intimate Moments, June 1995
- A Man to Die For, Silhouette Intimate Moments, December 1995
- No Ordinary Man, Harlequin Intrigue, April 1996
- Kiss and Tell, Bantam Loveswept, May 1996
- The Kissing Game, Bantam Loveswept, December 1996
- Otherwise Engaged, Bantam Loveswept, February 1997
- Forbidden, Bantam Loveswept, April 1997
- Stand-In Groom, Bantam Loveswept, June 1997
- Ladies' Man, Bantam Loveswept, August 1997
- Time Enough For Love, Bantam Loveswept, November 1997
- Give Me Liberty, Precious Gems, Fall 97 (as Anne Brock)
- Love With the Proper Stranger, Silhouette Intimate Moments, January 1998
- Freedom's Price, Bantam Loveswept, February 1998
- Body Language, Bantam Loveswept, May 1998
- Heart Throb, Fawcett, March 1999
- Undercover Princess, Silhouette Intimate Moments, December 1999
- Bodyguard, Fawcett, December 1999
- Letters to Kelly, Silhouette Intimate Moments, April 2003
- Scenes of Passion, Silhouette Desire, July 2003
- Infamous, Ballantine, July 2010
- Born to Darkness, Ballantine, March 2012

== Awards and reception ==
Awards for Suzanne Brockmann
Year	Nominated work	Category	Award	Result	Notes	Ref.
2000	Body Guard	Contemporary Single Title	Romance Writers of America RITA Award	Won		
2000	Undercover Princess	Long Contemporary Romance	Romance Writers of America RITA Award	Won		
2018			RWA Nora Roberts Lifetime Achievement Award	Won		

Brockmann has also appeared on the Romance Writers of America Honor Roll for having appeared on both the USA Today and the New York Times Best Sellers lists. She has been the recipient of the Romantic Times Reviewers' Choice Awards in 1996, 1998 and 1999, as well as the Romantic Times Career Achievement Award for Series Romance in 1997, 2000 and 2002.
