= Alyssa Cole =

American romance writer

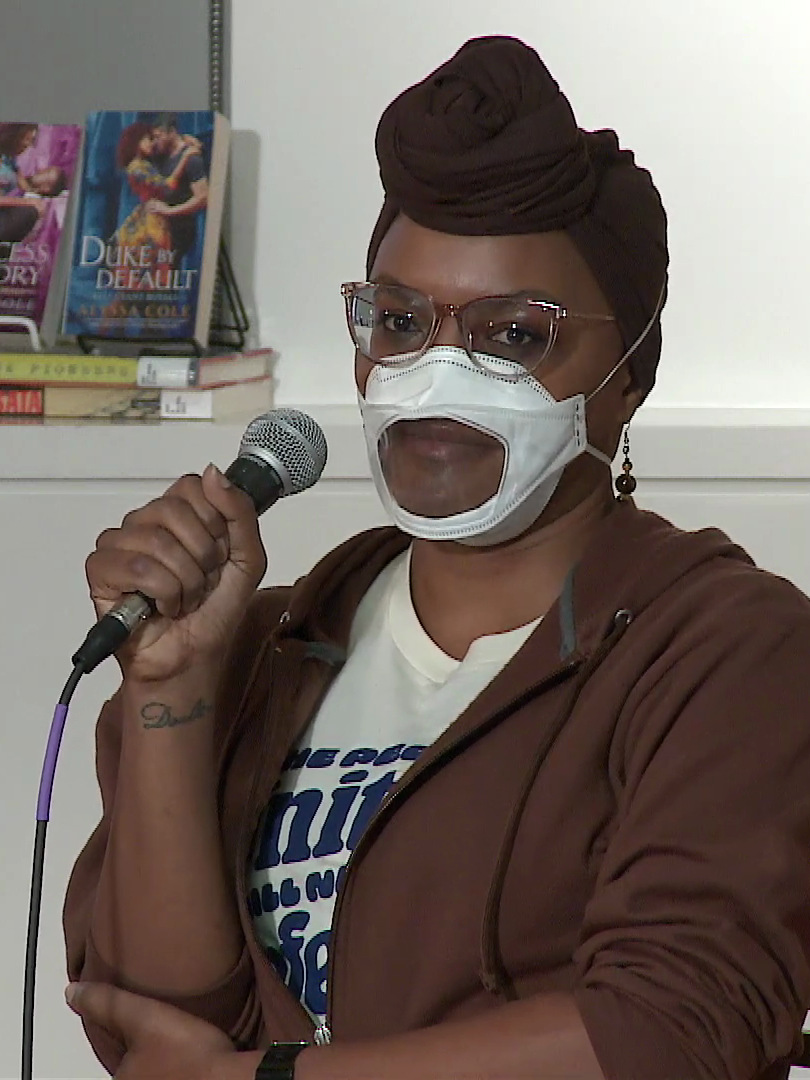
- Alyssa Cole in 2023
- Born: August 12, 1982 (age 44); New York City, U.S.
- Occupation: Novelist
- Writing career
- Language: English
- Years active: 2014–present
- Genres: Romance fiction, Historical romance, science fiction
- Notable works: An Extraordinary Union; A Princess in Theory; When No One Is Watching
- Website: www.alyssacole.com

Alyssa Cole (born August 12, 1982) is an American author of historical, science fiction, mystery, thriller and contemporary romance novels. Her stories include diverse casts of characters with a variety of professions, from Civil War spies to modern day epidemiologists. Her romance works to explore both straight and gay relationships.

== Career ==
Alyssa Cole began her writing career by publishing collections of short stories and novellas. Her stories tend to take place during important events in American history, including the civil rights movement, the Revolutionary War, and the Harlem Renaissance.

Cole's Loyal League novels, a trilogy taking place with the backdrop of the American Civil War, is represented by Kensington Publishing Corporation. Her Reluctant Royals novels, a contemporary romance series inspired by modern-day royalty, is represented by Avon Romance.

Alyssa Cole has collaborated with other authors on anthologies. These authors include Rose Learner, Courtney Milan, Lena Hart, Kianna Alexander, Piper Huguley, and Kate McMurray. At times, Cole has taken part in the month-long challenge of National Novel Writing Month (NaNoWriMo) to encourage her writing habits and finish longer works.

Cole's An Extraordinary Union, published in 2017, won multiple awards, and her book A Princess in Theory was named one of The New York Times most notable books of 2018. Her 2020 thriller novel When No One Is Watching garnered acclaim from critics.

Cole is a prominent figure in the effort to increase the representation of Black authors in the romance publishing industry. Her discussion for the need for diversity in the genre has occurred in convention panels and on Twitter.

In late December 2019, Romance Writers of America (RWA) suspended Courtney Milan, chair of the ethics committee, after other romance authors filed complaints with the RWA because she highlighted racist tropes in those authors' books on social media. With Milan's permission, Alyssa Cole made documents related to the dispute public on Twitter.

In 2020, Cole published her first mystery/thriller novel, When No One Is Watching.

== Themes ==
Cole's writing often contains political and activist elements. One of her historical novel series takes place during the Civil War and contains heroines and heroes who are involved in important political events in American history. Another historical series, set in the American 1960s, sees Cole's characters in the middle of the civil rights movement. Cole's works of historical fiction set in America often thematically connect love and freedom. Her contemporary novel, A Princess in Theory, contains a hero who is a prince of a small, fictional African country that deals with advances and issues modeled after real life nations of similar size and geography.

== Personal life ==
Cole was born in the Bronx, and spent her childhood there and in Jersey City.

Cole mainly resides in the Caribbean island of Martinique, but also spends a portion of her time in New York City.

During the process of writing a character with ADHD, Cole discovered she also lived with the same diagnosis.

== Bibliography ==
Title	Series	Publication year	ISBN/ASIN	Notes
Sweet to the Taste		2014	B00IJYGP76	
For Love & Liberty: Untold Love Stories of the American Revolution		2014	9781941885017	Anthology. Cole wrote "Be Not Afraid."
Eagle's Heart		2014	B00HZ6CJVA	
Radio Silence	Off the Grid #1	2015	9781539664666	
Signal Boost	Off the Grid #2	2015	9781539694663	
Mixed Signals	Off the Grid #3	2015	9781539712565	
The Brightest Day: A Juneteenth Historical Romance Anthology		2015	9781519616470	Anthology. Cole wrote "Let It Shine."
Be Not Afraid		2016	9781530675029	Previously published in For Love and Liberty.
Let it Shine		2016	9781530758067	Previously published in The Brightest Day.
Agnes Moor's Wild Knight		2016	9781530771561	
Daughters of a Nation: A Black Suffragette Historical Romance Anthology		2016	9781941885345	Anthology. Cole wrote "Let Us Dream."
Let Us Dream		2017	9781544766195	Previously published in Daughters of a Nation.
An Extraordinary Union	The Loyal League #1	2017	9781496707444	
Hamilton's Battalion: A Trio of Romances		2017	9781977530691	
A Hope Divided	The Loyal League #2	2017	9781496707468	
Best Women's Erotica of the Year, Volume 4		2018	9781627782487	Anthology. Cole wrote "Essential Qualities."
A Princess in Theory	Reluctant Royals #1	2018	9780062685544	
A Duke by Default	Reluctant Royals #2	2018	9780062685568	
Bingo Love Volume 1: Jackpot Edition		2018	9781534310247	
Once Ghosted, Twice Shy	Reluctant Royals #2.5	2019	9780062931870	
An Unconditional Freedom	The Loyal League #3	2019	9781496707482	
Can't Escape Love	Reluctant Royals #2.6	2019	9781982649012	
A Prince on Paper	Reluctant Royals #3	2019	9780062685582	
The A.I. Who Loved Me		2019	B07WQYP9MM	
How to Catch a Queen	Runaway Royals #1	2020	9780062933966	
When No One Is Watching		2020	9780062982650	
How to Find a Princess	Runaway Royals #2	2021	9780062934000	
Marple: Twelve New Mysteries		2022	9780063136052	Anthology. Cole wrote "Miss Marple Takes Manhattan."
Just a Girl		2023	9781662512025	
Fit for the Gods: Greek Mythology Reimagined		2023	9780593469248	Anthology. Cole wrote "Stasis (Bastion in the Spring)."
One of Us Knows		2024	9780063297135	

== Awards ==
- 2017 - An Extraordinary Union - Vulture's 10 Best Romance Books of 2017
- 2017 - An Extraordinary Union - Booklist Top 10 Romances 2017
- 2017 - An Extraordinary Union - Publishers Weekly Best Books of 2017, Romance
- 2018 - An Extraordinary Union - American Library Association RUSA Best Romance
- 2019 - An Unconditional Freedom - The Ripped Bodice Awards for Excellence in Romance Fiction
- 2019 - Once Ghosted Twice Shy - The Ripped Bodice Awards for Excellence in Romance Fiction
- 2019 - A Prince on Paper - The Ripped Bodice Awards for Excellence in Romance Fiction
- 2019 - A Prince on Paper - New York Public Library Best Books for Adults 2019
- 2021 – When No One Is Watching – Edgar Award for Best Paperback Original.
