= For Such a Time =

2014 Novel by Kate Breslin

- First edition
- Author: Kate Breslin
- Language: English
- Genre: Romance; Historical romance; Inspirational; Christian
- Published: 2014
- Publisher: Bethany House Publishers
- Publication place: United States
- Pages: 432

For Such a Time is a 2014 debut romance novel by Kate Breslin.

The novel is considered controversial because of its subject matter of a Jewish woman falling in love with the head of a Nazi concentration camp during World War II and then converting to Christianity.

== Plot ==
In 1944, a blonde-haired and blue-eyed Jewish woman, Hadassah Benjamin, is saved from a firing squad and forced into service by Colonel Aric von Schmidt of the SS. At a military camp in Czechoslovakia, Hadassah hides behind a false identity in order to survive as Colonel Aric’s secretary.

== Controversy ==
The blogger Sarah Wendell wrote an open letter to the Romance Writers of America in 2015 to censure their decision to include the novel on the list of nominations for RITA Awards. Wendell said of the book "The heroine's conversion at the end underscores the idea that the correct path is Christianity, erases her Jewish identity, and echoes the forced conversions of many Jews before, during, and after the Holocaust".

The board of directors of the RWA responded that "Censoring entry content is not something the board supports".
