= An Extraordinary Union =

2017 romance novel by Alyssa Cole

- Author: Alyssa Cole
- Language: English
- Genre: Fiction, Romance, Historical Fiction
- Publisher: Kensington Books
- Publication date: March 28, 2017
- Publication place: United States
- Followed by: A Hope Divided

An Extraordinary Union is a 2017 romance novel by American author Alyssa Cole. It was received favorably by critics and named to multiple best-of lists. It won multiple awards but was passed over by Romance Writers of America's nominations process for their major award, sparking discussions of racism within the romance fiction industry.

== Plot ==
Freedwoman Ellen Burns, who has an eidetic memory, poses as a mute enslaved person in the Richmond, Virginia, household of a Confederate senator to gather intelligence for the Union. Scottish immigrant Malcolm McCall is a Pinkerton detective posing as a Confederate soldier to spy on the family Ellen has been "loaned" to. The two overcome obstacles to falling in love.

== Series ==
The book is the first installment in Cole's The Loyal League series set during the American Civil War. Other books in the series include A Hope Divided and An Unconditional Freedom.

== Reception ==
Kirkus called it "a masterful tale" and said it "defies genre stereotypes at every turn (and) offers a nuanced portrayal of Civil War–era racial politics. Any reader who thinks romance novels are pure fluff will be schooled by Cole's richly drawn characters, who must overcome generations of trauma in order to let themselves love each other."

Entertainment Weekly named it to their best romances of 2017 and said Cole "paints masterfully in shades of gray" a story of interracial romance that "interrogates slavery, systemic racism, and more, while still remaining utterly swoon-worthy."

Vulture named it to their best romances of 2017 and said it was elegantly and deftly written.

Publishers Weekly gave it a starred review, calling it a "smartly written espionage romance brimming with vivid characterization, heartfelt dialogue, and sensual sweetness" and "sparkling gem of a romance".

== Industry fallout ==
The book sparked discussion of racism within the romance fiction industry when, after having been one of the most reviewed romances of 2017, winning other awards, and being included on multiple major best-of lists, it was passed over by Romance Writers of America's Rita nominating process and not included among the finalists for the award. The finalists that year were all books by white authors. Cole is Black.
