= Kate McMurray =

American novelist (born 1980)

- Born: July 3, 1980 (age 45)
- Occupation: Author
- Website: katemcmurray.com

Kate McMurray (born July 3, 1980) is an author of gay romance who has served as president of Rainbow Romance Writers, the LGBT romance chapter of Romance Writers of America. Her stories have been published in English, French, Italian, and Spanish. She was born on July 3, 1980, and lives with her two cats in Brooklyn, NY.

Kate was appointed to the Romance Writers of America (RWA) board of directors in May 2019.

== Bibliography ==
=== Novels ===
- Across the East River Bridge (2012) Winner of the 2012 Rainbow Award as Best Gay Paranormal/Horror
- Kindling Fire With Snow (2010)
- Across the East River Bridge (2012)
- Out in the Field (2012)
- There Has to Be a Reason (2017)
- Such a Dance (2015)
- The Boy Next Door (2016)
- In Hot Pursuit (2010)
- The Wind Up
- Save the Date
- Four Corners (English Edition) (2012)
- Cuatro Esquinas (Spanish Edition) (2014)
- Les quatre coins (French Edition) (2014)
- Alle quattro basi (Italian Edition) (2015)
- The Silence of the Stars (2014)
- Ten Days in August (2016)
- In Hot Pursuit (2018) ISBN 978-1607376224

Dreamspun Desires Series

- The Greek Tycoon’s Green Card Groom (Dreamspun Desires 14) (2016)

The Rainbow League Book Series

- The Windup (Book 1) (April 24, 2015)
- Thrown a Curve (Book 2) (June 19, 2015)
- The Long Slide Home (Book 3) (August 14, 2015)

=== Short fiction ===
- One Man to Remember (Playing Ball: Anthology) (2013) Winner of the 2014 Rainbow Award as best Anthology
- Rebels at heart* (For Love & Liberty: Untold love stories of the American Revolution: Anthology)
