= Brenda Jackson =

American novelist (born 1953)

- Born: February 2, 1953 (age 73); Jacksonville, Florida, U.S.
- Education: Jacksonville University
- Occupation: Writer
- Writing career
- Genre: Romance

Brenda Streater Jackson (born February 2, 1953) is an American novelist who writes contemporary multicultural romance novels. She was the first African-American author to have a novel published as part of the Silhouette Desire line, and has seen many of her novels reach The New York Times and USAToday bestsellers lists. Jackson reached a milestone in her career in October 2013 when she published her 100th novel, becoming the first African American to achieve this milestone.

== Biography ==
Brenda Jackson was born and raised in Jacksonville, Florida. She married Gerald, her high school sweetheart, in 1972 after graduating from high school. She went on to earn a degree in business administration from Jacksonville University, and to expand their family by having two sons, Gerald Jr., a Jacksonville-based filmmaker, and Brandon, who is a Political Officer in the US Foreign Service.

To relieve job-related stress in the early 1990s, Jackson began reading romance novels. Although she enjoyed the novels, she was dissatisfied with the lack of cultural and ethnic diversity in the characters. After complaining to her husband that she could do better, he registered her for a romance writers conference and encouraged her to try her hand at writing. At the conference, Jackson met then-unpublished authors Francis Ray and Rochelle Alers and became inspired to write.

Jackson was determined to write novels that are multicultural romances, featuring African-American characters, that "convey the belief that love is every[where]." Her first novel, Tonight and Forever was published in 1995. This and the next few books followed the fictional Madaris brothers, giving Jackson an opportunity to portray professional African-American men who were both "appreciative and respectful of women." Her heroes are in many ways inspired by her husband, whom she considers to be "a very strong African-American male [who] is supportive and centers his life around his family."

In 2001, Jackson released her first mainstream women's fiction novel, A Family Reunion. As with her previous romance novels, this book contains a "sexy spark," as well as Jackson's familiar "polished and confident" writing style, which allows her "characters [to] burst with color right off the page." The following year, in 2002, she became the first African-American author to have a novel published as part of the Silhouette Desire line.

Despite publishing 11 books in the first ten years of her writing career, as of 2005, Jackson considers writing to be her hobby, and she continues to work full-time as a manager at State Farm Insurance.

Throughout her writing career, Jackson has written for several publishers, including St.Martins Press, BET, Kensington, NAL, Harlequin/Silhouette and Harlequin Kimani Romance.

== Recognition ==
Jackson has received awards and made accomplishments by being the first African-American author to have a book published under the Harlequin/Silhouette Desire line of books and the first African-American romance author to make USA Today's Bestsellers List and to make The New York Times Bestsellers List.

Jackson is the recipient of the RWA Nora Roberts Lifetime Achievement Award 2012, the highest honor bestowed by RWA in recognition of significant contributions to the romance genre. Additionally, she received the Sara Blocker Award 2012 from Florida Memorial University, the highest award given to a female for exceptional service to the university and for community service. Additional she was an "NAACP Image Award Nominee" 2012 for Outstanding Literary Fiction for her novel, A Silken Thread. She has won the Romantic Times Career Achievement Award and four of her books have been nominated for Romantic Times Reviewers' Choice. One of her novels, One Special Moment, won the Reviewers' Choice Award in 1998 for Best Multicultural Romance. She received twelve nominations at the Romance Slam Jam 2001's first annual Emma Awards, which recognize excellence in African-American literature. Jackson won in six of her categories, Favorite Hero, Favorite Author, Favorite Book of the Year, Favorite Sequel Continuing Book Series, Favorite Anthologies, and Favorite All-Nighter. The same year she also won the Romance In Color Award of Excellence for her novel Secret Love.

Jackson is a member of the First Coast Chapter of Romance Writers of America. She retired after 37 years in management for a major insurance company.

Jackson has added film-maker to her list of superlatives when in 2011, as an Executive Producer, she released a movie based on her novella, "Truly Everlasting." This movie is based on her beloved Madaris Series novel. Partnering with her son, Gerald Jackson, Jr.'s film company - Five Alive Films, she released the movie, Truly Everlasting, to DVD in November 2011. The movie also included a soundtrack of 10 original songs by BreMaDa Productions, as well as the reissuance of a commemorative edition of the novel, Truly Everlasting. The movie was filmed in Jacksonville, Florida.

== Bibliography ==
=== The Madaris Family and Friends series (1995–) ===
- Tonight and Forever - September, 1995 (Madaris Family & Friends)
- A Valentine Kiss Anthology - Cupid’s Bow - February, 1996
- Whispered Promises – August, 1996 (Madaris Family & Friends)
- Eternally Yours - October, 1997
- One Special Moment - May 1998
- Fire and Desire - August, 1999
- Something to Celebrate Anthology (Truly Everlasting) - December 1999
- Secret Love - January, 2000
- True Love - September, 2000
- Surrender – July 2000
- The Best Man Anthology - Strictly Business – February, 2003
- The Midnight Hour – April, 2004
- The Madaris Saga – BET's Anniversary Collector's Edition, November 2004. This 3-books-in-1 collection contains Tonight and Forever, Whispered Promises and Eternally Yours
- Unfinished Business –April, 2005
- Slow Burn (A Madaris Novel) - November 2007
- A Taste of Passion (Luke Madaris) – June 2009
- Sensual Confessions (Blade Madaris) – April 2010
- Inseparable (Reese Madaris) May 2011
- Courting Justice (New Madaris novel featuring Peyton Mahoney & DeAngelo DiMeglio, friends of the Madaris Family) June 2012
- Dreams of Forever (2-in-1 reissue featuring Seduction Westmoreland Style and Spencer's Forbidden Passion) July 2012
- All He Desires (Collection of special Brenda Jackson stories from Madaris Publishing; includes reissues from the Big Girl Series + 1 brand new story) September 2012
- A Very Merry Romance (Madaris Series) (Volume 21) November 2017
- Best Laid Plans (Madaris Family Saga) February 2018

=== The Steele series (2006–) ===
- Solid Soul (A Steele Novel) July 2006
- Night Heat (A Steele Novel) September 2006
- Beyond Temptation (A Steele Novel) - January 2007
- Risky Pleasures (A Steele Novel) - April 2007
- Irresistible Forces (Taylor Steele) – May 2008
- Quade's Babies (Quade Westmoreland & Cheyenne Steele) – December 2008
- Intimate Seduction (Donovan Steele) – July 2009
- Hidden Pleasures (Galen Steele) – June 2010
- A Steele for Christmas (Eli Steele) – October 2011
- Private Arrangements (New Steele book featuring Jonas Steele) February 2012
- Possessed by Passion (Tyson Steele) March 2016
- Guilty Pleasure: A Steele Family and Friends Novel (Steele Family Series) (Volume 13) May 2017

=== The Westmoreland series (2002–) ===
- Delaney's Desert Sheikh - November 2002
- A Little Dare - September, 2003
- Thorn’s Challenge – December, 2003
- Stone Cold Surrender – August 2004
- Riding The Storm – December, 2004
- Jared’s Counterfeit Fiancée, May 2005
- The Chase Is On, November, 2005
- The Durango Affair, May 2006
- Ian’s Ultimate Gamble, August 2006
- Seduction, Westmoreland Style (A Westmoreland Novel) February 2007
- Spencer's Forbidden Passion (A Westmoreland Novel) December 2007
- Taming Clint Westmoreland (Clint Westmoreland) – February 2008
- Cole's Red-Hot Pursuit (Cole Westmoreland) – June 2008
- Tall, Dark…Westmoreland (Reggie Westmoreland & Olivia Jeffries ) & (Book #1 of The Jeffries Family Series) – March 2009
- Westmoreland's Way (Dillon Westmoreland) November 2009
- Tis The Season …for Romance – Collection of 4-Brand New Stories including Uncle Corey Westmoreland's story – December 2009
- Wrapped In Pleasure – 2-in-1 Books; Reprint of Delaney's Desert Sheikh (1st Westmoreland Series Book) + New Madaris Series Book (Sheikh Rasheed Valdemon), Seduced by A Stranger – January 2010
- Hot Westmoreland Nights (Ramsey Westmoreland) – March 2010
- What A Westmoreland Wants (Gemma Westmoreland) – September 2010
- A Wife For A Westmoreland (Derringer Westmoreland) – April 2011
- The Proposal (Jason Westmoreland) June 2011
- Feeling the Heat (Micah Westmoreland) April 2012
- Texas Wild (Megan Westmoreland & Rico Claiborne) October 2012
- One Winter's Night (Riley Westmoreland) December 2012

=== The Westmoreland Legacy series ===
- The Rancher Returns (Gavin “Viper” Blake ) October 2016
- His Secret Son (Laramie “Coop” Cooper) November 2017
- An Honourable Seduction (The Westmoreland Legacy Ministries) May 2018

=== The Granger series ===
- A Brother’s Honor (Jace Granger) June 2013
- A Man's Promise (The Grangers) (Volume 2) October 2014
- A Lover’s Vow (Dalton Granger) April 2015
- Captivated by Love (The Grangers) (Volume 4) December 2016

=== The Protectors series (continuation of The Granger series) ===
- Forged in Desire (Lamar “Striker” Jennings) January 2017
- Seized by Seduction (Quasar Patterson) April 2017
- Locked in Temptation (Stonewall Courson) July 2017

=== Other titles ===
- Welcome to Leo's Anthology (Main Agenda) - November, 2000
- Family Reunion – November, 2001
- Perfect Timing – May, 2002
- Perfect Fit - May 2003
- Ties That Bind - November 2002
- A Lover’s Touch – (an e-Harlequin on-line read) – October 2002
- The Living Large Anthology - Bare Essentials – January, 2003
- The Savvy Sistahs – November, 2003
- A Whole Lotta Love – January 2004
- Scandal Between the Sheets - April, 2004
- Let’s Get It On –The Playa's Handbook – November, 2004
- Big Girls Don’t Cry – January, 2005
- The All Night Man – February, 2005
- Strictly-Confidential Attraction – September 2005
- When You Least Expect It, September 2005
- No More Playas, October 2005
- Mr. Satisfaction, January 2006
- Taking Care of Business, February 2006
- Never Too Late – May, 2006 (e-Harlequin on-line read)
- What A Woman Wants - January 2007
- In Bed with Her Boss - August 2007
- Stranded with the Tempting Stranger - October 2007
- Forever Mine Anthology (Includes Cupid's Bow + 2 new stories, The Sweetest Taboo & Perfect Moments) – February 2008
- Her Little Black Book – April 2008
- Just Desserts – (Part of a 3-book Continuity Series, The Three Mrs. Fosters), July 2008
- Winning The Race – NASCAR Holiday 3 – November 2008
- The Object of His Protection – (Part of a 4-book Continuity Series, The Braddock's Secret Son) November 2008
- Essence of Desire Anthology (Includes: Truly Everlasting + 2 new stories, The Makeover & Bound by Passion) – January 2009
- Temperatures Rising – (Part of a 3-Book Continuity Series, Mother Nature Matchmaker) & (Book #2 of The Jeffries Family Series) May 2009
- Some Like It Hot Special Collector's 5-books-In-1 (Includes: Strictly Business/The Best Man; Main Agenda/Welcome To Leo's; Irresistible Attraction/Let's Get It On; The Hunter/The All Night Man & Extreme Satisfaction/Mr. Satisfaction – October 2008
- One Night With A Wealthy Rancher – August 2009
- Bachelor Untamed (Bachelor In Demand Series Book 1 - Uriel Lassiter's story) – October 2009
- Spontaneous – (Jefferies Family Series #3) May 2010; Reprint November 2011 w/ Temptation
- In Too Deep (Part of 3-Books w/2-Novels-In-1 Continuity Series A Summer for Scandal) July 2010
- Star of His Heart (Part of a 4-Book Continuity Series, Love In The Limelight) – August 2010
- Bachelor Unleashed (#2 Bachelor In Demand Series - Xavier Kane's story) – December 2010
- A Silken Thread – March 2011 (NAACP IMAGE AWARD NOMINEE)
- In The Doctor's Bed (Part of a 4-Book Continuity Series, Hopewell General), August 2011
- Temptation (Part of the Texas Cattleman's Club Continuity Series: The Showdown ) 2-in-1 includes Reprint of Spontaneous – November 2011
- Bachelor Undone (Book #3 Bachelor In Demand Series - York Ellis) December 2011
- Promises of Seduction (2-in-1 reissue – featuring Durango Affair and Ian's Ultimate Gamble) January 2012
- Love Bites (anthology with Lori Foster, Catherine Mann, Jules Bennett and Virna DePaul - May 2012
- Bachelor Undone August 2013

== See also ==
List of romantic novelists
