= Melodrama (Daumier) =

Painting by Honoré Daumier

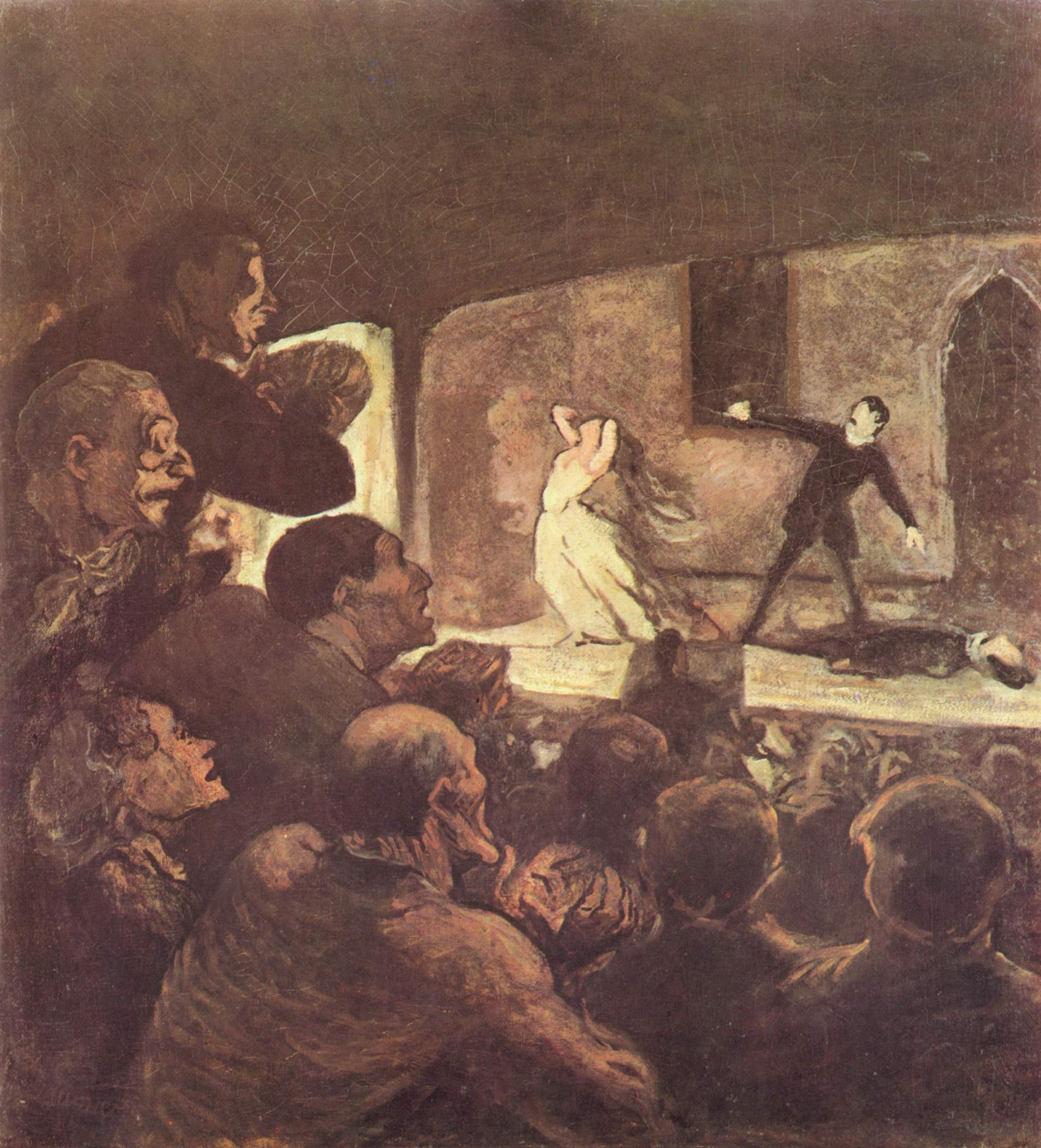
- Artist: Honoré Daumier
- Year: c. 1860
- Medium: oil on canvas
- Dimensions: 97.5 cm × 90.4 cm (38.4 in × 35.6 in)
- Location: Neue Pinakothek, Munich

Melodrama is an oil-on-canvas painting by the French artist Honoré Daumier. It is dated of c. 1860. It is held in the Neue Pinakothek in Munich.

== Description ==
Daumier was a great theater lover and is considered the first painter to have depicted this spectacle in painting, even before Edgar Degas and Henri de Toulouse-Lautrec. In this work, he wants to depict, more than the scene taking place in the stage, the reaction of the public who watches it. The viewers appear excited, tense, seemingly unable to distinguish reality from fiction.

The scene from the play, probably a romantic drama, shows a male assassin pointing a dead man that he killed to a woman, dressed in white, while she melodramatically tears her hair out. The scene, strongly illuminated by footlight, in an intense chiaroscuro contrasts sharply with the compact and dark mass formed by the audience in the theater, where some profiled silhouettes appear and some faces can be distinguished, illuminated by a phantasmagorical light.
