= Sandra Kitt =

American novelist

- Born: New York City, U.S.
- Education: City College of New York
- Occupation: Novelist
- Writing career
- Period: 1984–present
- Genre: Romance
- Website: www.sandrakitt.com

Sandra Kitt is an African-American author of contemporary romance novels. Her works have frequently made it to Essence magazine's "Black Board" bestseller lists.

== Early years ==
Sandra Kitt was born in New York City as the eldest of four children. Her dream was to illustrate children's books. After graduating from the Music and Art High School in New York, she earned a bachelor's degree in fine arts from City College of New York. During college she worked part-time at the astronomy library at the American Museum of Natural History in New York.

== Career ==
Following her graduation, she spent several years working at a small advertising agency before returning to CUNY to pursue a master's degree. After completing half of the work required by her master's program, Kitt left school to become the head librarian at the astronomy library where she had previously worked.

Although Kitt was comfortable with the job of cataloging the collection, she enrolled in classes at the Hayden Planetarium to learn more about astronomy so that she would be better at her job. Through these classes she met many guest speakers such as Carl Sagan and Isaac Asimov. In 1986, Asimov asked Kitt to illustrate a book he was writing on Halley's Comet.

== Writing career ==
Kitt began writing in the early 1980s for her own enjoyment. In six weeks, she had transformed her first idea into a 500-page manuscript. She continued to work on her ideas, finishing two additional manuscripts in the next year and a half. Shortly after finishing her third story, Kitt read an article in The New York Times about an editor who was beginning a new line of books for Harlequin. Kitt called the editor, who requested two of Kitt's novels. Within a week, the editor had purchased both books, Adam and Eva and Rites of Spring. In 1984 all three of her novels were published, making Kitt the first black author to write for Harlequin.

In 1995, Kitt emerged from the romance genre with her first mainstream novel, The Color of Love. The novel has been analyzed in scholarship for its treatment of interracial romance and the social and political expectations surrounding Black marriage. This book has twice been optioned for film, once by HBO, and had nine printings by 2002.

Her novels featured African-American characters, who rarely appeared in the gothic romances which she enjoyed reading. Kitt was one of the first authors within women's fiction to write from both the female and male point of view. Unafraid to tackle social issues in her works, Kitt has used her novels to study surrogate motherhood, abandoned children, race relations, and interracial/class differences. She has also often tackled interracial relationships.

Kitt has been able to use her fine arts degree to illustrate one of her novels. In 1993 she designed and painted the cover that was eventually used for her novel Love Everlasting.

In 2000, Kitt was nominated for an NAACP Image Award for contributing a story to the anthology Girlfriends. Kitt has been nominated three times for Romantic Times Reviewer's Choice Awards. She is a recipient of their Career Achievement Award.

In 2003, Kitt retired from her job as a museum librarian. However, she remained active in the Special Libraries Association.

In addition to her writing, Kitt teaches a publishing and creative writing course at a college. She has also written two film scripts and has interned with ABC for daytime soap operas.

== Works ==
=== Novels ===
- Rites of Spring (1984)
- All Good Things (1984)
- Adam and Eva (1984)
- Perfect Combination (1985)
- Only With the Heart (1985)
- With Open Arms (1986)
- An Innocent Man (1988)
- This Way Home (1989)
- Someone's Baby (1991)
- Love Everlasting (1993)
- Serenade (1994)
- Sincerely (1995)
- The Color of Love (1995)
- Suddenly (1996)
- Significant Others (1996)
- Between Friends (1998)
- Family Affairs (1999)
- Homecoming (1999)
- Close Encounters (2000)
- She's the One (2001)
- Southern Comfort (2004)
- The Next Best Thing (2005)
- Celluloid Memories (2007)
- For All We Know (2008)
- RSVP with Love (2009)
- Promises in Paradise (2010)
- Winner Takes All (2021)
- The Time of Your Life (2023)

=== Omnibus ===
- For the Love of Chocolate (1996) (with Margaret Brownley, Raine Cantrell, Nadine Crenshaw)
- Baby Beat (1996) (with Sandra Canfield, Marisa Carroll)
- Sisters (1996) (with Anita Bunkley and Eva Rutland)
- Girlfriends (1999) (with Anita Bunkley and Eva Rutland)
- First Touch (2004) (with Francis Ray and Eboni Snoe)
- Have a Little Faith (2006) (with ReShonda Tate Billingsley, J D Mason and Jacquelin Thomas)
- Back in Your Arms (2006) (with Celeste O. Norfleet and Deidre Savoy)
- Cougar Tales (2009) (with Deidre Savoy and Evelyn Palfrey)

=== Non-fiction ===
- "Telling Tales Out of School" essay in North American Romance Writers (1999, ISBN 0810836041)

== See also ==
- List of romantic novelists
