= Eva Rutland =

American novelist

- Born: January 15, 1917; Atlanta, Georgia, U.S.
- Died: March 12, 2012 (aged 95); Sacramento, California, U.S.
- Resting place: Masonic Lawn Cemetery
- Education: Spelman College
- Occupation: Novelist
- Spouse: Bill Rutland
- Children: 4
- Writing career
- Genre: Romance

Eva Rutland (January 15, 1917 – March 12, 2012) was an author of more than 20 romance novels. She was the author When We Were Colored: A Mother’s Story and, No Crystal Stair and is the winner of the 2000 Golden Pen Award for Lifetime Achievement.

== Early life and education ==
Born in Atlanta, Georgia in 1917, Rutland was the granddaughter of a former slave who sent all of his children through college. Rutland's mother was a school teacher; her father a pharmacist.

She attended segregated schools her entire life and graduated from Spelman College in 1937.

== Author ==
Eva Rutland published her first memoir in 1964 (The Trouble With Being Mama: A Negro Mother on the Anxieties and Joys of Bringing Up a Family). The book, updated and republished in 2007 as When We Were Colored: A Mother’s Story, chronicles the lives of an ordinary yet extraordinary "colored" family as they move from segregation to integration during the turbulent civil rights era of the 1950s and 60s.

In the 1950s, Rutland realized that she was going blind. "When you get incapacitated, and you can't see or can't move around as you should, then you're kind of at a loss," she says. "So you have to find something to do, and I think that's when I found my writing." Rutland already sold writing to Redbook and other magazines. In 1964, she published a family memoir as a kind of antidote to the public fear about change and race — issues she was intimately familiar with as her own children attended newly integrated schools. In the book, The Trouble With Being a Mama, she wrote, "Integration in theory is a fine, high-sounding utopia. In reality, I shivered as I watched my children unknowingly shed the warm cloak of segregation."

She had been blind from macular degeneration throughout most of her career. Her first published romance was the Inspirational title A Report of Love in 1985. As an author for Harlequin Romance, Eva Rutland has published 18 books. Including other genres, Rutland has published more than 20 books.

No Crystal Stair, Eva Rutland's first mainstream novel, chronicles six decades of American history through the experiences of Ann Elizabeth Carter Metcalf and her family. Rutland's semiautobiographical novel takes its title from a stanza in Langston Hughes' 1922 poem "Mother to Son." Both the poem and the novel carry messages of hope and perseverance in the face of life's disappointments. The book is a departure from Rutland's earlier works. The author, who occasionally includes African-American characters in her novels, has taken a frank, head-on look at racism. In addition, her use of language may surprise many familiar with her work.

== Personal life ==
She married Bill Rutland, a civilian with the Tuskegee Airmen. The Air Force moved Bill Rutland to Ohio, then Sacramento, California. He and Eva built a home, made new friends and raised four children.

Rutland died in Sacramento, California, on March 12, 2012, at the age of 95.

== Awards and honors ==
- Winner of the 2000 Golden Pen Award for Lifetime Achievement.

== Selected works ==
=== Romance novels ===
- To Love Them All – March 1988, Harlequin Romance #2897
- At First Sight – November 1988, Harlequin Romance #2944
- Matched Pair – May 1989, Harlequin Regency Romance #1
- Vicar's Daughter, The – February 1990, Harlequin Regency Romance #20
- Enterprising Lady – June 1990, Harlequin Regency Romance #28
- No Accounting For Love – July 1990, Harlequin Romance #3064
- Willful Lady, The – March 1991, Harlequin Regency Romance #45 and June 2001, Mills and Boon Historical Romance
- Always Christmas – December 1992, Harlequin Romance #3240
- Gretna Bride – January 1993, Harlequin Regency Romance #89
- Foreign Affair – October 1993, Harlequin Romance #3283
- Private Dancer – June 1996, Harlequin Romance #3412
- Marriage Bait – January 1997, Harlequin Romance #3439
- Child's Christmas, A – December 1997, Harlequin Superromance #769
- Wedding Trap, The – January 1998, Harlequin Romance #3490
- Million-Dollar Marriage, The – August 1998, Harlequin Romance #3518
- Her Own Prince Charming – April 1999, Harlequin Romance #3550
- Almost A Wife – September 2000, Harlequin Romance #3621
- Heart And Soul – February 2005, Harlequin Superromance #1255

=== Memoirs ===
- The Trouble With Being a Mama: A Negro Mother on the Anxieties and Joys of Bringing Up a Family- 1964
- When We Were Colored: A Mother’s Story - May 2007

=== Other fiction ===
- No Crystal Stair - February 2000
