= Crystal Lacey Winslow =

American novelist

- Occupation: Writer
- Writing career
- Genre: Fiction
- Notable works: Life, Love & Loneliness; The Criss Cross; Tale of a Train Wreck Lifestyle

Crystal Lacey Winslow is an American author, agent, and book publisher from Brooklyn, New York. She is the founder of Melodrama Publishing, an American independent publishing house based in East Patchogue, New York, that specializes in urban fiction novels geared toward women.

== Writing career and Melodrama Publishing ==
In 2001, Winslow founded Melodrama Publishing, a New York-based company, and self-financed her first novel, Life, Love & Loneliness, in June 2002. Within eight weeks that novel had independently sold out its first print run and was on the Essence Magazine bestseller list. Following the overall success of Life, Love & Loneliness, Winslow opened a bookstore in 2003 called Melodrama Books & Things in Far Rockaway, Queens. This was the town's first bookstore in decades.

In 2004 Simon & Schuster Pocket Books printed the first edition of Four Degrees of Heat with Brenda L. Thomas, Rochelle Alers, and ReShonda Tate Billingsley. Winslow’s second novel, The Criss Cross, and Kiki Swinson’s first novel, Wifey, were released by Melodrama Publishing that year.

Publications such as Black Enterprise, the New York Daily News, and Publishers Weekly covered Winslow’s accomplishments, and in 2005 Vibe.com referred to her as "Melodrama's Queen Pen".

In 2008 Winslow ghostwrote Cartier Cartel by Nisa Santiago, and that novel launched a series of lawsuits, with Winslow and Melodrama Publishing on the defense. Throughout five years of legal battles, Winslow remained silent, choosing to not comment or defend her position through social media. Melodrama was eventually vindicated in all legal matters.

Moving forward, Melodrama Publishing launched its Brooklyn Books imprint in 2014.

== Winslow Shim Literary Agency ==
In 2007, Winslow started the Winslow Shim Literary Agency. Since creating the company, Winslow has brokered book deals for clients with major and independent publishing houses.

== Works ==
- Life, Love & Loneliness. Melodrama Publishing. June 2002. ISBN 978-0971702103.
- Four Degrees of Heat: A Collection of Sexy Summer Escapades. Gallery Books. July 2004. ISBN 0743491459.
- The Criss Cross. Melodrama Publishing. August 2004. ISBN 978-0971702127.
- Kiss the Year Goodbye. Pocket. January 2005. ISBN 0451209141.
- Sex, Sin & Brooklyn. Melodrama Publishing. October 2006. ISBN 978-0971702165.
- Histress. Melodrama Publishing. December 2007. ISBN 978-1934157039.
- Tale of a Train Wreck Lifestyle. Melodrama Publishing. October 2008. ISBN 978-1934157152.
- Menace. Melodrama Publishing. March 2009. ISBN 978-1934157169.
