= Kayla Perrin =

Jamaican-born Canadian author

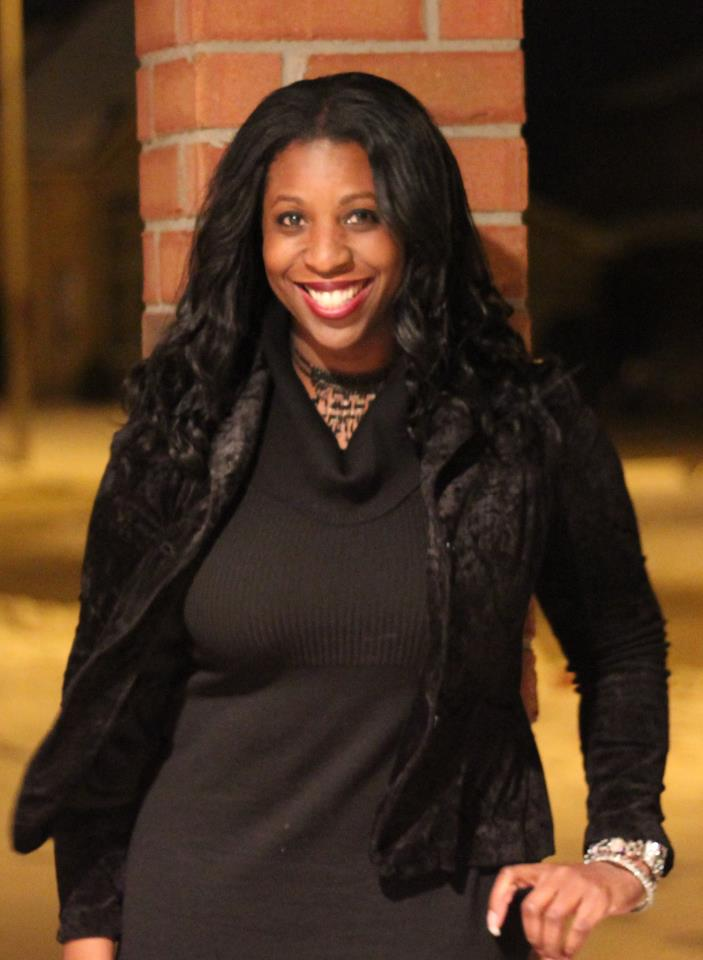
Kayla Perrin

Kayla Perrin (possibly born in 1973) is a Jamaican-born Canadian author and actor who has written romance novels, children's books, and suspense novels. "She has received an Arts Acclaim Award for her writing from the city of Brampton, Ontario." Perrin received the Harry Jerome Award for excellence in the arts in 2011. She was featured in the documentary Who's Afraid of Happy Endings.

== Selected bibliography ==
- Heart to Heats (2012)
- Island Love Songs (2013)
- Until Now (2013)
- Playing with Fire (2013)
- What's Done in Darkness (2015)
