= Beverly Jenkins =

American novelist

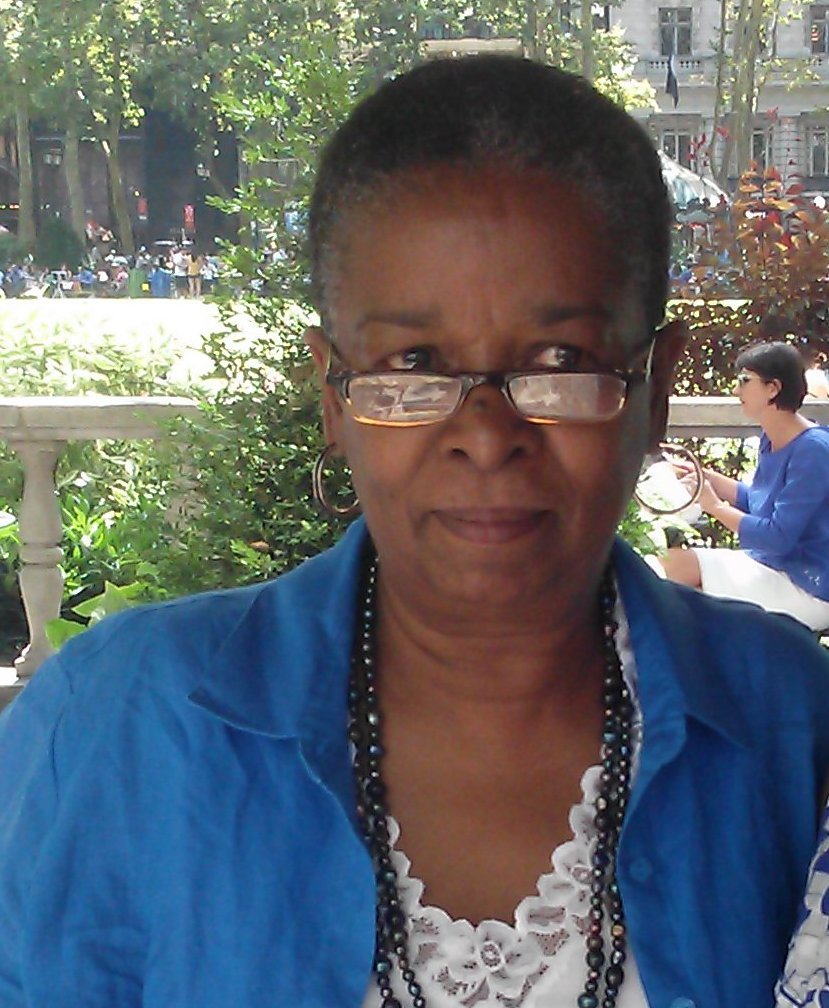
- Born: 1951 (age 74–75); Detroit, Michigan, U.S.
- Education: Michigan State University
- Occupation: Novelist
- Writing career
- Period: 1994–present
- Genres: Historical romance, contemporary romance
- Notable awards: RWA Nora Roberts Lifetime Achievement Award; 2017
- Website: www.beverlyjenkins.net

Beverly Jenkins (born 1951, Detroit) is an American author of historical and contemporary romance novels with a particular focus on 19th-century African American life. She was a 2013 NAACP Image Award nominee and, in 1999, was voted one of the Top 50 Favorite African American writers of the 20th century by the African American Literature Book Club. Jenkins's historical romances are set during a period of African American history that she believes is often overlooked. This made it difficult to break into publishing, because publishers weren't sure what to do with stories that involved African Americans but not slavery.

Jenkins studied at Michigan State University as a Journalism and English Literature major. She lives in Southeastern Michigan.

== Early life ==
Jenkins was born in Detroit in 1951 to her parents, a high school teacher and an administrative aide. She grew up surrounded by words. Her mother read to Jenkins while she was in the womb, and bought her cloth books when she was a baby. Jenkins would chew on the cloth books while her mother encouraged her to "Eat those words, baby. Eat those words." She read widely at her local library, everything from Alice in Wonderland to Dune to Zane Grey, to early romance writers like Victoria Holt, Mary Stewart and Phyllis A. Whitney. Her early writing began when she became the editor of her elementary school newspaper.

Jenkins attended Michigan State University in the spring of 1969.

== Career ==
Jenkins worked full-time in the Michigan State University library's circulation department. Each lunch hour, she would read articles from The Journal of Negro History (now called The Journal of African American History).

Eventually, she and her husband moved to Ypsilanti, where she worked at the Parke Davis Pharmaceuticals' reference desk and began writing romance novels for fun. At the suggestion of a colleague, she looked for an agent and publisher, and sent her manuscript to Vivian Stephens, who agreed to represent her. Avon published her first novel, Night Song, in 1994.

Though Jenkins has published books in many romance sub-genres, the majority of her books are historical romances. She calls herself a "kitchen table historian." She likens American history to a quilt with some pieces ripped out—the pieces belonging to minority history. Jenkins uses her books to weave the quilt back together by revealing patches of black history that are rarely taught in school. Slavery and the Civil Rights Movement are important pieces of African American history, but they are not the only pieces. Jenkin's first three novels, Night Song, Vivid and Indigo, feature a schoolteacher, a cavalry officer, a female doctor and Underground Railroad heroes. They were all inspired by true history.

Jenkins found inspiration for Forbidden from two interesting bits of history. She read a news article about a high-end African American-run hotel that was uncovered during an archaeological dig in Virginia City. She also heard a story about a man seeing a black woman walking through the desert with a cook stove balanced on her head.

Jenkins includes bibliographies with her historical romances so readers can read further, if they choose.

== Bibliography ==
| Title | Series | Publication year | ISBN |
|---|---|---|---|
| Night Song | | 1994 | 9780380776580 |
| Vivid | Grayson Family No. 1 | 1995 | 9780595162024 |
| Indigo | | 1996 | 9780595002023 |
| Topaz | | 1997 | 9780380786602 |
| Through the Storm | LeVeq Family No. 1 | 1998 | 9780380798643 |
| The Taming of Jessi Rose | | 1999 | 9780380798650 |
| Always and Forever | | 2000 | 9780380813742 |
| Before the Dawn | | 2001 | 9780380813759 |
| A Chance at Love | | 2002 | 9780060502294 |
| Belle and the Beau | | 2002 | 9780064473422 |
| "Homecoming" short story in Gettin' Merry anthology | | 2002 | 9780312982195 |
| The Edge of Midnight | | 2004 | 9780060540661 |
| Winds of the Storm | LeVeq Family No. 2 | 2006 | 9780060575311 |
| The Edge of Dawn | | 2004 | 9780060540678 |
| Something like Love | | 2005 | 9780060575328 |
| Black Lace | | 2005 | 9780060815936 |
| Sexy/Dangerous | | 2006 | 9780060818999 |
| Prisoner of Love | | 2007 | 9781625172761 |
| Deadly Sexy | | 2007 | 9780061246395 |
| "Prisoner" short story in Cuffed by Candlelight anthology | | 2007 | 9781600430077 |
| Wild Sweet Love | | 2007 | 9780061161308 |
| Jewel | Grayson Family No. 2 | 2008 | 9780061161353 |
| Josephine and the Soldier | | 2009 | 9780060012205 |
| Bring on the Blessings | Blessings No. 1 | 2009 | 9780061688409 |
| Captured | LeVeq Family No. 3 | 2009 | 9780061547799 |
| A Second Helping, | Blessings No. 2 | 2009 | 9780061547812 |
| "You Sang To Me" short story in Rhythms of Love anthology | | 2010 | 9780373861606 |
| "Holiday Heat" short story in Once Upon a Holiday anthology | | 2010 | 9780373831913 |
| Midnight | | 2010 | 9780061547805 |
| "I'll Be Home for Christmas" short story in Baby, Let It Snow anthology | | 2011 | 9780373862337 |
| Something Old, Something New | Blessings No. 3 | 2011 | 9780061990793 |
| Night Hawk | | 2011 | 9780062032645 |
| "Hawaii Magic" short story in Island for Two anthology | | 2012 | 9780373862610 |
| "Overtime Love" short story in Merry Sexy Christmas anthology | | 2012 | 9780373534876 |
| Wish and a Prayer, A | Blessings No. 4 | 2012 | 9780061990809 |
| Destiny's Embrace | Destiny No. 1 | 2013 | 9780062032652 |
| Destiny's Surrender | Destiny No. 2 | 2013 | 9780062231116 |
| Heart of Gold | Blessings No. 5 | 2014 | 9780062207975 |
| Destiny's Captive | Destiny No. 3 | 2014 | 9780062231130 |
| For Your Love | Blessings No. 6 | 2015 | 9780062207999 |
| Forbidden | Old West No. 1 | 2016 | 9780062389008 |
| Stepping to a New Day | Blessings No. 7 | 2016 | 9780062412638 |
| Breathless | Old West No. 2 | 2017 | 9780062389039 |
| Chasing Down a Dream | Blessings No. 8 | 2017 | 9780062412652 |
| Tempest | Old West No. 3 | 2018 | 9780062389053 |
| Second Time Sweeter | Blessings No. 9 | 2018 | 9780062846174 |
| Rebel | Women Who Dare No. 1 | 2019 | 9780062861689 |
| On the Corner of Hope and Main | Blessings No. 10 | 2020 | 9780062699282 |
| Wild Rain | Women Who Dare No. 2 | 2021 | 9780062861719 |
| To Catch a Raven | Women Who Dare No. 3 | 2022 | 9780062861740 |
| A Christmas to Remember | Blessings No. 11 | 2023 | 9780063119253 |
| Calling All Blessings | Blessings No. 12 | 2025 | 9780063018266 |

== Awards ==
- 1996 – Romantic Times Historical Love and Laughter nominee
- 1999 – Romantic Times Western Historical Romance winner
- 2000 – Romantic Times Multicultural Romance winner
- 2007 – Romantic Times Historical Storyteller of the Year nominee
- 2010 – A Second Helping – Romantic Times Multicultural Fiction Novel winner
- 2011 – Something Old, Something New – Romantic Times Multicultural Romance winner
- 2013 – Destiny's Embrace – Romantic Times American-Set Historical Romance winner
- 2013 – A Wish and a Prayer – NAACP Image Award for Literature nominee
- 2016 – Forbidden – Romantic Times Historical Romance winner
- 2017 – RWA Nora Roberts Lifetime Achievement Award
