= Kimani Press =

Canadian publisher

Kimani Press was formed by Harlequin Enterprises, Ltd. in December 2005, with the purchase of the Arabesque, Sepia, and New Spirit Imprints from BET Books. Arabesque was the first line of original African-American romance novels from a major publishing house, and published two single-titles each month until it ceased publication in February 2015. The Sepia imprint featured commercial women’s fiction, and New Spirit served the growing African-American inspirational marketplace with both fiction and non-fiction releases.

In July 2006, Harlequin launched Kimani Romance, an African-American series imprint that published four new releases each month. In May 2017, it was announced that Harlequin was no longer acquiring titles for the Kimani Romance imprint, with the final titles due to be released in 2018.

In February 2007, Kimani TRU was launched targeting a young-adult, multi-cultural audience with one new release each month. This line ceased publication in October 2014.

Since 2005, Kimani Press novels have been available in eBook format, a portable downloaded alternative to the standard paperback.

== Kimani Press imprints ==
The name 'KIMANI' is of Kikuyu Origin.

Arabesque: The leading line of African-American romances. An-award-winning imprint of traditional and contemporary romance novels written by African-American authors. The last title was released in February 2015.

Kimani Romance: Series romance. The last title was released in 2018.

Kimani Tru: Young-adult fiction featuring African-American youth. The last title was released in October 2014.

Kimani Press Special Releases : Special Releases from favorite Kimani Press authors. The last title was released in January 2015.

== Impact ==
Harlequin Enterprises' Kimani Press lines gave African-American authors the ability to publish their stories, whether they had an agent or not at the time of proposing their stories. At the time of opening Kimani Press imprints, Harlequin Enterprises' prided themselves on their search for diverse stories so that marginalized voices could gain traction and meet readers' demands for nonwhite stories and authors.

== Reception ==
There were varied views on both the opening and closing of Kimani Press imprints. During publication, some were divides as to whether or not romance books should be divided based on race. There were some Kimani authors who appreciated having imprints dedicated to representing Back authors, whereas others found it problematic, as they believed wider audiences would not encounter diverse romance books if they were in a different section of bookstores.

During the closing of the imprints, some authors from the Kimani Press were able to continue working under Harlequin Enterprises, while others were simply notified that the lines were closing. There was also belief that Kimani Press wasn't advertised a well as they could have been via Harlequin Enterprises' social media campaigns.
