= Vivian Stephens =

American editor, literary agent, founder of Romance Writers of America

Vivian Lorraine Stephens
- Born: 1932 (age 92–93); Houston, Texas
- Occupation(s): Editor, literary agent
- Known for: Founder of Romance Writers of America

Vivian Lorraine Stephens (born September 23, 1932) is an American editor of romance novels, literary agent, and founder of Romance Writers of America (RWA). While at Dell Publishing, she created and was the editor of Candlelight Ecstasy, a romance line that revolutionized the genre in the 1980s. In 1980, as part of the Candlelight Romance line, she published Entwined Destinies by Rosalind Welles, the first category romance novel by an African-American author to feature African-American main characters. "A Black editor in a predominantly white industry, Stephens sought to incorporate the voices of women of color into the burgeoning romance industry." Over the course of her career, Stephens helped launch Sandra Kitt, Jayne Ann Krentz, and Beverly Jenkins, among others.

== Early life ==
Stephens was born September 23, 1932, in Houston, Texas, the daughter of Adolphus and Oveta Lavern Stephens. Stephens graduated from Texas Southern University in 1955 with a degree in Home Economics, Clothing, and Textiles before moving to the New York City Area.

== Career ==
Stephens was an editor for Harlequin, Dell (Candlelight Romances), and Bantam. She also established Women Writers of Color, an organization aiming to support African-American commercial fiction writers featuring characters of color.

Stephens started her career as a researcher at Time-Life Books, but in October 1978, she was named Associate Editor for the Candlelight Romance line at Dell Publishing, before moving up to Editor-in-Chief of the line eight months later. Because of the dominance of Harlequin at the time, the Candlelight line was simply a way for Dell to keep a presence in the market, and so it became a place for the company to place inexperienced staffers like Stephens Because of Dell's hands-off attitude, Stephens had wide latitude with the Candlelight books, which were so-called “sweet” contemporary romances similar to the Harlequin Romance line.

While Avon had changed the market in the 1970s with their sensual single-title historical romances, the category romances were dominated by Harlequin and Silhouette lines of contemporary sweet romances. In an interview printed in John Markert's book Publishing Romance, Stephens talks about visiting drugstores and other places where Candlelight Romances were sold in order to observe romance consumers in action. Her observations and conversations with consumers led her to believe that romance readers were ready for older, more experienced female characters, as well as increased levels of sensuality compared to what was in other category romance lines of the time. She tested her theory by publishing Morning Rose, Evening Savage by author Joan Hohl under then pen name Amii Lorin, which had been rejected by Harlequin, as part of the Candlelight line in August 1980.

When no negative reactions were forthcoming, Stephens pitched the idea of a new line called Candlelight Ecstasy to Dell, citing it as a possible competitor to Harlequin Presents. Upper management greenlighted the endeavor and Stephens launched the line in December 1980 with two new manuscripts that fit her vision: one by Hohl writing as Amii Loren, The Tawny Gold Man, and another from Jayne Castle, Gentle Pirate. "This latter...surpassed the merely sensual and ultimately liberated the romance novel." It sold out in weeks and the Ecstasy line took off, its offerings selling out at bookstores and eventually replacing the previous line.

"Romance aficionados and industry sources credit Dell's Candlelight Ecstasy line with changing the content of the romance novel in the 1980s, much as Avon is credited with initiating changes that affected the content of romance novels in the 1970s."

With Stephens at the helm, Candlelight also published romances by authors of color, "creating almost single-handedly the category that trade publications called 'Ethnic Romance'." Apparently due to a reluctance from Dell to publish the romances from authors of color that Stephens had acquired, Stephens left Dell in late 1981 to become editorial director of Harlequin Books and launched the Harlequin American line to compete with Dell's Candlelight Ecstasy line.

She was also charged with setting up Harlequin's New York offices, in a space shared with recently acquired Silhouette Romance. Stephens left Harlequin shortly after the American line launched in 1983.

Subsequently, she worked as a literary agent, representing Beverly Jenkins among others.

=== "Ethnic Romance" ===
Prior to Stephens’ arrival at Dell, no category romance novels from any publisher had featured African-American protagonists. This changed in 1980 with Candlelight Romance number 575, Entwined Destinies by Rosalind Welles. Welles was the pen name of Newsweek writer Elsie B. Washington, a friend of Stephens. The novel sold more than 40,000 copies of its original run. People Magazine began its review of the book by saying “The desegregation of the paperback romance novel arrives”. As part of the marketing campaign, the book was referred to as an "ethnic romance".

After Entwined Destinies, Stephens saw the launch of Candlelight Ecstasy as an opportunity to introduce stories about women and men of different ethnic backgrounds. Stephens sought out Latina, Black, Asian American, and Native American authors to create stories about people like themselves. Three books by this pool of authors were published by Candlelight Ecstasy: Web of Desire by Jean Hager; Golden Fire, Silver Ice by Marisa De Zavala; and The Tender Mending by Lia Sanders.

When she moved to Harlequin in 1982, Stephens continued her efforts to publish non-white authors, acquiring manuscripts from authors such as Sandra Kitt. Kitt's Adam and Eva (1984) would later become the first Harlequin title in any of its lines to be written by an African-American author and feature African-American main characters.

=== Romance Writers of America ===
Stephens is credited as the founder of the Romance Writers of America. A group of romance writers approached Stephens after the Southwestern Writers Conference in 1979, looking for advice on dealing with editors and publishers as they tried to break into the business. Stephens told them to form their own conference and offered to provide advice during the process. Stephens was present for the group's first meeting, at the San Jacinto Savings and Loan in Houston on December 15, 1980, where they selected a founding Board of Directors and began the process of planning their first conference Stephens secured financial backing from Dell and invited other editors to their first conference in 1981.

== Legacy ==
In 1991, The Romance Writers of America established the Vivian Stephens Industry Award, which "is presented to one or more professionals in the romance-publishing industry, who is not a writer, who has contributed to the genre or to RWA in a significant and/or continuing manner."

In May 2020, The Romance Writers of America announced that it would be changing the name of its annual awards, formerly known as "The RITA", to "The Vivian" in honor of Stephens.

In July 2020, author Sarah MacLean, critic Jen Prokop, and Bowling Green State University archivist Steve Ammidown discussed Stephens' legacy on the Fated Mates podcast. In September 2020, Stephens appeared on the Black Romance Podcast with host Julie Moody-Freeman to discuss her own legacy in a two part interview
