= Adrianne Byrd =

African-American author

- Born: Adrianne Janette Byrd; November 23, 1970; Memphis, Tennessee, U.S.
- Died: October 30, 2020 (aged 49)
- Occupation: Author
- Writing career
- Pen name: De'nesha Diamond; Layla Jordan; A.J. Byrd

Adrianne Janette Byrd (November 23, 1970 – October 30, 2020) was a best-selling African-American author of more than 50 romance novels. Her most widely held book, The Beautiful Ones, is in more than 400 WorldCat libraries.

== Biography ==
Byrd was born in Memphis, Tennessee, into a military family. She traveled throughout Europe as a child. Byrd's older brother introduced her to romance novels when she was thirteen years of age, and she developed an interest in fiction writing.

== Career ==
In 1994, a co-worker introduced Byrd to an article on the Romance Writers of America. By 1996, she sold her first novel, Defenseless, to Kensington Publishing. In 2006, she co-wrote the Hoodwives trilogy under the name De'nesha Diamond. Subsequently, she has written the bestselling (Hood) Divas series.

National publications, including Today's Black Woman, Upscale, and Heart and Soul have featured her work. She has won local awards for screenwriting as well.

In 2014, Byrd lived in Georgia, USA. She writes as De'nesha Diamond for the Hoodwives and Divas series. She has also written as Layla Jordan and A.J. Byrd.

== Novels ==
Measure of Man is a romantic comedy about a woman, Peyton Garner, who believes that her gay brother, Flex Adams, has found a new lover, Trey "Lincoln" Carver, after ending a ten-year relationship. Lincoln, however, is neither gay nor aware of who Flex is. When Peyton and Lincoln meet in New York, a relationship between the two develops. As Peyton's family gathers for a wedding, these misunderstandings begin to unfold.

My Destiny is romance novel about a woman named Destiny who has a distaste for her new neighbor, an attorney named Miles Stafford, who moved into the apartment across the hall. While Destiny observes his cocky behavior and his liking for women, she ultimately turns down his interest in her. However, when a power outage disrupts both of their lives, they are soon brought together and Destiny quickly realizes that she may have judged Miles too quickly. After becoming friends, they open their own law practice together. As they grow older, both Destiny and Miles seek out other romantic interests, but both can't seem to find the right person. Ten years past and Destiny finds Miles while she is intoxicated and shows a renewed interest in her previous lover.

== Awards ==
=== RT Awards ===
RT Awards are awarded by Romantic Times Magazine

- 2003 Comfort of A Man- Best Multicultural
- 2010 Heart's Secret-Best Multicultural
- 2011-A Christmas Affair- Best Kimani Romance

Emma Awards, awarded by Romance Slam Jam organization

- 2003- Comfort of a Man- Favorite Traditional Romance
- 2012- King's Passion- Best Romance Sequel

Romance in Color Reader's Choice Awards

- 2003- Comfort of a Man- Favorite Book
- 2003- Comfort of a Man- Favorite Hero
- 2003- Comfort of a Man- Favorite Heroine.

Shade's of Romance

- 2003- Comfort of a Man-Best Arabesque romance.

Bibliography:

- Defenseless (1997) Kensington/ Pinnacle.
- Man of the House-One in a Million (1998) Kensington/Pinnacle.
- Forget Me Not (1998) Kensington/ Pinnacle.
- I Promise (1999) Kensington/ Pinnacle
- Say You Love Me (2000) BET/ Arabesque.
- Love's Deception (2000) BET/ Arabesque.
- All I've Ever Wanted (2001) BET/ Arabesque.
- Surrender to Love (2002) BET/Arabesque.
- My Destiny (2003) BET/Arabesque
- Comfort of a Man (2003) BET/Arabesque
- Unforgettable (2004) BET/Arabesque
- If You Dare (2004)-Avon HarperCollins
- Measure of a Man (2005) BET/Arabesque
- The Beautiful Ones (2005) BET/ Arabesque
- Deadly Double (2005) BET/Arabesque
- Season of Miracle (2005) BET/Arabesque
- When You Were Mine (2006) BET/Arabesque
- She's My Baby (2006) Harlequin/ Kimani
- Takin' Chances for the Holidays-Finding the Right Key (2006)
- Harlequin/ Arabesque
- When Valentine's Collide-(2007) Harlequin/ Kimani
- Blue Skies (2007) Harlequin/ Arabesque
- Feel the Fire (2007) Harlequin/ Arabesque
- To Love A Stranger (2007) Harlequin/ Arabesque
- Two Grooms and a Wedding ( 2008) Harlequin/ Kimani
- Controversy (2008) Harlequin/ Arabesque
- Her Lover's Legacy (2008) Harlequin/ Kimani
- Sinful Chocolate (2009) Harlequin/ Kimani
- Love Takes Time (2009) Harlequin/ Arabesque
- Queen of Hearts (2009) Harlequin/ Arabesque
- Tender to his Touch (2009) Harlequin/ Arabesque
- Body Heat (2010) Harlequin/ Kimani
- Lover's Premiere (2010) Harlequin/ Kimani
- Once Upon a Holiday-Candy Christmas ( 2010) Harlequin/
- Arabesque
- My Only Desire (2011) Harlequin/ Kimani
- King's Passion (2011)-Harlequin/ Arabesque
- King's Promise (2011)- Harlequin/ Arabesque
- King's Pleasure (2011) Harlequin/ Arabesque
- A Christmas Affair (2011) Harlequin/ Kimani

As Denesha Diamond

- Desperate Hoodwives ( 2008) Simon and Schuster/ Touchtone
- Shameless Hoodwives (2008) Simon and Schuster/ Touchtone
- The Hood Life (2009) Simon and Schuster/ Touchtone
- Heartbreaker ( 2010) Kensington/ Dafina
- Hustlin' Divas (2010) Kensington/ Dafina
- Street Divas (2011) Kensington/ Dafina
- Gangsta Divas ( 2012) Kensington/ Dafina
- Boss Divas (2013) Kensington/ Dafina

As Layla Jordan

- The Liar's Club (2010) Kensington/ Dafina

As A.J. Byrd

- Chasing Romeo (2009) Harlequin/ Kimani Tru
- Losing Romeo (2010) Harlequin/ Kimani Tru According to WorldCat, the book is held in 274 libraries
