= Felicia Mason =

African-American novelist and journalist (born 1962)

Felicia Mason (born May 8, 1962) is an African-American novelist and journalist born in Aliquippa, Pennsylvania, United States. She is best known for writing in the romance genre. Her novel Rhapsody was adapted into a television movie in 2000.

== Biography ==
Mason grew up in Pennsylvania, but her family moved to Virginia when she was a child. Mason received her BA in mass media arts from the Hampton Institute in 1984 and her MA from Ohio State University. Before becoming a writer, she was a staff developmental editor for the Daily Press in Newport News. She currently lives in Yorktown, VA.

== Awards ==
Romantic Times and Affaire de Coeur were both awarded Reviewers Choice Awards for best contemporary ethnic novel in 1995. She was selected by readers as one of top 10 romance authors, 2002, for Body and Soul. In 2001 she was awarded the Emma Award for contribution to Della's House of Style. She was named best romance writer turned mainstream by Black Issues Book Review in 2002, for Testimony.

== Works ==
=== Romance novels ===
- For the Love of You (also see below), Bet Books (Washington, DC), 1994 ISBN 978-1583140888
- Body and Soul (also see below), Pinnacle Books (New York, NY), 1995 ISBN 978-0786001606
- Seduction (also see below), Kensington Books (New York, NY), 1996 ISBN 978-0786002979
- Rhapsody, Five Star (Unity, ME), 1998 ISBN 978-0786004041
- Foolish Heart, Pinnacle Books (New York, NY), 1998 ISBN 978-0786005932
- Forbidden Heart, Arabesque (Washington, DC), 2000 ISBN 978-1583140505
- Testimony, Dafina Books (New York, NY), 2002 ISBN 978-1617739538
- Sweet Accord, Steeple Hill Books (Buffalo, NY), 2003 ISBN 978-0373872046
- Sweet Harmony, Steeple Hill Books (Buffalo, NY), 2004 ISBN 978-0786269075
- Sweet Devotion, Steeple Hill Books (Buffalo, NY), 2004 ISBN 978-0786271108
- Enchanted Heart, Dafina (New York, NY), 2004 ISBN 978-0758205711
- Gabriel's Discovery, Love Inspired (Buffalo, NY), 2004 ISBN 978-0786281527
- Seductive Hearts (omnibus; contains For the Love of You, Body and Soul, and Seduction), Arabesque (Washington, DC), 2005 ISBN 978-1583146590
- Hidden Riches, Kensington/Dafina (New York, NY), 2014 ISBN 978-0758205735
- The Fireman Finds a Wife, Love Inspired (Buffalo, NY), 2014.

=== Anthologies ===
- A Valentine Kiss, Arabesque (Washington, DC), 1996
- Man of the House, Arabesque, 1998
- Something to Celebrate, Kensington Books (New York, NY), 1999
- Della's House of Style, St. Martin's Press (New York, NY), 2000
- Island Magic, 2000; How Sweet the Sound, Thorndike Press (Farmington Hills, MI), 2005
- Sing to My Heart, Harlequin (Toronto, Ontario, Canada), 2012
- Holiday Dream, Harlequin (Toronto, Ontario, Canada), 2012
- Valentine's Dream, Harlequin (Toronto, Ontario, Canada), 2013
- Love Inspired, Love Inspired (Buffalo, NY), 2014
- This Holiday Magic, Harlequin (New York, NY), 2014.
