= Francis Ray =

American novelist

- Born: July 20, 1944; Richland, Texas, U.S.
- Died: July 3, 2013 (aged 68)
- Education: Texas Woman's University
- Occupation: Novelist
- Website: francisray.com

Francis Ray (July 20, 1944 – July 3, 2013) was a New York Times and USA Today bestselling African-American writer of romance novels. Her literary fiction series – Taggart and Falcon, the Invincible Women, Grayson Family of New Mexico, and Grayson Friends – consistently made bestsellers' lists. She lived in Dallas, Texas.

== Biography ==
She was born in Richland, Texas, and studied nursing, receiving a bachelor's degree from Texas Woman's University in 1967. She began writing in 1987, while continuing to work as a nurse, and had her first book published in 1992. Ray was inspired to write after reading one of Kathleen Woodiwiss's books. She was also inspired by J. California Cooper's writings.

In 1995, she co-founded the Romance Slam Jam, which was an author-reader conference and first launched in Texas.

== Work ==
Ray's stories are character-driven and Ray spent time fleshing out full stories for the characters in her books, including their childhoods. She feels that writing romance is often more emotionally difficult than for other genres because while the characters must have conflict, the resolution needs to be solved in a way that readers know "that the couple will stay together no matter what". It was also important to her to include "accurate realistic portrayals of African Americans" rather than stereotypes.

In 1999, Ray's novel, Incognito, was adapted by Black Entertainment Television (BET) for broadcast.

She helped make the Arabesque imprint, which was owned by BET and dedicated to African-American romance, a success. In 2004, she and other authors were celebrated for their contributions to Arabesque which is now owned by Kimani.

== Fiction ==
- Fallen Angel – 1992 reissue 2003 (Odyssey Books/St. Martin's Press)
- Undeniable – 1995 (Kensington/Arabesque)
- The Bargain – 1995 (Kensington)
- Incognito – 1996 (Arabesque Bet's first made-for-TV movie in 1999)
- Silken Betrayal – 1995 (Arabesque)
- I Know Who Holds Tomorrow – 2002 (St. Martin's)
- Rockin' Around That Christmas Tree – 2003 (St. Martin's)
- Spirit of the Season (Sarah's Miracle novella) – 1994 (Kensington/Arabesque)
- Rosie's Curl and Weave (The Awakening novella) – 1999 (St. Martin's Press)
- Winter Nights (Until Christmas novella) – 1998 reissue 2004 (Kensington/Arabesque)
- Della's House of Style (A Matter of Trust novella) – 2000 (St. Martin's)
- Welcome to Leo's (novella) – 2000 (St. Martin's)
- Going to the Chapel (Southern Comfort novella) – 2001 (St. Martin's)
- Getting Merry (The Wish novella) – 2002 (St. Martin's)
- Living Large (Strictly Business novella) – 2003 (NAL)
- Whole Lotta Love (That Wright Woman novella) – 2004 (NAL)
- Let's Get it On (Blind Date novella) – 2004 (St. Martin's)
- Big Girls Don't Cry (His Everything Woman novella) – 2005 (NAL)
- How Sweet the Sound (Then Sings My Soul novella) – 2005 (Harlequin)
- Chocolate Kisses (novella) – 2006 (Signet)
- On the Line (novella) – 2007 (Sepia)
- Twice the Temptation – 2010 (St. Martin's Press)

== Series/Related Titles Grayson Friends Series ==
- The Way You Love Me – September 2008 (St. Martin's)
- Nobody But You – March 2009 (St. Martin's)
- One Night With You – November 2009 (St. Martin's)
- It Had To be You – April 2010 (St. Martin's)
- A Seductive Kiss – January 2012 (St. Martin's)
- Just With a Kiss – February 2012 (St. Martin's)
- A Dangerous Kiss – June 2012 (St. Martin's Press)
- All I Ever Wanted – February 2013 (St. Martin's Press)
- All of My Love – May 2013 (St. Martin's Press)
- All That I Need – June 2013 (St. Martin's Press)
- All That I Desire – Rio's book October 2013 (St. Martin's Press)

== Invincible Women Series ==
- Like the First Time – May 2004 (St. Martin's)
- Any Rich Man Will Do – September 2005 (St. Martin's)
- In Another Man's Bed – February 2007 (St. Martin's)
- Not Even if You Begged – February 2008 (St. Martin's)
- And Mistress Makes Three – July 2009 (St. Martin's)
- If You Were My Man – March 2010 (St. Martin's)

== Taggart/Falcon Series ==
- Forever Yours – July 1994(Pinnacle Books)(reissued March 2010 )
- Only Hers – April 1996 (reissued August 2004 in a 3-in-1 edition entitled Falcon Saga)
- Break Every Rule – August 1998 (reissued August 2004 in a 3-in-1 edition entitled Falcon Saga)
- Heart of the Falcon – April 2000 (reissued August 2004 in a 3-in-1 edition entitled Falcon Saga)

== The Graysons of New Mexico Series ==
- Until There Was You – April 2000 (reissued November 2008 )
- You and No Other – March 2005 (St. Martin's)
- Dreaming of You – September 2006 (St. Martin's)
- Irresistible You – March 2007 (St. Martin's)
- Only You – October 2007 (St. Martin's)

== Against the Odds Series ==
- Trouble Don't Last Always – February 2004 (reissue of The Turning Point from April 2001)
- Somebody's Knocking at My Door – May 2003

== Family Affair/Hidden Legacy Series ==
- I Know Who Holds Tomorrow – April 2002 reissue October 30, 2012
- When Morning Comes – June 2012
- After the Dawn – June 2013

== Awards ==
- Romantic Times Career Achievement
- EMMA
- The Golden Pen
- The Atlantic Choice
- Romantic Times 2008 Reviewers' Choice Award Winners for AFRICAN-AMERICAN ROMANCE Reviewers' Choice Awards – Best Books Not Even If You Begged, St. Martin's Griffin (February 2008)
- Borders 2008 Bestselling Multicultural Romance Award for Nobody but You
- Written's 2010 Readers Choice Book of the Year for If You Were My Man

=== Screen adaptations ===
- Incognito: TV 1999
