= Romance Writers of America =

American writers' association

Romance Writers of America (RWA) is an American non-profit writers' association founded in 1980. Its mission is to "advance the professional and common business interests of career-focused romance writers through networking and advocacy and by increasing public awareness of the romance genre." Relevant works must be themed around the development of a romantic relationship between two people, and there must be a happy ending. As well as published authors, those with complete but unpublished manuscripts are eligible for membership.

== Organization ==
Authors are eligible to join the RWA if they are actively pursuing a career writing romance novels. According to the RWA, the main plot of a romance novel must revolve around the two people as they develop romantic love for each other and work to build a relationship together. Both the conflict and the climax of the novel should be directly related to that core theme of developing a romantic relationship, although the novel can also contain subplots that do not specifically relate to the main characters' romantic love. Furthermore, a romance novel must have an "emotionally satisfying and optimistic ending."

Authors are divided into two tracks, PRO and PAN. The PRO network is for authors who have completed a manuscript but not yet published it. Once a PRO member, they are able to view online workshops and booklets about the business of publishing. PAN is the Published Author Network. Approximately 2,000 members qualify for PAN. These authors have seen their novels published in print and have earned a set threshold from royalties or advances. Authors who use vanity publishers who offer little or no editing or promotional help do not qualify for PAN.

Members may also join local or online RWA chapters. These provide writers with the opportunity to meet, share critiques, and learn the art of writing. With this practice, "romance writers are the only authors who train their own competition and pride themselves on sharing what they know."

Industry professionals, as well as aspiring authors who have not completed a manuscript, can join as non-voting associate members. Booksellers and librarians can join as non-voting affiliate members.

All members receive the RWA's magazine, the Romance Writer Report.

== Annual conference ==
Every summer, the RWA holds a national conference. In 2007, approximately 1,900 members attended the conference in Dallas, Texas, participating in workshops and attending lectures designed for both published and unpublished authors. A Librarian's Day started the conference, and, in 2007, over 150 librarians attended presentations by some of the more popular romance authors, including Jayne Ann Krentz, Suzanne Brockmann, Nora Roberts, Shana Abe, and Susan Elizabeth Phillips. Each year, some of the workshops are business-oriented, focusing on how to pitch a novel or write for multiple publishers. Other workshops focus on creative pursuits, including how to use swords and sword fights in a story line, how to use firefighter lingo, or how to pick the cover art for your book. The annual conference features a literacy signing, where the public is invited to meet close to 500 authors and gain autographs. In 2007, the event raised almost $60,000 for literacy charities. The RWA funds several scholarships for members to attend the national conference. The scholarships pay for travel, lodging, and registration fees.

== Awards ==
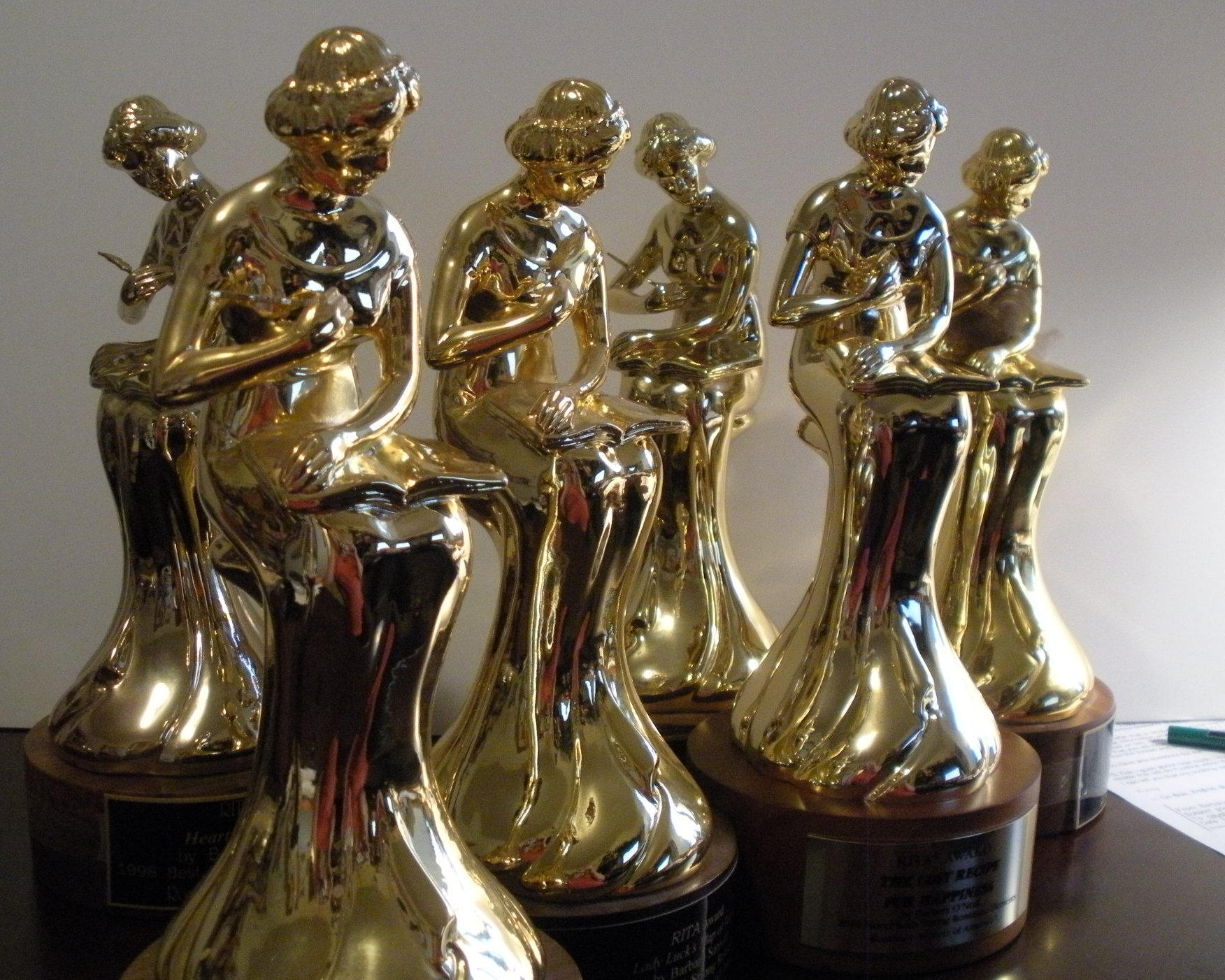
RITA Awards

The RWA holds an awards ceremony during the annual conference.

=== Golden Medallion ===
In 1982, the RWA presented its first award, the Golden Medallion, in four categories. The categories expanded to six in 1983, eight by 1989 and eventually twelve.

=== Golden Heart ===
For many years, the RWA has honored unpublished authors with a Golden Heart Award. After a break from 2020 to 2025, the Golden Heart contest resumed. The first round is judged by a panel of RWA members. One hundred manuscripts are chosen as finalists. The finalists' manuscripts are judged by acquiring editors from romance publishing houses. Generally, about 30% of Golden Heart finalists find their work accepted by print publishers. The award itself is a gold medallion in a heart shape.

=== RITA ===
In 1990 the Golden Medallion was replaced with the RITA Award. Named for the RWA's first president, Rita Clay Estrada, the award signifies excellence in one of 12 categories of romantic fiction. Authors and editors submit published works for consideration near the end of the year. A few months later, finalists are announced. The winners are presented with a statuette.

Authors who have won at least three RITA Awards within a specific category of romance (e.g., Long Contemporary Romance, Romantic Suspense) is inducted into the RWA Hall of Fame. The first inductee was Nora Roberts. Other authors honored include Jo Beverley, Julia Quinn, Catherine Tinley and Jennifer Greene.

=== Vivian ===
After controversies concerning the lack of diversity in RITA winners, the RITA Award was replaced in 2021 with the Vivian Award.

== History ==
The Romance Writers of America was founded in 1980 in Houston, Texas, by romance editor Vivian Stephens, and Rita Clay Estrada was its first President, According to their by-laws, the organization's purpose is to “advance the professional and common business interests of career-focused romance writers through networking and advocacy and by increasing public awareness of the romance genre."

The romance industry boomed in the 1980s, and the RWA grew rapidly. In 2000, the RWA had an operating budget of over $1 million, the largest of any professional genre writers' organization. As of 2007, the organization had over 9,000 members and over 150 chapters. These include chapters arranged geographically as well as special-interest online chapters that focus on themes such as medical romance. As membership has grown, the organization has grappled to identify its core purpose; for example, is the organization primarily a social club or a place for professional networking. There have also been discussions within the membership about whether it is meant for published or unpublished authors, and which types of published authors should count.

Part of its mission has been to advocate for authors. The RWA persuaded Harlequin books to register copyrights for authors' works and to allow writers to own their own pseudonyms. Previously, authors were forced to leave their pseudonym behind if they switched publishing houses, making it more difficult for their fans to follow. The RWA has also assisted members to escalate issues they have experienced with various technology platforms.

Some romance novel authors and readers believe the genre has additional restrictions, from plot considerations such as the protagonists meeting early on in the story, to avoiding themes such as adultery. Disagreements have centered on the firm requirement for a happy ending, or the place of same-sex relationships within the genre. Some readers admit stories without a happy ending, if the focus of the story is on the romantic love between the two main characters (e.g. Romeo and Juliet). Others believe the definition should be more strictly worded to include only heterosexual pairing. While the majority of romance novels meet the stricter criteria, there are also many books that are widely considered to be romance novels that deviate from these rules. Therefore, the general definition, as embraced by the RWA and publishers, includes only the focus on a developing romantic relationship and an optimistic ending.

=== Diversity and inclusion issues ===
The RWA has struggled with diversity and inclusion. As of 2019, more than 80% of its members were white, as compared to about 61% of the population of the United States. As the industry changed, there was resistance to including authors of romance novels which featured homosexuality love stories. A 2005 poll in the Romance Writer Report asked members if the by-laws should be changed to define romance as between a woman and a man. Nora Roberts, one of the most prolific and famous romance authors, wrote a letter of protest that the question had been included. The then-president of the board of directors responded in an email that she was worried "the lesbians were going to take over" the RWA. There was a community uproar, and the matter was dropped.

Another uproar ensued in 2015 when Kate Breslin, a finalist for the Best Inspirational Romance RITA, was accused of antisemitism. The hero of her novel, For Such a Time, was a Nazi concentration camp commandant, and the heroine was an imprisoned Jew who later converted to Christianity. At the same conference, an editor for a major publisher admitted that they did not purchase any books by non-white authors or featuring non-white characters; those were instead segregated to a different imprint. The Board began to focus more on diversity and inclusion efforts, leading to a backlash from some of its white members. In summer 2017, founding RWA member Linda Howard posted on an internal forum that "'Diversity for the sake of diversity is discrimination'". The resulting furor led Howard to leave the organization.

Many authors pointed to the RITA awards as evidence that the organization did not take diversity and inclusion seriously. Any author could pay to nominate her books. Entrants can then elect to judge other nominees. Judges were not provided with training on scoring or avoiding bias. An RWA analysis of the previous 18 years of RITA finalists and winners showed that less than 0.5% of the finalists were black authors, and no black woman had ever won. Jennifer Prokop, the romance reviewer for Kirkus Reviews, analyzed 60 books that were finalists for the 2019 RITAs and discovered that white authors overwhelmingly created worlds that were populated with white, cisgender, heterosexuality characters, regardless of the time frame or setting of their novels. This was true even for paranormal stories that featured fictional creatures such as vampires.

In 2018, several critically praised books by authors of color were not among the finalists for RITAs. Some authors of color, including RWA Lifetime Achievement Award Winner Beverly Jenkins and popular novelist Helen Hoang, refused to enter their books at all. In other cases, the books were entered but did not score highly enough to become a finalist.

At the annual conference that year, Lifetime Achievement Award Winner Suzanne Brockmann gave a speech denouncing white supremacy within the organization and the industry. In an effort to address the controversy, the Board changed some of the contest rules, including by tracking scores by individual judges to attempt to detect bias. They also required that some of the judges in each category be librarians or booksellers, and that at least one judge should be a person of color or a queer person. Of the 80 authors who were finalists in 2019, three were women of color. The finalist list excluded author Alyssa Cole, whose submission An Extraordinary Union had been named one of the New York Times's 100 Notable Books of the Year, an honor that is exceedingly rare for a romance. Many authors began to debate whether the RITA Awards were truly representative of excellence in the industry. The Board released a statement "“apologiz[ing] to our members of color and LGBTQ+ members for putting them in a position where they feel unwanted and unheard.” At the conference in July 2019, two of the RITA winners, M. Malone and Kennedy Ryan, were black women, and one woman, Nisha Sharma, was the first winner of South Asian descent.

In August 2019, many authors participated in a Twitter discussion about racism and gatekeeping within the romance publishing industry. Courtney Milan, a Chinese-American author, joined the discussion and critiqued a book written by a current acquiring editor, Kathryn Lynn Davis. Milan labeled the book and its portrayal of a half-Chinese heroine as racist. Davis and the publisher for whom she works, Suzan Tisdale, filed RWA ethics complaints against Milan, who was at the time the chair of the Ethics Committee. In late December 2019, the Board voted to suspend Milan for one year and ban her from leadership for life; within a few days, after questions were raised about the process used to sanction Milan, the Board rescinded the punishment. Eight members of the group's Board of Directors, all women of color, resigned as a block. RWA President Carolyn Jewell also resigned.

There was significant backlash to the sanctioning of Milan. The annual RITA awards were cancelled after many judges resigned and hundreds of authors withdrew their books from consideration. Most of the major publishers in the industry announced they would not attend or support the annual RWA conference because they questioned the RWA's support of diversity and inclusion.

The Cultural, Interracial, and Multicultural Special Interest Chapter of the RWA, which hosted authors whose local chapters were not perceived as welcoming to women of color, started a petition to recall new President Damon Suede. Suede and the RWA Executive Director resigned on January 9, 2020. More board resignations followed.

In May 2020, the RWA announced that it was replacing the Rita Awards with the Vivian Awards, named after Vivian Stephens, the organization's founder, a black editor, "in an attempt to move on from the controversy" and to recognise that "happily ever afters are for everyone”.

=== Chapter 11 bankruptcy ===
In May 2024, the RWA filed for Chapter 11 bankruptcy, stating that it owed millions of dollars in contracts to convention centers for hotel rooms. An 80% decline in membership since 2019, described by the RWA as "predominantly due to disputes concerning diversity, equity, and inclusion issues between some members of a prior RWA board and others in the larger romance writing community", and a corresponding decline in membership revenue were contributing factors to the bankruptcy.
