= List of writers' conferences =

This is a list of worldwide authors' conferences for writers of all genres.

== Europe ==
=== Bulgaria ===
- Sozopol Fiction Seminars, Sozopol

=== France ===
- Paris Writers Retreat, Paris

=== Iceland ===
- Iceland Writers Retreat, Reykjavík

=== Ireland ===
- BooksGoSocial Dublin Writers Conference – Fiction & Non Fiction, Dublin

=== Portugal ===
- Disquiet International Literary Program, Lisbon

=== United Kingdom ===
- Festival of Writing, York
- Historical Novel Society Conference, London
- Milford Writer's Workshop, science fiction writers; various locations
- Winchester Writers' Conference, Winchester
- Swanwick Writers' Summer School, UK's longest-running writers' school
- Writers Holiday

== North America ==
=== Bahamas ===
- Salt Cay Writers Retreat, Blue Lagoon Island

=== Canada ===
- Shuswap International Writers' Festival, Salmon Arm, British Columbia
- Surrey International Writers' Conference, Surrey, British Columbia
- Ontario Writers' Conference, Durham Region, Ontario

=== Mexico ===
- San Miguel Writers' Conference and Literary Festival, San Miguel de Allende

=== United States ===
==== A–E ====
- The Alabama Writers' Conclave, Alabama
- Alabama Writing Workshop, Birmingham, Alabama
- Algonkian Writer Conferences, Arizona, California, Massachusetts, and Virginia
- The Aloha Writers Conference, Kapalua, Hawaii and Maui
- American Christian Fiction Writers Conference, location varies
- American Society of Journalists and Authors (ASJA) annual conference, New York City
- Antioch Writers' Workshop, Yellow Springs, Ohio
- Arkansas Writers Conference, Little Rock, Arkansas
- Art of the Wild Writers' Conference, Olympic Valley, California
- Association of Personal Historians conference, location varies, Canada and United States
- Atlanta Writers Conference, Atlanta
- Atlanta Writing Workshop, Atlanta
- Atlantic Center for the Arts Master Artists-in-Residence Program, New Smyrna Beach, Florida
- Auburn Writers Conference, Auburn, Alabama
- Author U Extravaganza conference, Denver
- Authors Combat Academy, Nashville, Tennessee
- Authors Conference Infinity Publishing Gathering of Authors, Valley Forge, Pennsylvania
- Authors of the Flathead conference, Kalispell, Montana*
- Authors' Salon at Clockwork Alchemy, Burlingame, California*
- Avondale Writers Conference, Avondale, Arizona
- AWP Conference & Bookfair, North America's largest literary conference; location varies
- Backspace Writers Conference
- Bear River Writers' Conference, Boyne City, Michigan
- Blaze Your Own Trail to Self-Publishing Writers' Conference, San Diego
- BlogU, Baltimore
- Blue Flower Arts Winter Writers Conference, New Smyrna Beach, Florida
- Blue Pen Writers' Conference, Knoxville, Tennessee
- Blue Ridge Writers' Conference, Blue Ridge, Georgia
- Book Passage Children's Writers & Illustrators Conference, Corte Madera, California
- Book Passage Mystery Writers Conference, Corte Madera, California
- Book Passage Travel Writers & Photographers Conference, Corte Madera, California
- BookBaby Independent Authors Conference, Philadelphia
- Boston Writing Workshop, Boston
- Bread Loaf Writers' Conference, Middlebury, Vermont
- Broadleaf Writers Conference, Decatur, Georgia
- Business of Pet Writing Conference, New York City
- Business of Writing International Summit, August 1–2, 2014; Louisville, Kentucky
- California Dreamin' Writers' Conference, Brea, California
- Calliope Writing Coach, year round, Salt Lake City
- Cape Cod Writers Center Conference, Cape Cod
- Carolinas Writers Conference, Wadesboro, North Carolina
- Cartersville Area Writers Conference, Cartersville, Georgia
- Castle Rock Writers' Conference, Castle Rock, Colorado
- Chanticleer Authors Conference, Bellingham, Washington
- Chapter One Young Writers Conference, Chicago
- Chesapeake Writing Workshop, Washington, D.C.
- Chicago Writing Workshop, Chicago
- Chuckanut Writers Conference, Bellingham, Washington
- Cleveland Writing Workshop, Cleveland
- Colorado Christian Writers Conference, Estes Park, Colorado
- Colorado Gold Conference, Denver
- Colrain Poetry Manuscript Conference, Colrain, Massachusetts
- Community of Writers, Olympic Valley, California
- Creative Nonfiction Writers Conference, Pittsburgh
- Crested Butte Writers Conference, Crested Butte, Colorado
- Crossroads Writers' Conference, Macon, Georgia
- DFW Writers Conference, Dallas-Fort Worth
- Edgar Awards, Varies
- Erma Bombeck Writers' Workshop, Dayton, Ohio

==== F–M ====
- Florida Writing Workshop, Tampa, Florida
- Florida Christian Writers Conference word-weavers.com/floridaevents, Leesburg, Florida
- The Frost Place Conference on Poetry, Franconia, New Hampshire
- The Frost Place Conference on Poetry and Teaching, Franconia, New Hampshire
- The Frost Place Poetry Seminar, Franconia, New Hampshire
- The Frost Place Writing Intensive, Franconia, New Hampshire
- Golden Crown Literary Society Annual Conference, July/August; various locations
- Hampton Roads Writers' Conference, Virginia Beach, Virginia
- Hawaii Writers Conference (formerly the Maui Writers Conference), Maui
- HippoCamp: A Conference for Creative Nonfiction Writers, presented by Hippocampus magazine, August 2015, Lancaster, Pennsylvania
- Historical Novel Society Conference in North America, mid-to-late June, various locations
- Historical Writers of America Conference, August 19–21, 2016, Colonial Williamsburg
- Hollihock Writers Conference, New Bedford, Massachusetts
- Horseback Writing Retreats, Wyoming
- Houston Writers Guild – Annual Writers Conference, April, various locations
- How to Write & Publish Your Book, Mississippi
- Imaginarium, Louisville, Kentucky
- Indiana Faith and Writing Conference, Anderson, Indiana
- Indiana University Writers' Conference, Bloomington, Indiana
- Indiana Writing Workshop, Indianapolis
- Jack London Writers Conference, San Francisco
- Jackson Hole Writers Conference, Jackson Hole
- Judith Briles Unplugged Authors and Writers Conference, August 27–29, 2015, Denver
- Juniper Institute for Young Writers, Amherst, Massachusetts
- Juniper Summer Writing Institute, Amherst, Massachusetts
- Kachemak Bay Writers Conference, Homer, Alaska
- Kauai Writers Conference, November 9–11, 2018, Kapaa, Hawaii and Kauai
- Kentucky Women Writers Conference, Lexington, Kentucky
- Key West Literary Seminar, Key West
- Killer Nashville, last full weekend every August, Nashville, Tennessee
- LA Writers Conference, Los Angeles
- Liberty States Fiction Writers Create Something Magical Conference, Iselin, New Jersey
- Life the Universe & Everything (LTUE), Provo, Utah
- Literary Cleveland Inkubator Conference, Cleveland
- Longleaf Writers Conference at Seaside, FL, Seaside, Florida
- Los Angeles Writers Retreat, Los Angeles
- Mad Anthony Writers' Conference, Hamilton, Ohio
- Malice Domestic, Bethesda, Maryland
- Meet the Publishers!, Tulsa, Oklahoma
- Mendocino Coast Writers Conference, Fort Bragg, California
- Michigan Writing Workshop, Livonia, Michigan
- Minnesota Writing Workshop, Minneapolis
- Mississippi Writers Guild Writers' Conference, Vicksburg, Mississippi

==== N–Z ====
- Nashville Writers Conference, Nashville, Tennessee
- NETWO's Annual Spring Writers Roundup, Mount Pleasant, Texas
- New Orleans Genre Writer's Conference, New Orleans
- New York Pitch Conference, New York City
- North Georgia Christian Writers Conference, Toccoa, Georgia
- Northern Colorado Writers Conference, Fort Collins, Colorado
- Northwest Georgia Writers Conference, Calhoun, Georgia
- Oklahoma Writers' Federation, Inc. (OWFI), Oklahoma City
- Ozark Creative Writers Conference, Eureka Springs, Arkansas
- Ozarks Writers League Conference, Missouri
- Philadelphia Writing Workshop, Philadelphia
- Pikes Peak Writers Conference, Colorado Springs, Colorado
- Pittsburgh Writing Workshop, Pittsburgh
- PublishingGame.com Conference, Boston
- Quills Conference, Salt Lake City
- Read.Write.Share. Writers Weekend, Little Rock, Arkansas
- Red Clay Writers Conference, Kennesaw, Georgia
- River Writing Journeys for Women, Moab, Utah
- Rosemary Beach Spring Writers' Conference, May 11–14, 2011, Rosemary Beach, Florida
- St. Davids Christian Writers' Conference, Grove City, Pennsylvania
- San Diego Writers Festival, April 6, San Diego
- San Francisco Writers Conference, February 14–17, San Francisco
- San Francisco Writing Workshop, San Francisco
- Sanibel Island Writers Conference, Sanibel, Florida
- Santa Barbara Writers Conference, Santa Barbara, California
- Santa Fe Writers Conference, Santa Fe, New Mexico
- Scribblers' Retreat Writers' Conference, St. Simons, Georgia
- Seattle Writing Workshop, Seattle
- Sewanee Writers' Conference, Sewanee, Tennessee
- SF:SE 2015, Orlando
- Society of Children's Book Writers and Illustrators, two per year, summer in Los Angeles and winter in New York City
- Southampton Writers Conference, Southampton, New York
- Southern California Writers' Conference
- Southern Christian Writers Conference, Tuscaloosa, Alabama
- Southern Women Writer's Conference, Berry College, Rome, Georgia
- Southwest Christian Writers Conference, Durango, Colorado
- Space Coast Writers' Guild Annual Conference, Melbourne, Florida
- StokerCon, varies
- Taos Summer Writers' Conference, Taos, New Mexico
- Tennessee Writing Workshop, Nashville, Tennessee
- The Writing Academy, Farmington, Minnesota
- Truckee Meadows Community College (TMCC) Writers' Conference, Reno, Nevada
- Tulsa NightWriters Craft of Writing Conference, Tulsa, Oklahoma
- UNF Writers Conference, August 5–7, 2011, University of North Florida, Jacksonville, Florida
- Unicorn Writer's Conference, Manhattanville University, Purchase, New York
- VCFA Writers' Conference at CalArts, August 8–14, 2026, Vermont College of Fine Arts, Los Angeles, California
- Washington Writers Conference, Washington, DC
- Wesleyan Writers Conference, Middletown, Connecticut
- West Coast Writers Conference, July 20–22, 2012, Los Angeles Valley College, Los Angeles
- White County Creative Writers Conference, Searcy, Arkansas
- Willamette Writers conference, Willamette Writers' annual conference, first weekend in August, Portland, Oregon
- Women Writing the West, Los Angeles
- Writeaways, New Mexico, Ireland, France, Italy
- WordSmitten Writing Conference, St. Petersburg, Florida
- Write-by-the-Lake Annual Writer's Retreat, Madison, Wisconsin
- Write in Atlanta 2011, Atlanta
- Write Stuff, Greater Lehigh Valley Writers Group, Bethlehem, Pennsylvania
- Write to Publish Conference, Wheaton, Illinois
- Writer's Digest Conference, August 1–3, 2014, The Roosevelt Hotel, New York City
- The Writer's Hotel NYC Writers Conference, New York City
- The Writers' Institute, Madison, Wisconsin
- Writers' Police Academy, Green Bay, Wisconsin
- Writers @ Work, Park City, Utah
- Writers in Florence
- Writers in New York
- Writers in Paradise, St. Petersburg, Florida
- Writers in Paris
- Writing and Illustrating for Young Readers Conference, Salt Lake City
- Writing By Writers Workshop @ Tomales Bay
- Writing It Real in Port Townsend, Port Townsend, Washington
- Yale Writers' Conference, New Haven, Connecticut

== South America ==
=== Peru ===
- Peru, Weaving Words & Women

== See also ==
- African Writers Conference
