= Pikes Peak Writers Conference =

The Pikes Peak Writers Conference started in 1993 and during each April, brings the New York publishing industry to Colorado Springs, Colorado for a weekend packed with workshops, pitch meetings, read & critique sessions and much more. Writer's Digest Magazine voted Pikes Peak Writers Conference one of the top ten writing conferences in the United States. Guest speakers have included Nora Roberts, Stephen Coonts, Diane Mott Davidson, Robert Crais, Jennifer Crusie, Rupert Holmes, David Morrell, Susan Elizabeth Phillips, Jim Butcher, and other authors and publishing professionals.

== PPWC 2026 ==
The conference will take place on April 17-19, 2026 at the Doubletree by Hilton in Colorado Springs, Colorado. Keynotes include Mary Robinette Kowal, Pippa Grant and Reavis Wortham. Over 25 faculty members, including ten editors and agents, will be presenting 75+ workshops, taking pitches, participating in Read & Critiques and more. Registration is open until April 10, 2026. Members of Pikes Peak Writers get a 10% discount.

This year's theme is SADDLE UP AND WRITE!

== PPWC History ==
=== 2025 ===
Theme: The Future is Now, May 2-4 2025. Featuring keynotes John Gilstrap, David R. Slayton, and Avery Flynn

=== 2024 ===
Theme: Jazz Up Your Writing: the Roaring 20’s, April 26-28. 2024. Featuring keynotes Kevin Ikenberry. Nancy Naigle, and Yasmin Angoe

=== 2023 ===
Theme: Wordstock '23, April 28–30, 2023 featuring keynotes speakers Robert Crais, Barbara O'Neal, and Dave Chesson.

=== 2022 ===
Theme: GOAL! Set Your Goal, Meet Your Goal on April 29-May 1. 2022 featuring keynotes Mark Leslie Lefebvre, Jane Friedman, and Naima Simone.

=== 2021 ===
Theme: Bet on Yourself, April 23–25, 2021, a virtual conference featuring keynote speakers Mary Robinette Kowal, Reavis Wortham and Laura DiSilverio.

=== 2020 ===
Theme:...well... PPWC 2020 was cancelled due to Covid 19.

=== 2019 ===
Theme: It Takes a Tribe, May 3–5, 2019. Keynotes included Anne Bishop, John Gilstrap, Rachel Howzell Hall, and Susan Wiggs.

=== 2018- ===
Theme: Do it! Don't Quit, April 27–29, 2018. Keynotes included Laurell K Hamilton, Mary Robinette Kowal, Jonathan Mayberry, and Bob Mayer.

=== 2017 ===
Theme: Silver Jubilee, April 27–29, 2017. Keynotes included Kevin Hearne, Tess Gerritsen, Darynda Jones, and Donald Maass.

=== 2016 ===
Theme: Dare to Dream, April 15–17, 2016 Keynotes included Joe R. Lansdale, Wendy Corsi Staub, Rachel Caine, Jeff Lindsay and Kevin J. Anderson.

=== 2015 ===
Pikes Peak Writers held their 2015 between April 23 and April 26, 2015. The theme was "Choose Your Writing Adventure". Keynote speakers includecd Mary Kay Andrews, Andrew Gross, Seanan McGuire, and R. L. Stine

=== 2014 ===
Pikes Peak Writers held their 2014 conference from April 24–27, 2014. The theme was Write Here, Write Now! Make it Happen! Faculty members included: Agatha, Anthony, Macavity and Emmy winning author Hank Phillippi Ryan, New York Times Bestselling Author Gail Carriger, Campbell Award Nominee & Emmy Award Writer Chuck Wendig and Hugo Award Winning Fantasy Writer Jim C. Hines.

=== 2013 ===
The 2013 conference took place April 19–21, 2013. The theme was "Writing from the Ashes: Never Lose Sight of Your Dreams." Featured speakers included Libba Bray, Barry Eisler, Amber Benson, and David Liss. In addition, PPWC will have ten editors and agents including Michael Braff (Del Rey Books), Melissa Miller (Katherine Tegen Books/HarperCollins), Pat VanWie (Bell Bridge Books), Deb Werksman (Sourcebooks), Hannah Bowman (Liza Dawson Associates), Sorche Fairbank (Fairbank Literary Representation), Barry Goldblatt (Barry Goldblatt Literary), Nicole Resciniti (The Seymour Agency), Kate Testerman (kt literary), and Pam van Hylckama Vlieg (Larsen Pomada Literary Agents).

=== 2012 ===
The 2012 Pikes Peak Writers Conference "Celebrating 20 years of Success" occurred on April 19–22, 2012 at the Marriott Colorado Springs. Featured speakers included Robert Crais, Donald Maass, Jeffery Deaver, and Susan Wiggs. Eleven agents and editors took appointments and gave critiques. Celebratory events included a special booksigning, an awards gala banquet and special gifts for attendees.

=== 2011 ===
The 2011 Pikes Peak Writers Conference took place on April 29-May 1, 2011 at the Marriott Colorado Springs. The theme was "Blaze the Write Trail" with featured speakers John Hart, Linda Lael Miller, and Beth Kendrick. Ten agents and editors attended.

=== 2010 ===
The 2010 Pikes Peak Writers Conference took place on April 22–25, 2010 at the Marriott Colorado Springs. The keynote speakers included Donald Maass, Kelley Armstrong, Jodi Thomas and Tim Dorsey. Eleven agents and editors attended.

=== 2009 ===
The 2009 Pikes Peak Writers Conference took place on April 23–26, 2009 at the Marriott Colorado Springs. The keynote speakers included Jeffery Deaver, James N. Frey, Laura Resnick and Barbara Samuel. Eleven agents and editors attended.

=== 2008 ===
The 2008 Pikes Peak Writers Conference was held April 25–27, 2008 at the Marriott Colorado Springs. Featured speakers included Geffen Award winner Carol Berg, NYT Best Selling author Vicki Lewis Thompson, Edgar Award winner David Liss, and Comic writers/artists Walter Simonson and Louise Simonson.

=== 2007 ===
The 2007 Pikes Peak Writers Conference was held April 20–22, 2007 at the Marriott Colorado Springs on Tech Center Drive. (Formerly known as the Wyndham Hotel.) Featured speakers included Jim Butcher, author of the Dresden Files series, Robert Crais, author of the Elvis Cole books, Mary Jo Putney, USAToday bestselling author of romance and fantasy and Dr. Eric Maisel, renown creativity coach. The conference celebrated its 15th year with several special events including a Thursday night booksigning, an additional track of workshops on Friday, a Saturday night Awards Banquet and 15th Anniversary Celebration and a never-before Sunday-only option for readers and fans of Robert Crais.

Conferences were also held from 1993 to 2006.
