= PPWC =

PPWC may refer to:

- Pikes Peak Writers Conference, an annual publishing industry conference
- Public and Private Workers of Canada (formerly known as the Pulp, Paper and Woodworkers of Canada), a labour union based in British Columbia, Canada
- Pound for Pound World Championship, an unofficial Football World Championship
