= Keith Garebian =

Canadian critic, biographer and poet

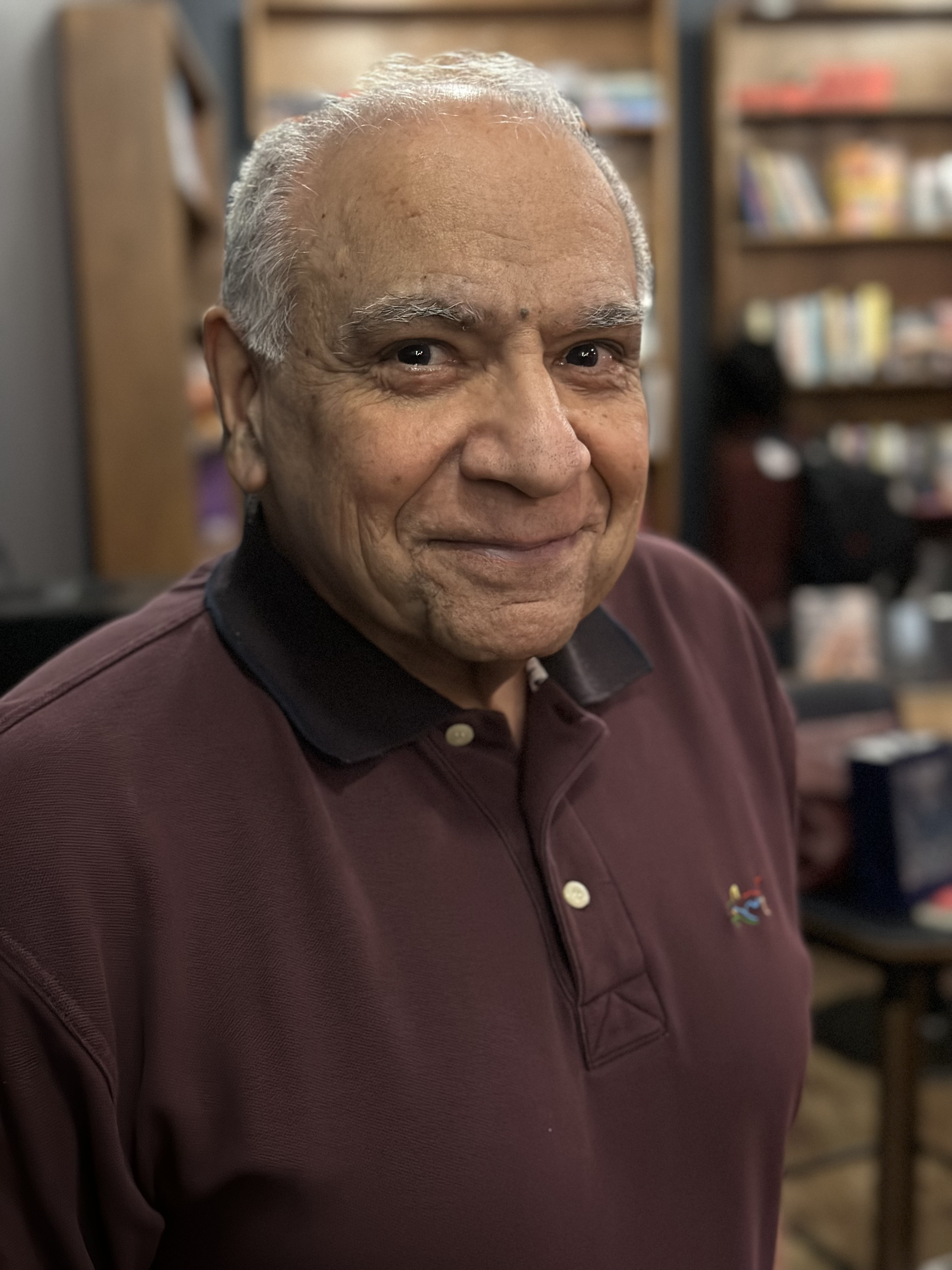
Garebian at Glad Day Bookshop, November 2023

Keith Garebian (born 1943) is a Canadian critic, biographer, and poet. He was born in Bombay, India, to an Armenian father and Anglo-Indian mother, and immigrated to Canada in 1961. He earned his PhD from Queen's University on Canadian and Commonwealth Literature. He has taught part-time at McGill University, Concordia University and Trent University. He has won awards for his poetry and writing, including the 2014 Poetry Award of the Surrey International Writers Conference, and the 2013 Saroyan Medal for cultural contributions by the Armenian diaspora. He is a four-time winner for the Mississauga Art Award for Writing.

As a critic, Garebian has written for The Globe and Mail. As of 2020, he lives in Mississauga, Ontario, where he is named as critic-at-large by the Mississauga Library System to write theater and book reviews.

== Bibliography ==
=== Poetry ===
- Scan: Cancer Poems (2021)
- Against Forgetting (2019)
- Blue: The Derek Jarman Poems (2009)
- Samson’s Hair and Other Satiric Fantasies (Micro Prose, 2004)
- Reservoir of Ancestors (Mosaic, 2003)

=== Reviews and Non-fiction ===
- Hugh Hood (Twayne, 1983)
- Leon Rooke and His Works (ECW, 1989)
- A Well-Bred Muse: Selected Theatre Writings 1978-1988 (Mosaic, 1991)
- George Bernard Shaw and Christopher Newton: Explorations of Shavian Theatre (Mosaic, 1993)
- William Hutt: Masks and Faces (Mosaic, 1995)
- The Making of 'West Side Story' (Mosaic, 1995)
- Pain: Journeys Around My Parents (Mosaic, 2000)
- The Making of ‘Guys and Dolls’ (Mosaic, 2003)
- The Making of 'Cabaret' (Oxford University Press, 2011)
- The 1978 Stratford Festival (1978)
