= DFW Writers Conference =

Professional conference

DFW Writers Conference (or DFWCon)
- Status: Active
- Genre: Multi-genre professional writers' conference
- Frequency: Annual
- Venue: Hurst Conference Center
- Location: Hurst, Texas
- Country: United States
- Years active: 2008–19, 2021–
- Attendance: 300+
- Organizer: DFW Writers' Workshop
- Filing status: 501(c)(3) non-profit organization
- Website: dfwcon.org

The DFW Writers Conference, also known as DFWCon, is an American annual professional conference for writers in multiple genres. The letters DFW stand for Dallas–Fort Worth. The conference is held at the Hurst Conference Center in Hurst, Texas each October.

== History and operations ==
The conference's purpose is to help writers grow their professional network, develop their writing skills and business knowledge, and meet with publishing-industry professionals. Attendees include literary agents and editors from publishing houses around the country, and writers from Texas and other states. The conference offers more than 300 attendees the opportunity to meet with a literary agent for one-on-one pitch sessions, and its education program typically features more than fifty writing classes.

The conference started in 2008. It is organized by members of the DFW Writers' Workshop, a 501(c)(3) non-profit organization that helps writers in multiple genres develop their writing to publication-level quality. The group has operated in the DFW metroplex since 1977.

The DFW Writers Conference was selected by readers of The Writer magazine in 2019 and 2020 as "The Best Writing Conference In Texas"

=== Events ===
2008: The first conference took place at the Grapevine Convention Center in Grapevine, Texas, attended by approximately 110 people. Its keynote speaker was entertainment journalist and romance author Candace Havens.

2009: The second event took place at the Grapevine Convention Center in Grapevine, Texas. Its keynote speaker was bestselling thriller author Bob Mayer.

2010: The third event took place at the Grapevine Convention Center in Grapevine, Texas. Its keynote speaker was The New York Times- and USA Today-bestselling romance author Jodi Thomas.

2011: In its fourth year, the conference had grown to the point where it needed a larger venue. It moved to the American Airlines Training Center in Fort Worth. The New York Times-bestselling romantic thriller author Sandra Brown was the keynote speaker.

2012: Forced to move again due to the size of its attendance, the conference relocated to the new Hurst Conference Center in Hurst, Texas. Bestselling action/adventure and techno-thriller author James Rollins was the keynote speaker.

2013: The conference remained at the Hurst Convention Center in Hurst, Texas. The keynotes this year were Pulitzer Prize nominee, journalist and author Michael Capuzzo and bestselling thriller author Deborah Crombie.

2014: DFWCon took place at the Hurst Conference Center in Hurst, Texas. The keynotes this year were bestselling multi-genre author Jonathan Maberry and literary agent Donald Maass.

2015: For the first time, the conference moved to Dallas and took place at the Dee and Charles Wyly Theatre. Keynote speakers were bestselling mystery writer Charlaine Harris, bestselling science fiction writer Kevin J. Anderson, and photography writer Me Ra Koh.

2016: The 2016 event took place April 23–24 at the Fort Worth Convention Center in downtown Fort Worth, Texas. Its keynote speakers were horror, fantasy and suspense author Christopher Golden and veteran journalists Tara McKelvey and Thomas Kunkel.

2017: The 10th anniversary event featured the theme "InTENsify" and focused on rededicating oneself to one's writing goals. The conference returned to downtown Dallas and took place at the Sheraton Dallas. Its keynote speakers were science fiction and fantasy author Rachel Caine and memoirist and popular blogger Stephanie Klein.

2018: After three years of trying different venues, the conference returned to the Hurst Conference Center, a move that proved popular with attendees. The keynote speaker was multi-published young adult science fiction author Scott Westerfeld.

2019: The keynote speaker was noted science fiction author Chuck Wendig. The conference added a trio of special guests: playwright and author Shay Youngblood, bestselling author Bob Mayer, who had been the keynote speaker in the event's 2nd year, and author Liara Tamani.

2020: 2020 saw the event canceled due to the COVID-19 pandemic.

2021: The conference was held virtually October 23–24 with a limited schedule of online classes and presenters.

2022: DFWCon returned as an in-person event at Hurst Conference Center October 8–9. The keynote speaker was New York Times bestselling romance and suspense author Heather Graham.

2023: Pulitzer-Prize-Nominated author and philanthropist Dave Eggers and actress, humanitarian, and children's book author Evangeline Lilly were the keynote speakers at the 2023 DFWCon, held October 7-8 at the Hurst Conference Center.

2024: "Craft, Career, and Community" was the theme when the conference returned to the Hurst Conference Center October 5-6 2024. Keynotes were provided by New York Times bestselling thriller author Steve Berry and award-winning Young Adult author A. S. King.

2025: New York Times Bestselling author and longtime DFW Writers' Workshop member Katie Bernet directed the 2025 conference, held October 4-5 at the Hurst Conference Center. Gilmore Girls actress and memoir author Kelly Bishop joined literary agent and podcaster Carly Watters to deliver the keynotes.

2026: DFWCon has announced plans to return for its 18th conference October 3-4 in Hurst Texas. The theme is "For the Love of Writing." Over ninety classes are planned for the 2026 event which will feature keynote speaker Katherine Center on Saturday. Sunday's keynote speaker Natalie Sue will be in conversation with author and 2026 conference director Rebecca Seifert.

== See also ==
- List of writers' conferences
