= Scribblers' Retreat Writers' Conference =

The Scribbler's Retreat Writer's Conference is a writers' conference held four times a year in St. Simons Island, Georgia. Scribblers' Retreat encourages, educates, and promotes new and published authors of all ages to continue to write and publish their works.

== History ==
Scribblers' Retreat Writers' Conference is a non-profit organization and was founded in January 2009

The organization that supports the advancement of writers, published and non-published. They offer four sessions of specifically chosen genres throughout the year to provide conference attendees a symposium of experienced teachers, writers, editors, and others from the publishing world.

== Authors ==
Noted authors who have been speakers at the conferences include:

- Diana Gabaldon
- Karen White
- Adam Davies
- Steve Berry
- Jack McDevitt
- Lois Ruby

== See also ==
- List of writers' conferences
