= Bet Me =

Contemporary romance novel by Jennifer Crusie

Bet Me is a contemporary romance novel written by Jennifer Crusie. It won a Romance Writers of America Rita Award for Best Contemporary Single Title in 2005.

== Development ==
As research for her MFA dissertation, Jennifer Crusie determined to read 100 romance novels. Crusie had never explored that genre, and she was convinced she would find it difficult to wade through that types of books. To her surprise, she discovered that she enjoyed the genre, so much so that she became a literary critic for the genre and began writing romance novels herself.

She finished her initial draft of Bet Me in 1992. There was no interest from the publishing industry, and Crusie put the manuscript aside. Over the next ten years, Crusie sold several short category romances, and then signed with St. Martin's Press to release longer single-title novels. In 2002, Crusie's editor at St. Martin's Press, Jennifer Enderlin, agreed to purchase Bet Me, provided Crusie rewrote it.

The book was released February 10, 2004. The book was given much support by the publisher, including ads in The New York Times and Glamour. To further support the book, Crusie embarked on a national book-signing tour. At Crusie's insistence, the cover of the book featured a cherry. This was a nod to her online fans, who had named themselves "The Cherries". Critic Kimberly Baldus sees the cherry "as a wink from author to readers and back again, creating a sense of a community forged through shared knowledge and insights about the novel". Crusie herself references the sense of community between readers and authors, describing it as "one of the most powerful aspects of the romance novel".

== Plot summary ==
Bet Me by Jennifer Crusie is a contemporary romance novel centered around Minerva Dobbs and Calvin Morrisey. Minerva, or Min, is a pragmatic actuary who doesn't believe in fairy tales. Calvin, or Cal, is a charming and commitment-averse businessman. Their paths cross in a bar where Cal is bet by his friend David that he cannot get Min to go out with him. Cal accepts the bet, unaware that Min has overheard the entire conversation.

Despite knowing about the bet, Min agrees to go on a date with Cal, thinking she can enjoy a free dinner and prove to herself that she is immune to his charms. The date, however, turns out to be more enjoyable than either of them anticipated. They part ways but soon find themselves thrown together repeatedly due to a series of coincidental and often comical events, including mutual friends and their exes’ schemes.

As Min and Cal continue to interact, they are forced to confront their own insecurities and misconceptions about love and relationships. Min struggles with her self-image and the pressure from her mother to lose weight and conform to societal standards. Cal, on the other hand, grapples with his fear of commitment, stemming from a tumultuous past relationship.

Throughout the story, their budding relationship faces numerous hurdles, including interference from Min's ex-boyfriend David and Cal's ex-girlfriend Cynthie. Despite these challenges, Min and Cal's chemistry and growing affection for each other become undeniable. The novel also features a delightful cast of secondary characters, including Min's friends Liza and Bonnie, and Cal's friends Tony and Roger, who add humor and depth to the narrative.

In the end, Min and Cal both realize that their initial judgments were wrong and that they genuinely care for each other. The story concludes with them overcoming their fears and embracing the possibility of a happily-ever-after together, despite their earlier cynicism.

== Analysis ==
In much of mainstream American culture, it is unusual to see an overweight female as the object of romantic of sexual interest. The larger the woman, the more likely it is that she will be ridiculed rather than embraced. Crusie's novels depart from this stereotype; her heroines are not necessarily young and thin and physically perfect. According to critic Kyra Kramer, Crusie's use of heroines who are overweight, such as Minerva, the protagonist of Bet Me, "communicates a compelling feminist message of women’s empowerment and emancipation from some elements of the hegemonic gender ideology". Min is described most often as "chubby". The author never reveals specifics of Min's size. Rather than present her body as an object to be viewed, Crusie focuses on feelings, gestures, and reactions. Secondary characters interpret her size differently; some describe her as fat, some as voluptuous. Readers can relate to the conflicting descriptions, as the characters' debate reflects society's inability to agree on a single acceptable body size.

Although she is not morbidly obese, Min expends significant mental energy worrying about her weight and her desirability. This is exacerbated by her mother, who constantly stresses that Min must be thin in order to catch and keep a husband, just as society reinforces the idea that the ideal woman is thin. Although Min half-heartedly diets in an attempt to fit into a bridesmaid dress, throughout the novel every likable character encourages her to stop trying to change herself. Her attempt to cook low-fat food is a disaster, replaced by a gourmet meal.

The hero, Cal, is described as very attractive, and from the beginning of the book Min doubts his attraction to her. Crusie allows Min to question her long-held beliefs about her own attractiveness as Cal shows that he is not only not disgusted by her body, but he is actually turned on by her enjoyment of food. He validates her desire for enjoyment of both food and sex, offering her the rich foods that she wants but has denied herself, and then, when she gains the courage to ask for what she wants, he provides it without making her feel guilty. Cal helps her to learn to embrace her body. By the end of the novel, Min has chosen to revel in her shape and gather a new wardrobe that flaunts her body instead of hides it.

Min's self-reinvention extends also to her underwear. In one scene, Nanette scolds Min for wearing white cotton underwear, because only sexy, lacy underwear will attract and keep a husband. Crusie appears to give credence to this theory, describing Cal's "light-headed" moments when he catches a glimpse of Min's new red lace bra, before shattering it when Cal tells - and shows - Min that he finds her equally attractive in scruffy sweats as in fancy lace. Despite what her mother has consistently told her, Min learns that a man will love her despite her lingerie and despite her weight.

Cal is also shown as fighting against stereotypical gender norms. His acquaintances believe him to be a womanizer and expect him to continue to act in that manner. Although he finds the bets revolving around his contact with Min distasteful, he is constantly pressured to fulfill them. He also faces pressure from his parents to conform and to join the family law firm. Min stands up for him and his choices. Because they are each supporting the other, each rescuing the other, they become allies. Cal is not her savior; they are equals.

== Reception ==
Romantic Times reviewer Jill M. Smith gave the novel 4.5 out of 5 stars, praising Crusie's use of humor and her eccentric characters. Review in both Publishers Weekly and Entertainment Weekly praised the character of Minerva but gently chided the predictability of the plot. Library Journal reviewer Margaret Hanes also noted the novel's formulaic nature but found it was rescued by the well-drawn characters and witty dialogue, resulting in an enthusiastic recommendation. In Booklist, John Charles judged that Crusie appropriately balanced cynicism versus optimism, resulting in a ""wickedly witty" novel.

The editors of Crimson Romance named the book one of the 100 Best Romance Novels of all time for its "memorable characters [and] heartfelt and humorous look at how two different people can find their common ground"". These reviewers enjoyed the subplot surrounding Cal's ex and her view of love through the focus of biology and instinct; Entertainment Weekly, on the other hand, dismissed that subplot as useless psychobabble.

The novel was nominated for the 2004 Romantic Times award for Best Contemporary Novel (with Romantic Elements) and won the Romance Writers of America's prize, the Rita Award, in 2005 for Best Contemporary Single Title.

== Sources ==
- Lawler, Jennifer, ed. (2013). "Chapter 6: Bet Me". The 100 Best Romance Novels: From Pride and Prejudice to Twilight: Books to Fall in Love - and Lust - With. Adams Media. ISBN 9781440560989.
