= Getting Rid of Bradley =

1994 novel by Jennifer Crusie

- First edition
- Author: Jennifer Crusie
- Language: English
- Genre: Contemporary romance
- Publisher: Harlequin Books
- Publication date: 1994
- Publication place: United States
- Media type: Print
- Pages: 248 pages
- ISBN: 9781551668659

Getting Rid of Bradley is a contemporary romance novel written by Jennifer Crusie and first published in 1994, with a reissue in 2008. The book tells the story of Lucy Savage, a woman recently jilted by her husband Bradley, a suspected embezzler that Detective Zachary Warren wants to locate even more now that someone appears to be after Lucy. The novel won the 1995 RITA Award for Best Short Contemporary.

== Background ==
Jennifer Crusie began her career writing category romances. One of these was Getting Rid of Bradley, published in February 1994 by Harlequin Books. Category romances have limited print runs and are usually available for no more than a month. Mira Books reissued the novel as a mass market paperback in 2008.

On her website, Crusie noted that writing this novel helped her realize that dogs can be critical to stories.

== Plot ==
The novel begins with the worst day of Lucy Savage's life. Her husband failed to appear in divorce court, she is shot at, but thinking she is being mugged, she assaults the cop who saved her, and then accidentally dyes her hair green.

Zach Warren, the detective she assaulted, is convinced that Lucy's ex-husband, Bradley Porter, is involved in an embezzlement plot carried out by his close high school friend, John Bradley, and that the attempts on Lucy's life are related. To protect her, and to satisfy his own curiosity about her, Zach moves into the house with Lucy and her three dogs.

Through a series of deadly situations, including a car bomb and an exploding bed, Zach is constantly at Lucy's side to protect her, until John Bradley shows up looking for the bonds he has embezzled, which the police have already confiscated. Lucy protects herself, and then considers the incident over. Later, however, Bradley comes to the house, determined to step back into their marriage as if nothing had happened. Lucy, with Zach's help, manages to defuse the situation.

After that attack, Lucy consents to marrying Zack and allowing him to move in permanently with her and her (now 4) dogs.

== Reception ==
Winner of the 1995 Romance Writers of America RITA Award for Best Short Contemporary
