= Authors' conference =

Conference where writers gather to share and review work

An authors' conference or writers' conference is a type of conference where writers gather to review their written works and suggest improvements. This process helps an author improve their work and learn to be a better writer for future works, both by receiving critiques of their own work and by mentoring the work of the other authors. Writers may also benefit from meeting and hearing from professionals in related fields, such as agents, editors, illustrators, publishers, and providers of other relevant services.

Unlike most other conference styles, an authors' conference is very participatory. Most conferences are divided into presentations, each of which has a clear separation of roles among a one or more presenters and an audience. While authors' conferences may include some such presentations, writers' conferences also include numerous sessions wherein an author does not present their work but rather listens while the other participants discuss the work. In this way, the author gains an understanding of what readers learn by reading the work.

An authors' conference consists of two phases, shepherding and writers' workshops. Shepherding usually (but not always) occurs before the conference meeting, and the meeting itself is organized as a writers' workshop.

One popular series of authors' conferences is the Pattern Languages of Programming conferences, held to encourage and assist authors of software design patterns and pattern languages.

== Shepherding ==
The shepherding process occurs before the conference meeting. Authors submit papers for the conference, then each paper is assigned to a shepherd, an experienced author who works with the submitter to improve their paper. The process often consists of three iterations in as many weeks where the shepherd makes suggestions for improvement and the submitter incorporates the suggestions. This one-on-one mentoring using the submitter's unfinished work as an example is very effective for teaching the submitter how to be a better writer, although its effectiveness is ultimately determined by the participants' dedication and their working relationship. At the end of the shepherding process, the shepherd recommends whether to accept the submission for review at the conference. An accepted submission should meet minimal quality standards for effective evaluation in the writers' workshop, and should have been improved significantly by the submitter during the shepherding process.

== Writers' workshop ==
The writers' workshop process occurs during the conference meeting. The workshop consists of 6–10 sessions, one per submission to be reviewed. The workshop participants are the authors of those submissions and any other reviewers the authors choose to accept. In a session, the authors of the submission listen quietly while the other participants discuss what they liked about the submission and suggest improvements. This gives the authors of the submission insight into what information readers are learning from the work and ideas for improving the work. Reviewers discussing a work are careful to make productive comments, both because the author is listening and because in other sessions that author will become the reviewer and make comments.

=== Examples ===
- Iowa Writers' Workshop
- Clarion Writers Workshop
- Gotham Writers' Workshop
- Milford Writer's Workshop
- DFW Writers Conference (DFWCon)

== See also ==
- List of writers' conferences
