= Welcome to Temptation =

2000 novel by Jennifer Crusie

First edition (publ. St. Martin's Press)

Welcome to Temptation is a contemporary romance written by Jennifer Crusie and released in 2000. The novel explores the love story between Sophie Dempsey, a screenwriter making a movie in the small town of Temptation, and the mayor, Phinneas "Phin" Tucker. Over the course of the story, they solve a murder and deal with conflict around Sophie's movie, which is alternately a documentary or a porn flick. The lead characters appear in supporting roles in the sequel, Faking It, which centers on Sophie's brother, a secondary character in Welcome to Temptation.

Crusie, who has often defended the romance genre against critics, wrote the novel to deconstruct the complaints levied against the genre. The novel examines perceptions of reality versus fantasy and concludes that embracing a fantasy may lead to greater self-awareness. Through imagery and plot points, Crusie shows the shift in the power dynamics between the couple change as their relationship progresses, resulting in a more equal balance of power. Sophie's movie, which includes scenes taken from her courtship with Phin, provides an opportunity to explore the boundaries between private acts and public events. Using a protagonist who is also a con artist, Crusie highlights the inherent con in romance novels - that two extremely different people who have known each other for only a short time could live happily ever after.

The book was well-received; reviewers highlighted its humor, dialogue, and more daring sex scenes. It was a New York Times besteller and was number two on Amazon.com's list of top contemporary romances of 2000.

== Background ==
As research for her doctoral dissertation, Jennifer Crusie determined to read 100 romance novels. Crusie had never explored that genre, and she was convinced she would find it difficult to wade through those types of books. To her surprise, she discovered that she enjoyed the genre, so much so that she became a literary critic for the genre and began writing romance novels herself.

During the 1980s and 1990s, literary critics frequently dismissed the romance novel genre, often for contrasting reasons. Janice Radway contended that the genre is bad for women, blinding them to the difference between fantasy and reality. She posited that women turn towards books in this genre to get an emotional release denied to them in their daily lives, where they must devote themselves to caregiving and have little time for themselves. Other critics saw the genre as simply a rehash of stereotypical sexual and marital roles. In the late 1990s, Crusie wrote several essays defending the romance novel against critics.

Crusie was also developing her own career as a novelist. Lamenting the lack of the “edgy, angry feminist love stories" that she most enjoyed reading, Crusie determined to fill that gap herself. After writing several short category romances, Crusie transitioned to writing single-title novels. Her third of these longer works was Welcome to Temptation, which was released in hardcover in March 2000 by St. Martin's Press. It was reissued in trade paperback format in September 2010.

One of the secondary characters, Davy Dempsey, becomes the hero of Crusie's follow-up, Faking It. The protagonists in this novel are secondary characters there.

== Plot summary ==
The novel begins as Sophie Dempsey and her younger sister Amy approach the small Ohio town of Temptation. They have been hired by their former sister-in-law, Clea Whipple, to create a movie that will revive her failing acting career. Before the sisters reach the town, they are involved in a minor car accident with Stephen and Virginia Garvey, prominent citizens of Temptation who also consider themselves the moral pillars of society.

The hero of the book, Phinneas "Phin" Tucker, is another prominent citizen; he is the fourth generation of his family to serve as mayor of Temptation.

As the book progresses, there is conflict between the characters on the nature of the film they are making; ultimately three different versions are produced. One is a documentary, Return to Temptation, showcasing Clea and the town's reactions to her return to her birthplace and the making of the movie. The second version, Cherished, is women's soft-core pornography, with Clea and Rob Lutz, the sone of her former lover, as the featured actors. A third version, Hot Fleshy Thighs is a bad hard-corn porn movie aimed at men.

Near the middle of the novel, Clea's husband Zane is murdered.

== Style ==
The novel is a contemporary romance. The plot is, at first glance, fairly typical of the genre. The hero is rich and of a high social stature, and his love will elevate a poor, yet honest lower-class heroine. Crusie quickly turns this on its head. The hero dislikes his position and dreams of walking away from his social responsibilities. The heroine dislikes the hero and is actively working to undermine his authority.

Unlike other heroes of the genre, Phin is neither aloof nor a committed bachelor. He is a single father and is portrayed as a loving man who is already comfortable in a domestic role.

== Themes ==
Welcome to Temptation is, at its core, a feminist defense of the romance genre. Through imagery, characterization, and plot points, Crusie deconstructs many of the complaints that critics frequently leveled against the genre during the 1990s. In so doing, she also echoed her own journey to becoming a novelist, from skepticism to acceptance to an embrace of that which she was originally prepared to dislike. The heroine is even given a name derived from The Grand Sophy, a novel by highly regarded romance novelist Georgette Heyer.

=== Fantasy vs reality ===
By having the heroine frequently quote movie lines, Crusie initially implies that Sophie has difficulty distinguishing between reality and fantasy. The initial movies that she quotes, Tootsie, Psycho, The Manchurian Candidate, and Fear and Loathing in Las Vegas, all involve characters whose reality is twisted in some way. As the novel progresses, however, it becomes clear that Sophie is one of the only characters who is fully grounded in reality. The supporting characters have each embraced their own fantasies, causing them to misread their realities and make poor choices. Crusie even explicitly tells the reader that the Garveys do not approve of any type of fiction, yet their characters deceive themselves with fantasies. By contrast, Sophie, the character primarily associated with fiction, both in quoting it and writing it, is shown as more perceptive.

Sophie embraces fantasy when she begins her liaison with Phin. While describing the first sexual encounter between the protagonists, Crusie alludes directly to Radway's conclusions in Reading the Romance. Radway wrote that women are attracted to romance novels "because the social role with which they identify themselves leaves little room for guiltless, self-interested pursuit of individual pleasure”. As Phin coaxes Sophie to allow him to pleasure her, he uses similar language: "pleasure with no guilt", "no responsibility", "be selfish". As the relationship progresses, Crusie shows that Sophie more fully embraces her sexuality and becomes even more self-aware; this physical and mental transformation is a direct repudiation of the contemporary critic's insistence that reading a romance or embracing the fantasy, "renders women more passive and invisible".

Crusie uses Sophie's boyfriend, Brandon, as a representation of the romance critic. When Sophie confesses to him that she has engaged in sexual acts with another man, his immediate response is to insist her perceptions of the event are invalid, and, according to Moore and Selinger, reinterpret "her behavior in psycho-political terms", as Radway did in Reading the Romance when she did not accept her subjects' reasons for reading in the romance genre.

=== Liminality ===
In a nod to eighteenth century British amatory fiction, 'Welcome to Temptation explores the boundaries between public and private life, using gossip and the protagonists' seemingly private sexual interactions. The original amatory novels, such as those by Delarivier Manley, contained erotic scenes of seduction, often framed in a voyeuristic way (looking through a window), but also a retelling of gossip or scandal, primarily "salacious scandal about real political figures of the day". Critic Kimberly Baldus refers to this shifting between the public and private as liminality. Crusie's heroine embraces this; entire scenes of the screenplay she is writing are based on, or entirely taken from, conversations or sexual interactions she has had with the hero. The protagonists' first sexual encounter occurs outdoors, with the possibility of discovery. Sophie "willingly exposes herself on screen" by including the event in her film. When the scene is filmed for the movie, the characters realize that someone else is watching the scene through binoculars, illustrating "the difficulty of completely controlling visual display". Inclusion in the script turns a private interlude between two individuals public, yet the binocular-holding character turns a relatively private moment of filming into a more public event. When the more erotic version of the movie is stolen and shown on local television, the characters must confront the knowledge that their most private moments are now essentially public property.

Both Manley and Crusie's novels use gossip to demonstrate the fluidity between private actions and public perceptions. After other characters paint Sophie in a negative light, she uses the perceptions revealed in their gossip to reinvent herself. Familiarity with all of the local gossip helps one character solve the murder mystery. In exchange for keeping her private acts (the murder) from becoming public, the villain agrees to change her stance on the censorship ordinance; her no vote keeps private opinions private.

=== Heterosexual power dynamics ===
In the late 1990s, romance novel heroines were usually the "good girls"; while the hero may have a fling with a woman who is highly sexually active, he generally married a less sexual, more sedate woman. This reflected the general socio-cultural norms against a woman's blatant display of sexuality, which were also displayed in other mainstream media. Flashbacks reveal that Sophie experienced this societal backlash in high school; she was humiliated by a classmate ridiculed her for having sex. In the early part of the book, Sophie agrees to a purely physical affair with Phin, who resembles the boy to whom she lost her virginity. He seduces Sophie by offering to pleasure her with no expectation of reciprocity, inviting her to explore her sexuality without fear of societal punishment. As Sophie begins to explore her sexuality, she compares their affair to a sexual school and casts Phin in the role of teacher. Critic Kyra Kramer points out that because Phin is also the object of her sexual exploration, he becomes an ally instead of a master. In one scene near the end of the book, Crusie describes Sophie sitting on the hood of Phin's car, knees apart, leaning back on her hands. This is a stereotypical scene of female submission to male fantasy, yet the scene ends with Sophie pushing Phin down and straddling him. She now has the position of power. Sophie's negotiation of the boundaries of the lessons, her sexual assertiveness, "reverses normative female sexuality". As the novel progresses, Sophie begins to trust Phin, and she shifts her focus to fulfilling his fantasies. This signals that their relationship is reaching a state of equality. Crusie has allowed the bad girl to get the hero.

Radway had posited that romances end with marriage because society insists that female sexual desire is only appropriate within its confines. In her previous essays, Crusie had argued that this was incorrect, that marriage in romance novels is instead a negotiation of the power dynamic between the protagonists. Marriage is their reward for reaching a balance of power that suits their characters. Crusie's interpretation of this power struggle in Welcome to Temptation is seen through two recurring symbols. The first is the town's water tower. At the beginning of the novel, the water tower is described as flesh-colored and is seen as a phallic symbol. Later in the novel, the water tower is painted red, and one character insists it looks like a lipstick tube. By the end of the book, natural forces have changed its appearance again, so the water tower now resembles a breast. Although the structure itself remained intacts, it was transformed from the male to the female, signifying a shift in the balance of gender and power. Similarly, the novel frequently refers to "More of the Same", the slogan Phin's family had used in mayoral races for four generations. At the end of the book, Phin decided he no longer wishes to be mayor. Sophie implies that she will now take up the political mantle for the family - the mayor's office will remain in the same family, but the sameness of a Tucker mayor will now be different.

Although the hero's mother, Liz, knows that her son and Sophie are having a sexual relationship, she attempts to intimidate or buy off Sophie, as she did with Phin's first wife, so that Phin will not marry her.

=== Deception ===
This novel, like Faking It and Trust Me On This, features con artists. Crusie's tricksters are generally not villains. The story explores how one can trust someone who lies. Almost every character is engaging in some form of deception. Their reasons varied; the novel excused deception for the sake of love and family, while characters suffered consequences for lies based on self-defense, money, politics, and sex.

In this novel, the hero is mostly trustworthy, a man with little to hide. The heroine comes from a family of tricksters. Although she intends to leave that life behind, the conflict between her sister's movie and the town's new porn ordinance makes it difficult for her to stop lying. She must choose between her loyalty to her sister, which requires her to lie so her movie can be finished, and her loyalty to Phin, which requires her to tell the truth so that his career as mayor is not put in jeopardy. The conflict seems unresolvable until Sophie embraces the con.

Crusie implies that the romance novel itself is a con. This is made obvious from the opening lines, which allude to Herman Melville's The Confidence-Man: His Masquerade. Very early in the novel, Sophie and Amy Dempsey describe the five steps to a successful con, and in the book's first eleven pages, Crusie displays all of them. Critic Christine A. Valeo noted that "the first eleven pages deftly serve as a microcosm of the novel they launch[.] Crusie has in some ways been able to get what she wanted and get out. That is, she has both established and raised reader expectations, and, if the novel’s run on the New York Times Bestseller List is any indication, hooked her reader." The reader is a willing participant, choosing to buy and enjoy the novel even though it is fairly unrealistic to think that extremely different people from dysfunctional families could find happily ever after in only three weeks.

=== Perception transformation ===
The opening scene of the novel describes Sophie's perceptions of the small Ohio town. She distrusts small towns and sees the landscape as ominous. The last scene is a transformation of the first; Sophie views the same scenery through her new perspective and experiences it as happy and hopeful. The theme is carried through the novel. Sophie is preoccupied with the fading wallpaper in her kitchen; in the beginning of the book, she sees them as cherries, which reminds her of the humiliation that followed her first sexual experience. Later in the novel, it is revealed that the images are actually apples. The description of the water tower, likewise, evolves from a penis to lipstick to a breast. With these "shifting visual images", Crusie demonstrates that initial assumptions are often false. This theme manifests even more explicitly with the movie the characters are filming. Multiple iterations exist - depending on the perceptions of the character, the movie could be a documentary, soft-core porn, or hard-code porn.

== Reception ==
The initial cover of Welcome to Temptation featured a picture of a cherry. This inspired Crusie's online fans to name themselves "The Cherries". In an acknowledgement of that, Crusie insisted that a picture of a cherry appear on most of the rest of her book covers. Baldus sees the cherry "as a wink from author to readers and back again, creating a sense of a community forged through shared knowledge and insights about the novel". Crusie herself references the sense of community between readers and authors, describing it as "one of the most powerful aspects of the romance novel".

Romantic Times gave the book 4.5 out of 5 stars. A Publishers Weekly review described Welcome to Temptation as "[a] romantic comedy that adds luster to the genre." The review highlighted Crusie's use of humor and offered appreciation for the way she "adroitly mixes the outrageous and the practical". At All About Romance, Jennifer Keirans cautioned readers that the novel is not a traditional sweet romance, instead incorporating black humor and more daring sex scenes, but judged the result "sexy, intelligent, unexpectedly moving". Both reviewers praised the "deliciously clever repartee" between the protagonists, which Publishers Weekly noted "[kept] energy and sexual tension high". Romantic Times reviewer Jill M. Smith noted that "the humor and insight into human nature make [the book] downright irresistible." Reviewer Mandi Schreiner also praised the book's humor and its spicy sex scenes.

The book reached the New York Times Bestseller List. Amazon.com editors chose it as the number 2 contemporary romance of 2000.
