= Carolinas Writers Conference =

The Carolinas Writers Conference takes place in April each year in Wadesboro, North Carolina at the Lockhart-Taylor Center. The first conference was held in 2009 and was hosted by the Anson County Writers Club, South Piedmont Community College, the Carolinas Romance Writers and the Hampton B. Allen Public Library. The first conference featured two authors: North Carolina author Robert Inman and Floridian Robert Macomber as well as 19 local authors.

In 2012, a storytelling event was added called Back Porch Stories. The keynote speakers in the Fifth Annual Carolinas Writers Conference were Marjorie Hudson, Rob Dunn, Robert Macomber and Angela Knight. The storytellers were: Michael R. Harrell, Martha R. Johnson and Tyris Jones.

The conference includes Back Porch Stories, held in the evening at the Ansonia Theatre. Sponsors include Anson Bank & Trust, the Anson County Writers Club, the SPCC, Union County Writers Club, The Anson County Tourism Development Authority, and the Anson County Arts Council.
