= Robert Dunn (biologist) =

American entomologist

Robert Dunn is a biologist, writer and professor in the Department of Applied Ecology at North Carolina State University. He has written several books and his science essays have appeared at magazines such as BBC Wildlife Magazine, Scientific American, Smithsonian Magazine, National Geographic and others. He has become known for efforts to involve the public as citizen scientists in arthropod surveys and bacterial flora studies. His projects include studies of belly button biodiversity, mites that live on human faces, ants in backyards, and fungi and bacteria in houses.

He was a Fulbright fellow in Australia.

== Biography ==
Dunn grew up in the then rural town of Hartland, Michigan. Growing up, Dunn spent much of his time outdoors catching snakes, fish and turtles. The basement of his house was filled with these animals which sometimes escaped, only to reappear much later under a pillow or climbing up the steps. Dunn earned a BA in Biology from Kalamazoo College in 1997. While at Kalamazoo College, Dunn traveled to Ecuador. There, he and a friend were attacked by monkeys. In Ecuador, Dunn also lived in a small wooden shack beside a river in a forest called Guajalito in the Reserva del Río Guajalito. There, he sometimes ate dinner with an old Czech woman who had migrated to Ecuador during World War II. A river flowed behind the shack and up in the hills around the shack spectacled bears were common. While at the shack, Dunn conducted a study on epiphytic bromeliads that live on trees. Parts of the study were successful, but Dunn's attempt to also study what lived in the bromeliads failed when horses came to the shack at night and ate the bromeliads.

Dunn obtained a PhD in Ecology and Evolution from the University of Connecticut in 2003. At the University of Connecticut, Dunn studied the recovery of tropical forests in Costa Rica, Peru and Bolivia after clear-cutting and use for traditional agriculture. He sought to understand how long it takes for the biodiversity of animals to return to regenerating forests. While studying this, Dunn learned that he knew less about the rain forest than the average eight-year-old Amazonian kid, as appears to remain true. Upon finishing his PhD, he became a Fulbright fellow at Curtin University in Australia where he worked with Jonathan Majer and Byron Lamont to study the dispersal of seeds. In Australia, many thousands of rare and interesting plant species have seeds dispersed by ants. The seeds produce a small fruit (an elaiosome) that the ants use to carry them back to their nests. They then feed the fruit to their babies and the seed itself germinates in the ants' garbage much the way that papaya seeds grow out of human latrines throughout the tropics. These seeds also sometimes travel much longer distances in the guts of birds. Dunn worked with other scientists to show that emus can carry seeds, even those that have evolved to be carried by ants, great distances across Australia. In Australia, Dunn was also kicked by a kangaroo.

After his Fulbright fellowship, Dunn was a postdoctoral researcher at the University of Tennessee, Knoxville for one year. In Knoxville, Dunn worked with Nate Sanders and studied the biodiversity of the Great Smoky Mountains National Park, which he later wrote about in his book Every Living Thing. Dunn and Sanders continue to do research together and co-founded the global ant collaboration, a large group of ant biologists all around the world who team up to study the global biology of ants. Dunn joined the faculty at North Carolina State University in 2005, first in the Zoology Department, then in Biology Department and subsequently in the Biological Sciences Department. At North Carolina State University, Dunn wrote his second and third books.

At North Carolina State University Dunn runs the yourwildlife.org program which aims to understand, while working with the public, the species that live around us in our daily lives. He is now also the leader of the Students Discover project which aims to bring real science experiences to classrooms around the world. Dunn's work includes studies of parasites of raccoons, bacteria in houses, ants in backyards, giant crickets that live in homes and the biodiversity of belly buttons. Meanwhile, Dunn's recent writing has considered the quest to find new superheavy elements, why men are bald, how modern chickens evolved, whether a virus can make a person fat, the beauty of the Gulf of St. Lawrence, the biology of insect eggs, the secret lives of cats, the theory of ecological medicine, why the way we think about calories is wrong, and why monkeys (and once upon a time, human women) tend to give birth at night.

== Bibliography ==
- Every Living Thing: Man’s Obsessive Quest to Catalog Life, from Nanobacteria to New Monkeys (HarperCollins Publishers, 2009)
- The Wild Life of Our Bodies (HarperCollins Publishers, 2011)
- The Man Who Touched His Own Heart (Little Brown, February, 2015), a biography of Werner Forssmann
- Never Out of Season: How Having the Food We Want When We Want It Threatens Our Food Supply and Our Future (Little, Brown, 2017)
- Never Home Alone (Basic Books, 2018)
- A Natural History of the Future (Basic Books, 2021)
- The Call of the Honeyguide (Basic Books, 2025)

== Reactions ==
Kirkus Reviews wrote of Every Living Thing: "Even sophisticated readers will blink as the author reveals the dazzling diversity of life, its ability to thrive in areas formerly thought barren (miles under the sea, under ice caps, under the earth’s crust, in space), and the ingenuity of scientists searching for it."
