= Reavis Z. Wortham =

American novelist

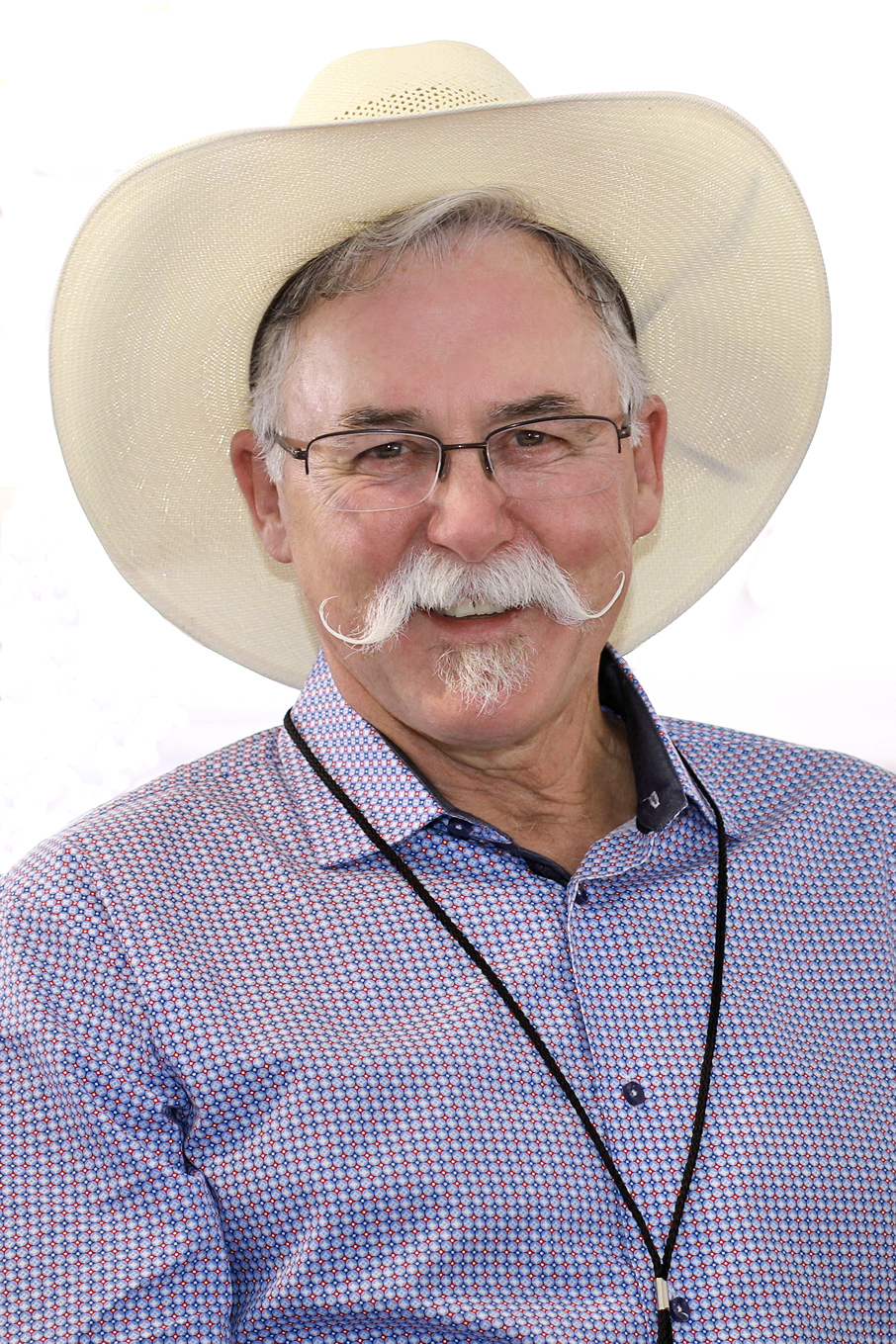
- Wortham at the 2018 Texas Book Festival
- Born: Reavis Z. Wortham c. 1954; Paris, Texas, U.S.
- Occupations: Novelist, short story writer
- Writing career
- Language: English
- Genres: Mystery, Crime, Thriller

Reavis Z. Wortham (born c. 1954 in Paris, Texas), is an American author who is critically acclaimed for his The Red River Series books, including The Rock Hole, which was a finalist in the prestigious Benjamin Franklin Award presented by the Independent Book Publishers Association, and a finalist for the Will Rogers Medallion. In 2018 he published his seventh novel in the Red River series, “Gold Dust.” His new Sonny Hawke thriller series premiered in 2017 with “Hawke’s Prey,” and Hawke’s War released in June, 2018.

He's a member of Mystery Writers of America, the Writers’ League of Texas, International Association of Crime Writers (North American Branch), Sisters in Crime, The Texas Outdoor Writers Association, and International Thriller Writers.

== Works ==
The Red River Series (published by Poisoned Pen Press unless noted otherwise)

1. The Rock Hole (2011)
2. Burrows (2012)
3. The Right Side of Wrong (2013)
4. Vengeance Is Mine (2014)
5. Dark Places (2015)
6. Unraveled (2016)
7. Gold Dust (2018)
8. Laying Bones (2021)

The Sonny Hawke Series (published by Kensington Publishing Corp. unless noted otherwise)

1. Hawke’s Prey (2017)
2. Hawk’s War (2018)

Short stories included in:

1. Bound By Mystery (2017, Poisoned Pen Press)
2. Murder On Wheels: Eleven Tales Of Crime On The Move (2016, Wildside Press)
3. Doreen’s 24 Hour Eat Gas Now Café (1999, Texas Fish & Game Publishing Co.)
