= Surrey International Writers' Conference =

Annual event in British Columbia, Canada

The Surrey International Writers’ Conference (SiWC) is held every October in Surrey, British Columbia, Canada. The first conference took place in 1993 and it has been run annually since. The conference aims to "inspire [and] educate" writers at different stages in their careers. The conference is conducted on a not-for-profit basis and is planned, organized and run mainly by volunteers. The conference was recognised in 2002 for its international reach, with speakers and attendees from North America, Australasia, Asia, and Europe.

== Conference Format ==
The conference takes place over three days, Friday, Saturday, and Sunday. The conference usually has sessions themed around:

- Workshops
- Master Classes
- Editor/Agent Interviews/pitch appointments
- Informal talks with speakers/panelists
- Trade show
- Saturday Evening Author Signing and Book Fair

== Speakers ==
The conference has booked the following authors as speakers for various past conferences: Terry Brooks, Catherine Coulter, Jennifer Crusie, Robert Dugoni, Hallie Ephron, Diana Gabaldon, Susanna Kearsley, Annabel Lyon, Phillip Margolin, Robert McCammon, Jacqueline Mitchard, Anne Perry, Mary Jo Putney, Karen Robards, John Saul, Robert J. Sawyer, Michael Slade, Meg Tilly, and Jack Whyte.

== Writing Contest ==
The SiWC Writing Contest is held annually and in conjunction with the conference. Prizes are awarded to the winner at the awards ceremony on the first evening of the conference. First place wins $1000, and honorable mentions receive $150. The winner and honorable mentions are published online.

== History ==
The conference first took place at Johnson Heights Secondary School and was attended by just over 100 people. The organizers then began planning for a larger conference the following year. The second conference moved to the Sheraton Guildford Hotel, where it has remained since. The second conference featured author Maeve Binchey as a keynote speaker.

On the tenth anniversary of the conference in 2002, the growth and reach of the conference was recognized by including ‘international’ in the official title to become the Surrey International Writers’ Conference.

The conference operated as an extension of the Surrey School District's Continuing Education department as a non-profit event from its inception up to and including the 2010 conference. It now operates as a not-for-profit society, the Surrey International Writers' Conference Society.
