= Jennifer Crusie =

American novelist

Jennifer Smith
- Born: Jennifer Smith; 1949 (age 76–77); Wapakoneta, Ohio, U.S.
- Education: Wapakoneta High School; Bowling Green State University; Wright State University; Ohio State University (MFA)
- Occupations: Novelist, nonfiction
- Writing career
- Pen name: Jennifer Crusie
- Period: 1992–present
- Genres: Romance, adventure
- Notable works: Getting Rid of Bradley, Bet Me
- Notable awards: RITA award – Short Contemporary Series Romance; 1995 Getting Rid of Bradley; RITA award – Contemporary Single Title; 2005 Bet Me
- Website: www.jennycrusie.com

Jennifer Crusie (born 1949) is a pseudonym for Jennifer Smith, an author of contemporary romance novels. She has written more than twenty novels, which have been published in 20 countries.

== Biography ==
Crusie was born as Jennifer Smith in Wapakoneta, Ohio to Jack and JoAnn Smith. She chose to honor her maternal grandmother by writing under her grandmother's maiden name, Crusie. Crusie has spent much of her life living and working in Ohio and New Jersey, and now lives in Pennsylvania.

=== Education ===
Crusie graduated from Wapakoneta High School, and then earned a bachelor's degree in Art Education from Bowling Green State University in Bowling Green, Ohio. She has a Master's degree from Wright State University in Professional Writing and Women's Literature, her master's thesis, "A Spirit More Capable Of Looking Up To Him," was on the role of women in mystery fiction from 1840 to 1920. Her second master's degree is an MFA in Fiction from Ohio State University. She has also completed all the coursework towards a Ph.D. at Ohio State University.

=== Family and career ===
Crusie married in 1971, and followed her Air Force husband to Wichita Falls, Texas. He was soon transferred to Dayton, Ohio and they have since divorced. They have one daughter.

Crusie's first career was a teacher, beginning with pre-school, then elementary and junior high art, high school English, and undergraduate college English courses, including 15 years in the Beavercreek, Ohio public school system. Her teaching subjects included art, literature, mythology, the Bible in literature, college composition, creative writing, and British and American literature, as well as time spent directing the sets and costumes crews for the high school's drama department. She has also taught at Antioch University, Wright State University, Ohio State, and McDaniel College, where she helped design the curriculum for the graduate level Romance Writing Program.

=== Writing career ===
Crusie's MFA dissertation focused on the impact of gender on narrative strategies. To research the differences in the way men and women tell stories, Crusie read one hundred romance novels written by women, planning on following that by reading one hundred adventure novels written by men. The romance novels were so compelling that Crusie changed her dissertation to focus on romantic fiction and decided to try her hand at writing a romance novel. She quit her job in the summer of 1991 to devote herself full-time to writing. Crusie completed her first manuscript, called Keeping Kate, in 1991, but was unable to sell it. She entered a Silhouette-sponsored novella contest in the winter of 1991 and won one of twelve places with a novel called Sizzle. Shortly after that, Harlequin bought Keeping Kate and changed the name to Manhunting, which was Crusie's first published novel, appearing in February 1993.

For the first three years of Crusie's career, her books were published as category romances under the Silhouette, Harlequin, and Bantam Loveswept lines. In 1995, Crusie signed with St. Martin's Press, and began writing single title novels, beginning with Tell Me Lies. The switch to longer, non-category novels was easy for Crusie, who says that "I was never conscious of writing category or single title or paperback or hardcover. You just have to tell the truest story you know." Her long partnership with her editor, Jennifer Enderlin, made it possible for her to explore many different aspects of storytelling, and Crusie explained the depth of her relationship with her editor in an explanation of why she wasn't self-publishing]: "SMP still excels at the one thing I'd have to work full time to do half as well as they do: Tell people my book is out there. But okay, let's say I could market my own book riding on the coattails of everything my publisher has already established for me. SMP still holds one trump card: Jennifer Enderlin. I don't want to write a book without Jen. She makes me a better writer". After a ten-year hiatus from publishing, Crusie began again in collaboration again with Bob Mayer, experimenting with self-publishing.

Crusie's books are known for their humor, although she says she has never "deliberately written to be funny. ... I think my characters just have a particular kind of sense of humor. They use it the way a lot of people do, to cope with the absurdities of life." Crusie usually envisions her characters before the plots, and she crafts them as real people, complete with flaws. Her heroines are usually off-beat and the heroes are clever and charming. Many of her characters collect things because she believes that a person's possessions tell a lot about that person. She has won the Romance Writers of America Rita Award twice.

In September 2004, Crusie met adventure novelist Bob Mayer at the Maui Writers Conference. By the end of the conference, they had become friends and begun the outline for a novel. Within a year, they had finished the manuscript, collaborating primarily via email. In the novel, Don't Look Down, Crusie wrote the scenes and dialogue for the female protagonist, while Mayer wrote the scenes and dialogue for the male protagonist. Crusie's longtime editor, Jennifer Enderlin, also edited this book, and had to ask Crusie who had written each section as she couldn't tell them apart. The novel was given an initial printing of 300,000 copies, Crusie's highest initial printing to date. In August 2007, their second collaborative novel, Agnes and the Hitman, was released and made the New York Times best seller list. They again partnered up for March 2010's release of Wild Ride. Crusie has also collaborated with Eileen Dreyer and Anne Stuart on The Unfortunate Miss Fortunes (2007), and on Dogs and Goddesses (2009) with Anne Stuart and Lani Diane Rich.

In 2010 Crusie published her first solo in six years, Maybe This Time. This is Crusie's version of Henry James' The Turn of the Screw. In Crusie's version the governess is not young and inexperienced, the children are not perfectly behaved, they are not isolated because house guests keep turning up and moving in, and the faraway guardian turns up and becomes part of the story.

Then in 2022, Crusie and Bob Mayer began writing together again, this time writing three-book limited series. The first - Lavender's Blue, Rest in Pink, and One in Vermillion - came out in 2023 and the second - Rocky Start, Very Nice Funerals, and The Honey Pot Plot - came out in 2024 and early 2025.

She also continues her interest in the academic side of fiction. Early in her academic career, she published a book of literary criticism on Anne Rice under the name Jennifer Smith; and she's been active in pop culture criticism, both on her blog Argh Ink and for Benbella Press, editing three essay collections and contributing to others..

== Bibliography ==
=== Fiction ===
- Sizzle (1994)—Silhouette Stolen Moments Novella ISBN 0-373-83271-0
- Manhunting (Harlequin Temptation #463 September 1993, reissued Mira Books November 2000, reissued in hardcover February 2007) ISBN 0-373-77251-3
- Getting Rid of Bradley (Harlequin Temptation #480 February 1994, reissued Mira Books November 2001) ISBN 1-55166-865-3
- Strange Bedpersons (Harlequin Temptation #520 December 1994, reissued Mira Books December 2003) ISBN 1-55166-743-6
- What the Lady Wants (Harlequin Temptation #544 June 1995, reissued Mira Books November 2002) ISBN 1-55166-951-X
- Charlie All Night (Harlequin Temptation #570 January 1996, reissued Mira Books December 2004) ISBN 0-7783-2107-X
- Anyone But You (Harlequin Love and Laughter #September 4, 1996, reissued Mira Books January 2006, paperback reissue December 2006) ISBN 0-373-77138-X
- The Cinderella Deal (Bantam Loveswept #807 October 1996) ISBN 0-553-44557-X
- Trust Me on This (Bantam Loveswept #843, July 1997) ISBN 0-553-44558-8
- Tell Me Lies (1998) ISBN 0-312-96680-6
- Crazy for You (1999) ISBN 0-312-97112-5
- Welcome to Temptation (2000) ISBN 0-312-97425-6
- Fast Women (2001) ISBN 0-312-98015-9
- Faking It (2002) ISBN 0-312-93278-2
- Bet Me (2004) ISBN 0-312-98785-4
- Don't Look Down (with Bob Mayer) (2006) ISBN 0-312-34812-6
- Agnes and the Hitman (with Bob Mayer) (2007) ISBN 0-312-36304-4
- "Hot Toy" (2006)—in the anthology Santa Baby ISBN 0-312-93976-0
- The Unfortunate Miss Fortunes (2007) (with Anne Stuart, Eileen Dreyer) ISBN 0-312-94098-X
- Dogs and Goddesses (2009) with Anne Stuart and Lani Diane Rich ISBN 0-312-94437-3
- Wild Ride (with Bob Mayer) (2010) ISBN 0-312-53377-2
- Maybe This Time (2010) ISBN 0-312-30378-5
- Lavender's Blue (The Liz Danger Series Book 1) (with Bob Mayer) (2023) ISBN 978-1621253969
- Rest in Pink (The Liz Danger Series Book 2) (with Bob Mayer) (2023) ISBN 978-1621254003
- One in Vermillion (The Liz Danger Series Book 3) (with Bob Mayer) (2023) ISBN 978-1621254034

=== Non-fiction ===
- "Why I Occasionally Think About Not Writing Romance Any More/Why I Know I'll Continue to Write Romance Until They Pry My Cold Dead Fingers from Around My Keyboard" essay in North American Romance Writers (1999, ISBN 0810836041)
- Totally Charmed: Demons, Whitelighters and the Power of Three (2005) (Smart Pop series) ISBN 1-932100-60-1—editor and contributor
- Flirting with Pride & Prejudice: Fresh Perspectives on the Original Chick-Lit Masterpiece (2005) (Smart Pop series) ISBN 1-932100-72-5—editor and contributor
- Anne Rice: A Critical Companion (Critical Companions to Popular Contemporary Writers) (1996) ISBN 0-313-29612-X
- Coffee at Luke's: An Unauthorized Gilmore Girls Gabfest (2007) (Smart Pop Series) ISBN 978-1-933771-17-5

== Awards and reception ==
- 1995 - Romance Writers of America RITA Award, Short Contemporary Series Romance – Getting Rid of Bradley
- 2005 - Romance Writers of America RITA Award, Contemporary Single Title – Bet Me
