= Eileen Dreyer =

American novelist

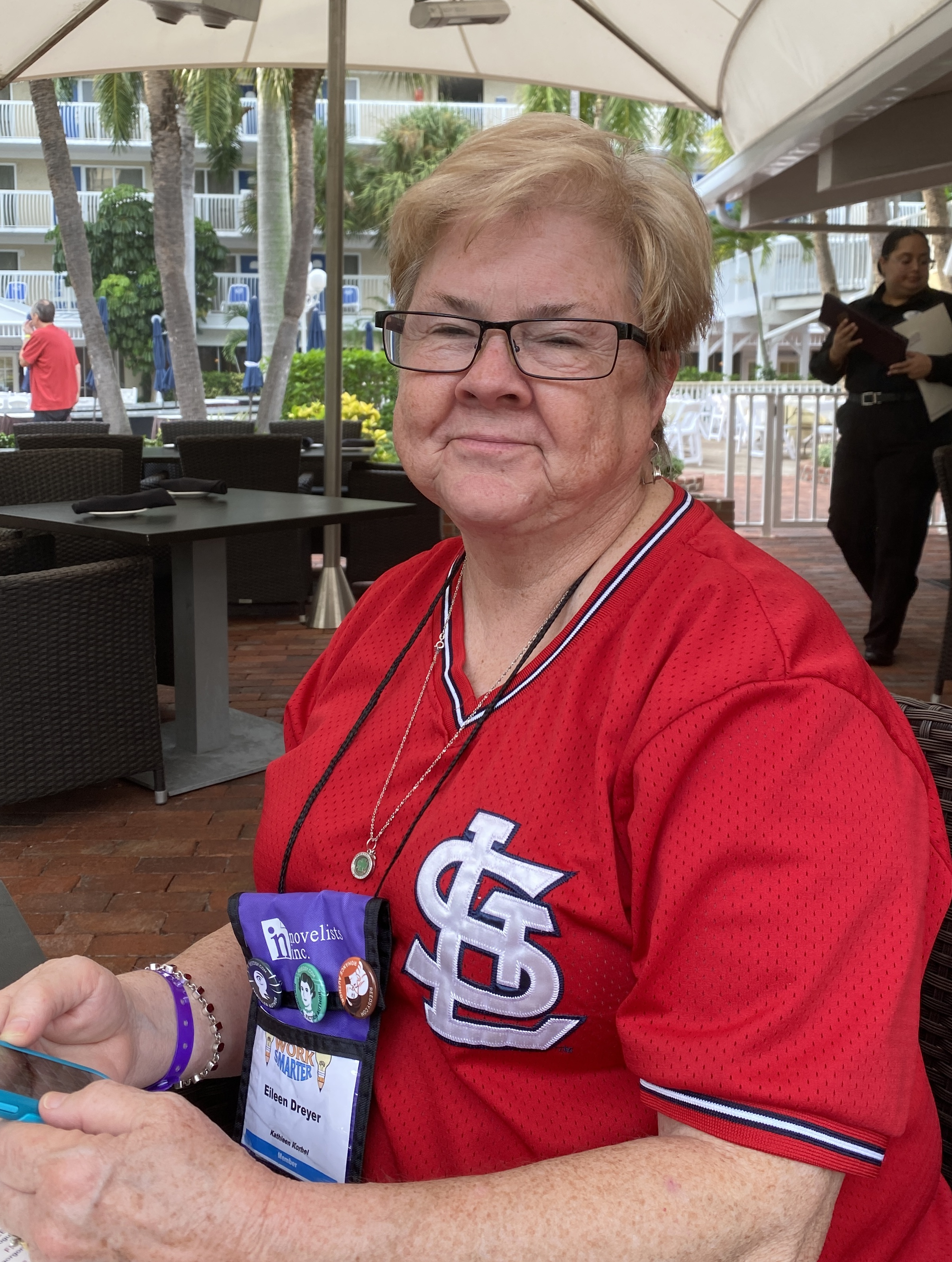
- Dreyer at 2022 NInc
- Born: St. Louis, Missouri, U.S.
- Occupations: Writer, novelist
- Writing career
- Pen name: Eileen Dreyer; Kathleen Korbel
- Period: 1986–present
- Genres: contemporary romance, romantic suspense, Historical romance, paranormal romance,
- Notable works: The Ice Cream Man, Perchance to Dream, A Man to Die For, A Rose for Maggie, A Soldier’s Heart
- Notable awards: RITA award – Long Contemporary Series Romance; 1990 The Ice Cream Man RITA award – Romantic Suspense; 1990 Perchance to Dream; RITA award – Single Title Contemporary Romance; 1992 A Man to Die For; RITA award – Long Contemporary Series Romance; 1992 A Rose for Maggie RITA award – Long Contemporary Series Romance; 1995 A Soldier’s Heart
- Website: eileendreyer.com

Eileen Dreyer is an American author of contemporary romance, historical romance and suspense, and also publishes under the pen name Kathleen Korbel. She is a five-time winner of the Romance Writers of America RITA Award and in 1995 was inducted into the Romance Writers of America Hall of Fame. In 2014, she competed on the TV game show Jeopardy!.

== Biography ==
Dreyer was born in St. Louis, Missouri and at the age of nineteen she began work as a trauma nurse.

She is trained in forensic nursing and death investigation and lives in Brentwood, Missouri with her husband and children. Her great-grandfather was a member of the IRA.

She published her first novel as Kathleen Korbel in 1986, writing for Harlequin's Silhouette category imprint. She said that "as a trauma nurse...she enjoyed writing romance because she liked to see good things happen to people, and scripting the story, she could be sure of that." Having grown up in a non-dysfunctional family, she said that working in the ER helped to show her the definition of a hero. "It constantly amazes me the people I've met who have had terrible things happen to them, but who live their lives well, loving and nurturing those around them. Those are my heroes. People who survive, who thrive, who triumph when there is no way they should."

Dreyer was a contestant on the October 30, 2014, episode of Jeopardy!, though she didn't win. She credited her ability to make it on the show and compete with reading a wide range of genres, but especially romance – "I think I picked up the best information from romance." This was especially true for Final Jeopardy!. As she related in an interview, "So the Final Jeopardy! category was English Monarchs, and I had to place my bet before I knew the answer. I had $6,400 at the time. I bet $6,200 because I had a strong feeling after my own history with historical romance, I would know this one. The answer was, 'The name of two kings, fifth and eighth, who were notable for being king but not crowned.' (Cue music.) And yes, I knew that the two kings, one of the boys Richard III allegedly killed in the Tower, and the king who abdicated for Wallace Simpson, were named Edward. I didn't win. Unfortunately, the other two players knew it, too. But I knew the answer. And I knew it because I read and write historical romance."

== Bibliography ==
=== As Eileen Dreyer ===
==== Drake's Rakes ====
1. Barely a Lady. Grand Central. July 2010 [2010]. ISBN 9780446542081.
2. Never a Gentleman. Grand Central. April 2011 [2011]. ISBN 9780446542067.
3. Always a Temptress. Grand Central. October 2011 [2011]. ISBN 9780446542050.
3.5. It Begins with a Kiss. Grand Central. July 2012 [2012]. ISBN 9781455519316.
4. Once a Rake. Grand Central. November 2013 [2013]. ISBN 9781455519323.
5. Twice Tempted. Grand Central. November 2014 [2014]. ISBN 9781455519347.

==== Molly Burke ====
1. Bad Medicine. HarperCollins. July 1995 [1995]. ISBN 9780061042768.
2. Head Games. St. Martin's. March 2004 [2004]. ISBN 9780312265786.

==== Stand-alone works ====
- A Man to Die For. HarperTorch. June 1991 [1991]. ISBN 9780061040559.
- Dreyer, Eileen (October 1992) [1992]. If Looks Could Kill. ISBN 9781614174851.
- Nothing Personal. HarperTorch. March 1994 [1994]. ISBN 9780061042751.
- Brain Dead. HarperCollins. August 1997 [1997]. ISBN 9780061010958.
- With a Vengeance. St. Martin's. March 2003 [2003]. ISBN 9780312265779.
- Sinners and Saints. St. Martin's. September 2005 [2005]. ISBN 9780312330682.

==== Anthologies ====
- Double Jeopardy. Pocket. May 1996 [1996]. ISBN 9780671896324. in Phyllis A. Whitney Presents Malice Domestic 5
- Variations on a Theme. NAL. April 2000 [2000]. ISBN 9780451200099. in Mothers and Sons

=== As Kathleen Korbel ===
==== Daughters of Myth ====
Paranormal Romance

1. Dangerous Temptation. Silhouette. October 2006 [2006]. ISBN 9780373617494.
2. Dark Seduction. Silhouette. February 2008 [2008]. ISBN 9780373617814.
3. Deadly Redemption. Silhouette. September 2008 [2008]. ISBN 9780373617944.

==== Stand-alone works ====
- Playing the Game. Silhouette. May 1986 [1986]. ISBN 9780373052868.
- A Stranger's Smile. Silhouette. September 1986 [1986]. ISBN 9780373071630.
- Korbel, Kathleen (1996) [1987publisher = Silhouette]. Edge of the World. Silhouette Sensation. ISBN 9780373072224.
- Worth Any Risk. Silhouette. April 1987 [1987]. ISBN 9780373071913.
- A Prince of a Guy. Silhouette. October 1987 [1987]. ISBN 9780373053896.
- The Princess and the Pea. Silhouette. September 1988 [1988]. ISBN 9780373054558.
- Perchance to Dream. Silhouette. January 1989 [1989]. ISBN 9780373072767.
- The Ice Cream Man. Silhouette. November 1989 [1989]. ISBN 9780373073092.
- Hotshot. Silhouette. June 1990 [1990]. ISBN 9780373055821.
- Lightning Strikes. Silhouette. August 1990 [1990]. ISBN 9780373073511.
- A Rose for Maggie. Silhouette. July 1991 [1991]. ISBN 9780373073962.
- A Fine Madness. Silhouette. September 1991 [1991]. ISBN 9780373056682.
- Jake's Way. Silhouette. December 1991 [1991]. ISBN 9780373074136.
- Isn't It Romantic?. Silhouette. 1992. ISBN 9780373586301.
- A Walk on the Wild Side. Silhouette. October 1992 [1992]. ISBN 9780373074570.
- Simple Gifts. Silhouette. May 1994 [1994]. ISBN 9780373075713.
- A Soldier's Heart. Silhouette. October 1994 [1994]. ISBN 9780373076024.
- Don't Fence Me In. Silhouette. July 1996 [1996]. ISBN 9780373760152.
- Sail Away. Silhouette. November 1999 [1999]. ISBN 9780373762545.
- Some Men's Dreams. Silhouette. August 2003 [2003]. ISBN 9780373273072.

==== Anthologies and short stories ====
- The Road to Mandalay. Silhouette. June 1989 [1989]. ISBN 9780373482177. in Silhouette Summer Sizzlers
- Timeless. Silhouette. September 1993 [1993]. ISBN 9780373482634. in Silhouette Shadows '93

=== Non-fiction ===
- "And I Still Write Romance" essay in North American Romance Writers (1999, ISBN 0810836041)

== Awards and reception ==
- 1987 - RT Bookclub named her Best New Contemporary Romance Author
- 1989 - Romantic Times Reviewers' Choice Award for Best Silhouette Desire for Hotshot
- 1990 - Romance Writers of America RITA Award, Long Contemporary Series Romance – The Ice Cream Man
- 1990 - Romance Writers of America RITA Award, Romantic Suspense – Perchance to Dream
- 1992 - Romance Writers of America RITA Award, Single Title Contemporary Romance – A Man to Die For
- 1992 - Romance Writers of America RITA Award, Long Contemporary Series Romance – A Rose for Maggie
- 1993 – Romantic Times Reviewers' Choice Award for Best Series Romance Book of the Year for A Walk on the Wild Side
- 1995 - Romance Writers of America RITA Award, Long Contemporary Series Romance – A Soldier’s Heart
- 1996 – Anthony Award Nominee for Best Paperback Original for Bad Medicine
- 2003 – Romantic Times Reviewers' Choice Award for Best Silhouette Intimate Moments for Some Men's Dreams
- 2003 – Romance Readers Anonymous (RRA) Award for Some Men's Dreams
- 2005 – Romantic Times Career Achievement Award Winner – Suspense
- 2010 – Romantic Times Reviewers' Choice Award for Best Historical for Barely a Lady
- 2014 - Library Journal Top Ten Best Romances of 2014 – Twice Tempted
