= John Gilstrap =

Author

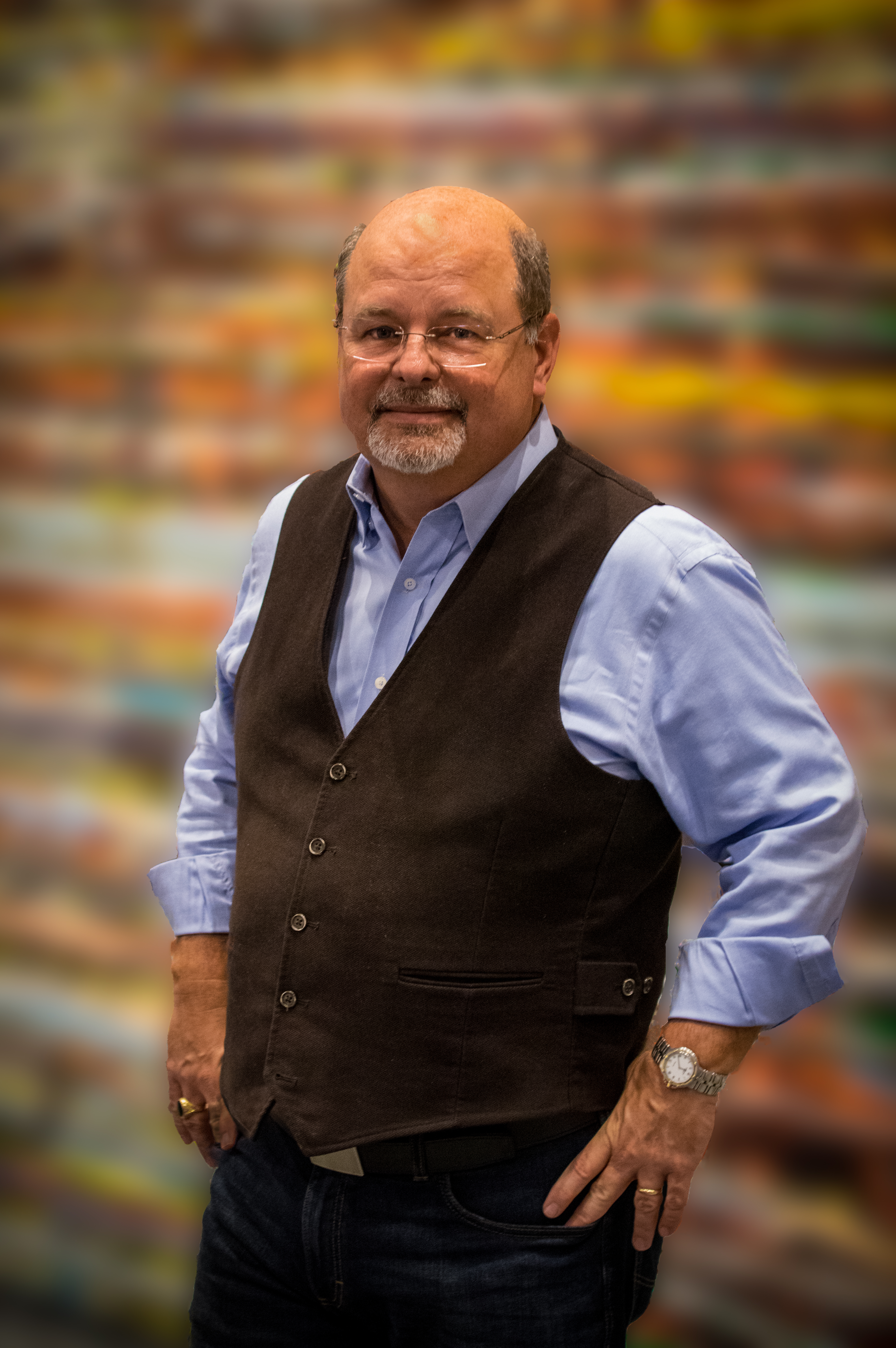
- Born: February 27, 1957 (age 69)
- Education: College of William & Mary; University of Southern California
- Occupations: Writer, public speaker
- Writing career
- Years active: 1995–present
- Genre: Thriller
- Notable works: Nathan's Run; At All Costs; Six Minutes to Freedom the Jonathan Grave thriller series the Victoria Emerson thriller series
- Notable awards: New York Times Bestselling Author, ITW Thriller Award (2016)

John Gilstrap (born February 27, 1957) is an American novelist and a New York Times Bestselling author of over twenty thrillers, including the Jonathan Grave thriller series, which first appeared in 2009. His prior works include five stand-alone novels and one nonfiction thriller about the Delta Force rescue of Kurt Muse.

== Biography ==
John Gilstrap was raised in Northern Virginia, where he attended public school in Fairfax County Public Schools, graduating from Robinson Secondary School in 1975. Gilstrap earned a bachelor's degree in 1979 from the College of William & Mary in Virginia, and a master's degree from University of Southern California in 1983. He lives in Berkeley County, West Virginia and has a YouTube channel where he gives writing advice and insight on the publishing industry.

Prior to his writing career, Gilstrap was a safety engineer specializing in explosives and hazardous materials. He served 15 years in the volunteer fire and rescue service, first with the Burke Volunteer Fire Department in Fairfax County, and later with the Occoquan-Woodbridge-Lorton Volunteer Fire Department in Prince William County, Virginia.

== Books ==
=== Jonathan Grave thrillers ===
- No Mercy (2009)
- Hostage Zero (2010)
- Threat Warning (2011)
- Damage Control (2011)
- High Treason (2013)
- Soft Targets (2013)
- End Game (2014)
- Against All Enemies (2015)
- Friendly Fire (2016)
- Final Target (2017)
- Scorpion Strike (2018)
- Total Mayhem (2019)
- Hellfire (2020)
- Stealth Attack (2021)
- Lethal Game (2022)
- Harm's Way (2023)

=== Nonfiction thrillers ===
- Six Minutes To Freedom (with Kurt Muse) – 2006

=== Standalone thrillers ===
- Nathan's Run (1996)
- At All Costs (1998)
- Even Steven (2000)
- Scott Free (2002)
- Nick of Time (2016)

==== Victoria Emerson thrillers ====
- Crimson Phoenix (2021)
- Blue Fire (2022)
- White Smoke (2023)

=== Screenplays ===
- Word of Honor adapted from the novel by Nelson DeMille
- Young Men and Fire adapted from the book by Norman McLean
- Red Dragon (uncredited) adapted from the novel by Thomas Harris
- Nathan's Run adapted from the novel by John Gilstrap
