= Bob Mayer (author) =

American writer (born 1959)

- Born: Robert John Mayer; October 21, 1959 (age 66) New York City, U.S.
- Occupation: novelist; speaker; publisher
- Education: United States Military Academy
- Period: 1991–present
- Genre: Science fiction; thriller; historical; romance

Website
- bobmayer.com

Robert Mayer (born October 21, 1959) is a New York Times-bestselling author and the CEO of Cool Gus Publishing. He is a West Point graduate and former Green Beret. Mayer has authored over 60 novels in multiple genres, selling more than 4 million books, including the #1 series Area 51, Atlantis, and The Green Berets. He has written under the pen names Joe Dalton, Robert Doherty, Greg Donegan, and Bob McGuire. He holds the distinction of being the only male author on the Romance Writers of America Honor Roll.

== Early life ==
Robert John "Bob" Mayer was born in the Bronx, New York City on October 21, 1959. After high school, Mayer was accepted to the United States Military Academy at West Point. There, he graduated with honors in the top 10 percent of his class, earning a BA in psychology in 1981. He later earned a master's degree in education at Austin Peay State University.

In the Army, Mayer served in the infantry with the 1st Cavalry Division, later as platoon leader and a brigade recon platoon leader. He joined Special Forces and commanded a Green Berets A-Team from 1984 to 1988. He served as the operations officer for 2nd Battalion, 10th Special Forces Group (Airborne) and with Special Operations Command (Special Projects) in Hawaii. He later taught Green Beret recruits at the John F. Kennedy Special Warfare Center and School in Fort Bragg, NC.

Mayer is an honor graduate of the Special Forces Qualification Course, the John F. Kennedy Special Warfare Center and School Instructor Training Course and the Danish Royal Navy Fromandkorpset. He is a Master Parachutist/Jumpmaster Qualified and graduated from the International Mountain Climbing School. He has completed 14 marathons, including qualifying for the Boston Marathon and running it three times.

== Writing career ==
Mayer's prolific writing encompasses both his military experience and his fascination for history, legends and mythology. To date, he has published over 65 titles. Though most of his novels reside within the realm of science fiction, he has crossed successfully into multiple genres including historical, military, suspense, young adult and romance. His books have hit on numerous bestselling lists including The New York Times, USA Today, The Wall Street Journal, and Publishers Weekly.

Mayer began his writing career in 1991 with the Green Beret novel Eyes of the Hammer. The next year, he followed with his second novel, Dragon Sim-13. A total of 9 books have been written in the series.

In 1997, under his pen name Robert Doherty, Mayer released Area 51. He wrote eight sequels to Area 51 from 1998 to 2004. Four more were published from 2018 to 2020.

In September 2004, Mayer met romance novelist Jennifer Crusie at a writer's conference in Maui. The pair collaborated on a series of military-themed romance novels, including Don't Look Down (2006), Agnes and the Hitman (2007), and Wild Ride (2009). Mayer and Crusie's collaborations took place via email, with Mayer writing from the male perspective and Crusie writing those scenes that involved the female perspective. Agnes and the Hitman became a NYT bestseller, earning Mayer a spot on the Romance Writers of America Honor Roll.

In 2009, Mayer realized a digital transition in the publishing industry was happening. Along with Jen Talty, Mayer formed Cool Gus Publishing (formerly Who Dares Wins Publishing) in 2010 as a platform to reissue his extensive backlist. Cool Gus Publishing authors currently include Colin Falconer, Jennifer Probst, Janice Maynard, and Amy Shojai.

Mayer has also written five books in the Nightstalkers series for the Amazon Publishing imprint 47North.

In addition to his writing and publishing career, Mayer has been a speaker at the Maui Writer's Conference. He holds workshops and seminars on the leadership tactics learned in his Green Beret training. He has been featured in The Wall Street Journal, Forbes, Sports Illustrated, PBS, NPR, the Military Channel and the SyFy Channel.

== Personal life ==
Bob Mayer lives in Tennessee with his wife and their English Yellow Lab, Cool Gus and their newest addition, Scout the dog. His most recent books include the Time Patrol series, featuring characters from both The Nightstalkers and The Cellar series of books.

== Bibliography ==
=== Fiction ===
Title	As by...	Publisher	Date	ISBN	Notes
The Rock	Robert Doherty	Dell	December 1995	0-440-22072-6	Revised and republished in 2010.
The Line	Bob McGuire	St. Martin's Press	December 1996	0-312-95874-9	Black Ops, Book 1; Revised and republished in 2013.
The Gate	Bob McGuire	St. Martin's Press	September 1997	0-312-96278-9	Black Ops, Book 2; Revised and republished in 2015.
The Omega Missile	Joe Dalton	St. Martin's Press	September 1998	0-312-96660-1	Revised and republished in 2011.
The Omega Sanction	Joe Dalton	St. Martin's Press	November 1999	0-312-97188-5	Revised and republished in 2011.
Psychic Warrior	Robert Doherty	Dell	August 2000	0-440-23625-8	Psychic Warrior, Book 1; Revised and republished in 2012
Project Aura	Robert Doherty	Dell	August 7, 2001	0-440-23626-6	Psychic Warrior, Book 2; Revised and republished in 2013
Bodyguard of Lies	Robert Doherty	Forge Books	March 1, 2005	0-7653-1126-7	The Cellar, Book 1; Revised and republished in 2013
Section Eight	Robert Doherty	HarperTorch	September 27, 2005	978-0-06-073583-8	Jim Vaughn, Book 1; Revised and republished in 2015.
The Citadel	Robert Doherty	HarperTorch	March 27, 2007	978-0-06-073585-2	Jim Vaughn, Book 2
Lost Girls	Robert Doherty	Forge Books	August 21, 2007	978-0-7653-1127-6	The Cellar, Book 2; Revised and republished in 2013
Don't Look Down	Bob Mayer	St. Martin's Press	April 4, 2006	978-0-312-34812-0	with Jennifer Crusie
Agnes and the Hitman	Bob Mayer	St. Martin's Press	August 21, 2007	978-0-312-36304-8	with Jennifer Crusie
Wild Ride	Bob Mayer	St. Martin's Press	March 16, 2010	978-0-312-53377-9	with Jennifer Crusie
I, Judas: The Fifth Gospel	Bob Mayer	Cool Gus	July 5, 2012	978-1-62125-003-6	
The Jefferson Allegiance	Bob Mayer	Cool Gus	August 23, 2013	978-1-935712-71-8	Presidential Series novel
The Kennedy Endeavor	Bob Mayer	Cool Gus	December 8, 2013	978-1-62125-114-9	Presidential Series novel
Burners	Bob Mayer	Cool Gus	October 6, 2015	978-1-62125-256-6	Burners novel
Prime	Bob Mayer	Cool Gus	December 22, 2015	978-1-62125-260-3	Burners novel

==== The Green Berets (1991–2024) ====
Featuring the United States Army Special Forces, known colloquially as The Green Berets. Organized into three sub-series by readers.

===== Dave Riley novels =====
Novels featuring protagonist Dave Riley. Published by Presidio Press. Not all printings include a number stamp.

No.	Title	Date	ISBN
1	Eyes of the Hammer	July 1991	0-89141-414-2
2	Dragon SIM-13	August 1992	0-89141-415-0
3	Synbat	December 1993	0-89141-416-9
4	Cut-Out	June 1995	0-89141-508-4
5	Eternity Base	May 1996	0-89141-509-2
6	Z: A Dave Riley Novel	December 1996	0-89141-510-6

===== Horace Chase novels =====
Novels featuring protagonist Horace Chase. Volume numbers continue from the Dave Riley series. Published by Cool Gus. Not all printings include a number stamp.

No.	Title	Date	ISBN
7	Chasing the Ghost	October 8, 2012	978-1-935712-08-4
8	Chasing the Lost	April 23, 2013	978-1-62125-068-5
9	Chasing the Son	May 5, 2015	978-1-62125-185-9

===== Will Kane novels =====
Featuring protagonist Will Kane. Published by Cool Gus. Marketed as The Green Berets: Will Kane. Not all printings include a number stamp.

No.	Title	Date	ISBN
1	New York Minute	June 24, 2019	978-1-62125-335-8
2	Lawyers, Guns and Money	August 29, 2019	978-1-62125-337-2
3	Walk on the Wild Side	November 19, 2019	978-1-62125-340-2
4	Hell of a Town	June 9, 2020	978-1-62125-347-1
5	No Quarter	June 25, 2021	978-1-62125-354-9
6	Shelter from the Storm	March 25, 2024	978-1-62125-410-2

==== Area 51 (1997–2020) ====
Area 51 military science fiction series as by 'Robert Doherty'. Originally published by Dell. The series was revised and reprinted by Cool Gus beginning in 2014. Not all printings include a number stamp.

No.	Title	Date	ISBN	ISBN (rev. ed.)
1	Area 51	February 1997	0-440-22073-4	978-1-62125-218-4
2	The Reply	February 1998	0-440-22378-4	978-1-62125-219-1
3	The Mission	January 1999	0-440-22381-4	978-1-62125-220-7
4	The Sphinx	February 2000	0-440-23494-8	978-1-62125-221-4
5	The Grail	February 2001	0-440-23495-6	978-1-62125-222-1
6	Excalibur	March 2002	0-440-23705-X	978-1-62125-223-8
7	The Truth	January 2003	0-440-23706-8	978-1-62125-224-5
8	Nosferatu	July 2003	0-440-23724-6	978-1-62125-225-2
9	Legend	March 2004	0-440-23725-4	978-1-62125-226-9
10	Redemption	April 8, 2018	978-1-62125-314-3	—
11	Invasion	June 22, 2018	978-1-62125-317-4	—
12	Interstellar	April 26, 2019	978-1-62125-333-4	—
13	Earth Abides	April 2, 2020	978-1-62125-346-4	—

===== The Nightstalkers (2012–2015) =====
Area 51: The Nightstalkers military science fiction series as by 'Bob Mayer'. Not all printings include a number stamp.

No.	Title	Date	ISBN
1	Nightstalkers	December 11, 2012	978-1-61218-583-5
2	The Book of Truths	July 30, 2013	978-1-4778-0729-3
3	The Rift	February 25, 2015	978-1-4778-1811-4
4	Time Patrol	February 24, 2015	978-1-4778-2187-9

===== Time Patrol (2015–2020) =====
The series began as Area 51: Time Patrol. Later editions moved away from the Area 51 premise. Printings do not include number stamps. Mayer includes Time Patrol (2015) as the first novel in the series.

No.	Title	Date	ISBN
1	Time Patrol	February 24, 2015	978-1-4778-2187-9
2	Black Tuesday	August 25, 2015	978-1-5039-4663-7
3	Ides of March	March 15, 2016	978-1-62125-272-6
4	D-Day	May 23, 2016	978-1-62125-277-1
5	Independence Day	July 4, 2016	978-1-62125-284-9
6	Nine Eleven	September 11, 2016	978-1-62125-290-0
7	The Fifth Floor	November 17, 2016	978-1-62125-299-3
8	Valentine's Day	July 24, 2017	978-1-62125-308-2
9	All Hallow's Eve	September 21, 2017	978-1-62125-312-9
10	Equinox	September 14, 2020	978-1-62125-349-5

==== Atlantis (1999–2003) ====
Military science fiction series as by 'Greg Donegan' and later 'Robert Doherty'. Originally published by Berkley. The series was revised and reprinted by Cool Gus beginning in 2010 with the release of Battle for Atlantis. Not all printings include a number stamp.

No.	Title	Date	ISBN	ISBN (rev. ed.)
1	Atlantis	June 1999	0-425-16936-7	978-0-9842575-8-4
2	Bermuda Triangle	May 2000	0-425-17429-8	978-0-9842575-4-6
3	Devil's Sea	February 2001	0-425-17859-5	978-0-9842575-5-3
4	Atlantis Gate	August 6, 2002	0-425-18572-9	978-0-9842575-6-0
5	Assault on Atlantis	October 28, 2003	0-515-13630-1	978-0-9842575-9-1
6	Battle for Atlantis	February 3, 2003	0-425-19453-1	978-1-935712-00-8

==== Shadow Warriors (2011–2018) ====
Revised editions bundled as the Shadow Warriors series. Novels were previously marketed as part of the Final Gambit, Black Ops, Black Ops: Shadow Warriors series.

Title	Date	ISBN (rev. ed.)	Notes
The Line	September 16, 2013	978-0-9842575-3-9	Black Ops, Book 1; Revised edition of The Line (1996)
The Gate	December 15, 2015	978-1-62125-341-9	Black Ops, Book 2; Revised edition of The Gate (1997)
Omega Missle	October 22, 2011	978-1-62125-307-5	Revised edition of The Omega Missle (1998)
Omega Sanction	November 5, 2018	978-1-935712-94-7	Revised edition of The Omega Sanction (1999)
Section Eight	January 6, 2013	978-1-4954-1711-5	Jim Vaughn, Book 2; Revised edition of Section Eight (2005)

==== Duty, Honor, Country (2013–14) ====
Published as ebook exclusives.

No.	Title	Date	ISBN
1	Duty	February 18, 2013	978-1-62125-168-2
2	Honor	January 21, 2014	978-1-62125-149-1
3	Country	January 21, 2014	978-1-62125-150-7

=== Non-fiction ===
Title	Publisher	Date	ISBN	Notes
The Fiction Writer's Toolkit	Open Road	June 2001	0-7592-1436-0	Revised as The Novel Writer's Toolkit
The Novel Writer's Toolkit	Writer's Digest	August 2003	1-58297-261-3	
Hunting Al Qaeda	Zenith Press	July 29, 2005	0-7603-2252-X	Credited as editor in some printings
Who Dares Wins	Pocket Books	June 2, 2009	978-1-4165-9308-9	
Warrior Writer	Cool Gus	March 8, 2010	978-0-9842575-7-7	Revised as Write It Forward
Write It Forward	Cool Gus	July 11, 2011	978-1-935712-67-1	with Jen Taity; Also known as Writer's Conference Guide
The Shelfless Book	Cool Gus	November 26, 2012	978-1-935712-86-2	with Jen Taity; Also known as How We Made Our First Million on Kindle
The Green Beret Suvival Guide	Cool Gus	December 17, 2012	978-1-62125-047-0	Republished under various titles
Shit Doesn't Just Happen	Cool Gus	August 31, 2014	978-1-62125-207-8	
Shit Doesn't Just Happen II	Cool Gus	September 25, 2014	978-1-62125-215-3	
Prepare Now Survive Later	Cool Gus	December 8, 2016	978-1-62125-303-7	Republished under various titles
Survive Now Thrive Later	Cool Gus	December 8, 2016	978-1-62125-305-1	Republished under various titles

== Notes ==
- "Is there gold in your backlist? Self-publish and find out!" by Alan Rinzler Forbes 5/18/11
