= Virginia Henley =

British-Canadian writer

Virginia Syddall Henley
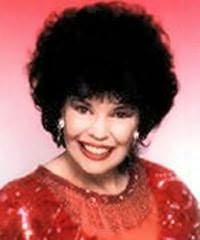
- Born: Virginia Syddall; 5 December 1935 (age 90); Bolton, England
- Citizenship: Canada
- Occupation: novelist
- Spouse: Arthur Henley
- Children: 2
- Writing career
- Pen name: Virginia Henley
- Period: 1982 - Present
- Genres: Romance, Historical, Erotica
- Website: virginiahenley.com

Virginia Henley (née Virginia Syddall; born 5 December 1935 in Bolton, England), is a British-Canadian writer of historical-romance novels. She is well known for her Medieval, Renaissance and other period piece romance novels.

== Biography ==
Virginia Syddall was born on 5 December 1935 in Bolton, England. Her mother, Lillian Syddall, taught her to love history.

Virginia married Arthur Henley in 1956 and remained together until he died in 2013. They had two sons, Sean and Adam; four grandchildren, Daryl, Michael, Tara and Ryan; and three great grandchildren, Aireanna, Elizabeth and Faelynn. The marriage took place in Grimsby, Ontario, where she was a housewife, who read The Wolf and the Dove by Kathleen E. Woodiwiss, and decided to start to write. She sold her first novel The Irish Gypsy in 1982 to Avon Books.

She became a friend of other prominent writers such as Kathleen E. Woodiwiss, Bertrice Small, Heather Graham Pozzessere, Kat Martin, Christina Skye, Marsha Canham and Susan Johnson.

Now retired, she lives in Alberta.

== Writing career ==
Virginia Henley is the author of thirty historical novels, including The New York Times bestsellers Seduced and Desired, and three novellas. Her work has been translated into fourteen languages.

=== Style ===
Virginia Henley's novels are not typical 'bodice rippers' - attention is paid to details such as historical events, which are integrated seamlessly into an otherwise fictional story. This attention to historical details is a hallmark of her novels. From the practices and traditions of the day, to the trends in fashion and down to the lives of prominent families in history - Henley combines them to create a rich background for her characters. Apart from the male and female protagonists, Henley's romance novels also contain colorful supporting characters, each with their own adventures and romances which at times even rival those of the main protagonists.

Henley has won several awards for her work - including the Romantic Times Lifetime Achievement Award, Waldenbooks' Bestselling Award, Maggie Award for Excellence from the Georgia Romance Writers. She is also regularly praised and given rave reviews by Affaire de Coeur, Heartland Critiques, Rendezvous and USA Today.

=== Publishing houses ===
Virginia Henley first published her books under Dell Publishing. From the 1980s to 1992, all her novels were published by Dell. In 1993, Island Books, a division of Dell Books, began publishing her works. There are marked differences between Henley's books published by Dell and those published by Island Books. The novels published by Dell had illustrated cover pages, with a plot synopsis on the back cover. The books published by Island had only her name and the novel's title over a background image of a particular flower with the illustration appearing on the second page.

== Bibliography ==
=== Single novels ===
- The Irish Gypsy (1982) = Enticed (1994)
- Bold Conquest (1983)
- Wild Hearts (1985)
- The Raven and the Rose (1987)
- The Hawk and the Dove (1988)
- The Pirate and the Pagan (1990)
- Seduced (1994)
- Desired (1995)
- Enslaved (1995)
- Dream Lover (1997)
- A Woman of Passion (1998) Based on the life of Bess of Hardwick
- Ravished (2002)
- Undone (2003)
- Insatiable (2004)
- Unmasked (2005)

=== Medieval Plantagenet Trilogy ===
1. The Falcon and the Flower (1989)
2. The Dragon and the Jewel (1991)
3. The Marriage Prize (2000)

=== Clan Kennedy Saga ===
1. Tempted (1992)
2. The Border Hostage (2001)

=== De Warenne Family Saga ===
1. A Year and A Day (1998)
2. Infamous (2006)
3. Notorious (2007)

=== The Peer of the Realm Saga ===
1. The Decadent Duke (2008)
2. The Irish Duke (2010)
3. The Dark Earl (2011)

=== Omnibus in Collaborations ===
- "Christmas Eve" in A Gift of Joy (1995) (with Jo Goodman, Brenda Joyce and Fern Michaels)
- "Letter of love" in Love's Legacy (1996) (with Madeline Baker, Mary Balogh, Elaine Barbieri, Lori Copeland, Cassie Edwards, Heather Graham, Catherine Hart, Penelope Neri, Diana Palmer and Janelle Taylor)
- "Love and joy" in A Christmas Miracle (1996) (with Katherine Kingsley, Stephanie Mittman and Rebecca Paisley)
- "Christmas Eve" in Let It Snow (2003) (with Holly Chamberlin, Marcia Evanick and Fern Michaels)
- "Christmas Eve" in Deck the Halls (2004) (with Marcia Evanick, Lisa Jackson, Fern Michaels and Linda Lael Miller)
- "Smuggler's Lair" in Lords of Desire (2009) (with Kristi Astor, Victoria Dahl and Sally MacKenzie)
- "Beauty and the Brute" in Lords of Passion (2010) (with Kate Pearce, and Maggie Robinson)

=== Kindle e-books from Amazon ===
- "Master of Paradise" (2011)
- "Hot as Fire" (2011) [Christmas Eve renamed]
- "A Rough Wooing" (2012)
- "Scandal by the Ton" (2013)

== Awards ==
- 1988 Winner of the Romantic Times Award for Best Elizabethan Historical Romance by The Hawk and the Dove
- 1989 Winner of the Romantic Times Award for Most Sensual by The Falcon and the Flower
- 1990 Winner of the Romantic Times Award for Best English Historical Romance by The Pirate and the Pagan
- Romantic Times Lifetime Achievement Award
- Waldenbooks' Bestselling Award
- Affaire de Coeur
- Heartland Critiques
- Maggie Award for Excellence from the Georgia Romance Writers
- Rendezvous Award
- USA Today Award

== References or sources ==
- Virginia Henley's official website
