= Katherine Sutcliffe =

American novelist

- Born: 1952 (age 73–74) Texas, U.S.
- Occupation: Novelist
- Period: 1986–present
- Genre: historical romance, romantic suspense

Katherine Sutcliffe (born 1952) is an American author of romance novels. Many of her books are considered to be "dark" romances, examining issues traditionally not mentioned in the romance genre.

== Biography ==
Katherine Sutcliffe was born an only child in East Texas. After working for a time at an oil company and as a headhunter for a computer personnel company, Sutcliffe decided in 1982 to quit her job and attempt to write a novel. Three years later she sold her first book, Desire and Surrender to Avon Books. She works eight hours a day, five to seven months a year. Sutcliffe also attempts to find a single CD that will provide inspiration during the writing of each book. In the past, she has used the soundtrack to Somewhere in Time and Kitarō's Silk Road.

In 1995 and 1996, Sutcliffe worked as the Consultant Head Writer for the soap operas As the World Turns and Another World. Sutcliffe was offered the job after Bill Graham, who searched for writers for Procter & Gamble, mentioned to his wife that they wanted to refocus the soap opera stories on romance. His wife, who loved Sutcliffe's book, insisted that he contact her. During her time as a soap opera writer, she concentrated on developing the six-month story lines, which the breakdown writers would then develop into dialogue and individual scenes for the show. During this time frame, Sutcliffe also made a guest appearance on Another World, playing herself. She resigned from her position after the networks began to insist that she move to New York City to be more accessible.

Her historical romance, Notorious, sold out its first printing in a mere four days.

Sutcliffe lives near Dallas, Texas. She met her husband, an English geologist, while they worked for the same oil company. They have three children, Bryan, Rachel, and Lauren. Sutcliffe also raises and shows Arabian horses.

== Awards ==
- Romantic Times Career Achievement Award for Storyteller of the Year
- Romance Writers of America Write Touch Readers Award for Best Historical of the Year
- Reviewers' International Organization's Dorothy Parker Award for Best Romantic Suspense of 2001, Darkling I Listen
- Francis Reader's Award for Best Romantic Suspense of 2001, Darkling I Listen
- Romantic Times Award Winner in January 2004 for Obsession
- Romance Writers of America RITA Finalist for Best Romantic Suspense of 2001, Darkling I Listen
- Daphe du Maurier Finalist for Best Single Title Romantic Suspense of 2001, Darkling I Listen

== Bibliography ==
=== de Batistas ===
- Desire and Surrender (1986)
- Renegade Love (1989)
- Jezebel (1997)

=== Hawthornes ===
- Miracle (1995)
- Devotion (1996)
- Obsession (2004)

=== Novels ===
- Windstorm (1987)
- A Heart Possessed (1988)
- Fire in the Heart (1990)
- Shadow Play (1991)
- Love's Illusion (1991)
- Dream Fever (1991)
- My Only Love (1993)
- Once a Hero (1994)
- Hope and Glory (1999)
- Whitehorse (1999)
- Notorious (2000)
- Darkling I Listen (2001)
- Fever (2001)
- Bad Moon Rising (2003)

=== Omnibus ===
- Tis the Season (1997) (with Elaine Coffman, Lisa Jackson, Kat Martin)
- Secret Valentines (1998) (with Kate Freiman, Rachel Lee, Sherry Lewis)
- Moonglow (1998) (with Lindsay Longford, Angie Ray, Maggie Shayne)
- Five Golden Rings (2000) (with Jo Beverley, Brenda Joyce, Fern Michaels)
- Lover Beware (2003) (with Fiona Brand, Christine Feehan and Eileen Wilks)

== Sources ==
- Engle, Jamie. "Interview with Katherine Sutcliffe". Bookreporter.com.
- W., Angela (March 2000). "Interview with Katherine Sutcliffe". Die Romantische Bucherecke. Archived from the original on September 28, 2007.
- Sutcliffe, Katherine. "KATHERINE SUTCLIFF ON WRITING DARK ROMANCES". Romantic Times Magazine. Archived from the original on 2006-10-28.
- Gold, Laurie (1998-02-25). "Laurie's News and Views, Issue 47". All About Romance.
- Ward, Jean Marie (1998). "Interview with Katherine Sutcliffe". Crescent Blues.
