= Christmas Angel =

Christmas angels, in general, are small wooden figures portraying angels often playing instruments.

Christmas Angel(s), A Christmas Angel or The Christmas Angel may refer to:

- Gabriel, the angel of the Nativity of Jesus
- Tree-topper, in the form of an angel

== Film ==
- The Christmas Angel, a 1904 French silent film
- The Christmas Angel: A Story on Ice, a 1998 American television film directed by Andy Picheta
- Christmas Angel, a 2009 American film featuring Bruce Davison
- Christmas Angel, a 2012 American television film directed by Brian Herzlinger
- Christmas Angel, a 2023 American television film featuring Skyh Black and Elise Neal

== Television ==
=== Episodes ===
- "The Christmas Angel", Little Men season 1, episode 6 (1998)
- "The Christmas Angel", The Eve Arden Show episode 14 (1957)

=== Shows ===
- A Christmas Angel, a 1992 Canadian animated television special based on the comic strip For Better or For Worse

== Literature ==
- Christmas Angel, an 1885 novel by Benjamin Leopold Farjeon
- The Christmas Angel, a 1900 novel by Katharine Pyle
- The Christmas Angel, a 1910 novel by Abbie Farwell Brown
- The Christmas Angels (German: Die Weihnachtsengelein), a 1940 children's book by Else Wenz-Viëtor
- The Christmas Angel, a 1989 play by James DeVita
- Christmas Angel, a 1992 novel by Jo Beverly, the third installment in the Company of Rogues series
- Christmas Angel, a 1993 novel by Shannon Waverly
- Christmas Angels, a 1996 omnibus of three novels by Debbie Macomber, consisting of A Season of Angels (1993), The Trouble with Angels (1994) and Touched by Angels (1995)
- Christmas Angel, a 1997 novel by Kat Martin
- Those Christmas Angels, a 2003 novel by Debbie Macomber; the fifth installment in the Angels Everywhere series
- The Christmas Angel, a 2005 novel by Thomas Kinkade and Katherine Spencer
- The Christmas Angel, a 2006 children's book by Hans Wilhelm
- Christmas Angel, a 2009 e-book novel by Opal Carew, writing as Amber Carew
- The Christmas Angel, a 2013 novel by Jane Maas
- Christmas Angels, a 2017 novel by Nadine Dorries; the fourth installment in the Lovely Lane series

== Music ==
- The Christmas Angel: A Family Story, a 1998 album by Mannheim Steamroller
- Christmas Angel, a 2008 album, or its title song, by Tamara Gee

== See also ==
- The Christmas Anna Angel, a 1944 picture book by Ruth Sawyer
- Christmas Angels, a 1997 EP by Clannad
- Angela's Christmas, a 2017 animated short film
