= Debbie Macomber bibliography =

Books by Debbie Macomber

Debbie Macomber
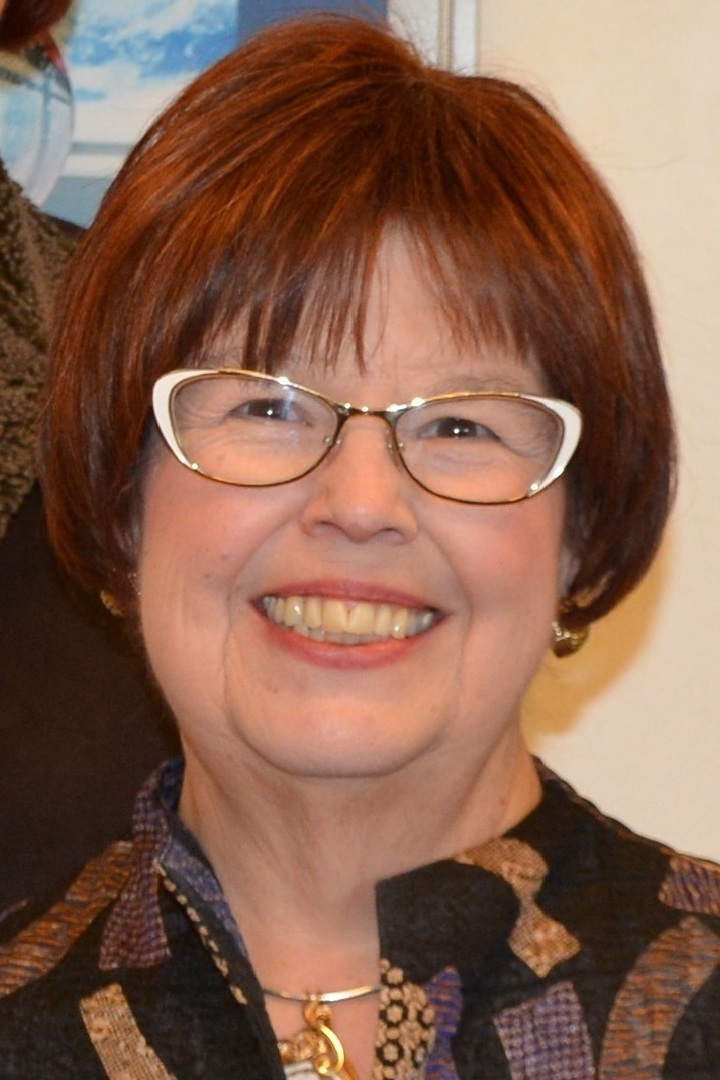
- Macomber at a 2016 book signing
- Born: October 22, 1948 (age 78); Yakima, Washington, U.S.
- Occupation: Author
- Writing career
- Period: 1983–present
- Genres: Romance; women's fiction

Signature
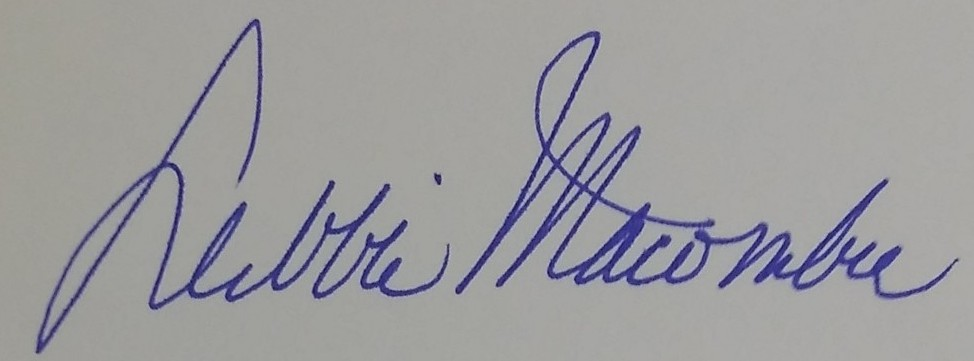

The following is a list of books by Debbie Macomber, an American author of romance novels and contemporary women's fiction.

== Fiction ==
=== Angels Everywhere series ===
1. A Season of Angels, HarperCollins (1993)
2. The Trouble with Angels, HarperCollins (1994)
3. Touched by Angels, HarperCollins (1995)
4. Shirley, Goodness and Mercy, MIRA (1999)
5. Those Christmas Angels, Harlequin Books (2003)
6. Where Angels Go: When Christmas Comes (2007)
7. Angels at the Table, Random House Publishing Group (2012)

The above books were also reissued in the following publications:

- Christmas Angels, Harper/Avon (1996/1998) — Reissue of Touched by Angels, The Trouble With Angels, and A Season of Angels)
- A Gift to Last, MIRA Books (2002) — Reissue of Can This Be Christmas? and Shirley, Goodness, and Mercy)
- Angels Everywhere, Harper/Avon (2002) — Reissue of A Season of Angels and Touched By Angels)
- Angels at Christmas, MIRA Books (2009) — Reissue of Those Christmas Angels and Where Angels Go)

=== Blossom Street series ===
1. The Shop on Blossom Street, MIRA Books (2004)
2. A Good Yarn, MIRA Books (2005)
3. Susannah's Garden, MIRA Books May (2006)
4. Christmas Letters, Mira Books (2006)
5. Back on Blossom Street, MIRA Books (2007)
6. Twenty Wishes, MIRA Books (2008)
7. Summer on Blossom Street, May (2009)
8. Hannah's List, April (2010)
9. A Turn in the Road, MIRA Books (2011)
10. Starting Now, Ballantine (2013)
11. Blossom Street Brides, March (2014)

=== Cedar Cove ===
These series take place in the fictional community of Cedar Cove.

==== Cedar Cove series ====
1. 16 Lighthouse Road, MIRA Books (2001)
2. 204 Rosewood Lane, MIRA Books (2002)
3. 311 Pelican Court, MIRA Books (2003)
4. 44 Cranberry Point, MIRA Books (2004)
5. 50 Harbor Street, MIRA Books (2005)
6. 6 Rainier Drive, MIRA Books (2006)
7. 74 Seaside Avenue, MIRA Books (2007)
8. 8 Sandpiper Way, MIRA Books (2008)
9. 92 Pacific Boulevard, MIRA Books (2009)
10. 1022 Evergreen Place (2010)
11. 1105 Yakima Street, MIRA Books (2011)
12. 1225 Christmas Tree Lane, MIRA Books (2011)

Macomber also wrote the following Christmas books in the Cedar Cove universe:

- A Cedar Cove Christmas, MIRA Books (2008)
- A Merry Little Christmas, MIRA Books (2012)

The above books were also reissued in the following publications:

- Christmas in Cedar Cove, MIRA Books (2010) — Omnibus: 5-B Poppy Lane, (2006) and A Cedar Cove Christmas, (2008)

==== Rose Harbor series ====
The Rose Harbor series takes place in Cedar Cove with a new cast of characters but with returning favorites from the original series.

1. When First They Met, (2012) (e-book and included in the mass-market paperback version of The Inn at Rose Harbor)
2. The Inn at Rose Harbor, (2012) (em Português: A Pousada Rose Harbor)
3. Lost and Found in Cedar Cove, (2013) (e-book)
4. Rose Harbor in Bloom, (2013)
5. Love Letters, Ballantine Books (2014)
6. Falling for Her, (2015)
7. Silver Linings, (2015)
8. Sweet Tomorrows, Ballantine Books (2016)

=== Dakota series ===
1. Dakota Born, MIRA Books(2000)
2. Dakota Home, MIRA Books(2000)
3. Always Dakota, MIRA Books(2001)
4. Buffalo Valley, MIRA Books (2001)
5. Dakota Farm, MIRA Books (2013)

=== Deliverance Company series ===
1. Someday Soon, Harper/Avon (1995)
2. Sooner or Later, Harper/Avon (1996)
3. The Sooner The Better, (1998)
4. Moon Over Water / The Sooner the Better, MIRA Books (1999)/2003

=== From This Day Forward ===
1. Groom Wanted, Silhouette Special Edition (1993)
2. Bride Wanted, Silhouette Special Edition (1993)
3. Marriage Wanted, Silhouette Special Edition (1993)

=== Heart of Texas series ===
1. Lonesome Cowboy, Harlequin Romance (1998)
2. Texas Two-Step, Harlequin Romance (1998)
3. Caroline's Child, Harlequin Romance (1998)
4. Dr. Texas, Harlequin Romance (1998)
5. Nell's Cowboy, Harlequin Romance (1998)
6. Lone Star Baby, Harlequin Romance (1998)
7. Promise, Texas, MIRA Books(1999)
8. Return to Promise, MIRA Books(2000)

The above books were also reissued in the following publications:

- Heart of Texas Vol. 1: Lonesome Cowboy/Texas Two-Step (2007)
- Heart of Texas Vol. 2: Caroline's Child / Dr. Texas (2007)
- Heart of Texas Vol. 3: Nell's Cowboy/ Lone Star Baby (2008)

=== Legendary Lovers series ===
1. Cindy and the Prince, Silhouette Books (1988)
2. Some Kind of Wonderful, Silhouette Books (1988)
3. Almost Paradise, Silhouette Books (1988)

The above books were also reissued in the following publications:

- Legendary Lovers, Silhouette Books (1995) — Reissue of Cindy and the Prince, Some Kind of Wonderful, and Almost Paradise

=== The Manning Sisters series ===
1. The Cowboy's Lady, Silhouette Special Edition (1990)
2. The Sheriff Takes A Wife, Silhouette Special Edition (1990)

=== Midnight Sons series ===
1. Brides For Brothers, Harlequin Romance (1995)
2. The Marriage Risk, Harlequin Romance (1995)
3. Daddy's Little Helper, Harlequin Romance (1995)
4. Because of the Baby, Harlequin Romance (1996)
5. Falling For Him, Harlequin Romance (1996)
6. Ending in Marriage, Harlequin Romance (1996)
7. Born in a Small Town, Harlequin SuperRomance(2000)

The above books were also reissued in the following publications:

- Family Men (2000) — Omnibus: Daddy's Little Helper / Because of the Baby
- The Last Two Bachelors (2000) — Omnibus: Falling for Him / Ending in Marriage
- Mail-Order Marriages (2000) — Omnibus: Brides for Brothers / Marriage Risk

=== Mrs. Miracle and Mr. Miracle series ===
- Mrs. Miracle (2009)
- Call Me Mrs. Miracle (2010)
- Mr. Miracle (2014)
- A Mrs. Miracle Christmas (2019)

=== Navy series ===
1. Navy Wife, Silhouette Books (1988)/2003
2. Navy Blues, Silhouette Books (1989)/2003
3. Navy Brat, Silhouette Books (1991)/2004
4. Navy Woman, Silhouette Books (1991)/2004
5. Navy Baby, HQN Books (1991)/2005
6. Navy Husband, Silhouette Special Edition (2005)

The above books were also reissued in the following publications:

- Navy Brides (2005) — Omnibus: Navy Wife / Navy Blues / Navy Brat
- Navy Grooms (2005) — Omnibus: Navy Woman / Navy Baby / Navy Husband
- Navy Wife / Navy Blues (omnibus) (2006)

=== New Beginnings series ===
1. Last One Home, Ballantine Books (2015)
2. A Girl's Guide to Moving On, Ballantine Books (2016)
3. If Not For You, Ballantine Books (2017)

=== New Christmas series ===
- Jingle All The Way, Ballantine Books (2020)
- Dear Santa, Ballantine Books (2021)

=== New Holiday series ===
- The Christmas Spirit, Ballantine Books (2022)

=== Orchard Valley Trilogy ===
1. Valerie, Harlequin (1992)
2. Stephanie, Harlequin (1992)
3. Norah, Harlequin (1993)
4. Lone Star Lovin', Harlequin (1993)

The above books were also reissued in the following publications:

- Orchard Valley, MIRA Books(1999) — Reissue of Valerie, Stephanie, and Norah

=== That Special Woman series Multi-Author ===
- Hasty Wedding (1993)
- Baby Blessed (1994)
- Same Time, Next Year (1995)

=== Those Manning Men series ===
1. Marriage of Inconvenience, Silhouette Special Edition (1992)
2. Stand-In Wife, Silhouette Special Edition (1992)
3. Bride on the Loose, Silhouette Special Edition (1992)
4. Same Time, Next Year, (1995)
5. Silver Bells, (2009)

=== Wyoming series ===
1. Denim and Diamonds, (1989)
2. The Wyoming Kid, (2006)

=== Stand-alone novels ===
- Starlight (1983)
- Girl Like Janet (1984)
- Undercover Dreamer (1984)
- Heartsong (1984)
- That Wintry Feeling (1984)
- Thanksgiving Prayer (1984)
- Gift of Christmas (1984)
- Borrowed Dreams: Alaska (1985)
- Love Thy Neighbor (1985)
- Adam's Image (1985)
- Promise Me Forever (1985)
- Laughter in the Rain (1985)
- The Trouble with Caasi (1985)
- A Friend or Two (1985)
- Christmas Masquerade (1985)
- Let It Snow (1986)
- The Matchmakers (1986)
- Reflections of Yesterday (1986)
- Shadow Chasing (1986)
- Yesterday's Hero (1986)
- White Lace and Promises (1986)
- Jury of His Peers (1986)
- Yesterday Once More (1986)
- Friends and Then Some (1986)
- All Things Considered (1987)
- Love by Degree (1987)
- Sugar and Spice (1987)
- Mail-Order Bride (1987)
- No Competition (1987)
- Love 'N' Marriage (1987)
- Husband Required (1987)
- Any Sunday (1988)
- The Playboy and the Widow (1988)
- Denim and Diamonds (1989)
- Yours and Mine (1989)
- Almost an Angel (1989)
- For All My Tomorrows (1989)
- The Way to a Man's Heart (1989)
- Country Bride (1990)
- Fallen Angel (1990)
- A Little Bit Country (1990)
- Rainy Day Kisses (1990)
- The Courtship of Carol Sommars (1990)
- First Comes Marriage (1991)
- My Funny Valentine (1991)
- Here Comes Trouble (1991)
- Stolen Kisses (1991)
- Father's Day (1991)
- The Forgetful Bride (1991)
- The Man You'll Marry (1992)
- My Hero (1992)
- Lone Star Lovin' (1993)
- Ready for Romance (1993)
- Morning Comes Softly, Harper (1993/2006)
- One Night, Harper (1994)
- Family Affair (1994)
- This Matter of Marriage, MIRA Books (1997/2003)
- Three Brides, No Groom, Silhouette Books (1997)
- Montana, Harlequin Books (1998)
- Can This Be Christmas?, MIRA Books (1998)
- Thursdays at Eight, MIRA Books (2001)
- Between Friends, MIRA Books (2002)
- The Christmas Basket, MIRA Books (2002)
- Changing Habits, MIRA Books (2003)
- The Snow Bride , MIRA Books (2003)
- When Christmas Comes, MIRA Books (2004)
- There's Something About Christmas, MIRA Books (2005)
- The Perfect Christmas, MIRA Books (2009)
- Starry Night, Ballantine Books (2013)
- Mr. Miracle, Ballantine Books (2014)
- Twelve Days of Christmas, Ballantine Books (2016)
- Any Dream Will Do, Ballantine Books (2017)
- Merry and Bright, Ballantine Books (2017)
- Cottage By the Sea, Ballantine Books (2018)
- Alaskan Holiday, Ballantine Books (October 2, (2018)
- Window on the Bay, Ballantine Books (2019)
- A Walk Along the Beach, Ballantine Books (2020)
- It's Better This Way, Ballantine Books (2021)
- The Best Is Yet to Come, Ballantine Books (2022)
- Must Love Flowers, Ballantine Books (2023)

=== Anthologies ===
- Christmas Treasures '86, Silhouette (1986)
- Christmas Treasures '91 Silhouette (1991)
- To Mother With Love, Silhouette (1993)
- Men in Uniform By Request, (1994)
- Three Mothers and a Cradle, Silhouette (1995)
- Christmas Angels: 3 Heavenly Romances (1996)
- Mothers & Daughters, Signet (1998)
- ’Tis the Season, "Christmas Masquerade" @ Silhouette(1999)
- Ready for Love, "Ready for Marriage", "Ready for Romance"♦ MIRA Books(2001)
- Take 5, "Yesterday Once More", "Adam's Image" ♦ Harlequin(2001)
- An Ideal Marriage?, "Father’s Day", "First Comes Marriage", "Here Comes Trouble" ♦ Harlequin(2001)
- Silhouette Christmas Collection, Midnight Clear, "Let It Snow" Silhouette(2001)
- Darling Daughters, "Yours and Mine", "Lone Star Lovin'" Harlequin Books(2002)
- Christmas Anthology, "A Gift To Last", "Can This Be Christmas?", "Shirley, Goodness & Mercy" ♦ MIRA Books(2002)
- On A Snowy Night, "The Snow Bride" & "The Christmas Basket" MIRA Books November (2004)
- Home for the Holidays–More Than Words–Volume 2, "What Amanda Wants" Harlequin Books October (2005)
- Home for the Holidays, "When Christmas Comes" & "The Forgetful Bride" MIRA Books November (2005)
- Someday Soon & Sooner or Later, Avon Books June (2006)
- Glad Tidings, "There’s Something About Christmas" & "Here Comes Trouble" MIRA Books November (2006)
- Ready for Love, "Ready for Romance" & "Ready for Marriage" MIRA Books December (2006)
- Be My Valentine, "My Funny Valentine", "My Hero" MIRA Books January (2007)
- Small Town Christmas, "Return to Promise" & "Mail-Order Bride" MIRA Books (2008)

=== Anthologies in collaboration ===
- My Valentine Harlequin, (1992) (with Katherine Arthur, Leigh Michaels and Peggy Nicholson)
- To Have and To Hold, Harlequin (1992) (with Barbara Bretton, Rita Clay Estrada, Sandra James)
- Christmas Treasures '92, Silhouette (1992) (with Maura Seger)
- Purrfect Love, Harper (1994) (with Linda Lael Miller and Patricia Simpson)
- Little Matchmakers, "The Matchmakers" Harlequin (1994)/1996 (with Barbara Bretton, Muriel Jensen)
- Always and Forever (1995) (with Bethany Campbell, Jasmine Cresswell)
- Three Mothers and a Cradle: Rock-a-bye Baby, Cradle Song, Beginnings (1996) (with Jill Marie Landis and Gina Wilkins)
- Runaway Brides, "Yesterday Once More" Silhouette (1996) (with Annette Broadrick and Paula Detmer Riggs)
- Home for Christmas, "The Forgetful Bride" Harlequin (1996) (with Anne McAllister and Shannon Waverly)
- Christmas Kisses, Silhouette (1996) (with Linda Howard and Linda Turner)
- The Father Factor (1998) (with Ann Major and Diana Palmer)
- That Summer Place, MIRA Books (1998) (with Jill Barnett and Susan Wiggs)
- Through the Years, "Baby Blessed" ♦ Silhouette(1999) (with Linda Howard and Fern Michaels)
- Power of Love (1999) (with Jayne Ann Krentz and Diana Palmer)
- A Spring Bouquet, "The Marrying Kind" ♦ Zebra (1996)/2000 (with Jo Beverley, Rebecca Brandewyne, Janet Dailey)
- Born in a Small Town, "Midnight Sons & Daughters" Harlequin(2000) (with Judith Bowen, Janice Kay Johnson)
- Holiday Blessings, "Thanksgiving Prayer" ♦ Steeple Hill(2000) Harlequin(2000) (with Irene Hannon and Jane Peart)
- Sealed With a Kiss, "My Funny Valentine" ♦ Harlequin(2002) (with Judith Bowen, Helen Brooks)
- Their New Year Babies (2004) (with Marie Ferrarella)
- Kiss Me Again (2005) (with Suzanne Forster, Lori Foster, Lisa Jackson)
- Hearts Divided, "5-B Poppy Place" MIRA Books February (2006) (with Lois Faye Dyer and Katherine Stone)
- Soldiers Brides (2007) (with Lois Faye Dyer and Lyn Stone)

== Nonfiction ==
- Knit Along with Debbie Macomber (2005)
- Knit Together (2007)
- Debbie Macomber's Cedar Cove Cookbook (2009)
- One Simple Act: Discovering the Power of Generosity (2009)
- God's Guest List: Welcoming Those Who Influence our Lives (2010)
- Debbie Macomber's Christmas Cookbook (2011)
- One Perfect Word (2012)
- Patterns of Grace: Devotions from the Heart (2012)
- Once Upon a Time: Discovering Our Forever After Story (2013)
- Debbie Macomber's Table: Sharing the Joy of Cooking with Family and Friends (April 3, (2018)

== Awards ==
- The Christmas Basket: (2003) RITA Award Best Novel winner
