= Brenda Joyce =

Brenda Joyce may refer to:

- Brenda Joyce (author) (born c. 1963), American writer
- Brenda Joyce (actress) (1917–2009), American film actress
