= Weird Tales (anthology series) =

Weird Tales #1, edited by Lin Carter, Zebra Books, 1980, cover art by Tom Barber.

Weird Tales was a series of paperback anthologies, a revival of the classic fantasy and horror magazine of the same title, published by Zebra Books from 1980 to 1983 under the editorship of Lin Carter. It was issued more or less annually, though the first two volumes were issued simultaneously and there was a year’s gap between the third and fourth. It was preceded and succeeded by versions of the title in standard magazine form.

== Summary ==
Each volume featured thirteen or fourteen novelettes, short stories and poems, including both new works by various fantasy authors and reprints from authors associated with the original Weird Tales, together with an editorial and introductory notes to the individual pieces by the editor. Authors whose works were featured included Robert Aickman, James Anderson, Robert H. Barlow, Robert Bloch, Hannes Bok, Ray Bradbury, Joseph Payne Brennan, Diane and John Brizzolara, Ramsey Campbell, Mary Elizabeth Counselman, August Derleth, Nictzin Dyalhis, Lloyd Arthur Eshbach, Robert E. Howard, Carl Jacobi, David H. Keller, Marc Laidlaw, Tanith Lee, Frank Belknap Long, Jr., H. P. Lovecraft, Robert A. W. Lowndes, Brian Lumley, Gary Myers, Ray Nelson, Frank Owen, Gerald W. Page, Seabury Quinn, Anthony M. Rud, Charles Sheffield, Clark Ashton Smith, Stuart H. Stock, Steve Rasnic Tem, Evangeline Walton, Donald Wandrei, and Manly Wade Wellman, as well as Carter himself.

Carter habitually padded out the volumes he edited with a few his own works, whether written singly or in collaboration (the latter generally "posthumous collaborations" with Clark Ashton Smith in which he wrote stories on the basis of unused titles or story ideas from Smith’s notebooks).

== The series ==
1. Weird Tales #1 (1980)
2. Weird Tales #2 (1980)
3. Weird Tales #3 (1981)
4. Weird Tales #4 (1983)
