= Bertrice Small =

American novelist

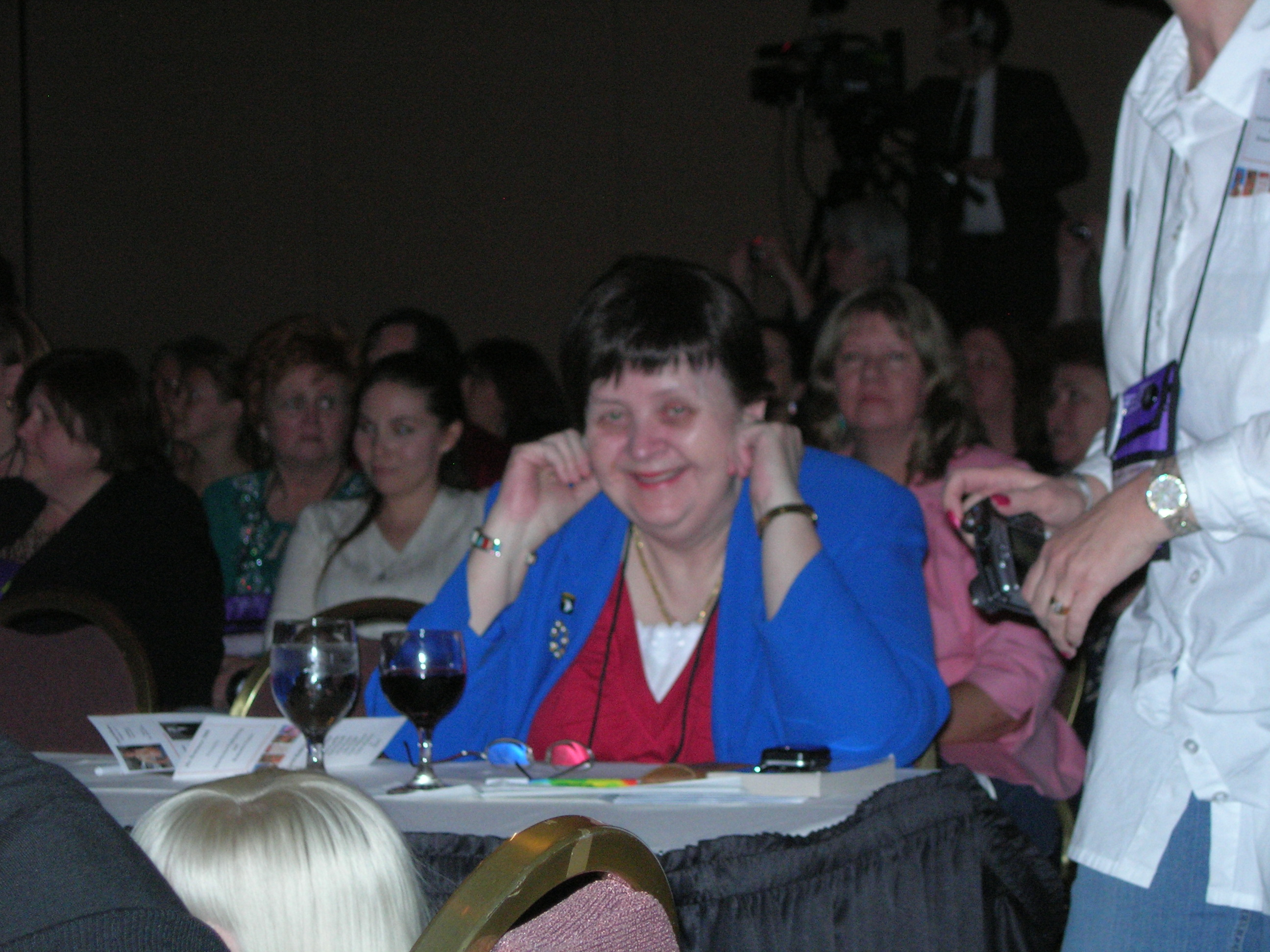
- Small at the 2008 Romantic Times Booklovers Convention in Pittsburgh
- Born: Bertrice Williams; December 9, 1937; Manhattan, New York, United States
- Died: February 24, 2015 (aged 77); Southold, New York, United States
- Occupation: Novelist
- Writing career
- Period: 1978–2015
- Genres: Romance, Historical, Erotica

Bertrice Small (December 9, 1937 – February 24, 2015) was an American author of historical and erotic romance novels. Bertrice lived on Long Island, New York, with her husband George Small. She was a member of The Authors Guild, Romance Writers of America, PAN, and PASIC.

== Personal life ==
Small was born Bertrice Williams in Manhattan on December 9, 1937. Her parents were David Williams and the former Doris Steen. Both worked in the business side of television broadcasting. She attended St. Mary's, a school for girls run by Anglican nuns, in Peekskill, N.Y. She later entered Western College for Women in Ohio but dropped out and transferred to a Katherine Gibbs secretarial school, after which she worked as a secretary in advertising agencies.

She was married for 49 years to George Small, who died in 2012. They had a son, Thomas, and 4 grandchildren. She had lived on eastern Long Island for 30 years. Small died on February 24, 2015, aged 77, in Southold, New York.

== Writing career ==
From 1978 on, Small authored over 50 novels, including in the historical romance, fantasy romance and erotic contemporary genres. Her novels include The Kadin, and the series The O'Malley Saga and Skye's Legacy.

A New York Times bestselling author, Small also appeared on other best-seller lists including Publishers Weekly, USA Today and the Los Angeles Times. She was the recipient of numerous awards including Best Historical Romance, Outstanding Historical Romance Series, Career Achievement for Historical Fantasy and several Reviewers Choice awards from Romantic Times. She had a "Silver Pen" from Affaire de Coeur, and an Honorable Mention from The West Coast Review of Books. In 2004 Bertrice Small was awarded a Lifetime Achievement Award by Romantic Times magazine for her contributions to the genre.

== Bibliography ==
=== Leslie Family Saga Series ===
1. The Kadin, 1978
2. Love Wild and Fair, 1978

=== Single Novels ===
- Adora, 1980
- Unconquered, 1981
- Beloved, 1983
- Enchantress Mine, 1987
- The Spitfire, 1990
- A Moment in Time, 1991
- To Love Again, 1993
- Love, Remember Me 1994
- The Love Slave, 1995
- Hellion, 1996
- Betrayed, 1998
- Deceived, 1998
- The Innocent, 1999
- A Memory of Love, 2000
- The Duchess, 2001
- The Dragon Lord's Daughters, 2004

=== The Border Chronicles ===
- A Dangerous Love, 2006
- The Border Lord's Bride, 2007
- The Captive Heart, 2008
- The Border Lord and Lady, 2009
- The Border Vixen, 2010
- Bond of Passion, 2011

=== O'Malley Family Saga Series ===
1. Skye O'Malley, 1981
2. All the Sweet Tomorrows, 1984
3. A Love for All Time, 1986
4. This Heart of Mine, 1988
5. Lost Love Found, 1989
6. Wild Jasmine, 1992

=== Wyndham Family Saga Series ===
1. Blaze Wyndham, 1988
2. Love, Remember Me, 1994

=== Skye's Legacy Series ===
1. Darling Jasmine, 1997
2. Bedazzled, 1999
3. Besieged, 2001
4. Intrigued, 2001
5. Just Beyond Tomorrow, 2002
6. Vixens, 2003

=== Friarsgate Inheritance Saga Series ===
1. Rosamund, 2002
2. Until you, 2003
3. Philippa, 2004
4. The Last Heiress, 2005

=== Pleasure Channel Series ===
1. Private Pleasures, 2004
2. Forbidden Pleasure, 2006
3. Sudden Pleasures, 2007
4. Dangerous Pleasures, 2008
5. Passionate Pleasures, 2010
6. Guilty Pleasures, 2011

=== World of Hetar Series ===
1. Lara, 2005
2. A Distant Tomorrow, 2006
3. The Twilight Lord, 2007
4. The Sorceress of Belmair, 2008
5. The Shadow Queen, 2009
6. Crown of Destiny, 2010

=== The Silk Merchants Daughters ===
1. Bianca, 2012
2. Francesca, 2013
3. Lucianna, 2013
4. Serena (as yet unpublished)

=== Anthologies in collaboration ===
- "Ecstasy" in CAPTIVATED, 1999 (with Thea Devine, Susan Johnson and Robin Schone)
- "Mastering Lady Lucinda" in FASCINATED, 2000 (with Thea Devine, Susan Johnson and Robin Schone)
- "The Awakening" in DELIGHTED, 2002 (with Nikki Donovan, Susan Johnson and Liz Madison)
- "Zuleika and the Barbarian" in I LOVE ROGUES, 2003 (with Jane Bonander and Thea Devine)

== Sources ==
- Official website
- Bertrice Small's author page on Historical Romance Writers
- Bertrice Small in Fantastic Fiction
- Interview with Bertrice Small on Veronika Asks
