= Weird Tales (disambiguation) =

Weird Tales is a pulp magazine.

Weird Tales may also refer to:

- Weird Tales (album), an album by Golden Smog
- Weird Tales (anthology series), a series of paperback anthologies, a revival of the classic magazine of the same title
- Weird Tales (film), a 1994 Italian film
- Captain America's Weird Tales, a short-lived comic book series

== See also ==
- Weird fiction, a literary genre
