= The Paradise Bargain =

1989 novel by Betina Krahn

- First edition (original title)
- Author: Betina Krahn
- Original title: Love's Brazen Fire
- Language: English
- Genre: Novel
- Publisher: Zebra Books
- Publication date: 1989
- Publication place: United States
- Media type: Print (Paperback)
- Pages: 416 pp
- ISBN: 0-8217-7540-5
- OCLC: 51808934

The Paradise Bargain is an historical, romance novel by the American writer Betina Krahn.

It is set in 1790s Western Pennsylvania near Pittsburgh against the backdrop of the Whiskey Rebellion. Whitney Daniels prefers buckskin to lace and moccasins to proper shoes, valuing her independence over being forced into marriage. Moreover, the new federal government has sent men to shut down her family's distillery in the fictional Rapture Valley, Pennsylvania. Major Garner Townsend, a member of the renowned Boston Townsend family, leads the effort to crush the rebellion, but Whitney, a frontier lass, captures his heart.

This novel was also re-released under the title Love's Brazen Fire.
