= Weird Tales 3 =

1981 anthology edited by Lin Carter

Weird Tales #3
- Cover art from the first edition
- Author: Lin Carter (editor)
- Cover artist: Tom Barber
- Language: English
- Series: Weird Tales
- Genre: Fantasy
- Publisher: Zebra Books
- Publication date: 1981
- Publication place: United States
- Media type: Print (paperback)
- Pages: 318
- ISBN: 0-89083-803-8
- Preceded by: Weird Tales #2
- Followed by: Weird Tales #4

Weird Tales #3 is an anthology edited by Lin Carter, the third in his paperback revival of the classic fantasy and horror magazine Weird Tales. It was first published in paperback by Zebra Books in 1981.

== Summary ==
The book collects fourteen novelettes, short stories and poems by various fantasy authors, including both new works by various fantasy authors and reprints from authors associated with the original Weird Tales, together with an editorial and introductory notes to the individual pieces by the editor.

== Contents ==
- "The Eyrie" (editorial) (Lin Carter)
- "The Chinese Woman" (Evangeline Walton)
- "The Messenger" (Steve Rasnic Tem)
- "To the Nightshade" (poem) (Clark Ashton Smith)
- "The Opposite House" (Diane Brizzolara and John Brizzolara)
- "The Guardian of the Idol" (Robert E. Howard and Gerald W. Page)
- "The Black Garden" (Carl Jacobi)
- "The House of the Temple" (Brian Lumley)
- "The Red Brain" (Donald Wandrei)
- "Annals of Arkya: 5. The Summons" (poem) (Robert A. W. Lowndes)
- "Annals of Arkya: 6. The Viola" (poem) (Robert A. W. Lowndes)
- "Nobody Ever Goes There" (Manly Wade Wellman)
- "The Summons of Nuguth-Yug" (Gary Myers and Marc Laidlaw)
- "The Wind That Tramps the World" (Frank Owen)
- "The Winfield Inheritance" (Lin Carter)
