= Weird Tales 4 =

1983 anthology edited by Lin Carter

Weird Tales #4
- Cover art from the first edition
- Author: Lin Carter (editor)
- Language: English
- Series: Weird Tales
- Genre: Fantasy
- Publisher: Zebra Books
- Publication date: 1983
- Publication place: United States
- Media type: Print (paperback)
- Pages: 288
- ISBN: 0-8217-1238-1
- Preceded by: Weird Tales #3

Weird Tales #4 is an anthology edited by Lin Carter, the fourth and last in his paperback revival of the classic fantasy and horror magazine Weird Tales. It was first published in paperback by Zebra Books in 1983.

== Summary ==
The book collects thirteen novelettes, short stories and poems by various fantasy authors, including both new works by various fantasy authors and reprints from authors associated with the original Weird Tales, together with an editorial and introductory notes to the individual pieces by the editor.

== Contents ==
- "The Eyrie" (editorial) (Lin Carter)
- "The Next Glade" (Robert Aickman)
- "Crocuses" (Charles Sheffield)
- "The Belfry" (James Anderson)
- "There Are No Ghosts in Catholic Spain" (poem by Ray Bradbury)
- "Homecoming" (Frank Belknap Long, Jr.)
- "Compliments of the Season" (John Brizzolara)
- "The City of Dread" (Lloyd Arthur Eshbach)
- "The Doom Chant of Than-Kul" (poem by Robert E. Howard)
- "Save the Children! " (Steve Rasnic Tem)
- "The Sea-Gods" (poem by Clark Ashton Smith)
- "Ooze" (Anthony M. Rud)
- "Late Night Final" (Stuart H. Stock)
- "The Vengeance of Yig" (Lin Carter)
