= Weird Tales 2 =

1980 anthology edited by Lin Carter

Weird Tales #2
- Cover art from the first edition
- Author: Lin Carter (editor)
- Cover artist: Tom Barber
- Language: English
- Series: Weird Tales
- Genre: Fantasy short stories
- Publisher: Zebra Books
- Publication date: 1975
- Publication place: United States
- Media type: Print (paperback)
- Pages: 265
- ISBN: 0-89083-715-5
- Preceded by: Weird Tales #1
- Followed by: Weird Tales #3

Weird Tales #2 is an anthology edited by Lin Carter, the second in his paperback revival of the American fantasy and horror magazine Weird Tales. It is also numbered vol. 48, no. 2 (Spring 1981) in continuation of the numbering of the original magazine. The anthology was first published in paperback by Zebra Books in December 1980, simultaneously with the first volume in the anthology series.

== Summary ==
The book collects fourteen novelettes, short stories and poems by various fantasy authors, including both new works by various fantasy authors and reprints from authors associated with the original Weird Tales, together with an editorial and introductory notes to the individual pieces by the editor. The pieces include a "posthumous collaboration" (the story by Smith and Carter).

== Contents ==
- "Introduction" (Lin Carter)
- "The Night Ocean" (H. P. Lovecraft and Robert H. Barlow)
- "Boy Blue" (Steve Rasnic Tem)
- "Fear" (Joseph Payne Brennan)
- "Valse Triste" (Ray Nelson)
- "The Song of the Gallows Tree" (poem) (Robert E. Howard)
- "The Feast in the Abbey" (Robert Bloch)
- "The Lamashtu Amulet" (Mary Elizabeth Counselman)
- "Something in the Moonlight" (Lin Carter)
- "Trick or Treat" (also known as "The Trick"; Ramsey Campbell)
- "Annals of Arkya: 3. Liberation" (poem) (Robert A. W. Lowndes)
- "Annals of Arkya: 4. The Guardian" (poem) (Robert A. W. Lowndes)
- "The Descent into the Abyss" (Clark Ashton Smith and Lin Carter)
- "The Sapphire Siren" (Nictzin Dyalhis)
- "The Sombrus Tower" (Tanith Lee)
