= Weird Tales 1 =

1980 anthology edited by Lin Carter

Weird Tales #1
- Cover art from the first edition
- Editor: Lin Carter
- Cover artist: Tom Barber
- Language: English
- Series: Weird Tales
- Genre: Fantasy
- Publisher: Zebra Books
- Publication date: 1980
- Publication place: United States
- Media type: Print (paperback)
- Pages: 268
- ISBN: 0-89083-714-7
- Followed by: Weird Tales #2

Weird Tales #1 is a fantasy anthology edited by Lin Carter, the first in his paperback revival of the classic fantasy and horror magazine Weird Tales. It is also numbered vol. 48, no. 1 (Spring 1981) in continuation of the numbering of the original magazine. The anthology was first published in paperback by American publisher Zebra Books in December 1980, and reprinted in 1983.

== Summary ==
The book collects fourteen novelettes, short stories and poems by various fantasy authors, including both new works by various fantasy authors and reprints from authors associated with the original Weird Tales, together with an editorial and introductory notes to the individual pieces by the editor. The pieces include a "posthumous collaboration" (the story by Smith and Carter).

== Contents ==
- "Editorial" (Lin Carter)
- "Scarlet Tears" (Robert E. Howard)
- "Down There" (Ramsey Campbell)
- "The Light From the Pole" (Clark Ashton Smith and Lin Carter)
- "Someone Named Guibourg" (Hannes Bok)
- "Annals of Arkya: 1. The Courier" (poem) (Robert A. W. Lowndes)
- "Annals of Arkya: 2. The Worshippers" (poem) (Robert A. W. Lowndes)
- "Bat's Belfry" (August Derleth)
- "The Pit" (Carl Jacobi)
- "When the Clock Strikes" (Tanith Lee)
- "Red Thunder" (poem) (Robert E. Howard)
- "Some Day I'll Kill You!" (Seabury Quinn)
- "Healer" (Mary Elizabeth Counselman)
- "The House Without Mirrors" (David H. Keller, M.D. )
- "Dreams in the House of Weir" (Lin Carter)
