= Howard Hughes bibliography =

A list of books and essays about Howard Hughes:

- Barlett, Donald L. (1 January 1981). Empire: The Life, Legend, and Madness of Howard Hughes. W. W. Norton, Incorporated. ISBN 978-0-393-00025-2.
- Marrett, George J. (2004). Howard Hughes: aviator. Naval Institute Press. ISBN 978-1-59114-510-3.
- Porter, Darwin (2005). Howard Hughes: Hell's Angel. Blood Moon Productions, Ltd. ISBN 978-0-9748118-1-9.
- Sheridan, John Harris (2011). Howard Hughes: The Las Vegas Years : the Women, the Mormons, the Mafia. AuthorHouse. ISBN 978-1-4634-0693-6.
- Thomas, Tony (1985). Howard Hughes in Hollywood. Citadel Press. ISBN 978-0-8065-0970-9.
