= Kyle Adams =

Kyle Adams may refer to:

- Kyle Adams (American football) (born 1998), American football tight end
- Kyle Adams (footballer) (born 1996), New Zealand association football defender

== See also ==
- Kylie Adams (born 1967), American fiction author
