= Legendary Lovers =

Legendary Lovers may refer to:

- "Legendary Lovers" (song), a 2013 song by Katy Perry from Prism
- Legendary Lovers, book series by Debbie Macomber
- Legendary Lovers, a 1983 album by Dogs (French band)

== See also ==
- Category:Legendary lovers
