= Jill Marie Landis =

American writer

- Born: November 8, 1948 (age 77); Clinton, Indiana, U.S.
- Education: California State University, Long Beach (BA)
- Occupation: Novelist
- Writing career
- Period: 1988–present
- Genre: Romance
- Notable works: Sunflower, Come Spring
- Notable awards: Golden Medallion – Historical Romance; 1989 Sunflower; RITA award – Best Romance of 1992; 1993 Come Spring
- Website: www.jillmarielandis.com

Jill Marie Landis (born November 8, 1948, in Clinton, Indiana, United States) is an American author of historical and contemporary romance novels. She is a two-time winner of the Romance Writers of America RITA Award.

== Biography ==
Jill Marie Landis was born on November 8, 1948, in Indiana, but moved to California when she was only ten years old. While studying for her B.A. in history from Long Beach State University, Landis held summer jobs working as a ride operator for Fantasyland at Disneyland.

Upon graduation, she spent ten years as a kindergarten teacher and then three years teaching English as a Second Language part-time. Although Landis wrote her first romance novel in junior high, she did not decide to pursue a writing career until 1983. Three years after she committed to writing a full-length novel, Landis sold a manuscript. From 1988 through 2003, she published sixteen historical romance novels. In July 2003, she made her debut in the contemporary romance genre. In 2008, her first inspirational historical romance, Homecoming, was published by Steeple Hill. It was followed in 2009 by The Accidental Lawman. Writing for Zondervan, Landis published Heart of Stone, the first book of the Irish Angels Series in 2010.

== Personal life ==
Landis is married and lives in Long Beach, California (as of 2016).

== Bibliography ==
=== Flowers Series ===
1. Sun Flower (1988)
2. Wild flower (1988)
3. Rose (1990)
4. Come Spring (1994)

=== Single novels ===
- Jade (1991)
- Past Promises (1993)
- Until Tomorrow (1994)
- Glass Beach (1998)
- The Orchid Hunter (2000)
- Summer Moon (2001)
- Magnolia Creek (2002)

=== Cassidy Family Saga Series ===
1. After All (1995)
2. Last Chance (1995)

=== Louisiana Series ===
1. Day Dreamer (1996)
2. Just Once (1997)
3. Blue Moon (1999)

=== Twilight Cove Series ===
1. Lover's Lane (2003)
2. Heat Wave (2004)
3. Heartbreak Hotel (2005)

=== Inspirational Romance ===
1. Homecoming (2008)
2. The Accidental Lawman (2009)
3. Heart of Stone (2010)

=== The Tiki Goddess Mysteries ===
1. Mai Tai One On (2011)
2. Two to Mango (2012)
3. Three to Get Lei'd (2013)
4. Too Hot Four Hula (2014)

=== Omnibus ===
- "Faithful and True" in Loving Hearts (1992)
- "Picture Perfect" in Sweet Hearts (1993) (with Kathleen Kane, Colleen Quinn and Jodi Thomas)
- "Cradle Song" in Three Mothers and a Cradle (1995) (with Debbie Macomber and Gina Ferris Wilkins)
- Heartbreak Ranch (1997) (with Dorsey Kelley, Chelley Kitzmiller and Fern Michaels)
- "Summer Fantasy" in Summer Love (1997) (with Stella Cameron, Anne Stuart and Janelle Taylor) & in Slow Heat (2001) (with Stella Cameron and Lisa Jackson)
- "On Silken Wings" in Strong Currents (2003)

=== Non-fiction ===
- "Everything Old Looks New Again" essay in North American Romance Writers (1999, ISBN 0810836041)

== Awards ==
- 1989 - Romance Writers of America Golden Medallion, Historical Romance – Sunflower
- 1993 - Romance Writers of America RITA Award, Best Romance of 1992 – Come Spring

She has won dozens of other awards such as Romance Readers, Romantic Times Magazine Awards, Bookrak Catalogue Bestselling awards and others.
