= Roberta Bender Grossman =

Roberta Grossman (born 1946) was an American publisher. She was born in Brooklyn, New York City, and died March 13, 1992, at the Memorial Sloan Kettering Cancer Center in Manhattan. She was founder and managing director of a number of book publishing companies, including Kensington Books and its imprint Zebra Books.
