= The Book of True Desires =

2006 novel by Betina Krahn

First edition (publ. Jove Books)

The Book of True Desires is a historical romance written by Betina Krahn. It won the RITA Award for Best Short Historical in 2007 and was nominated for a Romantic Times Award.

== Background ==
The Book of True Desires is a historical romance written by Betina Krahn and published in September 2006 by Jove. The novel is set in the late Victorian era.

== Plot summary ==
The heroine of the novel, Cordelia O'Keefe, wants adventure, and she convinces her grandfather to provide the funds for her to search for the Mayan "gift of the jaguar". Her grandfather insists that she be accompanied by his butler, Hartford Goodnight. Hartford is actually a chemist who has been working for her grandfather to pay off a debt.

During the pair's adventures in the Yucatán jungle, they fall in love.

== Reception ==
Kathe Robin of Romantic Times gave the novel 4.5 stars and wrote of the novel's "simmering sexual tension and witty, laugh-out-loud dialogue between [the] utterly engaging characters." In Booklist, John Charles described the novel as "simply superb", "with a generous dash of humor ... and plenty of action and adventure."

The novel won the RITA Award, given by the Romance Writers of America in 2007 in the category Best Short Historical. It was a Romantic Times Top Pick and was nominated for the Romantic Times Award for Historical Romance Adventure.
