= Rebecca Paisley =

American author of romance novels

Rebecca Boado-Rosas
- Born: Rebecca Boado; Unknown
- Occupation: Novelist
- Writing career
- Pen name: Rebecca Paisley
- Period: 1990–2016
- Genre: Romance

Rebecca Boado-Rosas is an American author of romance novels who wrote as Rebecca Paisley.

== Biography ==
Boado-Rosas began writing at a young age beginning with letters to her grandmother and poems to her sister.

She was inspired by her father, Emil Edward Boado. Major Boado was a pilot with the 469th Tactical Fighter Squadron of the United States Air Force, and died in Thailand during the Vietnam War.

Boado-Rosas published nine novels and four novellas from 1990 to 1997, and two further novels in 2015, under her pseudonym Rebecca Paisley.

On June 22, 2017, it was reported that the violent death of Boado-Rosas's adult daughter, a resident of Texas, was under investigation by the Austin Police Department.

== Awards ==
- Rebecca Paisley: 1995 Romantic Times Career Achievement Award winner.
- A Basket of Wishes: 1995 RT Reviewers' Choice—Historical Romance Fantasy
- A Basket of Wishes: 1995 RRA Best Love and Laughter
- Bed of Roses: 1996 RRA Best Multicultural Romance
- Bed of Roses: 1996 RT Award Nominee

== Bibliography ==
=== Single novels ===
- The Barefoot Bride (1990/Mar)
- Moonlight and Magic (1990/Oct)
- Diamonds and Dreams (1991/Oct)
- Rainbows and Rapture (1992/Jun)
- Midnight and Magnolias (1992/Dec)
- Heartstrings (1994/Aug)
- A Basket of Wishes (1995/Jul)
- Bed of Roses (1996/May)
- Yonder Lies Heaven (1997/Sep)
- Happily Forever After (2015)
- A Prince to Call My Own (2015)

=== Omnibus in collaboration ===
- Under the Mistletoe (1993) (with Shannon Drake, Judith E. French and Sara Orwig)
- Love Goddesses (1996) (with Carole Buck and Paula Detmer Riggs)
- A Christmas Miracle (1996) (with Virginia Henley, Katherine Kingsley and Stephanie Mittman)
- Harvest Hearts (2000) (with Joanne Cassity, Kristin Hannah and Sharon Harlow)

=== Collections in collaboration ===
- Love Potion (1995) (with Lydia Browne, Elaine Crawford and Aileen Humphrey)
- Romantic Times: Vegas (2016) (with Kimberly Cates, Ed DeAngelis, Richard Devin, Heather Graham, Tara Nina, Doris Parmett, Jennifer St Giles and Lance Taubold)
