= Kylie Adams =

American writer

Kylie Adams is an American fiction author of young adult fiction novels and contemporary romance, women's fiction, chick lit and holiday contemporary romance novels and short stories.

The Only Thing Better Than Chocolate and Santa Baby, Holiday Contemporary Romance short story collections which she contributed to were USA Today Bestsellers, and many of her works have been translated into several languages.

Adams lives in Oregon, United States.

== Bibliography ==
Source: Fiction Database

=== Stand-alone novels ===
- Fly Me to the Moon (2001)
- Baby, Baby (2002)
- Ex-Girlfriends (2005)
- Beautiful Liars (2008)

=== Holiday Romance anthologies ===
- The Only Thing Better Than Chocolate (with Janet Dailey and Sandra Sandra Steffen) (2001)
- The Night Before Christmas (with Lori Foster, Erin McCarthy, Jill Shalvis, Kathy Love, and Katherine Garbera) (2006)
- Santa Baby (with Lisa Plumley, Elaine Coffman and Lisa Jackson) (2011)

=== So Little Time series ===
- Dating Game (2003)

=== New York Minute series ===
- The Secret of Jane's Success (2004)

=== The Bridesmaid Chronicles ===
- The Bridesmaid Chronicles: First Kiss (2005)

=== Fast Girls, Hot Boys ===
- Cruel Summer (2006)
- Beautiful Disaster (2006)
- Bling Addiction (2006)
