= Kensington Publishing =

US book publishing company

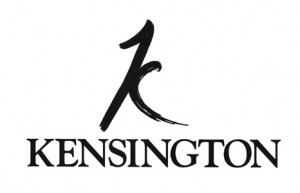
- Predecessor: Lancer Books
- Founded: 1974; 52 years ago
- Founder: Walter Zacharius; Roberta Bender Grossman
- Country of origin: United States
- Headquarters location: New York City
- Distribution: Penguin Random House Publisher Services
- Key people: Steven Zacharius; Adam Zacharius
- Publication types: Books
- Fiction genres: Romance, women's fiction, African American, young adult, nonfiction, true-crime, western, mystery
- Imprints: Zebra Books; Pinnacle Books; Dafina; Urban Soul; Citadel Press; Lyrical Press
- No. of employees: 85
- Official website: kensingtonbooks.com

Kensington Publishing Corp. is an American, New York–based publishing house founded in 1974 by Walter Zacharius and Roberta Bender Grossman. Kensington is known as "America's Independent Publisher". It remains a multi-generational family business, with Steven Zacharius succeeding his father as president and CEO, and Adam Zacharius as general manager.

It is the house of many New York Times bestselling authors, including Fern Michaels, Lisa Jackson, Joanne Fluke and William W. Johnstone. The company publishes around 500 new titles each year, and its backlist includes classics such as The Minority Report by Philip K. Dick, Johnny Got His Gun by Dalton Trumbo, I Hope They Serve Beer in Hell by Tucker Max and Being and Nothingness by Jean-Paul Sartre.

Kensington's imprints include Zebra Books, Pinnacle Books, Dafina, Citadel Press, and Lyrical Press, which provide readers with a range of popular genres such as romance, military thrillers and espionage, women's fiction, African American, young adult and nonfiction, as well as true-crime, western, and mystery titles.

== History ==
Kensington Books was founded by Walter Zacharius and Roberta Bender Grossman in 1974 as the successor to the paperback publisher Lancer Books, specializing in paperback romance novels. The Zebra Books and Pinnacle Books imprints debuted in 1975. Rather than bookstores, the company's books were generally sold in railroad stations, airports, bus terminals, and drug stores.

In 2008, Kensington acquired the publishing assets of Holloway House (publishers of Iceberg Slim and Donald Goines).

Co-founder Walter Zacharius died in 2011. In addition to having run Lancer Books from 1961 to 1973, Zacharius authored the World War II novel Songbird, published by Simon & Schuster in 2004 and republished by Kensington Books in 2007 as The Memories We Keep.

In 2022, Kensington acquired speculative fiction publisher Erewhon Books.

== Management ==
Steven Zacharius, son of founder Walter Zacharius, has been with the company since 1993 and has been president and CEO since 2005. He is also chairman of Kensington. The company's senior vice president, Michael Rosamilia, has been the CFO since 1989. Adam Zacharius, Steven's son, is the Vice President—General Manager and originally started working with Kensington seven years ago. Kensington is believed to be the only publishing company with three generations of family management.

The staff totals over 85 employees and, in addition to its internal sales team, Kensington has a distribution agreement with Penguin Random House Publisher Services' global sales force.

== Imprints ==
- Kensington Books – commercial fiction, romance
- Kensington Cozies – murder mysteries with minimal in-book violence, sex
- Citadel – general non-fiction
- Dafina – African-American literature
- Erewhon Books – speculative fiction
- John Scognamiglio Books – books curated by editor-in-chief John Scognamiglio
- Lyrical Press – digital-first
- Pinnacle Books – thrillers, true crime, westerns
- Rebel Base – digital-first sci-fi and fantasy
- Urban Soul – African-American literature
- Zebra Books – Science fiction, fantasy, romance

== Notable authors ==
- Shobhan Bantwal
- Noel Botham
- Janet Dailey
- Gerina Dunwich
- Joanne Fluke
- Hannah Howell
- Lisa Jackson
- William W. Johnstone
- Jeffe Kennedy
- Brandon Massey
- William J. Mann
- Fern Michaels
- Mary Monroe
- J.T. Patten (pen name of Scott Swanson)
- Robin Reardon
- Caitlin Rother
- Tamara Thorne
- Carl Weber
- Sarah Graves
- Bart Yates
