= Cassie Edwards =

American novelist (1936–2016)

- Born: April 5, 1936
- Died: January 4, 2016 (aged 79)
- Occupation: Novelist
- Writing career
- Period: 1982–2009
- Genre: Historical romance
- Website: www.cassieedwards.com

Cassie Edwards (April 5, 1936 – January 4, 2016) was an American author of over 100 historical romance novels published between 1982 and 2009. She was published by Dorchester Publishing, Signet Books, Kensington Publishing and Harlequin. Edwards stopped publishing after it was discovered she widely plagiarized works by other authors for her own novels.

== Biography ==
Edwards began writing romances in 1982 and released her 100th novel, Savage Skies, on August 28, 2007. Although her earlier books were classic historical romances, the vast majority of her novels involved Native American tribes. Edwards's grandmother was Cheyenne. Her first 99 books sold a combined 10 million copies as of August 2007, with her more recent novels averaging sales of 250,000–350,000 copies.

Edwards had won the Romantic Times Lifetime Achievement Award and the Romantic Times Reviewer's Choice Award, and was named one of Affaire de Coeur's top ten favorite romance writers. Edwards had a reputation for meticulously researching the proper anthropological backgrounds of each tribe she wrote about.

Edwards and her husband Charles, a retired high school biology teacher, were married for over sixty years. They had two sons. The family lived in St. Louis, Missouri for over thirty years, but later moved to Mattoon, Illinois.

Edwards died on January 4, 2016, at the age of 79.

== Plagiarism allegations ==
On 7 January 2008, the romance-novel review blog Smart Bitches, Trashy Books accused Edwards of widespread plagiarism after finding multiple passages in her novels that appeared to be directly taken from various works by other authors, including novels, poems, reference books, and websites about Native American history and culture. Many of the passages came from old references, many without copyright or with expired copyright protection. One of Edwards' publishers, Signet, initially defended the passages in question as fair use rather than copyright infringement.

Nora Roberts, herself a victim of plagiarism, joined the outcry. Two days later, Signet announced that they would be reviewing all of Edwards' books that they published to determine whether plagiarism had occurred, and, in April 2008, Signet stopped publishing Edwards' books "due to irreconcilable editorial differences." In an interview, Edwards said that she did not know she was supposed to credit sources, and her husband stated that Edwards gained ideas from her reference works but did not "lift passages".

== Partial bibliography ==
=== Chippewa ===
1. Savage Torment (1982)
2. Savage Obsession (1983)
3. Savage Innocence (1984)
4. Savage Heart (1985)
5. Savage Paradise (1987)

=== Savage Secrets ===
1. Savage Surrender (1987)
2. Savage Eden (1988)
3. Savage Bliss (1990)
4. Savage Dream (1990)
5. Savage Splendor (1991)
6. Savage Whispers (1991)
7. Savage Dance (1991)
8. Savage Persuasion (1991)
9. Savage Promise (1992)
10. Savage Mists (1992)
11. Savage Sunrise (1993)
12. Savage Pride (2000)

=== Wild Arizona ===
1. Wild Ecstasy (1992)
2. Wild Splendor (1993)
3. Wild Desire (1994)
4. Wild Abandon (1994)
5. Wild Rapture (1995)
6. Wild Embrace (1995)

=== Savage ===
1. Savage Illusion (1993)
2. Savage Spirit (1994)
3. Savage Embers (1994)
4. Savage Secrets (1995)
5. Savage Passions (1996)
6. Savage Shadows (1996)
7. Savage Longings (1997)
8. Savage Tears (1997)
9. Savage Heat (1998)
10. Savage Wonder (1998)
11. Savage Joy (1999)
12. Savage Fires (1999)
13. Savage Grace (2000)
14. Savage Devotion (2000)
15. Savage Thunder (2001)
16. Savage Honor (2001)
17. Savage Moon (2002)
18. Savage Love (2002)
19. Savage Destiny (2003)
20. Savage Hero (2003)
21. Savage Trust (2004)
22. Savage Hope (2004)
23. Savage Courage (2005)
24. Savage Vision (2005)
25. Savage Arrow (2006)
26. Savage Beloved (2006)
27. Savage Tempest (2006)
28. Savage Quest (2007)
29. Savage Intrigue (June 2007)
30. Savage Skies (September 2007)
31. Savage Glory (November 2007)
32. Savage Flames (February 2008)
33. Savage Abandon (September 2008)
34. Savage Sun (April 2009)
35. Savage Dawn (September 2009)

=== Wild Tribes ===
1. Wild Bliss (1995)
2. Wild Thunder (1995)
3. Wild Whispers (1996)
4. Wind Walker (2004)

=== Dreamcatcher ===
1. Running Fox (2006)
2. Shadow Bear (2007)
3. Falcon Moon (2007)

=== Stand-alone novels ===
1. Portrait of Desire (1982)
2. Rapture's Rendezvous (1982)
3. Secrets of My Heart (1982)
4. Silken Rapture (1983)
5. Passions Web (1984)
6. Elusive Ecstasy (1984)
7. Island Rapture (1985)
8. Desire's Blossom (1985)
9. Forbidden Embrace (1985)
10. Eugenia's Embrace (1986)
11. Passions Fire (1986)
12. Beloved Embrace (1987)
13. Enchanted Enemy (1988)
14. Hostage Heart (1988)
15. Passion in the Wind (1988)
16. A Gentle Passion (1989)
17. Eden's Promise (1989)
18. Roses After Rain (1990)
19. Passion's Embrace (1990)
20. When Passion Calls (1990)
21. Touch the Wild Wind (1991)
22. Rolling Thunder (1996)
23. Flaming Arrow (1997)
24. Innocent Obsession (1997)
25. White Fire (1997)
26. Bold Wolf (1998)
27. Lone Eagle (1998)
28. Thunder Heart (1999)
29. Silver Wing (1999)
30. Winter Raven (2000)
31. Sun Hawk (2000)
32. Midnight Falcon (2001)
33. Fire Cloud (2001)
34. Spirit Warrior (2002)
35. Storm Rider (2002)
36. Night Wolf (2003)
37. Racing Moon (2003)
38. Proud Eagle (2004)
39. Silver Feather (2005)
40. Swift Horse (2005)
41. Her Forbidden Pirate (January 2009)

=== Omnibus ===
- An Old-Fashioned Valentine (1993) (with Kathryn Kramer and Eugenia Riley)
- Love's Legacy (1996) (with Madeline Baker, Mary Balogh, Elaine Barbieri, Lori Copeland, Heather Graham, Catherine Hart, Virginia Henley, Penelope Neri, Diana Palmer and Janelle Taylor)
- Baby on the Doorstep (1997) (with Lori Copeland and Susan Kay Law)
- Wild Ecstasy / Wild Rapture / Wild Embrace (2003)
