= Betina Krahn =

American writer

- Born: U.S.
- Occupation: novelist
- Writing career
- Period: 1983–present
- Genre: Romance
- Notable work: The Book of True Desires
- Notable awards: RITA award – Short Historical Romance; 2007 The Book of True Desires
- Website: www.betinakrahn.com

Betina Krahn (born Huntington, West Virginia) is a RITA Award winning and New York Times best-selling author of historical romance novels.

== Biography ==
=== Early years ===
Krahn, born Betina Maynard, is the second daughter of Dors Maynard and Regina Triplett. Krahn learned to read at the age of four, and began making up her own stories when she was only six. In fifth grade she won a silver "Noble Order of Bookworms" pin for her achievements in reading, and the following year she began writing down her stories.

Krahn graduated from high school in Newark, Ohio and received a B.S. in Education (Biological Sciences) at Ohio State University. After college, Krahn taught science in Newark, and studied for a graduate degree at Ohio State in the summers. It was during those summers that she met her future husband, physics graduate student Donald Krahn.

The family moved to Oklahoma, where Krahn finished the work for her Masters of Education in Counseling in 1973. In 1974, she gave birth to her first child, Nathan, with the second son Zebulun arriving in 1978. With two young children, Krahn became a stay-at-home mother for a time, also finding time to volunteer on a community board working to get funding for mental health care in part of Western Oklahoma. Once the funding was secured, Krahn worked as an HR director for a mental health center.

=== Writing career ===
During her time in Oklahoma, Krahn was introduced to historical romances when a friend lent her copy of a Kathleen Woodiwiss book. Soon she had plots and characters appearing in her own head and began to write them down on a yellow legal pad. With her husband's encouragement, she sent her first finished manuscript to a publisher. In January 1983, this book was bought by Zebra. Krahn and her husband purchased a computer so that she could do her first set of revisions, and the book was published later that year.

The family moved to Minnesota, and Krahn began to write full-time. By 1995, her books were making the New York Times Besteller List and in 2007 she won her first RITA Award with The Book of True Desires. Her books have been translated into many languages including Russian and Italian.

=== Family ===
Krahn's husband, Donald, died of cancer in 1995. She saw her two sons through law school and graduate school, and then moved to Florida to live near her father and sister, Sharon. Krahn is currently engaged, to Rex, and has become a grandmother to two boys and a girl.

== Books ==
=== The Convent of the Brides of Virtue Trilogy ===
- The Husband Test (2001)
- The Wife Test (2003)
- The Marriage Test (2004)

=== High-Victorian Romantic Adventures ===
- The Book of the Seven Delights (2005)
- The Book of True Desires (2006)

=== Other Historical Novels ===
- Rapture's Ransom (1983)
- Passion's Storm (1985)
- Revel Passion (1987)
- Hidden Fires (1988)
- Love's Brazen Fire (1989), rereleased as The Paradise Bargain (2003)
- Passion's Ransom (1989)
- Passion's Treasure (1989), rereleased as Just Say Yes (2002)
- Midnight Magic (1990), rereleased as Luck Be a Lady (2002)
- Caught in the Act (1990)
- Behind Closed Doors (1991)
- My Warrior's Heart (1992), rereleased as The Enchantment (2005)
- The Princess and the Barbarian (1993)
- The Last Bachelor (1994)
- The Perfect Mistress (1995)
- The Unlikely Angel (1996)
- The Mermaid (1997)
- The Soft Touch (1998)
- Sweet Talking Man (2000)
- Not Quite Married (2004)

=== Contemporary ===
- Make Me Yours (2009)
- Manhunting (Valentine's Day 2010)

=== Anthologies ===
- Avon Books Presents: Christmas Romance (1990)
- Haunting Love Stories (1991) (with Shannon Drake, Linda Lael Miller and Christina Skye)
- A Victorian Christmas (1992)
- Stardust (1994)
