= Innocence Undone =

Book by Kat Martin

- Author: Kat Martin
- Language: English
- Series: Kingsland
- Genre: Romance
- Published: January 1997
- Publication place: United States
- Pages: 384

Innocence Undone is an American romance novel by Kat Martin. It was published in 1997 by St. Martin's Press, and is part of Martin's Kingsland series.

== Plot ==
The novel is set in Georgian-era England, and centers around Jessie Fox, the daughter of a prostitute, being taken in by the old Marquess of Belmore to be raised as a lady. The Marquess intends to have the Jessie marry his son Matthew, a Navy captain, so that they can both inherit the Belmore title after he passes. Matthew, knowing Jessie's reputation as a street child, believes that Jessie is manipulating his father into treating her like a lady, while Jessie fears that her true backstory will be discovered by the public and tarnish the Belmore name.

== Characters ==
=== Main ===
- Jessica "Jessie" Fox - the 19-year-old daughter of a prostitute who is brought up by the Marquess of Belmore
- Captain Matthew Seaton, Earl of Strickland - a Captain in the Royal Navy, Commander of His Majesty's gunship the Norwich, younger son of the Marquess of Belmore, and Jessie's love interest
- Reginald Seaton, Marquess of Belmore - the father of Matthew and Richard Seaton, and the surrogate father of Jessie Fox
