= Ruby Jean Jensen =

American author (1927–2010)

- Born: Ruby Jean Hendrickson; March 1, 1927; McDonald County, Missouri, United States
- Died: November 16, 2010 (aged 83); Fayetteville, Arkansas, United States
- Resting place: Pea Ridge, Arkansas
- Occupation: Writer
- Writing career
- Pen name: R.J. Jensen, R.J. Hendrickson
- Language: English
- Years active: 1974-1995
- Genres: horror, Gothic romance

Ruby Jean Jensen (March 1, 1927 – November 16, 2010) was an American author of pulp horror fiction. A "constant presence in Zebra's catalogue", she specialized in the "creepy child" or "child in supernatural peril" trope.

== Life and work ==
Jensen was born Ruby Jean Hendrickson in McDonald County, Missouri, where she spent her early years before moving with her family to Northern California. There she met her husband, Vaughn Jensen. They moved to the Rogers, Arkansas area in the late 1950s. They were married for over fifty years, until his death in 1999.

Jensen took up writing at an early age, and published over 200 short stories. Her first book sale was to Warner Paperback Library in 1974—The House That Samael Built, a Gothic romance. After another three novels with them, all with strong paranormal elements, she published three more with Manor Books in 1978, with a heavier emphasis on the occult. She would switch to unmitigated horror for the rest of her career, which included short stints with Leisure Books and Tor before finally settling with Zebra, starting with MaMa (1983).

Many of her horror books dealt with the "creepy children" trope (in the lines of Henry James' The Turn of the Screw or Stephen King's "Children of the Corn") or that of the "evil doll" (as in the Child's Play film series or in Annabelle—which coincidentally is the title of a novel by Jensen, though unrelated to the film). Ruby cultivated an enthusiastic following and her paperbacks have become sought-after collectibles.

== Bibliography ==
=== Novels ===
Published by Warner Paperback Library

- The House That Samael Built (1974)
- Seventh All Hallows' Eve (1974)
- House at River's Bend (1975)
- The Girl Who Didn't Die (1975)

Published by Manor Books

- Child of Satan's House (1978)
- Satan's Sister (1978)
- Dark Angel (1978)

Published by Leisure Books

- Hear the Children Cry (1982, as R.J. Hendrickson)

Published by TOR Books

- Such a Good Baby (1982)
- The Lake (1983, as R.J. Jensen)

Published by Zebra Books

- MaMa (1983)
- Home Sweet Home (1985)
- Best Friends (1985)
- Wait and See (1986)
- Annabelle (1987)
- Chain Letter (1987)
- Smoke (1988)
- House of Illusions (1988)
- Jump Rope (1988)
- Pendulum (1989)
- Death Stone (1989)
- Vampire Child (1990)
- Lost and Found (1990)
- Victoria (1990)
- Celia (1991)
- Baby Dolly (1991)
- The Reckoning (1992)
- The Living Evil (1993)
- The Haunting (1994)
- Night Thunder (1995)
- Cry of the Soul (2022)
