= Robin Schone =

American novelist

Robin Schone (born c. 1954) is an American author of erotic romance novels.

== Biography ==
Schone read her first romance novel, These Old Shades by Georgette Heyer, at age twelve, and began reading erotic novels when she was fifteen. Although she has always written stories for herself, Schone was determined to be a painter, and studied art, classics, and world religion at Rockford College in Rockford, Illinois. Schone claims to have begun writing after she was married because it was too messy to set up an easel and paint in a small apartment.

Her fourth attempt at writing a novel, Awaken, My Love, was the first of her books to sell. The novel begins with a masturbation scene, and the heroine's orgasm sends her traveling through time. After being rejected by 28 agents, the book sold to a publisher five days after the twenty-ninth agent submitted it.

Schone suffered greatly from fibroid tumors in her uterus, and underwent a myomectomy after she became a published author. In order to commemorate the organization, Hysterectomy Educational Resources and Services, which helped her research her medical issues, she spearheaded the creation of Captivated, the first erotic romance anthology.

She was involved in a legal dispute with Kensington Publishing that has since been resolved. Because of this dispute, Schone did not publish a book for several years. Her novels have been translated into Chinese, Czech, French, German, Polish, Russian, and Spanish.

Schone met her husband, Don, on their first day of the school year in college, and they married nine months later, in June 1975. They currently live in Illinois and do not have children.

Schone operates a website where readers can discuss her books. In addition to providing her with feedback and ideas, forum users discuss issues ranging from sexuality to tips and recipes.

== Bibliography ==
- Awaken, My Love (1995)
- The Lady's Tutor (1999)
- The Lover (2000)
- Gabriel's Woman (2001)
- Scandalous Lovers (2007)
- Cry for Passion (2009)

=== Anthologies ===
- Captivated (1999)
- Fascinated (2000)
- Private Places (2008)
