= Lori Copeland =

American author (born 1941)

- Born: June 12, 1941 (age 85)
- Occupation: Novelist
- Writing career
- Period: 1982–present
- Genres: Romance, Christian

Lori Copeland (born June 12, 1941) is an American author of over 95 novels. She initially wrote romance novels until she began writing Christian fiction.

== Career ==
Lori Copeland's first book was published in 1982. She wrote romance novels until 1995, when she began writing Christian fiction. She has co-authored Christian romance novels with Virginia Smith and Angela Elwell Hunt.

Recognition received by Copeland includes the Romantic Times Reviewer's Choice Award, The Holt Medallion, and Waldenbooks' Best Seller award.

Copeland is a member of the Missouri Writers Hall of Fame.

== Personal life ==
Copeland and her husband, Lance, have been married more than 40 years. They live in Springfield, Missouri. They have three grown sons. Copeland and her husband are active supporters of her son's missionary work in Mali, West Africa.

== Bibliography ==
=== Malone Family ===
- Darling Deceiver (1990)
- Built to Last (1992)
- A Taste of Temptation (1992)

=== Harlequin Love and Laughter ===
- Dates and Other Nuts (1996)
- Fudgeballs and Other Sweets (1998)

=== Brides of the West ===
- Faith (1998)
- Faith, June, Hope

(omnibus) (1998)

- June (1999)
- Hope (1999)
- Glory (2000)
- Glory, Ruth and Patience (omnibus) (2000)
- Ruth (2002)
- Patience (2004)

=== Morning Shade Mysteries ===
- A Case of Bad Taste (2003)
- A Case of Crooked Letters (2004)
- A Case of Nosy Neighbors (2004)

=== Island of Heavenly Daze ===
- The Island of Heavenly Daze (2001) (with Angela Elwell Hunt)
- Grace in Autumn (2001) (with Angela Elwell Hunt)
- A Warmth in Winter (2001) (with Angela Elwell Hunt)
- A Perfect Love (2002) (with Angela Elwell Hunt)
- Hearts at Home (2003) (with Angela Elwell Hunt)

=== Belles of Timber Creek ===
- Twice Loved (2008)
- Three Times Blessed (2009)
- One True Love (2010)

=== Men of the Saddle ===
- The Peacemaker (2005)
- The Drifter (2005)
- The Maverick (2005)
- The Plainsman (2006)

=== Seattle Brides ===
- A Bride for Noah (Oct 2013)
- Rainy Day Dreams (Apr 2014)

=== Sisters of Mercy Flats ===
- Promise Me Today (1992)
- Promise Me Tomorrow (1993)
- Promise Me Forever (1994)

=== Western Sky ===
- The Courtship of Cade Kolby (1997)
- Outlaw's Bride (2009)
- Walker's Wedding (2010)

=== The Dakota Diaries Series ===
1. Love Blooms in Winter (2011)
2. Under the Summer Sky (2012)

=== The Amish of Apple Grove Series ===
1. The Heart's Frontier (with Virginia Smith) (2011)
2. A Plain & Simple Heart (with Virginia Smith) (August 2012)
3. A Cowboy at Heart (with Virginia Smith) (March 2013)

=== Novels ===
- Playing for Keeps (1983)
- A Tempting Stranger (1983)
- Only the Best (1984)
- A Winning Combination (1984)
- All or Nothing (1984)
- Out of Control (1984)
- Rainbow's End (1984)
- Forever After (1985)
- Spitfire (1985)
- More Than She Bargained for (1985)
- A Love of Our Own (1986)
- Hot on His Trail (1986)
- Out of This World (1986)
- Tug of War (1986)
- When Lightning Strikes (1986)
- Passion's Folly (1987)
- The Trouble With Thorny (1988)
- Tale of Love (1988)
- Sweet Talkin' Stranger (1989)
- Dancy's Woman (1989)
- Tall Cotton (1990)
- Fool Me Once (1990)
- Avenging Angels (1990)
- Tiz the Season (1990)
- Sweet Hannah Rose (1991)
- Passion's Captive (1991)
- Melancholy Baby (1991)
- Squeeze Play (1991)
- Forever, Ashley (1992)
- Like Father, Like Son? (1993)
- Like Father, Like Daughter? (1993)
- Two of a Kind (1993)
- High Voltage (1994)
- Someone to Love (1995)
- All or Nothing: Rainbow's End (1995)
- Bridal Lace and Buckskin (1996)
- Angel Face and Amazing Grace (1996)
- The Bride of Johnny McAllister (1999)
- Marrying Walker McKay (2000)
- Child of Grace (2001)
- Christmas Vows (2001)
- Roses Will Bloom Again: ...and Emma's Heart Will Never Be the Same (2002)
- Stranded in Paradise: A Story of Letting Go (2002)
- Mother of Prevention (2005)
- Monday Morning Faith (2006)
- Yellow Rose Bride (2006)
- Simple Gifts (2007)
- When Love Comes My Way (2012)

=== Omnibus ===
- Playing for Keeps / A Tempting Stranger (1990)
- Up for Grabs / Hot on His Trail (1991)
- Out of Control / A Winning Combination (1991)
- Out of This World / Forever After (1991)
- Spitfire / Tug of War (1991)
- The Best of Lori Copeland (1991)
- Tale of Love / Power and Seduction (1992) (with Amii Lorin)
- Timeless Love (1993) (with Catherine Creel, Kay McMahon, Bobbi Smith)
- Three Complete Novels: Avenging Angel / Passion's Captive / Sweet Talkin' Stranger (1994)
- A Love of Our Own / Passions Folly (1995)
- When Lightning Strikes / Tale of Love (1995)
- Seasons of Love (1995) (with Elaine Barbieri, Karen Lockwood and Evelyn Rogers)
- Love's Legacy (1996) (with Madeline Baker, Mary Balogh, Elaine Barbieri, Cassie Edwards, Heather Graham, Catherine Hart, Virginia Henley, Penelope Neri, Diana Palmer and Janelle Taylor)
- Baby on the Doorstep (1997) (with Cassie Edwards and Susan Kay Law)
- With This Ring: A Quartet of Charming Stories About Four Very Special Weddings (1998) (with Ginny Aiken, Dianna Crawford and Catherine Palmer)
- Fruitcakes and Other Leftovers / Christmas, Texas Style (1999) (with Kimberly Raye)
- Women of Faith Fiction Collection (2005) (with Patricia Hickman and Angela Elwell Hunt)

== Sources ==
- Tyndale House Publishers. "Lori Copeland Biography". http://www.tyndale.com/authors/bio.asp?code=145. Retrieved 26-01-2007.
