= Fern Michaels =

American novelist (1933–2025)

- Born: Mary Ruth Koval; April 9, 1933; Hastings, Pennsylvania, U.S.
- Died: November 12, 2025 (aged 92); Summerville, South Carolina, U.S.
- Occupation: Novelist
- Writing career
- Period: 1975–2025
- Genre: Romance
- Website: www.fernmichaels.com

Mary Ruth Kuczkir (née Koval; April 9, 1933 – November 12, 2025), known by the pen name Fern Michaels, was an American writer of romance and thriller novels. Her books include Family Blessings, Pretty Woman, and Crown Jewel, as well as the Texas quartet and the Captive series. She wrote over 200 books and sold an estimated 150 million copies, with more than 150 New York Times and USA Today best sellers.

== Life and career ==
Mary Ruth Koval was born in Hastings, Pennsylvania, on April 9, 1933. She married Michael Kuczkir in 1952, moved to Edison, New Jersey, and had five children. When the youngest entered school in 1973, her husband told her to get a job. Since she was unsure of how to get a job, she decided to try writing a book. Her husband was not very supportive of her efforts, and consequently, they separated.

Kuczkir originally wrote with a co-author, Roberta Anderson, under the joint pseudonym, Fern Michaels. Their first novel, Pride & Passion, was published in 1975. By 1978, they had signed a three-year contract with Ballantine Books, and their third novel, Captive Passions, had over 500,000 copies in circulation. In 1989, Kuczkir became the sole author under the Fern Michaels pen name.

Michaels has been quoted as saying that she loves breathing life into her characters. She has said she loves writing books about women who prevail under difficult circumstances, which she feels reflect her struggle for success early in her career. For her efforts, she has been inducted into the New Jersey Literary Hall of Fame.

When she was a girl, Michaels's grandmother told her "when God is good to you, you have to give back". With this in mind, she founded the Fern Michaels Foundation, which grants four year scholarships for deserving students. In addition to that, she has also helped establish pre-school and day care programs with affordable rates for single mothers.

Michaels lived in Summerville, South Carolina, in a 300-year-old plantation house listed in the Historic Registry. She claimed to share the house with a ghost named Mary Margaret (which had also been documented by the previous owners). Mary Margaret was said to leave messages on her computer.

Michaels died on November 12, 2025, at the age of 92.

== Bibliography ==
=== Captives ===
- Captive Passions (1977)
- Captive Embraces (1979)
- Captive Splendours (1980)
- Captive Secrets (1991)

Note: Captive Innocence (1981) is not part of this series. It is a separate novel.

=== Texas ===
- Texas Rich (1985)
- Texas Heat (1986)
- Texas Fury (1989)
- Texas Trilogy (omnibus) (1991)
- Texas Sunrise (1993)

=== Sins ===
- Sins of Omission (1989)
- Sins of the Flesh (1990)

=== Vegas ===
- Vegas Rich (1996)
- Vegas Heat (1997)
- Vegas Sunrise (1998)
- Vegas Trilogy (omnibus) (2001)

=== Kentucky ===
- Kentucky Rich (2001)
- Kentucky Heat (2002)
- Kentucky Sunrise (2002)

=== Sisterhood ===
1. Weekend Warriors (2003)
2. Payback (2004)
3. Vendetta (2005)
4. The Jury (2005)
5. Sweet Revenge (2006)
6. Lethal Justice (2006)
7. Free Fall (2007)
8. Hide and Seek (2007)
9. Hokus Pokus (2007)
10. Fast Track (2008)
11. Collateral Damage (2008)
12. Final Justice (2008)
13. Under the Radar (2009)
14. Razor Sharp (2009)
15. Vanishing Act (2009)
16. Deadly Deals (2009)
17. Game Over (2010)
18. Cross Roads (2010)
19. Déjà Vu (2010)
20. Home Free (2011)
21. Gotcha (2013)
22. Blindsided (2013)
23. Kiss and Tell (2014)
24. Eyes Only (2014)
25. In Plain Sight (2015)
26. Point Blank (2015)
27. Crash and Burn (2016)
28. Need to Know (2017)
29. Safe and Sound (2018)
30. Cut and Run (August 27, 2019)
31. Truth and Justice (2020)
32. Bitter Pill (2020)
33. 19 Yellow Moon Road (2021)
34. Tick Tock (2022)
35. Rock Bottom (2023)
36. Backwater Justice (2024)
37. Code Blue (2025)

=== Cisco ===
- No Place Like Home (2002)
- Family Blessings (2004)

=== The Godmothers ===
- The Scoop (2009)
- Exclusive (2010)
- Late Edition (2011)
- Deadline (2012)
- Breaking News (2012)
- Classified (2013)
- Hideaway (2017) e-novella
- Getaway (2017) e-novella
- Spirited Away (2017) e-novella
- Far and Away (omnibus: contains-Hideaway, Getaway, and Spirited Away) (2019)

=== Men of the Sisterhood ===
- Double Down (2015) (also published as Upside Down + Countdown + Take Down)
- Fast and Loose (2016)
- High Stakes (2017)
- Truth or Dare (2018)
- Hot Shot (August 27, 2019)

=== Santa's Crew ===
- Santa Cruise (2021)
- Santa & Company (2023)
- Santa's Secret (2024)

=== Stand alone novels ===
- Pride and Passion (1975)
- Vixen in Velvet (1976)
- Valentina (1978)
- Whitefire (1978) (written as Iris Summers)
- Sea Gypsy (1980)
- The Delta Ladies (1980)
- Whisper My Name (1981)
- Golden Lasso (1981)
- Beyond Tomorrow (1981)
- Paint Me Rainbows (1981)
- Captive Innocence (1981)
- Night Star (1982)
- Tender Warrior (1982)
- Wild Honey (1982)
- Picture Perfect (1982)
- All She Can be (1983)
- Free Spirit (1983)
- Cinders to Satin (1984)
- To Taste the Wine (1987)
- For All Their Lives (1991)
- Seasons of Her Life (1994)
- To Have and to Hold (1994)
- Desperate Measures (1994)
- Serendipity (1994)
- Yesterday (1995)
- Wish List (1995)
- Dear Emily (1995)
- Whitefire (1997)
- Finders Keepers (1998)
- Sara's Song (1998)
- Annie's Rainbow (1999)
- Celebration (1999)
- Split Second (1999)
- The Guest List (2000)
- Picture Perfect (2000)
- Listen to Your Heart (2000)
- What You Wish for (2000)
- Charming Lily (2001)
- Plain Jane (2001)
- The Future Scrolls (2001)
- Late Bloomer (2002)
- About Face (2003)
- Trading Places (2003)
- Crown Jewel (2003)
- The Real Deal (2004)
- The Nosy Neighbor (2005)
- Pretty Woman (2005)
- Fool Me Once (2006)
- Hey, Good Looking (2006)
- The Marriage Game (2007)
- Up Close and Personal (2007)
- Mr. and Miss Anonymous (2009)
- I'll Be Home for Christmas (2010)
- Return To Sender (2010)
- Christmas at Timberwoods (2011) (reissue of Split Second.)
- Betrayal (2011)
- Southern Comfort (2011)
- Tuesday's Child (2012)
- Fancy Dancer (2012)
- Forget Me Not (2013)
- The Blossom Sisters (2013)
- A Family Affair (2014)
- Wishes for Christmas (2015)
- Perfect Match (2015)
- No Safe Secret (2016)
- Holly and Ivy (2017)
- Sweet Vengeance (2018)
- Deep Harbor (2019)
- Spirit of the Season (September 24, 2019)
- Fear Thy Neighbor (2022)

=== Omnibuses/collections ===
- Desperate Needs (1995) (with Emilie Richards and Sherryl Woods)
- A Joyous Season (1996) (with Olga Bicos, Jennifer Blake, and Hannah Howell)
- Heartbreak Ranch (1997) (with Dorsey Kelley, Chelley Kitzmiller, Jill Marie Landis)
- Homecoming (1997) (with Deborah Bedford, Janet Dailey, Dinah McCall)
- Heart of the Home (1997) (with Denise Domning, Brenda Joyce and Bronwyn Williams)
- Through the Years (1999) (with Linda Howard, Debbie Macomber)
- Five Golden Rings (2000) (with Jo Beverley, Brenda Joyce and Katherine Sutcliffe)
- Shattered Night: Split Second and Picture Perfect (2001)
- The Delta Ladies / Wild Honey (2002)
- Maybe This Time (2003) (with Emilie Richards and Sherryl Woods)
- Let It Snow (2003) (with Holly Chamberlin, Marcia Evanick, Virginia Henley)
- Jingle All the Way (2004) (with Theresa Alan, Jane Blackwood and Linda Lael Miller)
- Deck the Halls (2004) (with Marcia Evanick, Virginia Henley, Lisa Jackson, and Linda Lael Miller)
- Dream of Me: Whisper My Name / Paint Me Rainbows (2004)
- Weekend Warriors / Payback (2005)
- Sugar and Spice (2006) (with Beverly Barton, Joanne Fluke, Shirley Jump)
- Captive Passions / Captive Embraces (2006)
- Captive Splendors / Captive Secrets (2006)
- Texas Fury / Texas Sunrise (2006)
- Texas Rich / Texas Heat (2006)
- Comfort and Joy (2007) (with Marie Bostwick, Cathy Lamb, and Deborah J. Wolf)
- Promises: Nightstar/Beyond Tomorrow (2008)
- Silver Bells (2008) (with Mary Burton, Judy Duarte, and JoAnn Ross
- Snow Angels (2009) (with Marie Bostwick, Janna McMahan, and Rosalind Noonan)
- Wildflowers: Sea Gypsy/Golden Lasso (2010)
- Holiday Magic (2010) (with Mary Carter, Terri Dulong, and Cathy Lamb)
- Making Spirits Bright (2011) (with Elizabeth Bass, Rosalind Noonan, Nan Rossiter)
- Coming Home for Christmas: Silver Bells/Snow Angels/Holiday Magic (2012)
- A Winter Wonderland (2012) (with Holly Chamberlin, Kristina McMorris, and Leslie Meier)
- Balancing Act: All She Can Be/Free Spirit (2013)
- Secret Santa (2013) (with Marie Bostwick, Laura Levine, and Cindy Myers)
- When the Snow Falls (2014) (with Nancy Bush, Rosanna Chiofalo, and Lin Stepp)
- The Most Wonderful Time (2016) (with Stacy Finz, Shirlee McCoy, and Sarah Title)
- Winter Wishes (2017) (with Jules Bennett, Leah Marie Brown, and Susan Fox)
- Mistletoe Magic: Making Spirits Bright/Mister Christmas/A Winter Wonderland/Candy Canes and Cupid (2017)
- Fate & Fortune: Vixen in Velvet/Whitefire (2018)
- A Season to Celebrate (2018) (with Donna Kauffman, Priscilla Oliveras, and Kate Pearce)
- A Snowy Little Christmas (October 29, 2019) (with Kate Clayborn and Tara Sheets)
