= Roberta Helmer =

American novelist (1950–2018)

- Born: July 19, 1950; Dayton, Ohio, U.S.
- Died: May 21, 2018 (aged 67)
- Education: University of Pennsylvania; Ohio State University
- Occupation: Novelist
- Writing career
- Pen name: Christina Skye
- Period: 1990–present
- Genre: Romance
- Website: www.christinaskye.com

Roberta Helmer (July 19, 1950 – May 21, 2018), under her pseudonym Christina Skye, was the best-selling American author of more than thirty-two novels in a variety of genres: romantic suspense, paranormal romance, as well as contemporary and historical romances. Many of her books have appeared on the USA Today and New York Times bestseller lists and the Publishers Weekly bestseller list. Her books have been translated into ten languages. Under her own name Helmer has written five non-fiction books about the classical Chinese puppet theater and traditional Chinese folk arts.

== Biography ==
Roberta Helmer was born in Dayton, Ohio, a descendant of American Revolutionary War hero Adam Helmer. She attended the University of Pennsylvania and Ohio State University, where she learned to speak fluent Chinese, French, and Japanese.

After receiving a doctorate in classical Chinese literature from Ohio State, Helmer became a translator, and was once nearly arrested when her European employer asked her to escort two ladies of dubious virtue into China's State Guest House. She later worked as a consultant to the National Geographic Society and the American Museum of Natural History.

Helmer's first writing attempts focuses on Chinese art and culture. After numerous interviews with puppeteers, sculptors, painters, and other artists who explained some of their centuries-old skills, Helmer wrote four non-fiction books. Her first historical romance, a Regency, was rejected by the first editor who received it because it did not strictly adhere to the current Regency convention. The following week, two other editors asked to represent her, and that first novel sold in 1990 in only six days. She has since authored five additional historical romances, nine contemporary romantic suspense novels, and seven paranormal romances.

Helmer's novels, which are always laced with humor and passion, feature smart, stubborn women and tough men who embark on adventures. Many of her historical romances tell stories about outsiders who must struggle to fit in. Her novels are popular worldwide, and have been translated into eight languages.

Two of her novels in the Code Name series, Code Name: Baby and Code Name: Princess, were selected as Cosmopolitan Magazine Book Club Selections and Code Name: Baby was named the Borders Best Romance of 2005. She has been nominated multiple times for the Romance Writers of America RITA Award, and is a two-time finalist for the National Reader's Choice Award. Romantic Times Magazine gave her a Career Achievement Award, and she has been nominated for numerous other Romantic Times Awards for various novels. In 2005 Helmer was inducted into the Affaire de Coeur Hall of Fame for her "pioneering efforts..and ability to remain a steadfast influence in women's fiction."

She lived in on the western slopes of McDowell Mountains in Arizona.

== Bibliography ==
=== Non-fiction ===
- The Poems of the Han-shan collection (1977)
- China's Crafts : The Story of How They're Made and What They Mean (1980)
- China's Puppets (1984)
- Shopping in China : arts, crafts, and the unusual (1986)

=== As Christina Skye ===
==== Regency Era ====
1. Defiant Captive (1990)
2. The Black Rose (1991)
3. East of Forever (1993)

==== DeLamere ====
1. Come the Night (1994)
2. Come the Dawn (1995)

==== Draycott Abbey ====
1. Hour of the Rose (1994)
2. Bride of the Mist (2004)
3. Bridge of Dreams (1995)
4. Key to Forever (1997)
5. Season of Wishes (1997)
6. Enchantment (1998)
7. Christmas Knight (1998)
8. The Perfect Gift (1999)
- Bridge of Dreams / Enchantment (2007)

==== Navy SEALs ====
1. Going Overboard (2001)
2. My Spy (2002)
3. Hot Pursuit (2003)

==== Code Name ====
1. Nanny (2004)
2. Princess (2004)
3. Baby (2005)
4. Blondie (2006)
5. Bikini (2007)

==== Single novels ====
- The Ruby (1992)
- 2000 Kisses (1999)

==== Anthologies in collaboration ====
- Haunting Love Stories (1991) (with Shannon Drake, Betina Krahn, Linda Lael Miller)

== See also ==
List of romantic novelists
