= Janna McMahan =

American author (born 1963)

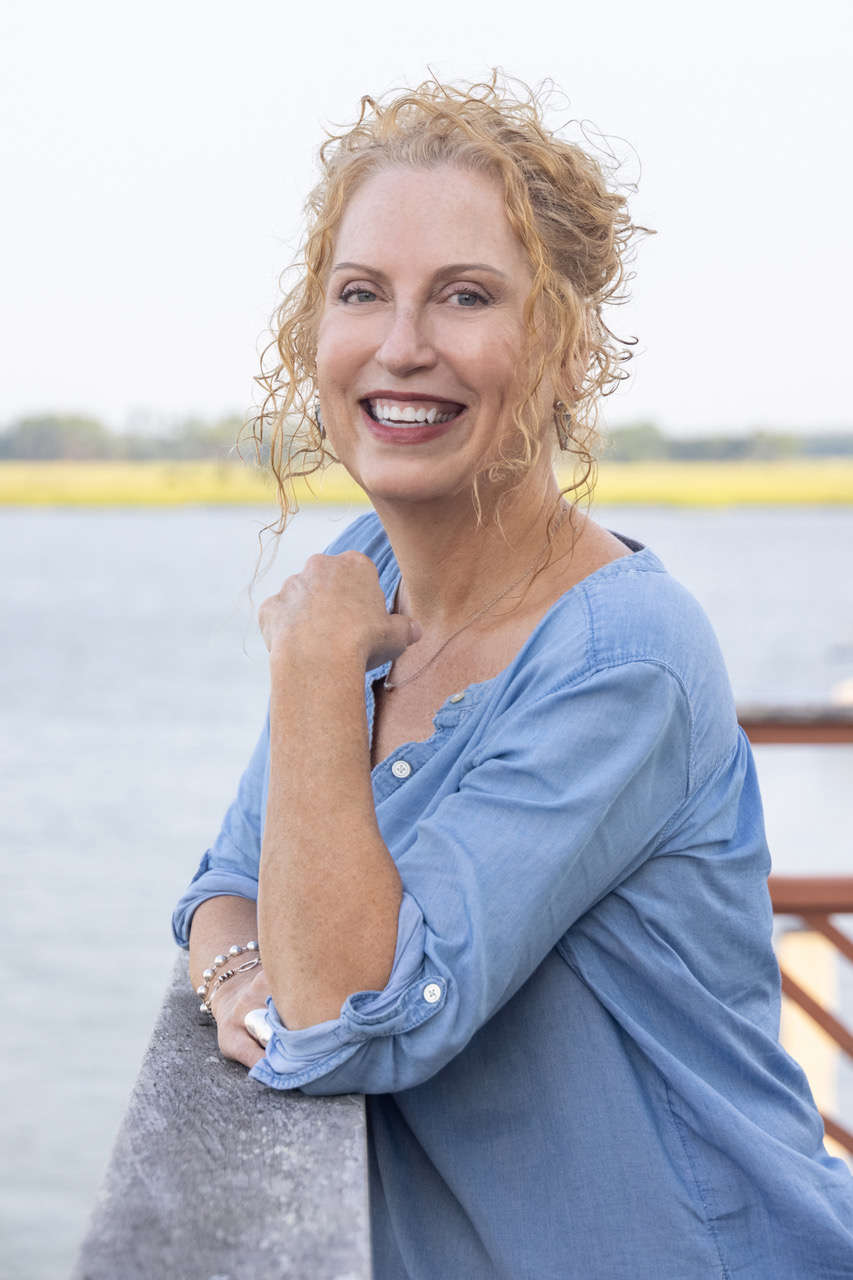
- McMahan in 2021
- Born: Janna McMahan; United States
- Occupations: Novelist; literary journalist; essayist
- Writing career
- Period: 2002–present
- Genre: Southern literature
- Subject: art
- Website: www.jannamcmahan.com

Janna McMahan is an American author who wrote her first novel when she was in her early thirties. She has published four novels, a novella, and several short stories.

== Awards and recognition ==
In 1998, McMahan won the South Carolina Fiction Project a literary competition sponsored by the Post and Courier and the South Carolina Arts Commission, for her short story "The Snag". Her short story "Seed Money" won the 2002 Piccolo Spoleto Fiction Open and "Pluff Mud" won the 2004 Colossal Short Story Contest, sponsored by the Columbia (South Carolina) Free Times. Surface Tension, an unpublished short story collection, was a finalist for the 2010 Flannery O'Connor Award for Short Fiction and won honorable mention in the 2011 competition for the Mary McCarthy Prize in Short Fiction. Surface Tension was also the winner of the Imaginative Writing Award (Betty Gabehart Fiction Prize) from the Kentucky Women Writers Conference in March 2005. McMahan was awarded the distinction of Literary Artist of the Year (2013) by Jasper Magazine, an arts publication in South Carolina.

McMahan's novella Decorations was included in the collection Snow Angels which was a Book of the Month Club selection and appeared in the New York Times, USA Today. and Publishers Weekly bestseller lists. Her novel Calling Home was selected as "Need to Read" by Target Corporation, and The Ocean Inside was nominated for book of the year by the Southern Independent Booksellers Association. Sojourner Magazine reviewer, Bobbi Buchanan, praised McMahan's new novel Anonymity: "Intriguing and believable characters are part of what makes Janna McMahan's novel Anonymity a memorable read". The novel was nominated for the Kentucky Literary Award sponsored by Western Kentucky University and the Southern Kentucky Book Festival. Kentucky novelist, Silas House, wrote of McMahan's work, "Janna McMahan is a natural voice who gracefully walks that tightrope of being both literary and commercial."

== Personal life ==
McMahan currently lives in Raleigh, North Carolina with her husband Dr. Robert Sherrier.

== Selected works ==
=== Novels ===
- Anonymity 2012, Kohler Books
- The Ocean Inside 2009, Kensington Books
- Calling Home 2008, Kensington Books
- Undertow 2001, Writers Bloc Press

=== Novellas ===
- "Snow Angels" 2009, Kensington Books

=== Short stories ===
- "Detritus" 2021, Chautauqua Literary Journal, Water Issue 18, UNC Wilmington
- "Scab" 2016, Still: The Journal
- "The Curator" 2014, Found Anew, anthology, University of South Carolina Press
- "Candy Cigarettes" 2008, Literary Journal, University of South Carolina Department of English
- "What's Left Standing" 2006, Wind Literary Journal
- "Intruder" 2006, StorySouth Online Literary Journal
- "Rolling Boil" 2006, Alimentum, the Literature of Food, anthology
- "Seeing Things" 2005, The Natahala Literary Journal
- "Pluff Mud" 2004, winner of the Colossal Short Story Contest, Free Times Magazine
- "Dry Land Fish" 2002, Limestone Literary Journal, University of Kentucky
- "See Money" 2002, Winner of the Piccolo Spoleto Fiction Open
- "Up the Creek" 2000, The Midday Moon Literary Journal
- "The Snag" 1998, Winner of the South Carolina Fiction Project, Charleston Post & Courier

=== Creative non-fiction ===
- "End Note: Southern Swing" July/August 2019, Walter Magazine
- "Make Your Encore Wedding Personal" 2019, Southern Bride & Groom
- "Painted Lady" 2017, O. Henry Magazine
- "Writer in Residence" 2016, Charleston Magazine
- "The Long Lake View" 2015, State of the Heart, anthology, University of South Carolina Press
- "Pat Conroy: Or How I stalked My Prince of Tides" 2013, The Limelight, literary anthology, Muddy Ford Press
- "A Name You Can Yell" 2012, Literary Dogs, anthology, Hub City Press
- "Batteries Not Included" 2010, The New Southerner Literary Journal
- "The Worst Bad Neighbor" 2009, We All Live Downstream, anthology, Motes Books
- "Book Tour Boot Camp" 2008, Travelingmom.com
- "A Strong Sense of Place," 2008, AGoodBlogIsHardToFind.com
- "Happy Camper" 2007, MusingMom.com
- "Sugar Babies" 2003, Cure Magazine
- "Confessions of a Bag Lady" 2002, Skirt! Magazine
