= Sarah Graves =

American novelist

Mary Squibb
- Born: Mary Talbot
- Occupation: Crime novelist
- Writing career
- Pen name: Sarah Graves
- Genres: Crime fiction, mystery fiction
- Subjects: Crime, thriller, mystery

Sarah Graves is the pen name of American mystery and crime novelist Mary Squibb. Based in New York, her Home Repair is Homicide series follows transplanted New Yorker Jacobia "Jake" Tiptree and her friend Ellie White as they solve murders in Eastport, Maine, all while she repairs her centuries-old house.

This series and the author's real-life experience have been featured in The New York Times Home & Garden, USA Today, and the Milwaukee Journal Sentinel.

In 2012, Random House reported that Graves has "more than 1 million copies in print" and her "first ten titles in mass market combined move nearly 3,000 copies per month".

In 2015, Graves's second series had its first book published, following ex-Boston homicide detective Lizzie Snow transplanted to Bearkill, Maine.

== Bibliography ==
Graves has produced two series of books, and begun a third series.

=== Home Repair is Homicide (Jacobia "Jake" Tiptree) ===
- #1 The Dead Cat Bounce (1997)
- #2 Triple Witch (1999)
- #3 Wicked Fix (2000)
- #4 Repair to Her Grave (2001)
- #5 Wreck the Halls (2001)
- #6 Unhinged (2003)
- #7 Mallets Aforethought (2004)
- #8 Tool and Die (2004)
- #9 Nail Biter (2005)
- #10 Trap Door (2006)
- #11 The Book of Old Houses (2007)
- #12 A Face at the Window (2008)
- #13 Crawlspace (2009)
- #14 Knockdown (2011)
- #15 Dead Level (2012)
- #16 A Bat in the Belfry (2013)

=== Lizzie Snow ===
- #1 Winter at the Door (2015)
- #2 The Girls She Left Behind (2016)

=== Death By Chocolate (Jacobia "Jake" Tiptree) (a spin-off of Home Repair is Homicide) ===
- #1 Death by Cherry Chocolate Cheesecake (2018)
- #2 Death by Chocolate Malted Milkshake (2019)
- #3 Death by Chocolate Frosted Doughnut (2020)
- #4 Death by Chocolate Snickerdoodle (2021)
- #5 Death by Chocolate Chip Cupcake (2022)
- #6 Death by Chocolate Marshmallow Pie (2023)
- #7 Death by Chocolate Raspberry Scone (2024)
- #8 Death by Chocolate Pumpkin Muffin (2025)
