= James Arthur Anderson =

American author

James Arthur Anderson's first published short story appeared in Andrew J. Offutt's Swords Against Darkness V anthology in 1979. He has since published stories in Lin Carter's Weird Tales 4, Elditch Tales, Fantasy Tales, and Haunts. His nonfiction has appeared in Fangoria. In 1997 he began using his complete name, James Arthur Anderson, in his by-line. He has won several poetry awards, including first place in the rhymed poetry category in the 79th annual Writer's Digest Writing Competition.

Anderson was born in Providence, Rhode Island, in 1955 and currently lives in Garfield, Georgia. He received a B.A. from Rhode Island College in 1977, and an M.A. in 1987. He earned his Ph.D. in literature from the University of Rhode Island in 1992. In 2023 he was named professor emeritus at Johnson & Wales University, where he had taught since 1984 until his retirement. His book-length study of H.P. Lovecraft, Out of the Shadows: A Structuralist Approach to Understanding the Fiction of H.P. Lovecraft was published in 2011 by Wildside Press. In June, 2017, he published a book-length critical study of Stephen King, The Linguistics of Stephen King: Layered Language and Meaning in the fiction with McFarland Press. In 2020 he published "Excavating Stephen King: a Darwinist Hermeneutic Study of the Fiction" with Rowman & Littlefield.
