= Shannon Waverly =

American novelist

- Born: Fall River, Massachusetts United States
- Occupation: Novelist
- Writing career
- Period: 1990–2000
- Genre: romance

Shannon Waverly is an American author of contemporary romance novels.

== Biography ==
Waverly was born in Fall River, Massachusetts. Even as a child she enjoyed writing, and attempted to write her first novel when she was only 12. Unable to finish her novel, Waverly turned to short stories, submitting several to Seventeen, all of which were quickly rejected.

She earned a B.A. in English from Stonehill College, where she served as the editor of the school's literary magazine during her senior year. Shortly after her graduation she married her college sweetheart, and then embarked on a brief career as a school teacher. Waverly was a stay-at-home-mother while her son and daughter were young. When her children were teenagers she worked as a temporary secretary, giving her the opportunity to research different fields and careers.

After plotting four romance novels, Waverly finally sold her fifth manuscript to Harlequin books. The novel was published in 1990 as part of the Harlequin Romance category line. Some of her subsequent novels have been published within the Harlequin Superromance line instead. Romantic Times has praised her for "wonderfully real characters."

== Novels ==
- A Summer Kind of Love (1990)
- No Trespassing (1991)
- New Lease on Love (1992)
- Temporary Arrangement (1993)
- Christmas Angel (1993)
- Expectations (1994)
- The Baby Battle (1994)
- Three for the Road (1995)
- The Best Man (1995)
- Under One Roof (1996)
- Found, One Father (1997)
- Julia (1998)
- Vacancy, Wife (1999)
- Lauren (1999)
- Cathryn (2000)

=== Omnibus ===
- Home For Christmas (1996) (with Anne McAllister, Debbie Macomber)
