= Susan Johnson (American novelist) =

American novelist (born 1939)

- Born: December 4, 1939 (age 86)
- Occupation: Author
- Writing career
- Pen name: CC Gibbs
- Genre: Romance
- Website: www.susanjohnsonauthor.com

Susan Johnson (born December 4, 1939) is an American author of numerous New York Times bestselling sexually explicit romance novels. She is unusual among romance writers for providing footnotes in some of her novels.

== Bibliography ==
=== Stand Alone Titles ===
- Pure Sin (1994)
- Temporary Mistress (2000)
- Seduction in Mind (2001)
- Tempting (2002)
- Again and Again (2003)
- Pure Silk (2004)

=== Carre Series ===
- Outlaw (1993)
- To Please a Lady (1999)

=== Darley Series ===
- When You Love Someone (2006)
- When Someone Loves You (2006)
- At Her Service (2008)

=== St.John/Duras ===
- Sinful (1993)
- Taboo (1996)
- Wicked (1997)
- A Touch of Sin (1999)
- Legendary Lover (2000)

=== Braddock Black ===
- Blaze (1992)
- Forbidden (1991)
- Silver Flame (1993)
- Brazen (1995)
- Force of Nature (2003)

=== Russian series ===
- Seized by Love (1994)
- Love Storm (1995)
- Sweet Love Survive (1996)
- Golden Paradise (2001)

=== Bruton Street Bookstore Series ===
- Gorgeous As Sin (2009)
- Sexy As Hell (2010)
- Sweet as the Devil (2011)
- Seductive as Flame (December 2011)

=== Hot Contemporaries ===
- Blonde Heat (2002)
- Hot Legs (2005)
- Hot Pink (2003)
- Hot Spot (2005)
- Hot Streak (2004)
- French Kiss (2006)
- Wine, Tarts and Sex (2007)
- Hot Property (2008)

=== Anthologies ===
- Rough Around the Edges (1998)
- Captivated(1999)
- Naughty, Naughty (1999)
- Delighted (2002)
- Taken by Surprise(2003)
- Fascinated (2000)
- Strangers in the Night (2004)
- Not Just for Tonight (2005)
- Twin Peaks (2005)
- Perfect Kisses (2007)
- Undone (2010)

=== Non-fiction ===
- "The Joy of Writing" essay in North American Romance Writers (1999, ISBN 0810836041)
