= Lisa Jackson (author) =

American novelist (born 1952)

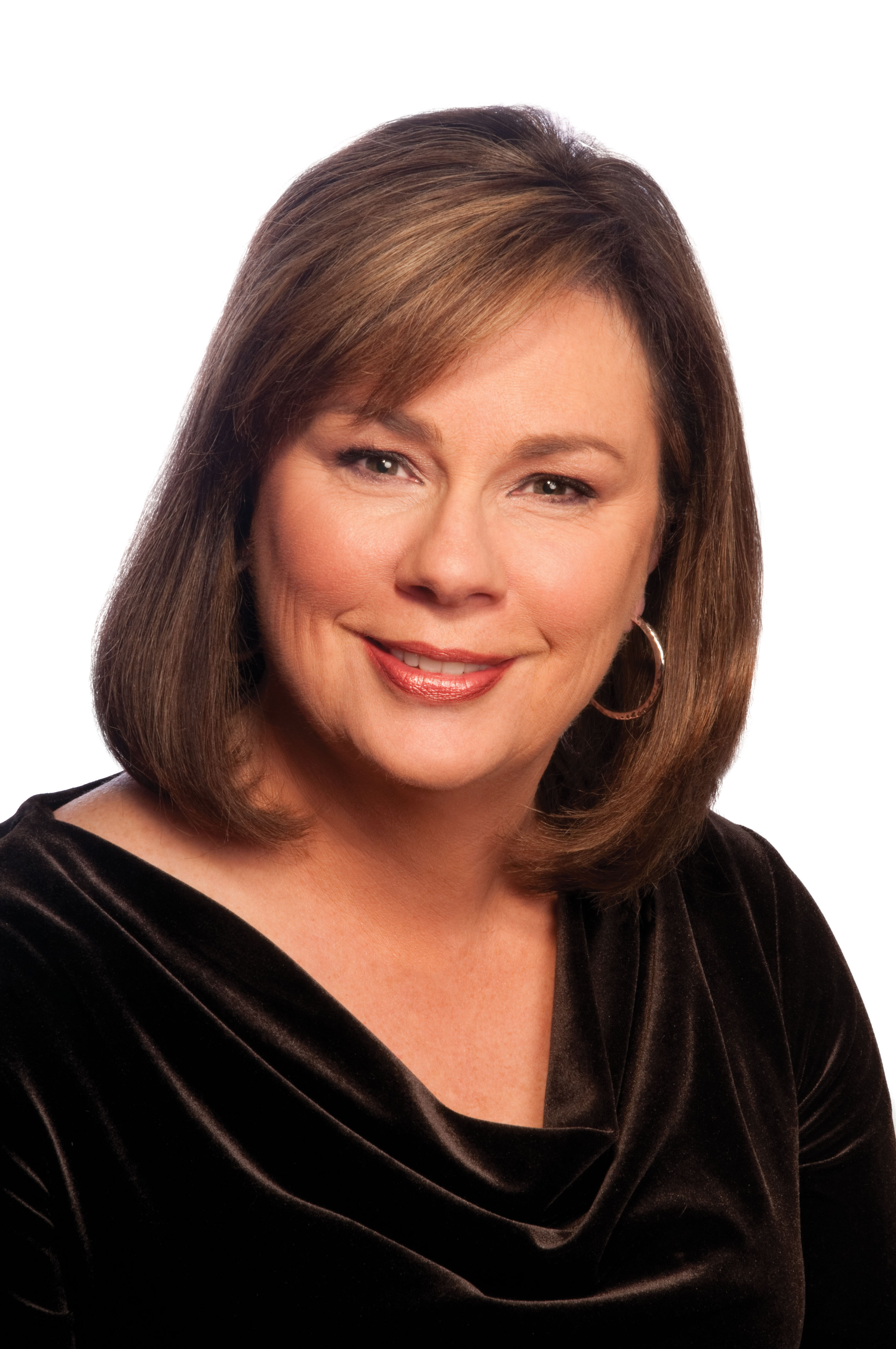
- Born: Susan Lisa Jackson; 1952 (age 73–74); United States
- Occupation: Novelist
- Writing career
- Pen name: Susan Lynn Crose
- Period: 1983–present
- Genres: Romance, Romantic Suspense, Mystery, Thriller
- Website: www.lisajackson.com

Susan Lisa Jackson (known as Lisa Jackson; born 1952) is an American author of over 75 romance novels and romantic suspense novels.

== Biography ==
Jackson was a mother when she started writing novels. Her books have appeared on The New York Times, the USA Today, and the Publishers Weekly national bestseller lists. Jackson is the author of more than 85 novels. She frequently co-authors books with her sister, Nancy Bush. She also writes under the pen name, "Susan Lynn Crose".

Several of Jackson's books include plots of adoption reunion.

== Selected works ==
=== New Orleans series ===
- Hot Blooded (May 2001)
- Cold Blooded (June 2002)
- Shiver (March 2007)
- Absolute Fear (March 2008)
- Lost Souls (February 2009)
- Malice (June 2010)
- Devious (February 2012)
- Never Die Alone (July 2015)

=== To Die series ===
- Left to Die (July 2008)
- Chosen to Die (July 2009)
- Born to Die (August 2011)
- Afraid to Die (June 2012)
- Ready to Die (August 2013)
- Deserves to Die (July 2014)
- Expecting to Die (February 2017)
- Willing to Die (April 2019)

=== Wicked series ===
Written with Nancy Bush

- Wicked Game (February 2009)
- Wicked Lies (June 2011)
- Something Wicked (June 2013)
- Wicked Ways (November 2014)

=== Savannah series ===
- The Night Before (March 2003)
- The Morning After (March 2004)
- Tell Me (July 2013)
- The Third Grave (July 2021)

=== San Francisco series ===
- If She Only Knew (October 2000)
- Almost Dead (August 2007)
- You Betrayed Me (July 2020)

=== Northwest Series ===
- Deep Freeze (February 2005)
- Fatal Burn (March 2006)
- After She's Gone (August 2016)

=== Maverick series ===
- He's a Bad Boy (1993)
- He's Just a Cowboy (1993)
- He's the Rich Boy (1993)
- He's My Soldier Boy (1994)

=== Dark Jewels series ===
- Dark Ruby (1998)
- Dark Emerald (1999)
- Dark Sapphire (2000)
- Dark Ruby / Dark Sapphire (omnibus) (2005)

=== Forever Family series ===
- A Family Kind of Girl (1999)
- A Family Kind of Guy (1999)
- A Family Kind of Wedding (1999)

=== McCaffertys series ===
- Thorne (2000)
- Matt (2001)
- Slade (2002)
- Best-Kept Lies (2004)
- Randi (2007)

=== Medieval Trilogy ===
- Impostress (2003)
- Temptress (2004)
- Sorceress (2007)

=== Novels ===
- A Twist of Fate (1983)
- Dark Side of the Moon (1984)
- Gypsy Wind (1984)
- Pirate's Gold (1984)
- Shadow of Time (1984)
- Devil's Gambit (1985)
- Dangerous Precedent (1985)
- Tears of Pride (1985)
- Innocent by Association (1985)
- Midnight Sun (1985)
- Yesterday's Lies (1986)
- Zachary's Law (1986)
- Mystic (1986)
- One Man's Love (1986)
- Renegade Son (1987)
- Snowbound (1987)
- Summer Rain (1987)
- Hurricane Force (1988)
- In Honor's Shadow (1988)
- Aftermath (1989)
- Tender Trap (1989)
- His Bride to Be (1990)
- With No Regrets (1990)
- Double Exposure (1990)
- Mystery Man (1991)
- Obsession (1991)
- Million Dollar Baby (1992)
- Sail Away (1992)
- A Husband to Remember (1993)
- Treasures (1994) (also known as See How She Dies)
- Intimacies (1995)
- Wishes (1995)
- Whispers (1996)
- The Millionaire and the Cowgirl (1996)
- New Year's Daddy (1996)
- Twice Kissed (1998)
- Unspoken (1999)
- Lone Stallion's Lady (2000)
- Wild and Wicked (2002)
- See How She Dies (2004)
- Final Scream (2005)
- Twice Kissed (2006)
- Missing (2008)
- Chosen to Die (2009)
- Running Scared (2010)
- Sweet Revenge (2010)
- Without Mercy (2010)
- You Don't Want To Know (2012)
- Confessions (2012)
- Close to Home (2014)
- You Will Pay (2017)

=== Omnibus ===
- 1993 Silhouette Christmas Stories (1993)
- Treasures / Gifts of the Heart (1994)
- Silhouette Christmas Stories (1994)
- The Parent Trap (1996) (with Kasey Michaels and Dallas Schulze)
- Tis the Season (1997) (with Elaine Coffman, Kat Martin and Katherine Sutcliffe)
- A Fortune's Children Christmas (1999) (with Barbara Boswell and Linda Turner)
- Santa Baby (2002) (with Kylie Adams, Elaine Coffman and Lisa Plumley)
- Randi / Beyond Control (2004) (with Bronwyn Jameson)
- Deck the Halls (2004) (with Marcia Evanick, Virginia Henley, Fern Michaels and Linda Lael Miller)
- Kiss Me Again: Stranger in Her Bed / Marrying Kind / Satisfy Me / Brass Ring (2005) (with Suzanne Forster, Lori Foster and Debbie Macomber)
- Strangers: Mystery Man (2005)
- Best-Kept Lies / Wild in the Moment (2005) (with Jennifer Greene)
- Billionaire's Proposition / Taking Care of Business (2006) (with Leanne Banks)
- Most Likely to Die (2007) (with Beverly Barton and Wendy Corsi Staub)
- Secrets: Pirate's Gold / Dark Side Of The Moon (2007)

== See also ==
- List of romantic novelists
- List of thriller writers
