= Zebra Books =

- Parent company: Kensington Books
- Founded: 1975
- Founder: Walter Zacharius and Roberta Bender Grossman
- Defunct: 2005
- Country of origin: United States
- Headquarters location: New York City
- Publication types: Books
- Fiction genres: historical romance, romance, western, horror, humor
- Imprints: Zebra Regency Romance (1985–2005)

Zebra Books is an imprint of American publisher Kensington Publishing Corp. As the company's flagship imprint until the late 80s, it currently publishes women's fiction, romantic suspense and bestselling historical, paranormal and contemporary romance. In the past, it was also an iconic publisher of pulp horror, and it also published westerns and humor.

== History ==
Zebra Books was launched in 1975 by Walter Zacharius, who had founded Kensington Publishing the previous year, and Roberta Bender Grossman. Both of them had previously worked for paperback house Lancer Books, co-founded by Zacharius in 1961. At the time of launching Zebra, Grossman became the youngest president of a publishing house. By keeping a low budget, small staff, and hiring overlooked if not desperate authors, they built Zebra into a powerhouse of cheap, consumable literature, with $10 million in sales annually by the early 1980s.

== Romance publishers ==
Zebra was built mostly on the historical romance genre. It later expanded the romance genre to embrace paranormal romance, adult Western romance and romance titles aimed at Hispanic, black and gay readers.

Beating the bushes for overlooked writers and eager first-timers willing to start out cheap, the partners developed the careers of prolific and profit-generating authors like Janelle Taylor and Katherine Stone. Best-selling authors on the Zebra list include Susan Wiggs, Fern Michaels, Lisa Jackson, Hannah Howell, Janet Dailey, Victoria Alexander, Mary Jo Putney, and Alexandra Ivy.

=== Zebra Regency Romance ===
Zebra Books began publishing traditional Regency romance novels in 1985, classified as Zebra Regency Romance. They generally issued an average of four romance books each month. Zebra Books eventually discontinued its traditional Regency line in October 2005.

Authors who wrote for the Zebra Regency romance line included Kathleen Baldwin, Meredith Bond, Shannon Donnelly, and Debbie Raleigh.

== Horror publishers ==
If romance novels built the house of Zebra in the 1970s, horror made it famous in the 1980s. The imprint's first hit horror title was William W. Johnstone's The Devil's Kiss in 1980. Knowing their authors were not famous enough to sell books on name alone, Zebra focused on sensational covers. Skeletons were such a recurrent theme in Zebra's covers that the imprint is nicknamed "the skeleton farm" among collectors.

Mainstay authors in Zebra's horror roster were Johnstone, Rick Hautala, and Ruby Jean Jensen. Other horror authors published were Bentley Little, Ken Greenhall, Joe R. Lansdale and William M. Carney.

Though still active in the early 1990s, by 1993 Zebra reduced its horror output to two titles per month. In 1996 it stopped publishing horror authors, focusing on romance and suspense instead.
