= Elaine Coffman =

American writer

Barbara Elaine Gunter Coffman
- Born: June 19, 1942 (age 84); San Diego, California United States
- Occupation: Novelist
- Writing career
- Pen name: Elaine Coffman
- Period: 1988–present
- Genres: Historical romance, Suspense
- Website: www.elainecoffman.com

Barbara Elaine Gunter Coffman (born June 19, 1942 in San Diego, California) is an American writer of both historical romance and suspense, writing as Elaine Coffman.

== Biography ==
Elaine Coffman is a New York Times bestselling author who has published in both the historical romance and suspense genres. Her novels take place in Scotland, Regency England, Italy and the American West. She is the author of nineteen novels and five novellas.

=== Personal ===
Barbara Elaine Gunter was born in San Diego, California, to William Samuel Gunter, Jr., a naval officer and Edna Marie (née Davidson) Gunter, a homemaker. From the age of three. she lived in Midland, Texas and graduated from Midland High School. Gunter received a degree in elementary education from North Texas State University. She taught elementary school in Midland, Texas, while working on her master's degree and certification for Language and Learning Disabilities at Texas Tech in Lubbock.

=== Writing ===
Coffman's romances have been noted for their historical research; Publishers Weekly said, in the review for The Italian, "Coffman renders Italy's plight with the exactitude of a historian."

Coffman's first suspense novel, Alone in the Dark, was published by Pocket Books in 2006.

== Awards and honours ==
Three of Coffman's books have been nominated for Best Historical Romance of the Year by Romance Writers of America. She has also received the Maggie Award, Reviewers Choice Award, and Best Western Historical Award. If You Loved Me, the last book of Coffman's Mackinnon series, was her first book to hit the New York Times bestseller list.

== Bibliography ==
=== Single novels ===
- My Enemy, My Love, 1988, reissue 1991
- If My Love Could Hold You, 1989, Dell; Fawcett reissue, 1998
- For All The Right Reasons, 1991, Dell; Fawcett reissue
- Somewhere Along The Way, 1992, Dell
- So This Is Love, 1993, Fawcett reissue
- Heaven Knows, 1994, Fawcett Books
- A Time For Roses, 1995, Fawcett Books
- When Love Comes Along, 1995, Warner Books
- If You Love Me, 1997, Fawcett Books
- Someone Like You, 1997, Fawcett Books
- The Bride of Black Douglas, 2000, MIRA
- The Fifth Daughter, 2001, MIRA
- The Italian, 2002, MIRA
- The Highlander, 2003, MIRA
- Let Me Be Your Hero, 2004, MIRA
- By Fire and By Sword, 2005, MIRA
- Alone in the Dark, 2006, Pocket Books.

=== MacKinnon Brothers Series ===
1. Angel in Marble, 1991, 1998
2. For All The Right Reasons, 1991
3. Somewhere Along The Way, 1992
4. So This Is Love, 1993, Fawcett Books
5. Heaven Knows, 1994, Fawcett Books
6. When Love Comes Along, 1995, Warner Books
7. If You Love Me, 1997, Fawcett Books.

=== The Italian Chronicles Series ===
1. The Fifth Daughter, 2001
2. The Italian, 2002.

=== The Graham-Lenox Family Saga ===
1. The Highlander, 2003
2. Let Me Be Your Hero, 2004
3. By Fire and By Sword, 2006.

=== Anthologies ===
- The Bride of the Black Scot, From the Anthology: To Have and to Hold, 1994, Avon Books
- A Ribbon of Moonlight, From the Anthology, Midsummer Nights Madness, 1995, St. Martin's Press
- The Bride of Blackness Castle, From the Anthology: 1996, Outlaw Brides, Harlequin; The Bride of Blackness Castle, Reprint Anthology, 2002, A Gentleman of Substance
- Playing With Fire, From the Anthology: Seeing Fireworks, 1997 St. Martin's Press
- Under The Mistletoe, From the Anthology: ‘Tis The Season, 1997, Zebra Under The Mistletoe, Reprint Anthology, Santa Baby, 2002, Zebra.
