= Kat Martin =

American novelist

Kathleen Kelly Martin
- Born: July 14, 1947 (age 79); Central Valley of California, United States
- Education: University of California, Santa Barbara
- Occupation: Novelist
- Writing career
- Pen name: Kat Martin, Kathy Lawrence (with Larry Jay Martin), Kasey Marx
- Period: 1988–present
- Genre: Romance
- Website: katbooks.com

Kathleen Kelly Martin (born July 14, 1947) is an American writer of romance novels under the pen names of Kat Martin, Kathy Lawrence and Kasey Marx. She is married to writer and photographer Larry Jay Martin.

== Biography ==
Martin was born in the Central Valley of California. She obtained a degree in Anthropology and also studied History at the University of California, Santa Barbara.

She lives with her husband, writer and photographer Larry Jay Martin in Missoula, Montana. They have collaborated on a book under the pseudonym of Kathy Lawrence.

Martin is a member of the Romance Writers of America. To date, she has been published in England, Spain, Italy, Greece, Germany, Norway, Sweden, Bulgaria, Russia, South Africa, China, and Korea.

== Bibliography ==
=== As Kat Martin ===
==== Single novels ====
- Magnificent Passage (1988)
- Dueling Hearts (1989)
- Captain's Bride (1990)
- Lover's Gold (1991)
- Bold Angel (1994)
- The Dream (1995)
- Midnight Rider (1996)
- Christmas Angel in This is the Season (1997) & in Five Golden Rings (2000)
- Night Secrets (1999)
- The Secret (2001)
- Hot Rain (2002)
- Secret Ways (2003)

==== Southern series ====
1. Creole Fires (1992)
2. Savannah Heat (1993)
3. Natchez Flame (1994)

==== Garrick family series (Lords Trilogy Series) ====
1. Gypsy Lord (1992)
2. Sweet Vengeance (1993)
3. Devil's Prize (1995)

==== Kingsland series ====
1. Innocence Undone (1997)
2. Dangerous Passions (1998)

==== Litchfield series ====
1. Nothing but Velvet (1997)
2. Silk and Steel (2000)

==== Clayton series ====
1. Wicked Promise (1998)
2. Perfect Sin (2000)

==== Heartless series ====
1. Heartless (2001)
2. The Fire Inside (2001)
3. Fanning the Flame (2002)

==== Heart Series ====
1. Heart of Honor (2007)
2. Heart of Fire (2008)
3. Heart of Courage (2009)

==== Sinclair sisters series ====
1. Midnight Sun (2003)
2. Desert Heart (2004)
3. Deep Blue (2005)

==== Necklace series ====
1. The Bride Necklace (2005)
2. The Devil's Necklace (2005)
3. The Handmaiden's Necklace (2006)

=== The Bride Trilogy ===
1. Royal's Bride (2009)
2. Reese's Bride (Jan 2010)
3. Rule's Bride (May 2010)

=== The Raines of Wind Canyon ===
1. Against the Wind (January 2011)
2. Against the Fire (February 2011)
3. Against the Law (March 2011)
4. Against the Storm (November 2011)
5. Against the Night (March 2012)
6. Against the Sun (June 2012)
7. Against the Odds (March 2013)
8. Against the Edge (April 2013)
9. Against the Mark (August 2013)
10. Against the Wild (May 2014)

=== As Kathy Lawrence (with Larry Jay Martin) ===
==== Single novel ====
- Tin Angel (1989)

=== As Kasey Mars ===
==== Single novels ====
- The Silent Rose (1995)

== References and resources ==
- Kathleen Kelly Martin's Official Website
