= Brenda Joyce (author) =

American novelist

- Born: Brenda Dworman c. 1963; New York, U.S.
- Occupation: Novelist
- Writing career
- Pen name: Brenda Joyce, B.D. Joyce
- Period: 1988 – present
- Genres: historical romance, contemporary romance, paranormal historical romance
- Website: www.brendajoyce.com

Brenda Joyce (born c. 1963, New York State) is an American author of romance novels, who also signed a novel as B.D. Joyce.

== Biography ==
Joyce, a native of New York, wrote her first novella when she was sixteen, and finished her first novel at twenty-five. She sold her novel quickly, and since that first publication in 1988 she has published thirty-four novels.

Her first novel, Innocent Fire, won the Best Western Romance award from the Romance Writers of America. She has also been awarded the Best Historical Romance Award and Romantic Times' Lifetime Achievement Award. There are currently eleven million copies of her novels in print in 12 countries. Joyce has had success in both the historical and contemporary romance genres.

== Family ==
Joyce is married to an Israeli man who once commanded an anti-terrorist unit in Lebanon. The couple and their son live in Arizona.

== Books ==
=== The de Warenne Dynasty ===
- The Conqueror (Sep 1990)
- Promise of the Rose (Nov 1993)
- The Game (Nov 1994)
- House of Dreams (Sep 2002)
- The Prize (Oct 2004)
- The Masquerade (Sep 2005)
- The Stolen Bride (Oct 2006)
- A Lady at Last (Dec 2006)
- The Perfect Bride (July 2007)
- A Dangerous Love (2008)
- An Impossible Attraction (March 2010)
- The Promise (September 2010)

=== Bragg Saga ===
- Innocent Fire (Jun 1988)
- Firestorm (Nov 1988)
- Violet Fire (May 1989)
- Dark Fires (Jun 1991)
- The Darkest Heart (Dec 1989)
- Fires of Paradise (Apr 1992)
- Scandalous Love (Nov 1992)
- Secrets (Apr 1993) (Bragg/Delanza Series)

=== The Delanzas ===
- Five Golden Rings (Anthology)
- A Gift of Joy (Anthology)
- After Innocence
- Secrets

=== Other Historicals ===
- The Rival
- Splendor
- Captive

=== St. Georges ===
- Beyond Scandal
- The Finer Things

=== Deadly Series ===
- Deadly Love (January 2001) [Originally as B.D. Joyce]
- Deadly Pleasure (March 2002)
- Deadly Affairs (April 2002)
- Deadly Desire (May 2002)
- Deadly Caress (April 2003)
- Deadly Promise (November 2003)
- Deadly Illusions (February 2005)
- Deadly Kisses (February 2006)
- Deadly Vows (March 2011)

=== Master of Time Series ===
- Dark Seduction (May 2007)
- Dark Rival (October 2007)
- Dark Embrace (September 2008)
- Dark Victory (March 2009)
- Dark Lover (July 2009)

=== The Spymasters Men Series ===
- Seduction (January 2012)
- Persuasion (August 2012)
- Surrender (February 2013)

== Sources ==
- Buonfiglio, Michelle (October 28, 2005). "AuthorView:Brenda Joyce". Internet Broadcasting Systems, Inc. Archived from the original on September 30, 2007.
