= Regency novel =

Novels written and set during the Regency era of the UK

The Regency era in the United Kingdom is the period between 1811 and 1820, when King George III was deemed unfit to rule and his son, later George IV, was instated to be his proxy as prince regent. It was a decade of particular manners and fashions and overlaps with the Napoleonic period in Europe.

Regency novels are of two main types:

- Classic Regency fiction, or fiction actually written during the Regency era - The works of Jane Austen, Sir Walter Scott, Susan Ferrier, and Maria Edgeworth would fall into this category.
- Modern Regency fiction, or later fiction set within the Regency era. - These include romance novels (called "Regency romances"), historical fiction, detective fiction, and military fiction.

In both cases the setting is typically Regency England, although the settings can sometimes be extended to the European continent or to the various British colonies of the same time period. Traits often found in both types include a highly developed sense of social standing on the part of the characters, emphasis on "manners" and class issues, and the emergence of modern social thought amongst the upper classes of England.

== Classic Regency fiction ==
This includes works which were actually written between 1811 and 1820, during the Regency era, which is well known for romantic fiction, including the works of Percy Bysshe Shelley, Sir Walter Scott, Susan Ferrier, Maria Edgeworth, E. T. A. Hoffmann, and Jane Austen, who is perhaps the best-known author from this period, with many of her novels having been adapted into film in recent years. All of these writers published most of their best-known works during this period. While not novelists, the poetry of writers such as Lord Byron, William Blake, William Wordsworth, and John Keats are worth mentioning, as most of their best-known works were also written during the Regency.

Many of these classic Regency writers are also associated with Romanticism, which is an artistic and intellectual movement that originated in Western Europe in the late 18th century. Romanticism expressed a revolt against the aristocratic, social, and political norms of the Enlightenment period which preceded it. Works during this period stressed strong emotion as a source of aesthetic experience, placing new emphasis on such emotions as anxiety, horror, and the awe experienced when confronting the sublimity of nature. All of these themes are evident in the best-known classic Regency works.

A marriage based on love was rarely an option for most women in the British Regency, as securing a steady and sufficient income was the first consideration for both the woman and her family. This is most likely why this period yielded so many examples of literary romance: it gave many women the opportunity to live vicariously through the novel's heroine, who generally married someone she loved deeply.

Mary Shelley's Frankenstein was published in 1818, also falling within the Regency era. Some consider it to be the single piece of British literature that best reflects the interests and concerns of the time, specifically the fascination with and fear of the science and technological advances of the times. It is a classic example of horror fiction.

== Modern Regency fiction ==
Fiction set in the Regency period grew in popularity during the late 20th century, leading to an increased number of novels in all of the categories. Authors generally attempt to write in a more British style, even if they are American, and they tend to favor slightly more formal or historical language. Despite painstaking detail of historical accuracy, some criticize modern Regency novels for the behavior of the protagonists being more reflective of modern times than of the early 1800s.

=== Historical semi-fiction ===
This includes modern works based in the Regency that do not fall into any of the other categories, and may include historical characters such as the Prince Regent, or other notable historical figures during the Regency era. They may even be fiction based on a true story, where true events are expanded into a narrative that contains elements of fiction. It may also feature notable historical occurrences during the Regency, such as the slave trade to the Americas and the barbary slave trade of Europeans in northern Africa. Many north African slave narratives were written during this time, some of which have been adapted into modern novels set in the Regency, such as author Tahir Shah's Timbuctoo, an historical romance based on the real-life story of Robert Adams and set primarily in Regency England.

=== Military fiction ===
The Napoleonic Wars were a series of wars that were declared against Napoleon's French Empire by opposing coalitions that ran from 1803 to 1815, coinciding almost exactly with the Regency Era. They include the War between Britain and France, which lasted from 1803 to 1814. Military fiction set in the Regency generally includes characters from British troops who were involved in this war. Well-known authors include Bernard Cornwell, C.S. Forester, and Patrick O'Brian.

=== Mysteries ===
These include mystery novels set in Regency-era England, some of which have been written as a series, such as Kate Ross's four-book series featuring the character Julian Kestrel. Other well-known authors include: Stephanie Barron, Carrie Bebris, Ashley Gardner, and Rosemary Stevens.

=== Romances ===
The Regency period, overlapping as it does with the Napoleonic War period in Europe, offers the opportunity for high drama, with wounded heroes, mystery, and adventure, and thus would help to explain the popularity of Regency romance novels in particular. Well-known authors include: Mary Balogh, Jo Beverley, Nancy Butler, Marion Chesney, Georgette Heyer, Lisa Kleypas, Stephanie Laurens, Sorcha MacMurrough, Amanda McCabe Barbara Metzger, Julia Quinn, and Joan Smith.

Many readers and writers of Regency romance make a distinction between "traditional Regency romance" (also known as "Regency romance"), "traditional Regency" (also known as "trad"), and "Regency historical". Many authors have written both traditionals and historicals, including Mary Balogh, Jo Beverley, Susan Carroll, Loretta Chase, Suzanne De Launton, Edith Layton, Mary Jo Putney, and Barbara Metzger.

==== Christian Regency romance ====
This genre includes modern romance novels set in the Regency with strong Christian themes. Authors include Bonnie Blythe, Heather Diane, Laurie Alice Eakes, Julie Klassen, and Ruth Axtell Morren. There is generally a strong romantic theme throughout these novels, without the racy sex scenes often found in other modern Regency works.

==== Traditional Regency romance ====
The Regency-set books published by the Fawcett Coventry line are all considered to be "trads", or traditional Regency works. The distinction rests on the genre definition of regency romance: works in the tradition of Georgette Heyer, with an emphasis on the primary romance plot, would be considered traditional. Traditional Regency romance writers usually pay close attention to historical detail, as their readers are notorious for noting errors, and the authors often do extensive research so they can clearly understand and replicate the voice of the genre.

==== Regency historical romance ====
The Regency-set books written by authors such as Karen Robards, Amanda Quick, Christina Dodd, and Suzanne De Launton are generally considered to be Regency historical works. Signet Regency romances were also popular for many years, and can still be found online second-hand. Regency romances which may include more social realism, or, conversely, anachronistically modern characterization, might be classed by some as "Regency historical", signifying that their general setting is in Regency England, but the plot, characterization, or prose style of the work extends beyond the genre formula of the Regency romances published by Heyer and Fawcett Characters may behave according to modern values, rather than Regency values.

The sensual Regency historical romance has been made popular in recent years by Mary Balogh, Jo Beverley, Lisa Kleypas, Stephanie Laurens, Sorcha MacMurrough, and Julia Quinn. Balogh and Beverley, in addition to Loretta Chase are three authors who have made the transition from writing traditional Regency novels to Regency historical novels. These novels are much more explicit than the traditional Regency works, and include many more love scenes, which tend to be racy. In addition, these novels are often published in a series, with groups of friends of either gender the focus of interest as they get married off one by one.

== Major writers of classic Regency fiction ==
- Jane Austen (1775–1817)
- Maria Edgeworth (1768–1849)
- Susan Ferrier (1782–1854)
- E. T. A. Hoffmann (1776–1822)
- Sir Walter Scott (1771–1832)
- Mary Shelley (1797–1851)
- Percy Bysshe Shelley (1792–1822)
- Johann David Wyss (1743–1818)
- Washington Irving (1785-1859)
- Henry Smothers (1788-1813)

== Major writers of modern Regency fiction ==
- Mary Balogh (born 1944)
- Jo Beverley (born 1947)
- Susan Carroll (born 1952)
- Loretta Chase (born 1949)
- Lecia Cornwall
- Georgette Heyer (1902–1974)
- Mary Jo Putney
- Amanda Quick

== Major Classic Regency books ==
- The Sketch Book of Geoffrey Crayon, Gent. by Washington Irving (1819-1820)
- Mansfield Park by Jane Austen (1814)
- Waverley; or, 'Tis Sixty Years Since by Sir Walter Scott (1814)
