= Judith McNaught =

American writer

Judith Spaeth McNaught Smith
- Born: May 10, 1944 (age 82); San Luis Obispo, California, U.S.
- Education: Northwestern University
- Occupation: Novelist
- Spouses: 2# Michael McNaught (until 1983); 3# Don Smith (until 1993)
- Children: 2
- Writing career
- Pen name: Judith McNaught
- Period: 1978–present
- Genres: Romance, Suspense
- Website: judithmcnaught.com

Judith McNaught (born May 10, 1944) is a bestselling author of over a dozen historical and contemporary romance novels, with 30 million copies of her works in print. She was also the first female executive producer at a CBS radio station.

== Early career ==
Born on May 10, 1944, in San Luis Obispo, she majored in Business at Northwestern University. She married a St. Louis dentist and had two children, a daughter, Whitney, and a son, Clayton, before her divorce.

Before gaining success as a writer, McNaught had previously worked as an assistant director for a film crew, an assistant controller of a major trucking company, president of a temporary employment agency, and president of an executive search firm. She also was the first female executive producer at a CBS radio station.

She met her second husband, Michael "Mike" McNaught, while working as an assistant director for a film crew, working on a movie for a General Motors division. McNaught was the director of public relations for the company. Between them, they had seven children, her two and his five from a previous marriage. Her husband encouraged her to write, buying her a new typewriter and being supportive through the years that publishers rejected her novels.

McNaught's first manuscript was Whitney, My Love, which she wrote between 1978 and 1982. After having difficulty selling that novel, she wrote and sold Tender Triumph in early 1982. She received the book cover for Tender Triumph on June 20, 1983—the day after her husband was killed in an accident.

== Success ==
Whitney, My Love, the first manuscript, was finally published in 1985, after McNaught had proven herself with two successful published novels. Unaware that there were rules that most Regency romances followed, McNaught's early novels were unique. Her novels introduced the hero first, rather than the heroine. Unlike the typical Regency, "a light romp with no sex," her novels tended to be "intensely sensual and witty." The book is now credited with inventing the genre today known as the Regency Historical. Whitney, My Love captured the elements of the traditional Regency romance, but its long length, sensuality, and emotional intensity were more often associated with the traditional historical romances, which were rarely set during the Regency period. Despite the many years it took to sell the story, it was very successful, and its success influenced other editors to solicit manuscripts written in the same style.

At the beginning of McNaught's writing career, she was one of a very few authors writing for the historical romance market. By 1985, however, the genre had exploded, and over 50 new historical romances were being published each month, many of them full-length historicals set in the Regency period like McNaught's. Despite her years of success in the historical romance genre, in 1990 McNaught switched genres to write contemporary romances, hopeful that she would have a better opportunity to distinguish her work in a less-saturated market. As her career has continued to mature, McNaught has gradually introduced elements of suspense into her writing. Regardless of their genre, however, her books tend to be fast-paced and feature strong, loyal, compassionate, intelligent female characters.

McNaught was one of the first romance authors to receive a multimillion-dollar contract and have her novels published in hardcover, better positioning them for review by major publications. She reached the New York Times Bestseller List for the first time in 1988, and all of her subsequent books have also placed on the NYT Bestseller List. After one of her novels placed on the New York Times Best Seller List for the first time, McNaught asked her publisher to change the covers of all future releases. Instead of the common bodice-ripping cover, McNaught wished her books to be packaged with "classy" covers.

In the early 1990s, Coors Brewing asked her to write a book that would appeal to women and could be used by the company to promote its women's literacy program. Appalled at the discovery that one in five women was functionally illiterate, McNaught offered to rewrite her almost-completed manuscript, Perfect to insert the literacy theme. The change took her an additional six weeks to incorporate. McNaught chose to donate a portion of her earnings from the book to women's literacy programs and insisted that each book contain a card giving readers information on how to donate to literacy programs or to become tutors.

She was the keynote speaker at the Romance Writers of America Conference in 1996, and in 1997, Texas Women's Monthly selected her among their four favorite authors, with John Grisham, Patricia Cornwell, and Dean Koontz. She has also been awarded a Romantic Times Career Achievement Award and had a Number 1 New York Times Bestseller with the romantic suspense Night Whispers.

== Personal life ==
While McNaught at one time lived in Saint Louis, Missouri, she moved to Texas after falling in love with Dallas while on a book tour. Her third marriage, to Don Smith, a professional golfer and engineer, ended in May 1993. McNaught described the break-up as peaceful and friendly, and she threw a party for 160 friends to celebrate entering a new phase of her life. As of 2007, she lives in Frisco, Texas. McNaught is active in children's charity and with breast cancer causes, and she has recently begun promoting literacy issues. After creating a subplot on literacy in her novel Perfect, McNaught asked her publishers to include a response card in the book packaging. Because of its inclusion, thousands of women who had read the book volunteered to become tutors and help people learn to read.

== Selected awards ==
- 1985 - Romantic Times Career Achievement Award for Best New Historical Romance, Whitney, My Love
- 1986 - Romantic Times Reviewers' Choice Award for Best Harlequin Superromance, Tender Triumph
- 1987 - Affaire de Coeur Golden Pen Certificate, Once and Always
- 1987 - Affaire de Coeur Reviewer's Choice Award for Best Historical Romance, Once and Always

== Bibliography ==
=== Historicals ===
==== Westmoreland Dynasty Saga ====
1. A Kingdom of Dreams (1989)
2. Whitney, My Love (1985)
3. Until You (1994)
4. "Miracles" in A Holiday of Love (1995/Oct) (with Jill Barnett, Jude Deveraux, Arnette Lamb) & in Simple Gifts (1997) (with Jude Deveraux)

==== Sequels Series ====
1. Once and Always (1987)
2. Something Wonderful (1988)
3. Almost Heaven (1990)

=== Contemporaries ===
==== Single novels ====
- Tender Triumph (1983)
- Double Standards (1984)

==== Paradise Series ====
1. Paradise (1991)
2. Perfect (1993)
3. Night Whispers (1998)
4. Someone to Watch Over Me (2003)
5. Every Breath You Take (2005)

==== Foster Saga ====
1. "Double Exposure" in A Gift of Love (1995) (with Kimberly Cates, Jude Deveraux, Andrea Kane, Judith O'Brien)
2. Remember When (1996)
