= Jill Barnett =

American novelist

- Born: June 17; Southern California, U.S.
- Occupation: Novelist
- Writing career
- Period: 1990–present
- Genres: Women's fiction, historical, romance
- Website: www.jillbarnett.com

Jill Barnett is a New York Times best-selling American author of women's fiction and romance novels.

In 1988, Jill Barnett sold her first novel, The Heart's Haven, to Pocket Books. It was published two years later, and spent three weeks on the bestseller list. She continued to write for Pocket for twenty years. Her early novels were historical romances, set in diverse times and places, ranging from medieval England to 19th-century America. Unlike many romance novels, Barnett's often include unique points of view; one novel was written from the perspective of the heroine and the hero's seven-year-old daughter; the hero's perspective was not told. Barnett takes care to ensure that her books are historically accurate. She was the first historical romance author to receive a starred review in Publishers Weekly.

Barnett has written over seventeen novels and short stories. Her novels have been published in twenty-one languages, and there are more than seven million copies of her books in print. She is the recipient of the Waldenbook Award, several Romantic Times Awards, and her books have appeared on such bestseller lists as USA Today, the Washington Post, Publishers Weekly, and the New York Times.

== Bibliography ==
=== Historical Novels ===
- The Heart's Haven (1990)
- Surrender a Dream (1991)
- Just a Kiss Away (1991)
- Bewitching (1994)
- Dreaming (1994)
- Imagine (1995)
- Carried Away (1996)
- Wonderful (1997)
- Wild (1998)
- Wicked (1999)

=== Contemporary Novels ===
- Sentimental Journey (2001)
- The Days of Summer (2006)

Bridge to Happiness (2012)

=== Anthologies in collaboration ===
- A Holiday of Love (1994) (with Jude Deveraux, Arnette Lamb and Judith McNaught)
- A Midsummer Night's Madness (1995) (with Elaine Coffman, Alexis Harrington and Sonia Simone)
- A Stockingful of Joy(1997) (with Justine Dare, Susan King and Mary Jo Putney)
- That Summer Place (1998) (with Debbie Macomber and Susan Wiggs)
- A Season in the Highlands 2000) (with Jude Deveraux)

== See also ==
- List of romantic novelists
