= Louise Allen (novelist) =

British writer (born 1949)

Melanie Hilton
- Born: 1949 (age 76–77); Norfolk, England
- Occupation: Novelist
- Spouse: yes
- Writing career
- Pen name: Francesca Shaw (in collaboration), Louise Allen
- Language: English
- Period: 1993–present
- Genre: Romantic novel
- Notable awards: RoNA Award
- Website: louiseallenregency.com

Louise Allen is the pseudonym used by Melanie Hilton (born 1949), a British writer of romance novels since 1993. She started writing in collaboration with a friend under the pen name of Francesca Shaw. Her novels The Piratical Miss Ravenhurst in 2011 and Scandal’s Virgin in 2014 won the Love Story of the Year by the Romantic Novelists' Association.

== Biography ==
Melanie Hilton was born in 1949 in Norfolk, England, United Kingdom. She obtained a degree in geography and archaeology. She lived in Bedfordshire and then moved to Cley on the North Norfolk coast with her husband.

== Bibliography ==
=== As Francesca Shaw ===
==== Single novels ====
- Master of Winterbourne (1993)
- Miss Weston's Masquerade (1994)
- A Compromised Lady (1995)
- The Unconventional Miss Dane (1997)
- The Admiral's Daughter (1999)
- The Youngest Dowager (2000)
- A Scandalous Lady (2002)
- The Rebellious Bride (2002)
- Lord of Scandal (2007)

==== Anthologies in collaboration ====
- The Regency Rakes (Virtuous Cyprian / Unconventional Miss Dane) (2002) (with Nicola Cornick)
- The Regency Rakes (Lady Polly / The Admiral's Daughter) (2003) (with Nicola Cornick)
- Regency Brides Collection (The Youngest Dowager / Master of Tamasee) (2004) (with Helen Dickson)
- The Regency Lords & Ladies Collection (A Scandalous Lady / The Gentleman's Demand) (2005) (with Meg Alexander)
- Regency Brides Bundle (The Rebellious Bride / The Viscount's Bride / The Penniless Bride) (2007) (with Nicola Cornick and Ann Elizabeth Cree)
- The Regency Lords & Ladies Collection (Duke's Mistress / The Rebellious Bride) (2008) (with Ann Elizabeth Cree)

=== As Louise Allen ===
==== Single novels ====
- One Night with a Rake (2003)
- The Earl's Intended Wife (2004)
- The Society Catch (2004)
- A Model Débutante (2005)
- The Marriage Debt (2005)
- Moonlight and Mistletoe (2005)
- The Viscount's Betrothal (2006)
- The Bride's Seduction (2006)
- Not Quite a Lady (2006)
- A Most Unconventional Courtship (2007)
- No Place for a Lady (2007)
- Virgin Slave, Barbarian King (2007)

==== Novellas ====
- A Mistletoe Masquerade (2008)

==== Those Scandalous Ravenhursts Series ====
1. The Dangerous Mr Ryder (2008)
2. The Outrageous Lady Felsham (2008)
3. The Shocking Lord Standon (2008)
4. The Disgraceful Mr Ravenhurst (2009)
5. The Notorious Mr Hurst (2009)
6. The Piratical Miss Ravenhurst (2009)
7. The Mutinous Miss Ravenhurst (2010)

==== The Transformation of the Shelley Sisters Series ====
1. Practical Widow to Passionate Mistress (2010)
2. Vicar's Daughter to Viscount's Lady (2010)
3. Innocent Courtesan to Adventurer's Bride (2010)

==== Danger & Desire Series ====
1. Ravished by the Rake (2011)
2. Seduced by the Scoundrel (2011)
3. Married to a Stranger (2011)

==== Lords of Disgrace Series ====
1. His Housekeeper's Christmas Wish (2015)
2. His Christmas Countess (2015)
3. The Many Sins of Chris de Faux (2016)
4. The Unexpected Marriage of Gabriel Stone (2016)

==== Herriad Series ====
1. Forbidden Jewel of India (2012)
2. Tarnished Amongst the Ton (2013)
3. Surrender to the Marquis (2017)

==== Dangerous Deceptions Series ====
1. Loving the Lost Duke (2017)
2. The Swordmaster's Mistress (2017)
3. The Viscount's Dangerous Liaison (2018)

==== Time into Time Series ====
1. An Earl Out of Time (2017)
2. A Kiss Across Time (2018)
3. A Love For the Moment (2019)
4. A Dangerous Time For Love (2020)
5. The Hazardous Measure of Love (2021)

The Clock House Mysteries Series (spinoff of Time into Time Series)

1. Love's Vengeance (2021)
2. Murder Past, Love Present (2022)
3. Time's Perilous Desire (2023)
4. The Discovery of Death (2023)
5. Honeymoon with Death (2024)
6. Echoes Of A Fatal Past (2024)
7. A Debt Owed To Death (2025)

The Janus House Secrets Series (spinoff of Time into Time Series)

1. The Alchemy of Love and Death (2025)
2. Deadly Obsession (2026)

==== Silk & Scandal Series Multi-Author ====
1. The Lord and the Wayward Lady (2010)
7. The Officer and the Proper Lady (2010)

==== Omnibus ====
- A Model Débutante / The Marriage Debt / Moonlight and Mistletoe (2006)
- Regency Pleasures (A Model Débutante / The Marriage Debt) (2011)

==== Anthologies in collaboration ====
- Christmas Brides (The Greek's Christmas Baby / Moonlight and Mistletoe) (2005) (with Lucy Monroe)
- Hot Desert Nights (Mistress To A Sheikh / Desert Rake / Blackmailed By The Sheikh) (2007) (with Kim Lawrence and Lucy Monroe)
- Dutiful Rake / One Night with a Rake (2008) (with Elizabeth Rolls)
- Married by Christmas (Silent Night Man / Christmas Reunion / A Mistletoe Masquerade) (2008) (with Catherine George and Diana Palmer)
- Silent Night Man / Christmas Reunion / Mistletoe Masquerade (2008) (with Catherine George and Diana Palmer)
- Sparhawk's Lady / Earl's Intended Wife (2009) (with Miranda Jarrett)
- Together by Christmas (The Unmasking of Lady Loveless / Christmas Reunion / A Mistletoe Masquerade) (2009) (with vNicola Cornick and Catherine George)
- Pleasurably Undone! (Seducing a Stranger / The Viking's Forbidden Love-Slave / Disrobed and Dishonored / A Night for Her Pleasure / The Unlacing of Miss Leigh) (2010) (with Terri Brisbin, Diane Gaston, Christine Merrill and Michelle Willingham)
- Wicked Regency Nights (The Unmasking of Lady Loveless / Disrobed and Dishonoured / Libertine Lord, Pickpocket Miss / The Unlacing of Miss Leigh / Notorious Lord, Compromised Miss) (2010) (with Annie Burrows, Nicola Cornick, Diane Gaston and Bronwyn Scott)
- Snowbound Wedding Wishes (An Earl Beneath the Mistletoe / Twelfth Night Proposal / Christmas at Oakhurst Manor) (2012) (with Lucy Ashford and Joanna Fulford)
