= Diane Farr (writer) =

American novelist

Diane Farr is an American historical romance novelist. She is best known for her Regency romance, published with Signet Regency romances.

== Biography ==
Diane Farr was born in San Jose, California.

Her first book The Nobody, her second book Fair Game (1999), and her fourth book Once Upon a Christmas were each finalists for the "Best Regency" RITA award in the year of their publication. Additionally, The Nobody was a finalist for the "Best First Book" RITA award and won Romantic Times magazine's Reviewers' Choice Award for "Best First Regency" in 1999. RITAs are awarded annually by Romance Writers of America Romance Writers of America. However, her Regency romances which featured no sex scenes or mild sensuality (and were thus classified as traditional Regencies) weren't marketed properly, and didn't sell as much as expected. In the mid-2000s, Signet stopped publishing traditional Regencies and Farr lost her writing contract, shortly after publishing four longer traditional Regencies (which were wrongly marketed as Regency historicals).

Farr then published a young-adult paranormal novel Wicked Cool, published in 2010 by Cerridwen Press and subsequently offered in print form through CreateSpace by the author. She is also the author of A Month of Sundays, and four short plays published by Russell House. Some of her books, long out of print, have been republished as e-books and are now available through the usual sources.

She lives in northern California.

== Literary influences ==
Farr's third book Falling for Chloe is a sly homage to the novelist Georgette Heyer with one of Heyer's hero's Lord Sheringham (Friday's Child, published 1944) and his horse mentioned in Chapter One, and the hero and heroine attending a ball given at Alverstoke House, owned by another of Heyer's heroes the Marquess of Alverstoke (Frederica, published 1965). For those who enjoy reading Heyer, this particular book may be more enjoyable for its allusions to some of Heyer's more popular heroes.

Farr uses accurate and period-appropriate language and is careful with her historical details, as are most traditional Regencies. Her books are more enjoyed by those who prefer a sweet, mildly sensual story, which is period-appropriate. However, her stories tend to be character-driven rather than plot-driven, and some readers may be put off by that. One novel which is also plot-driven is The Fortune Hunter.

Farr has described her style of writing and why she does not write sex scenes, as well as given some tips to aspiring writers in electronic chats.

== Works ==
- The Nobody Signet Regency (1999)
- Fair Game Signet Regency (1999), republished with some additions as Playing to Win
- Falling for Chloe Signet Regency (2000)
- Once Upon a Christmas Signet Regency (2000)
- The Fortune Hunter Signet Books (2002), a longer traditional Regency
- Duel of Hearts Signet Books (2002), a longer traditional Regency
- Under the Wishing Star Signet Books (2003), a longer traditional Regency
- Under a Lucky Star. Signet Books. 2004. ISBN 978-0-451-21170-5. "diane farr author.", a longer traditional Regency
- Wicked Cool, CreateSpace, 2010, ISBN 978-1-4563-4248-7
- Playing to Win ISBN 978-1466296633, a longer version of Fair Game (1999)
- Scary Cool, CreateSpace, 2012, ISBN 978-1480200777
