= Andrea Kane =

American novelist

- Born: 1956 (age 69–70); Martinsville, Bridgewater, New Jersey
- Occupation: Novelist
- Writing career
- Period: 1991–present
- Genres: Romance, Historical, Contemporary, Suspense
- Website: www.andreakane.com

Andrea Kane is an American author of romance novels and suspense novels. She has resided in the Martinsville section of Bridgewater Township, New Jersey, United States, with her husband Brad and daughter Wendi.

== Bibliography ==
=== Single novels ===
- Dream Castle (July 1992)
- Masque of Betrayal (June 1993)
- Emerald Garden (January 1996)
- The Music Box (March 1998)
- Run For Your Life (November 2000)
- No Way Out (November 2001)
- Scent of Danger (February 2003)
- I'll Be Watching You (January 2006)
- Wrong place, wrong time (July 2008)

=== Barrett Family series ===
1. My Heart's Desire (October 1991)
2. Samantha (December 1994)

=== Kingsley in Love series ===
1. Echoes in the Mist (February 1994)
2. Wishes in the Wind (August 1996)

=== Black Diamond series ===
1. Legacy of the Diamond (February 1997)
2. The Black Diamond (November 1997)

=== Thornton-Bromleigh Family series ===
1. The Last Duke (June 1995)
2. "Yuletide Treasure" in A Gift of Love (November 1996)
3. The Theft (October 1998)

=== Colby's Coin series ===
1. The Gold Coin (August 1999)
2. The Silver Coin (September 1999)

=== Sloane Burbank series ===
1. Twisted (August 2009)
2. Drawn in Blood (September 2009)

=== Peter "Monty" Montgomery series ===
1. Wrong Place, Wrong Time (March 2007)
2. Dark Room (April 2007)

=== Forensic Instincts Suspense novel series ===
1. The Girl Who Disappeared Twice (May 2012)
2. The Line Between Here and Gone (June 2012)
3. The Stranger You Know (September 2013)
4. The Silence That Speaks (April 2015)
5. The Murder That Never Was (May 2016)
6. A Face to Die For (September 2017)

=== Anthologies in collaboration ===
- "Yuletide Treasure" in A Gift of Love (November 1996) (with Judith McNaught, Jude Deveraux, Kimberly Cates and Judith O'Brien)
- "Stone Cold" in Wait Until Dark (May 2001) (with Linda Anderson, Karen Robards and Mariah Stewart)

== See also ==
- List of romantic novelists

== Sources ==
- Andrea Kane's Official Homepage
- Andrea Kane in FantasticFiction
