= Threads of Destiny (disambiguation) =

Threads of Destiny is a 2006 cell phone novel series by Mei that was adapted into a television and film project of the same name in 2008.

Threads of Destiny(s) may also refer to:

- Threads of Destiny (1914 film), a 1914 silent film
- Threads of Destiny, a 1994 romance novel by Sara Wood
- Threads of Destiny, a 1998 romance novel by Arnette Lamb
- The Thread of Destiny, a 1910 film directed by D. W. Griffith
- Star Wars: Threads of Destiny, a 2014 Star Wars fan film
- Threads of destiny, mythical threads woven by goddesses of fate in Proto-Indo-European mythology
