= Signet Regency romances =

Signet Books was an imprint of the New American Library (NAL), which was established as an autonomous American publishing house after branching off from its British-based parent company, Penguin Books. Signet had the longest running Regency series, beginning in the late 1970s and ending in February 2006. It generally published three books each month, though this varied over the years. Signet also produced reissues, both of their own previous releases as well as those of other publishers.

Authors such as Mary Balogh, Catherine Coulter, and Amanda Scott began their careers writing for this line of books. Each title averaged around 220 pages, with longer romances being called Super Regency. From 1989 on an anthology of 4 novellas was published at special occasions throughout the year, including Christmas anthologies (1989–1998), Valentine anthologies (1996–2005), and Summer anthologies (1992–1995).

Other authors who wrote for the Signet Regency romance line include: Jo Beverley, Nancy Butler, Marjorie Farrell, Sandra Heath, Candice Hern, Carla Kelly, Allison Lane, Emma Lange, Anne MacNeill, Amanda McCabe, Dorothy McFalls, Melinda McRae, Barbara Metzger, Nadine Miller, Patricia Oliver, Andrea Pickens, Mary Jo Putney, Patricia Rice, Evelyn Richardson, Irene Saunders, and Joan Wolf.
