= Joan Wolf =

American writer of romance novels (born 1951)

- Born: 1951 (age 74–75); Bronx, New York, United States
- Occupation: Novelist
- Writing career
- Period: 1980–present
- Genre: Romance
- Website: www.joanwolf.com

Joan Wolf (born 1951 in Bronx, New York) is an American writer of romance novels.

Wolf grew up in the Bronx, New York. She obtained a full scholarship to pursue her bachelor's degree at Mercy College followed by a Master in English and Comparative Literature in Hunter College. Before she began her writing career, she taught at Cardinal Spellman High School in the Bronx.

== Bibliography ==
=== Single novels ===
- A Kind of Honor, 1980
- The Counterfeit Marriage, 1980
- A London Season, 1981
- A Difficult Truce, 1981
- The Scottish Lord, 1981
- His Lordship's Mistress, 1982
- Margarita, 1982
- The American Duchess, 1982
- A Double Deception, 1983
- Change of Heart, 1983
- Lord Richard's Daughter, 1983
- Summer Storm, 1983
- Affair of the Heart, 1984
- Beloved Stranger, 1984
- Fool's Masquerade, 1984
- Portrait of a Love, 1984
- The Rebellious Ward, 1984
- A Fashionable Affair, 1985
- Wild Irish Rose, 1985
- The Rebel and the Rose, 1986
- Highland Sunset, 1987
- The Deception, 1996
- The Arrangement, 1997
- The Guardian, 1997
- The Gamble, 1998
- Golden Girl, 1999
- The Pretenders, 1999
- Someday Soon, 2000
- Royal Bride, 2001
- Silverbridge, 2002
- High Meadow, 2003
- That Summer, 2003
- White Horses, 2004
- Crossword, 2004
- To The Castle, 2005
- A Dangerous Masquerade, 2006
- His Lordship's Desire, 2006

=== Biblical Romance series ===
1. A Reluctant Qeen: The Love Story of Esther, 2011
2. This Scarlet Cord: The Love Story of Rahab, 2012
3. Daughter of Jerusalem, 2013

=== Dark Ages of Britain series ===
1. The Road to Avalon, 1988
2. Born of the Sun, 1989
3. The Edge of Light, 1990

=== Prehistorical Romances series ===
1. Daughter of the Red Deer, 1991
2. The Horsemasters, 1993
3. The Reindeer Hunters, 1994

=== Medieval Mysteries series ===
1. No Dark Place, 1999
2. The Poisoned Serpent, 2000

=== Omnibus ===
- Beloved Stranger / Summer Storm, 1994

=== Anthologies in collaboration ===
- A Regency Valentine, 1991 (with Mary Balogh, Emma Lange, Patricia Rice, and Katherine Kingsley)
- Captured Hearts: Five favorite love stories, 1999 (with Mary Balogh, Edith Layton, Mary Jo Putney, and Patricia Rice)
- His Lordship's Mistress by Joan Wolf / Married by Mistake by Melinda McRae
