= Nicola Cornick =

British writer of historical romance novels

- Born: Bradford, Yorkshire, England
- Education: University of London
- Occupations: Novelist and historian
- Writing career
- Period: 1998–Present
- Genres: historical romance, time slip
- Website: www.nicolacornick.co.uk

Nicola Cornick (born 1964 in Bradford, Yorkshire, England) is a British writer of historical romance novels and time slip mysteries that merge multiple genres, including historical fiction, romance, suspense, adventure, crime, science fiction/fantasy and the supernatural. Her books have been translated into over 40 languages and she has won a number of awards.

Cornick was elected the twenty-eighth chair (2017–2019) of the Romantic Novelists' Association (RNA), and is a member of the Society of Authors and the Historical Writers' Association. She is a speaker on writing and history-related topics and is RNA archivist.

In 2018, Cornick described a literary phenomena she called the Tiffany Effect, a dilemma regarding names and terms in historical fiction.

== Biography ==
Nicola Cornick was born in Yorkshire, England. She obtained an honours degree in Medieval History from London University. She worked for many years in university administration, including at Cranfield University. She returned to college in Oxford, to study at Ruskin College. gaining a master's degree in Public History.

She published her first novel in 1998 for Mills & Boon (reedited as Harlequin Enterprises in USA), specialising in romances set in the British Regency. In 2006 she moved to HQN Books (Harlequin Enterprises) in the United States and published longer historical romances with settings ranging from 19th century Scotland to the Arctic. In 2014 she signed with HarperCollins HQ to write multiple time period historical mysteries.

Cornick's books have won the Reader's Choice Award, the Laurel Wreath and the LORIES.

She lives in Oxfordshire, England.

== Traditional Regencies ==
1. True Colours (1998)
2. The Virtuous Cyprian (1998)
3. The Larkswood Legacy (1999)
4. Lady Polly (1999)
5. Miss Verey's Proposal (2000)
6. Lady Allerton's Wager (2000)
7. The Notorious Marriage (2002)
8. The Earl's Prize (2002)
9. The Chaperon Bride (2003)
10. Wayward Widow (2003)
- The Blanchland Secret (2000)
- The Penniless Bride (2003)
- Lord Greville's Captive (2006)
- The Last Rake in London (2008)
- Kidnapped (2009)

=== Blue Stocking Brides Series ===
1. The Notorious Lord (2004)
2. One Night of Scandal (2004)
3. The Rake's Mistress (2004)

== Regency historicals ==
- Deceived (2006)
- Lord of Scandal (2007)
- Unmasked (2008)

=== The Brides of Fortune Series ===
1. The Secrets of a Courtesan (2009)
2. The Confessions of a Duchess (2009)
3. The Scandals of An Innocent (2009)
4. The Undoing of a Lady (2009)

=== Scandalous Women of the Ton Series ===
1. Whisper of Scandal (2010)
2. One Wicked Sin (2010)
3. Mistress by Midnight (2010)
4. Notorious (2011)
5. Desired (2011)
6. Forbidden (2012)

=== The Scottish Brides ===
1. The Lady and the Laird (2013)
2. One night with the Laird (2013)
3. Claimed by the Laird (2014)

=== Multi Period Historical ===
1. House of Shadows (2015)
2. The Phantom Tree (2016)
3. The Woman in the Lake (2019)
4. The Forgotten Sister (2020)
5. The Last Daughter (2021)

== Collaborations ==
=== Steepwood Scandal Series Multi-Author ===
4. A Companion of Quality (2001)
14. An Unlikely Suitor (2002)

=== Anthologies in collaboration ===
- "The Rake's Bride" in Regency Brides (2002) (with Anne Gracie and Gayle Wilson)
- "The Season for Suitors" in Christmas Keepsakes (2005) (with Mary Balogh and Julia Justiss)
- "The Fortune Hunter· in A Regency Invitation (2005) (with Joanna Maitland and Elizabeth Rolls)
- "The Pirate's Kiss" in Regency Christmas Weddings (2007) (with Miranda Jarrett and Margaret McPhee)
- "The Unmasking of Lady Loveless" in Together by Christmas (2009) (with Louise Allen and Catherine George)
- "The Elopement" in Love Me, Loves Me Not (2010) (with several authors)
- "On a Wicked Winter's Night in Mischief and Mistletoe (2012) (with several authors)
- "The Marriage Bargain in Truly, Madly, Deeply (2014) (with several authors)
- "A Season for Marriage in The Last Chance Christmas Ball (2014) (with several authors)
