= Barbara O'Neal =

American novelist

- Occupation: Novelist
- Writing career
- Pen name: Barbara Samuel, Lark O'Neal, Ruth Wind
- Period: 1990–present
- Genres: women's fiction, new adult romance, contemporary romance, historical romance
- Website: www.barbaraoneal.com

Barbara O'Neal is an American novelist who has written over forty books under different pen names.

O'Neal's books include When We Believed in Mermaids, The Starfish Sisters, The Lost Recipe for Happiness and How to Bake a Perfect Life.

O'Neal has written women's fiction under the names Barbara O’Neal and Barbara Samuel, contemporary and historical romance novels under Barbara Samuel and Ruth Wind, and new adult romances under Lark O’Neal.

== Career ==
Since 2017, Barbara O'Neal has written general fiction for Lake Union Publishing, and has since published 8 titles with them. Her book, When We Believed in Mermaids, was published in 2019. It has sold more than 1 million copies and been published in over 21 territories.

In 2000, O'Neal began writing women's fiction under the name Barbara Samuel, publishing five books under this name until moving her women's fiction titles under the name Barbara O’Neal. Her novels often revolve around multi-generational stories about women, and include themes of food, second chances, and families. She has won three RITA awards for her women's fiction work, making her eligible for the Romance Writers of America Hall of Fame, into which she was inducted in 2012. All of these titles have been reissued by Lake Union books.

O'Neal began her writing career as an author for Harlequin Silhouette. Writing as Ruth Wind, she has published over twenty contemporary romances, winning two RITA awards in this genre. Under the name Barbara Samuel, she has written seven historical romances, winning a RITA in 1998 for her book, Heart of a Knight.

O'Neal has won the RITA award seven times and been nominated for seven others. Her books have also won two Colorado Book Awards, and been named Favorite Book of the Year from Romance Writers of America, a Target Book Club pick, and a top book from Library Journal.

When New Adult Romance emerged as a new genre 2013, O'Neal began writing as Lark O’Neal, launching her first New Adult series, Going the Distance, later that year.

== Bibliography ==
=== Women's Fiction ===
==== Published as Barbara O'Neal ====
- The Last Letter of Rachel Ellsworth. Lake Union, July 2025. ISBN 978-1662514951
- Memories of the Lost. Lake Union, July 2024. ISBN 978-1662514913
- The Starfish Sisters. Lake Union, September 2023. ISBN 978-1542038089
- This Place of Wonder. Lake Union, July 2022. ISBN 978-1542037983
- Write My Name Across the Sky. Lake Union. August 2021. ISBN 978-1542021647
- The Lost Girls of Devon. Lake Union. July 2020. ISBN 978-1542020725
- When We Believed in Mermaids. Lake Union. July 2019. ISBN 9781542004527
- The Art of Inheriting Secrets. Lake Union. July 2018. ISBN 978-1503901391
- The All You Can Dream Buffet. Bantam. March 2014. ISBN 978-0345536860.
- The Garden of Happy Endings. Bantam. April 2012. ISBN 978-0-345-53446-0.
- How to Bake a Perfect Life. Bantam. December 2010. ISBN 978-0-553-38677-6.
- The Secret of Everything. Bantam. December 2009. ISBN 978-0-553-38552-6.
- The Lost Recipe for Happiness. Bantam. December 2008. ISBN 978-0-553-38551-9.

==== Published as Barbara Samuel ====
- The Scent of Hours (originally published as Madame Mirabou's School of Love). Ballantine. March 2006. ISBN 9780345469144.
- Lady Luck's Map of Vegas. Ballantine. January 2005. ISBN 9780451229021.
- The Goddesses of Kitchen Avenue. Ballantine. February 2004. ISBN 9780345445698.
- A Piece of Heaven. Ballantine. February 2003. ISBN 9780345445674.
- No Place Like Home. Ballantine. February 2003. ISBN 9780451229021.

==== Published as Ruth Wind ====
- In the Midnight Rain. HarperCollins. May 2000. ISBN 9780061030123.

=== New Adult Romance ===
==== Published as Lark O'Neal ====
- Random. November 2013.
- Stoked. February 2014.
- Epic. August 2014.
- Brilliant. December 2014.
- Intense. May 2015.
- Extreme. December 2015.

=== Contemporary Romance ===
==== Published as Ruth Wind ====
- Miranda's Revenge. Silhouette. September 2007. ISBN 9780373275496.
- Desi's Rescue. Silhouette. April 2007, ISBN 9780451229021.
- Juliet's Law. Silhouette. October 2006. ISBN 9780373275052.
- The Diamond Secret. Silhouette. January 2010. ISBN 9780733569258.
- Countdown. Silhouette. April 2005. ISBN 9780373513529.
- Born Brave. Silhouette. October 2001. ISBN 9780373271764.
- Beautiful Stranger. Silhouette. June 2000. ISBN 9780451229021.
- Rio Grande Wedding. Silhouette. November 1999. ISBN 9780373079643.
- For Christmas Forever. Silhouette. December 1998. ISBN 9780373078981.
- Meant to be Married. Silhouette. August 1998. ISBN 9780373241941.
- Her Ideal Man. Silhouette. August 1997. ISBN 9780373078011.
- Reckless. Silhouette. July 1997. ISBN 9780373077960.
- Marriage Material. Silhouette. June 1997. ISBN 9780373241088.
- Rainsinger. Silhouette. May 1996. ISBN 9780373240319.
- The Last Chance Ranch. Silhouette. August 1995. ISBN 9780373099771.
- Breaking the Rules. Silhouette. August 1994. ISBN 9780451229021.
- Walk in Beauty. Silhouette. April 1994. ISBN 9780373098811.
- Jezebel's Blues. Silhouette. December 1992. ISBN 9780373097852.
- A Minute to Smile. Silhouette. May 1992. ISBN 9780373097425.
- Light of Day. Silhouette. November 1990. ISBN 9780373096350.
- Summer's Freedom. Silhouette. March 1990. ISBN 9780373095889.
- Strangers On a Train. Silhouette. October 1988. ISBN 9780373095551.

=== Historical Romance ===
==== Published as Barbara Samuel ====
- Night of Fire. Avon. December 2000. ISBN 9780061013911.
- The Black Angel. HarperCollins. October 1999. ISBN 9780061013898.
- Heart of a Knight. HarperCollins. August 1997. ISBN 9780061085185.
- Dancing Moon. HarperCollins. September 1996. ISBN 9780061083631.
- Lucien's Fall. HarperCollins. September 1995. ISBN 9780061083624.
- A Winter Ballad. HarperCollins. November 1994. ISBN 9780061080791.
- A Bed of Spices. HarperCollins. September 1993. ISBN 9780061080784.

=== Nonfiction ===
==== Published as Barbara Samuel ====
- "The Art of Romance Novels'" essay in North American Romance Writers (1999, ISBN 0810836041)
- The Care and Feeding of The Girls in the Basement: An Upbeat Guide to Life as a Writer. eBook.
- The Girls in the Basement: Celebration Book, A Writer's Guide to Joy. eBook.

=== Omnibus ===
- Seal of My Dreams. Belle Bridge Books. November 2011. ISBN 9781611940510.
- Chalice of Roses. NAL. January 2010. ISBN 9780451229021. (with Jo Beverley, Mary Jo Putney, Karen Harbaugh)
- A Mother's Love. Harlequin. April 2008. ISBN 9780451229021. (with Janice Kay Johnson, Raeanne Thayne)
- Dragon Lovers. NAL. March 2007. ISBN 9780451229021. (with Jo Beverley, Mary Jo Putney, Karen Harbaugh)
- Lakota Legacy. Harlequin. October 2003. ISBN 9780373218103. (with Madeline Baker, Kathleen Eagle)
- Faery Magic. Kensington. 1998. ISBN 9780821758175. (with Jo Beverley, Mary Jo Putney, Karen Harbaugh)
- Irish Magic II. Kensington. June 2009 (re-release). ISBN 9781420106626. (with Susan Wiggs, Morgan Llywelyn, Roberta Gellis)
- Irish Magic. Kensington. February 1996, ISBN 9781575660028. (with Susan Wiggs, Morgan Llywelyn, Roberta Gellis)

== Awards ==
- 1998 RITA Award for Best Short Historical for Heart of a Knight (written as Barbara Samuel)
- 1998 RITA Award for Best Long Contemporary Series Romance for Reckless (written as Ruth Wind)
- 1999 RITA Award for Best Long Contemporary Romance for Meant to be Married (written as Ruth Wind)
- 2003 RITA Award for Best Contemporary Single Title for No Place Like Home (written as Barbara Samuel)
- 2006 RITA Award for Best Novel with Strong Romantic Elements for Lady Luck's Map of Vegas (written as Barbara Samuel)
- 2010 RITA Award for Best Novel with Strong Romantic Elements for The Lost Recipe for Happiness
- 2012 RITA Award for Best Novel with Strong Romantic Elements for How to Bake a Perfect Life
- 2012 ROMANCE WRITERS HALL OF FAME for Strong Romantic Elements
