= Mary Jo Putney =

American romance author

- Born: 1946 (age 79–80); Batavia, New York, United States
- Education: Syracuse University
- Occupation: Novelist
- Writing career
- Pen name: Mary Jo Putney, M.J. Putney
- Period: 1987-present
- Genres: Romance, Fantasy
- Website: www.maryjoputney.com

Mary Jo Putney (born in New York) is an American author of over twenty-five historical and contemporary romance novels. She has also published romantic fantasy novels as M.J. Putney. Her books are known for their unusual subject matter, including alcoholism, death, and domestic abuse.

== Biography ==
Putney was born was born in 1946 in Batavia, New York and raised in New York. She attended Syracuse University, earning degrees in English literature and Industrial design. She served as the art editor of The New Internationalist magazine in London and worked as a designer in California before settling in Baltimore, Maryland in 1980 to run her own freelance graphic design business.

After purchasing her first computer for her business, Putney realized that it would make writing very easy. She began work on her first novel, a traditional Regency romance, which sold in one week. Signet liked the novel so much that it offered Putney a three-book contract immediately. In 1987 that first novel, The Diabolical Baron, was published. Since then, she has published twenty-nine books (as of January 2007). Her books have been ranked on the national bestseller lists of the New York Times, USAToday, and Publishers Weekly. The vast majority of her works have been historical romance, although she did write three contemporary romances. She has also begun writing fantasy romance and romantic fantasy as M.J. Putney.

According to IUP (Indiana University of Pennsylvania) Magazine, Mary Jo Putney wed John Rekus (IUP alumni 1990), a consulting engineer, on April 14, 2012 at the castle at Maryvale. They reside at their estate in Ruxton, Maryland along with their four cats.

== Bibliography ==
=== As M.J. Putney ===
==== Dark Mirror ====
- Dark Mirror (2011)
- Dark Passage (2011)
- Dark Destiny (2012)

=== As Mary Jo Putney ===
==== Single novels ====
- Lady of Fortune (1988)
- Uncommon Vows (1991)
- Carousel of Hearts (1992)
- Dearly Beloved (1990)
- The Bargain (1999) (revised from The Would-be Widow (1988))

==== Davenport Series ====
1. The Diabolical Baron (1987)
2. The Rake (1998) (revised from The Rake and the Reformer (1989))
3. "Sunshine for Christmas" in A Regency Christmas II (1990)

==== Bride Trilogy ====
1. The Wild Child (1998)
2. The China Bride (2000)
3. The Bartered Bride (2002)

==== Silk Trilogy ====
1. Silk and Shadows (1991)
2. Silk and Secrets (1992)
3. Veils of Silk (1992)
4. Christmas Silks (2024)

==== Fallen Angels Series ====
1. Thunder and Roses (1993) (reissued in Great Britain as Fallen Angel (2009))
2. Petals in the Storm (1993) (revised from The Controversial Countess (1989))
3. Dancing on the Wind (1994)
4. Angel Rogue (1995) (revised from The Rogue and the Runaway (1990))
5. Shattered Rainbows (1996)
6. River of Fire (1996)
7. One Perfect Rose (1997)

==== Circle of Friends Series ====
1. The Burning Point (2000)
2. The Spiral Path (2002)
3. "A Holiday Fling" in Christmas Revels (2002)
4. Twist of Fate (2003)

==== Guardian Series ====
1. "The Alchemical Marriage" in Irresistible Forces (2004)
2. A Kiss of Fate (2004)
3. Stolen Magic (2005) (as M.J. Putney)
4. A Distant Magic (2006)
5. "The Tuesday Enchantress" in The Mammoth Book of Paranormal Romance (2009)
6. "The White Rose of Scotland" in Chalice of Roses (2010) reissued as Unseen Magic (2024)
7. "The Demon Dancer" in Songs of Love and Death (2010)

==== Stone Saint Series ====
1. The Marriage Spell (2006)

==== Lost Lords Series ====
1. Loving a Lost Lord (2009)
2. Never Less than a Lady (2010)
3. Nowhere Near Respectable (2011)
4. No Longer a Gentleman (2012)
5. Sometimes a Rogue (2013)
6. Not Quite A Wife (2014)
7. Not Always A Saint (2015)

==== Rogues Redeemed Series ====
1. Once a Soldier (2016)
2. Once a Rebel (2017)
3. Once a Scoundrel (2018)
4. Once a Spy (2019)
5. Once Dishonored (2020)
6. Once a Laird (2021)

==== Dangerous Gifts ====
1. Silver Lady (2023)
2. Golden Lord (2024)

==== Collections ====
- Christmas Revels (2002) includes 5 novellas: Sunshine for Christmas, The Christmas Cuckoo, The Christmas Tart, The Black Beast of Belleterre, and A Holiday Fling
- Dangerous to Know (2007) includes the novel The Diabolical Baron (1987) and the novella Mad, Bad, and Dangerous to Know
- Christmas Mischief (2010) includes 3 novellas: Sunshine for Christmas, The Christmas Cuckoo, and The Christmas Tart

==== Omnibus in Collaboration ====
- "The Christmas Cuckoo" in A Regency Christmas (1991) (with Mary Balogh, Sandra Heath, Melinda McRae and Edith Layton)
- "The Christmas Tart" in A Regency Christmas IV (1992) (with Mary Balogh, Marjorie Farrell, Sandra Heath and Emma Lange)
- "The Black Beast of Belleterre" in A Victorian Christmas (1992)(with Edith Layton, Betina Krahn, Patricia Gaffney and Patricia Rice) reissued in Christmas Roses (2013)
- "Mad, Bad and Dangerous to Know" in Rakes and Rogues (1993) (with Mary Balogh, Melinda McRae, Anita Mills and Maura Seger) reissued in Captured Hearts (1999) (with Mary Balogh, Edith Layton, Patricia Rice and Joan Wolf)
- "The Wedding of the Century" in Promised Brides (1994) (with Kristin James and Julie Tetel) reissued in Bride by Arrangement (2000) (with Merline Lovelace and Gayle Wilson)
- "The Devil's Spawn" in Dashing and Dangerous (1995) (with Mary Balogh, Edith Layton, Melinda McRae and Anita Mills)
- "Goldspun Promises" / "No Brighter Dream" / "Dancing on the Wind" (1995) (with Elizabeth Gregg and Katherine Kingsley)
- "Dangerous Gifts" in Faery Magic (1996) (with Jo Beverley, Karen Harbaugh and Barbara Samuel) reissued as Beware Faery Gifts (2025)
- "The Best Husband Money Can Buy" in Stocking Full of Joy (1997) (with Jill Barnett, Justine Dare, Susan King)
- "Avalon" in In Our Dreams (1998) (with Ruth Glick, Barbara Cummings, Courtney Henke, and Corey McFadden)
- "The Stargazer's Familiar" in A Constellation of Cats (2002) (with Andre Norton, Elizabeth Ann Scarborough, Jody Lynn Nye, Kristine Kathryn Rusch, Mickey Zucker Reichert, and others) reissued in The Journey Home (2005)(with Catherine Asaro, Diane Chamberlain, Mallory Kane, Mary Kirk, Candice Kohl, Lucy Grijalva, Linda Madl, Patricia Rice, CB Scott, and Rebecca York)
- "A Dragon's Tale" in Bewitched, Bothered and BeVampyred (2005) (with Gena Showalter, Mary Janice Davidson, Alesia Holliday, Susan Grant, Patricia Rice and Vicki Lewis Thompson)
- "The Dragon and the Dark Knight" in Dragon Lovers (2007) (with Jo Beverley, Karen Harbaugh and Barbara Samuel)
- "She Stoops to Wenchdom" in Mischief and Mistletoe (2012) (with Jo Beverley, Joanna Bourne, Patricia Rice, Nicola Cornick, Cara Elliott, Anne Gracie, and Susan King)
- "One Wicked Winter Night" in Seduction on a Snowy Night (2019) (with Madeline Hunter and Sabrina Jeffries)

=== Non-fiction ===
- "Welcome to the Dark Side" essay in Dangerous Men and Adventurous Women: Romance Writers on the Appeal of the Romance (1992, ISBN 0-8122-3192-9, 0-8122-1411-0)
- "The Writer’s Journey: Like a Lemming over a Cliff" essay in North American Romance Writers (1999, ISBN 0810836041)

== Awards and reception ==
- 2014 - Library Journal Top Ten Best Romances of 2014 – Not Quite a Wife

Putney has also won the Romance Writers of America RITA Award twice, for Dancing on the Wind and The Rake and the Reformer and has been a RITA finalist nine times. She is on the Romance Writers of America Honor Roll for bestselling authors, and has been awarded two Romantic Times Career Achievement Awards and four Golden Leaf Awards.
