= Clare Darcy =

American novelist

Clare Darcy was the pseudonym used by the American novelist Mary Deasy (1914–1978) for her Regency Romance novels, i.e., novels set in Regency England. She was born on May 20, 1914, in Cincinnati, Ohio, and died in Ohio in May 1978. A number of the manuscripts of her Regency novels (as well as of her other works), along with notebooks, scrapbooks, photographs, correspondence, book reviews, etc., are in the collection of the Howard Gottlieb Archival Research Center at Boston University, whose website (see link below) provides further information about the Deasy/Darcy collection.

== Works published under the pseudonym Clare Darcy ==
- Georgina (1971)
- Cecily: Or a Young Lady of Quality (1972)
- Lydia: Or Love in Town
- Victoire (1974)
- Lady Pamela (1975)
- Allegra (1976)
- Elyza (1976)
- Regina (1976)
- Cressida (1977)
- Eugenia (1977)
- Gwendolen (1978)
- Rolande (1978)
- Letty (1980)
- Caroline and Julia (1982)

== External links and references ==
- Howard Gottlieb Archival Research Center - Mary Deasy (Clare Darcy)
- fantastic fiction - Clare Darcy
- book crossing - Clare Darcy
