= A Kingdom of Dreams =

1989 novel by Judith McNaught

- First paperback edition cover
- Author: Judith McNaught
- Language: English
- Series: Westmoreland series
- Genre: Historical, romance
- Publisher: Pocket Books
- Publication date: 1 March 1989
- Publication place: United States
- Media type: Print (hardback & paperback)
- ISBN: 0-671-63780-0 First edition, hardback
- OCLC: 19342529
- Followed by: Whitney My Love

A Kingdom of Dreams is a 1989 New York Times bestselling historical romance novel written by American author Judith McNaught. It is set during the early 16th century.

== Plot summary ==
Jennifer Merrick is the feisty daughter of a Scottish laird. Royce Westmoreland, the "Black Wolf", is sent by the King of England to wage war against Scotland. When Royce's brother, Stefan Westmoreland, kidnaps Jennifer and her stepsister, Brenna, and brings them to Royce's camp, the lives of the two become intertwined. Royce and Jennifer must marry by order of the King of England and the King of Scotland after they consummate their keeper-prisoner relationship.

Forced to accept the marriage, Jennifer's family try to make the marriage fail by intending to send her to become a nun in a convent after the wedding reception. Royce beats the family plan by kidnapping her first and takes her to his home. The King of England orders the two families to settle their score in a tournament where Jennifer must choose which family her loyalty lies with.

== Reception and legacy ==
Romantic Times gave A Kingdom of Dreams a favorable review and a five-star rating. Library Journal noted that the book is "filled with McNaught's trademark mix of lush romance and horrible conflict", and that the Westmoreland family was iconic in the genre, with significant impact on Romance fandom.

NYT bestselling Romance authors Tanya Anne Crosby and Sarah MacLean are both fans of the work. Crosby credits it for inspiring her to write her first published book, Angel of Fire. When MacLean writes a new book, she rereads all of McNaught's works, ending with A Kingdom of Dreams: "Here’s why – I am a sucker for the black moment. I adore the moment when the hero and heroine are both broken in their own way, and they – and the reader – can’t imagine how this love story will ever work out.

A Kingdom of Dreams features prominently in Sex and the Genre: The Role of Sex in Popular Romance by Codruţa Goşa of the West University of Timișoara, where the novel's five sex scenes are compared with those of Nora Roberts’s Enchanted and Sandra Brown’s Fanta C (the three being selected as examples of works of bestselling Romance authors in Romania).

In a 2006 prank interview on WFMU's The Best Show with Tom Scharpling, American musician Marky Ramone appeared to credit the book as sparking his interest in the historical romance genre, which led him to write a romance novel of his own, Lady Wainsworth's Desires.

The book has been rereleased numerous times, and translated into more than ten foreign languages.

== Westmoreland Dynasty Saga ==
1. A Kingdom of Dreams (1989)
2. Whitney, My Love (1985)
3. Until You (1994)
4. Miracles novella (1995)
