= Regency romance =

Subgenre of romance novels

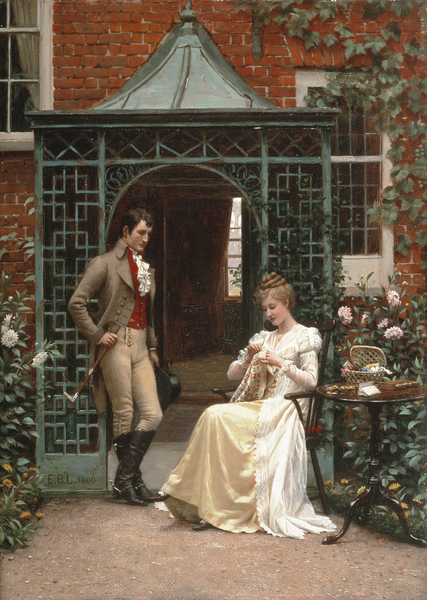
On the Threshold (1900), by Edmund Leighton, a painting set in the Regency era.

Regency romances are a subgenre of romance novels set during the period of the British Regency (1811–1820) or the early 19th century. Rather than simply being versions of contemporary romance stories transported to a historical setting, Regency romances are a distinct genre with their plot and stylistic conventions. These derive not so much from the 19th-century contemporary works of Jane Austen, but rather from Georgette Heyer, who wrote over two dozen novels set in the Regency starting in 1935 until she died in 1974, and from the fiction genre known as the novel of manners. In particular, the more traditional Regencies feature a great deal of intelligent, fast-paced dialogue between the protagonists and very little explicit sex or discussion of sex.

== Subgenres ==
Many readers and writers of Regency romance make a distinction between "Traditional Regency Romance" and "Regency Historical". Many authors have started by writing Traditionals and subsequently written Historicals, including Mary Balogh, Jo Beverley, Loretta Chase, and Mary Jo Putney.

=== Traditional Regency romance ===
The distinction rests on the genre definition of Regency Romance: works in the tradition of Georgette Heyer, with an emphasis on the primary romance plot, are considered traditional. Traditional Regency Romance writers usually pay close attention to historical detail, as their readers are notorious for noting errors, and the writers often do extensive research so they can clearly understand and replicate the voice of the genre. After Heyer's novels became popular in the United States in the 1960s, many publishers began publishing other Regency-set books by new authors, including Clare Darcy and Elizabeth Mansfield. Signet, Dell, and Fawcett were among those publishing Traditional Regencies in paperback; the latter eventually began a special imprint, Fawcett Coventry, which published Regencies and romances from other historical periods.

=== Regency historical romance ===
The Regency-set books written by authors such as Christina Dodd, Eloisa James, and Amanda Quick are generally considered to be Regency Historical works. Regency romances which may include more social realism, or, conversely, anachronistically modern characterization, might be classed by some as "Regency Historical", signifying that their general setting is in Regency England, but the plot, characterization, or prose style of the work extends beyond the genre formula of the Regency romances published by Heyer and her successors. Characters may behave according to modern values, rather than Regency values.

The sensual Regency historical romance has been made popular in recent years by Mary Balogh, Jo Beverley, Loretta Chase, as well as Lisa Kleypas, and Stephanie Laurens. These novels are much more explicit than the "Traditional Regency" works and include many more love scenes.

== Common elements ==
Many Regency romance novels include the following:

- References to the ton (le bon ton)
- Depictions of social activities common during the social season such as carriage rides, morning calls, dinner parties, routs, plays, operas, assemblies, balls, etc.
- References to, or descriptions of, athletic activities engaged in by fashionable young men of the period, including riding, driving, boxing, fencing, hunting, shooting, etc.
- Differences in social class
- Marriages of convenience: a marriage based on love was rarely an option for most women in the British Regency, as securing a steady and sufficient income was the first consideration for both the woman and her family.
- False engagements
- Cyprians (sex workers), demireps (women of ill repute), mistresses and other women employed by rakehell and men from the upper classes
- Mistaken identity, deliberate or otherwise
- Mystery or farce elements in the plot
- The rank system of the peerage of England plays a large role in the "marriage mart" of Regency Romance. Observers have noted a historically inaccurate and statistically unlikely overabundance of Dukes in the genre.
1. Duke
2. Marquess
3. Earl
4. Viscount
5. Baron

== Popularity of the genre ==
Like other fiction genres and subgenres, Regencies experience cyclic popularity swings.

The readership waned during the 1990s with the rise of historical romances (and the switch of many Regency writers to the historical genre). In the early 2000s, both Regencies and other historical romances lost popularity in favor of contemporary settings. The market in the United States was hurt by changes in distributing and retailing romances. The last two major U.S. publishers to produce the shorter "traditional" Regencies regularly were Zebra and Signet. This ended in 2005 when Zebra stopped their traditional Regency line, and in early 2006, when Signet ended its Regencies. There are some new "traditional" Regencies still published in the United States; some of the few publishers that still do so are Avalon Books, Five Star Books, and Cerridwen Press (Cotillion). Previously published Regencies are also available through the second-hand book market, via Belgrave House (which publishes out-of-print books), and as e-book reprints.

The Regency subgenre changed somewhat during the 1990s and 2000s, when authors began incorporating more sex into their novels, under pressure from a changing reader base. While some long-time readers balked, publishers viewed the inclusion of sex scenes as a means of keeping the subgenre afloat. The goal was to appeal to a new generation of readers while still delivering the witty and clever plotlines loyal readers love. Regency romance authors such as Sandra Heath, Anita Mills, and Mary Balogh were the first to write about sexual relationships between the hero and heroine (or more rarely, between the hero and his mistress).

Not all Regency romance novels are frothy period pieces. Such authors as Balogh, Carla Kelly, Sheila Bishop, Anna Harrington, and Mary Jo Putney all depict the underbelly of Regency society, exploring a variety of social ills in their novels. Some authors feature seriously troubled heroes and heroines, who suffer from post-battle trauma, alcoholism, depression, and the like.

== Sources ==
- Jennifer Kloester, Georgette Heyer’s Regency World (2011)
