= Arnette Lamb =

American novelist

- Born: January 12, 1947; Boston, Massachusetts, United States
- Died: September 18, 1998 (aged 51); United States
- Occupation: Novelist
- Writing career
- Period: 1995–1998
- Genre: Romance

Arnette Lamb (January 12, 1947 – September 18, 1998) was an American author of romance novels.

== Bibliography ==
=== MacKenzie Series ===
1. Threads of Destiny 1990/Jul
2. Highland Rogue 1991/Jul
3. Betrayed 1995/Nov
4. Beguiled 1996/Jun
5. True Heart 1997/Jan

=== Single novels ===
- The Betrothal 1992/Jun
- His Flame 1998/Dec

=== Border Series ===
1. Border Lord 1993/Fec
2. Border Bride 1993/Sep
3. Chieftain 1994/Apr
4. Maiden of Inverness 1995/Mar

=== Anthologies in collaboration ===
- "Flowers from the Sea" in Cherished Moments (with Rosanne Bittner and Anita Mills) 1994,05
- "Hark! The Herald" in A Holiday of Love (with Jill Barnett, Jude Deveraux and Judith McNaught) 1994,11

== Reference and sources ==
- Arnette Lamb in Fantastic Fiction

== See also ==
- List of romantic novelists
