= Whitney, My Love =

1985 book by Judith McNaught

- First edition
- Author: Judith McNaught
- Language: English
- Genre: Romance
- Published: 1985, Pocket Books, Simon & Schuster, Inc.
- Publication place: United States
- ISBN: 978-0-671-77609-1

Whitney, My Love is the first book published by author Judith McNaught. While written first, it is the second novel in the Westmoreland Dynasty Saga, preceded by A Kingdom of Dreams (1989) and followed by Until You (1994) and "Miracles" (1995/7).

The novel was originally published in 1985 by Pocket Books, a branch of Simon & Schuster, Inc.

== Synopsis ==
=== Plot ===
After a young Whitney Stone's mother dies, her father Martin is unable to handle her tomboyish antics and sends Whitney off to France with her aunt and uncle, Lady Anne and Lord Edward Gilbert, a diplomat. Whitney is separated from her childhood love, a significantly older Paul Sevarin, who does not return her affections. Before leaving, she vows to come home from France and marry Paul. While in France, she is educated by a variety of language, dance, and etiquette tutors, coming to age as a fashionable and witty young lady. She also meets the DuVille family, becoming close friends with the daughter Therèse and their son Nicolas (Nicki). Around the age of 19, Whitney attends a party in France where she meets a mysterious stranger. Shortly after, she is recalled to England by her father. To the surprise of her small town, Whitney returns as a sophisticated young lady. Furthermore, possessing what she believes is a substantial inheritance from her grandmother, Whitney is determined to marry Paul.

Once home, Martin hosts a party for Whitney to reintroduce her to the town and their new neighbor, a Mr. Clayton Westland. Whitney is disinterested, focusing her attention on Paul. She and Paul have a flirtation, which Whitney believes leads to a serious courtship, despite her father's efforts to push her towards Mr. Westland. When Paul proposes, Whitney eagerly tells her father, only for him to reveal that he had spent her dowry and sold her in marriage to the Duke of Claymore in exchange for a large sum of money to save the family home from ruin. Martin also reveals that Mr. Westland is the Duke of Claymore and slaps Whitney, much to Clayton's displeasure. Whitney begs Clayton to keep the engagement a secret and he acquiesces on the condition that she break off the engagement with Paul. Convinced they can run away and pay back the dowry money her father spent, Whitney reveals the situation to Paul. Instead, Paul is angry as he had already started spending her dowry money. Resigned, Whitney accepts her status

Clayton and Whitney begin a tentative courtship, filled with passion. The beginning of the relationship is tumultuous, with the apex being a controversial rape scene.

Whitney and Clayton become estranged due to miscommunication. Whitney's cousin Emily, aware of the entire story, contrives to bring Whitney and Clayton back together at Elizabeth's wedding. While this initially does not work, Whitney and Clayton ultimately reunite and become happy parents.

== Main characters ==
Characters from the Westmoreland Dynasty Saga universe appear across the novels. From this era, Whitney, Clayton, and Stephen appear in Until You, with Clayton and Stephen's ancestor, Royce Westmoreland, as the main character in A Kingdom of Dreams.

- Whitney Stone
- Clayton Westmoreland, Duke of Claymore
- Paul Sevarin, Whitney's girlhood crush
- Nicolas DuVille, Whitney's friend and suitor
- Martin Stone, father of Whitney
- Anne Gilbert, Whitney's aunt
- Edward Gilbert, Whitney's uncle
- Emily Williams, Whitney's cousin
- Elizabeth Ashton, Whitney's childhood acquaintance and adulthood friend
- Peter Redfern, Elizabeth's husband
- Stephen Westmoreland, brother of Clayton (main character in Until You)

== Style and themes ==
Eloisa James, romance novelist and professor, cites Whitney, My Love as introducing her to the works of McNaught. James calls her a "brilliant tutor" in the craft of romance, especially through suspending reality and creating romantic relationships in her novels.

Utilizing the genre of romance, McNaught is able to create a link between the reader and the heroine. Through this connection, readers feel as if they are the ones receiving the attention and desire from the male hero. Furthermore, the codes and language within the romance novel genre, create a community of female readers sharing in similar emotions and knowledge.

== Release history ==
After the initial publication in 1985, Whitney, My Love was adapted by a number of publishers to at least 6 different languages and four formats. Languages include English, French, Russian, Brazilian Portuguese, Hungarian, Spanish, and Italian. The book was published as a hardback, paperback, large print book, and eBook. Most notably, the 1999/2000 edition and republication resulted in a 180-page addition to the original story, changing at least two scenes and extending the final ending.

Country	Release date	Edition (Hardback/Paperback)	Publisher	ISBN/OCLC	Pages	Notes
United States	1985		Pocket Books			
United States	January 1985	Paperback	Pocket Books	9780671528089 9780671671389 9780671737641	538	
United States	1985	Print	Simon & Schuster, Inc.	9780671737641 9780671032975	538	
United States	1985	Large Print	Simon & Schuster, Inc.	9781568951072	711	
England	1985	Print	Severn House	466211289	538	
England	1985	Paperback	Corgi	828595252	N/A	
United States	March 1987			9780552127288	544	
England	1987	Print and Large Print	Corgi	9780552127288	538	
United States	1989	Print	Severn House	9780727816948	538	Distributed by Mercedes Distribution Center, Inc.
United Kingdom	1989	Print	Severn House	19584179	538	
United States	1989	Large Print	Severn House	693584962	538	
United States	1994	Large Print	Pocket Books	9780739405499	1038	
United States	1994	Large Print	Wheeler Publishing	9781568951072	711	
France	1994	Print	J'ai Lu	9782277237419	414	Translated by Elisabeth Luc
France	1994	Print	J'ai Lu	9782290008010	414	
United States	1998	Print	Pocket Books	9780671776091	708	
Russia	1998	Print	ACT	9785150009059	608	Translated by Dzhudit Maknot; and T.A. Pert︠s︡evoĭ
Russia	1999	Print	ACT	9785237003161 9785237003178	N/A	Translated by Dzhudit Maknot; In two volumes
United States	1999	Print	Pocket Books	9780671032975	577	
United States	1999	Print	Simon & Schuster, Inc.	9780671776091	708	
United States	1999	Print	Pocket Books	9780671036850 9780671032975 9780671776091	577	Special collector's edition; New ending
United States	1999	Large Print	Pocket Books	9780739405499	1038	
Brazil	1999	Print	São Paulo: Best Seller	9788571236530	480	Translated by Vera Maria Marques Martins
United States	2000	Print	Pocket Books	9780671776091	708	
United States	2000	eBook	Pocket Books	9781501145438	708	Adaptation of the 1999 reprint
United States	2000	Large Print	Pocket Books	9780671776091	708	
United States	2001	Print	Doubleday	9780739405499	577	
Hungary	2002	Print	Magyar Könyvklub	9789635475759	539	Translated by Tamásné Vitray
Spain	2005	Print	Barcelona: Cisne DeBolsillo	788497935166	729	Translated by Margarita Cavándoli; 3 editions of this version published
United States	2006	Print	Pocket Books	9781416530718	708	Special edition with alternative ending
Russia	2006	Print	ACT	9785170324330 9785170324316	N/A	Translated by Джудит Макнот; In two volumes
Russia	2006	Print	ACT	9785170272891 9785971326038 9785170278947 9785971326052	557	Translated by Т.А. Перцевой
France	2008	Print	J'ai Lu	9782290008010	414	
United States	2008	Print	Pocket Books	9780671036850	N/A	
Hungary	2009	Print	Budapest: General Press	909773400	516	
Spain	2010	Print	Random House Mondadori	805054446	729	
Spain	2012	Print	Barcelona: Cisne	9788499894164	729	
Italy	2014	Print	Mondadori	956550376	349	
Russia	2014	Print	ACT	9785170859856	542	
Russia	2017	Print	ACT	9785171044794	542	
