= Susan Holloway Scott =

American author of historical fiction

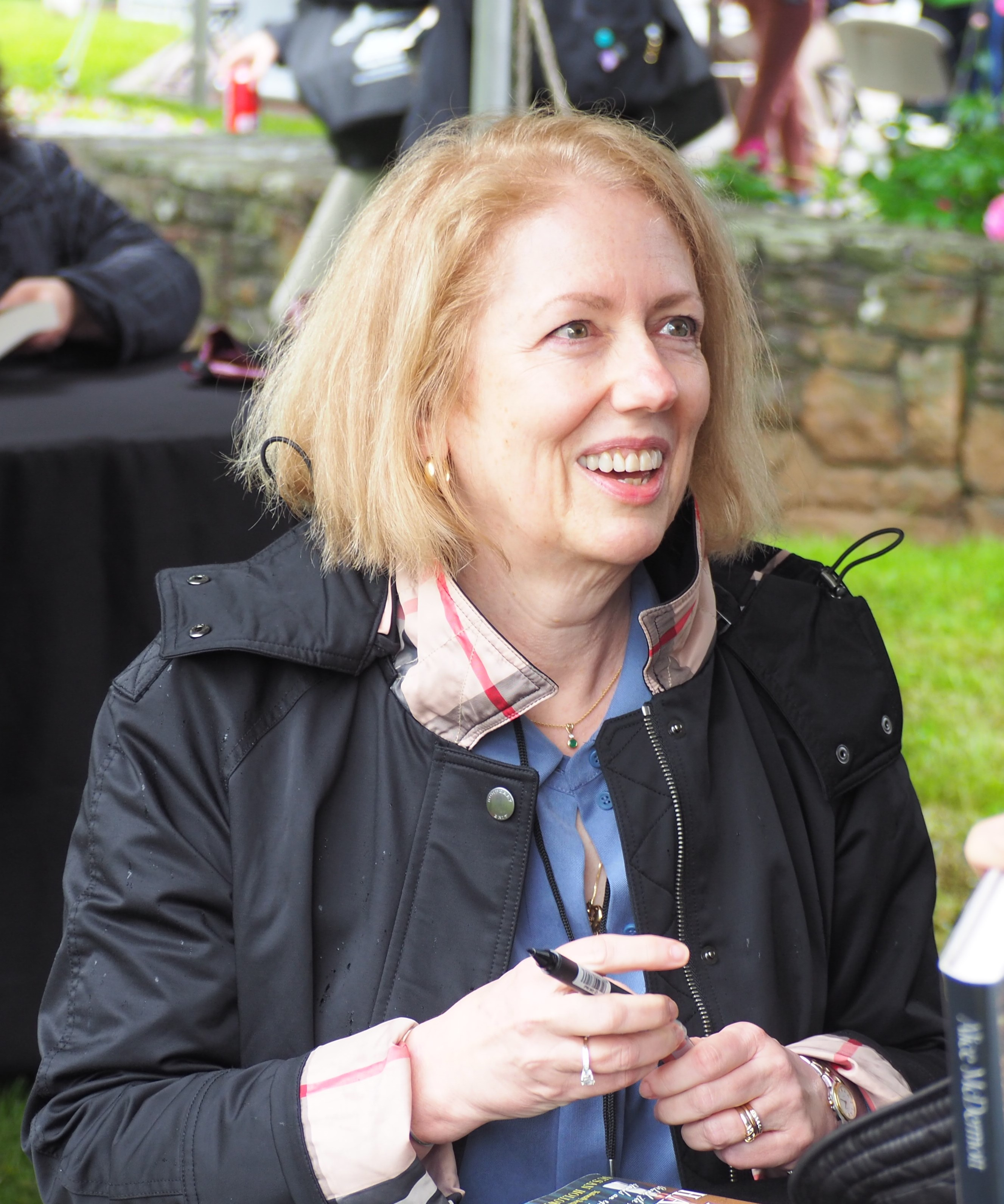
- Born: Washington, D.C., U.S.
- Education: Brown University (BA)
- Occupation: Novelist
- Writing career
- Pen name: Miranda Jarrett Isabella Bradford
- Period: 1992–present
- Genres: historical romance; historical fiction
- Website: susanhollowayscott.com

Susan Holloway Scott is an American author of historical fiction who also writes under several pen names. She has also written historical romance novels under the pen names Miranda Jarrett and Isabella Bradford.

== Biography ==
Scott was born in Washington, D.C., and grew up in northern New Jersey. She attended art school before enrolling at Brown University, where she earned a B.A. in art history. After finishing school, Scott worked in university relations for Brown University, the University of Pennsylvania, and Bryn Mawr College.

Scott's first book, a historical romance called Steal the Stars, was published in 1992 by Harlequin Books under the pen name Miranda Jarrett. Since then, Scott has written over fifty historical novels and novellas under several names, and has been published by Harlequin Books, Pocket Books, Penguin Books, Ballantine Books, St Martin's Press, and Kensington Books. Her books have been published in eleven languages in sixteen foreign countries, with over three and half million copies in print.

Scott has served on the executive board of the Romance Writers of America. She lives with her family near Philadelphia, Pennsylvania.

== Bibliography ==
=== As Susan Holloway Scott ===
==== Published by Kensington Books ====
- I, Eliza Hamilton (2017)
- The Secret Wife of Aaron Burr (2019)

==== Published by Penguin Books ====
- Duchess: A Novel of Sarah Churchill (2006)
- Royal Harlot: A Novel of the Countess of Castlemaine & King Charles II (2007)
- The King's Favorite: A Novel of Nell Gwyn & King Charles II (2008)
- The French Mistress: A Novel of the Duchess of Portsmouth & King Charles II (2009)
- The Countess and the King: A Novel of the Countess of Dorchester & King James II (2010)

=== As Miranda Jarrett ===
Published by Harlequin Books:

- Steal the Stars (1992)
- Columbine (1992)
- Spindrift (1993)
- Providence (1993)
- Mariah's Prize (1994)
- Desire My Love (1994)
- Sparhawk's Lady (1995)
- The Sparhawk Bride (1995)
- Sparhawk's Angel (1996)
- Gift of the Heart (1996)
- The Secrets of Catie Hazard (1997)
- The Golden Lord (2003)
- The Silver Lord (2003)
- Princess of Fortune (2004)
- The Rake's Wager (2005)
- The Lady's Hazard (2005)
- The Duke's Gamble (2006)
- The Adventurous Bride (2006)
- Seduction Of An English Beauty (2007)

==== Novella Anthologies ====
- Christmas Rogues (1995) (with Anita Mills and Patricia Potter)
- Reckless Hearts (2001) (with Heather Graham)
- Gifts of the Season (2002) (with Anne Gracie and Lyn Stone)
- April Moon (2004) (with Susan King and Merline Lovelace)
- The Betrothal (2005) (with Terri Brisbin and Joanne Rock)

==== Published by Pocket Books ====
- The Captain's Bride (1997)
- Cranberry Point (1998)
- Wishing (1999)
- Moonlight (1999)
- Sunrise (2000)
- Starlight (2000)
- Star Bright (2000)
- The Very Daring Duchess (2001)
- The Very Comely Countess (2001)

===== Novella Anthology =====
- Under the Boardwalk (1999) (with Linda Howard, Jillian Hunter, Geralyn Dawson, Mariah Stewart)

=== As Isabella Bradford ===
==== Published by ====
- When You Wish Upon a Duke (2012)
- When the Duchess Said Yes (2012)
- When the Duke Found Love (2012)
- A Wicked Pursuit (2014)
- A Sinful Deception (2015)
- A Reckless Desire (2016)
