= Rose Marks =

American fraudster

- Born: March 3, 1951 (age 75)
- Occupation: Psychic
- Criminal charge: Fraud
- Criminal penalty: 10-year sentence

Rose Marks (born c. 1951) is the American matriarch of a family of fraudulent psychics convicted of federal crimes in 2013 in Florida. Marks and members of her extended family operated multiple storefront businesses, four in Broward County, Florida one of which was in Fort Lauderdale, named "Astrology Life" and one in Manhattan on W. 58th Street near Central Park. They told vulnerable clients that the only solution to their problems was to give the purported psychics money. Prior to this case there was doubt that a psychic could be criminally charged. Jurors were told that fortune-telling is constitutionally protected free speech, but federal prosecutors contended Marks engaged in fraud by promising to keep clients' money safe, "cleanse" it and return it when she had no intention of returning it. The case drew widespread coverage. Charles Stack, a retired Fort Lauderdale police detective, said the case and the ensuing publicity brought attention to predatory and fraudulent fortune tellers.

The family amassed a fortune estimated at between $25 and $40 million. Defense attorney Fred Schwartz said the federal government seized Marks' family assets including cars, motorcycles, a boat, gold, jewelry and a home near the Intracoastal Waterway.

In 2014, Marks was sentenced over 10 years in prison for defrauding clients of her family's fortune-telling businesses out of more than $17.8 million.

== Family background ==
According to Paula McMahon, staff writer for the Sun-Sentinel newspaper, the family are Vlax Roma, the largest Romani group in the US. McMahon states members of this group "traditionally drop out of school when they are 8 or 9 years old" and that "Mothers train daughters to develop what they call 'psychic' or 'intuitive' powers." This training was presented by both prosecutors and the defense during Rose Marks' trial. Schwarz said Marks began working at the age of 8 or 9.

The Marks family immigrated from Greece in the late 19th or early 20th century. Although adhering to Romani cultures and beliefs, like the payment of dowries and arranged marriages, they also worked to assimilate into American life. In an interview with McMahon, Rose Marks said her father was Steve "Boyo" Eli, a land owner and Romani judge. According to Marks, he mediated land, inheritance, divorce and dowry disputes in the Gypsy community near Newark, New Jersey. Marks attended public school until she dropped out in the third grade. She was married in an arranged marriage at 16 or 17 years old, living in Virginia until moving to Broward County in 1998. Marks and her husband opened the fortune-telling storefront in Manhattan.

The family was identified as relatives of the late Gypsy leader, Jimmy Marks of Spokane, Washington by the New York Daily News.

== Criminal proceedings ==
Stack began an investigation into Rose Marks and family in 2007 before retiring from the Fort Lauderdale Police Department. A subsequent federal investigation, "Operation Crystal Ball", resulted in a sixty-one-count indictment, unsealed on August 16, 2011, charging Marks and eight family members with crimes spanning twenty years.

On September 8, 2013, Marks was convicted of all fourteen federal crimes she had been charged with. The charges were one count of conspiracy to commit mail/wire fraud, one count of conspiracy to commit money laundering, two counts of mail fraud, two counts of money laundering, six counts of wire fraud and two counts of filing false income returns. Schwartz said Marks would appeal on several grounds, including "government misconduct" by investigators who failed to record interviews with victims. US magistrate judge James Hopkins had previously criticized the government's conduct but felt it did not meet criteria for dismissal of the case. Mistakes initially made in presenting the case to the grand jury were serious enough to require presentation to a second grand jury. In an unusual ruling, Hopkins ordered that portions of the transcript of the grand jury testimony, normally secret, be made available to the defense. Among the concerns raised were the use of the term "gypsy" as an ethnic stereotype and the inclusion of victims who had not been interviewed including one who insisted he had never been victimized. The indictment handed down was the fourth version.

Eight family members had previously pleaded guilty to a single count of conspiracy to commit wire/mail fraud, they were: Marks's daughter (Rosie Marks), son-in-law (Donnie Eli), her two sons and their wives (Michael Marks & Cynthia Miller and Ricky Marks & Nancy Marks), her sister (Victoria Eli), and granddaughter (Vivian Marks). Before the pleas were entered, defense attorney for Nancy Marks, Michael Gottlieb, filed a 24-page request for dismissal on the grounds of freedom of religion portraying the family's actions as based on their religious beliefs and a belief in spiritual healing. Attorneys for Rose Marks and other family members joined the request. Defense lawyers contended that the prosecution of the family was the most recent example of long-running persecution of the Romani people rooted in a lack of understanding of their culture and bias against them.

Vivian Marks was sentenced to four months each in prison and of house arrest followed by three years' probation on October 7, 2013. The same day, Michael Marks and Ricky Marks were sentenced to six months' house arrest followed by two years' probation and eight months' house arrest followed by two years' probation, respectively.

Rose Marks was sentenced to just over ten years in federal prison on March 3, 2014 for defrauding clients of her family's fortune-telling businesses out of more than $17.8 million. She was convicted of scamming numerous clients, including best-selling romance novelist Jude Deveraux, who was a client since 1991. Victims testified that she convinced them she could swap people's souls between bodies, prevent a woman from conceiving via in vitro fertilization and even use her psychic powers to prevent the Internal Revenue Service from going after them for taxes.

== Details of the crime ==
According to the indictment, there were numerous victims of the Marks family's psychic ruse through the use of "various magicians tricks" creating an impression of genuine psychic ability. The family claimed to communicate directly with Michael the Archangel. The women of the family, including Rose Marks, sometimes used the alias Joyce Michael(s).

Many of the victims had suffered a traumatic loss. Two victims identified by The Palm Beach Post, author Jude Deveraux and another woman were defrauded of $20 million and $1 million, respectively. Deveraux believed the money would be returned after it was "cleansed". The single victim of Vivian Marks identified by the Sun-Sentinel was defrauded of $180,000 which he was told would go to charity work in Africa. Another victim was told that her money had burned in the September 11 attacks. A victim who had been hearing voices in his head was told by Cynthia Miller that she would speak with Michael the Archangel who she said told her the victim needed to sacrifice gold coins. This victim turned $400,000 in gold coins over to Miller. A family curse that could be cured only by the "cleansing" of money and valuables was a scenario frequently employed by the Marks family. Victims included a female US Naval Academy graduate, an English attorney and other highly educated men and women with executive positions.

Michael Vasquez wrote in the Miami Herald that the indictment included the following examples of the methods used by Marks and her family:

- Marks told one client she had a "gift from God" and would provide him divinely inspired direction if he gave her money as a sacrifice that Marks would pray over and later return.
- Nancy Marks told a woman she had been cursed in a prior life and to get rid of the curse a temporary sacrifice of money was needed which would be returned three times over after being set aside for a curse-killing prayer.
- After making a deposit on an expensive watch, Nancy Marks had a client pay off the balance promising to return it after using it to "turn back time and bring love back" to the client. The client received only the empty box.
