= Karen Robards =

American author

- Born: Louisville, Kentucky, USA
- Occupation: Novelist
- Writing career
- Period: 1981–present
- Genres: Thriller, Romance, Romantic Suspense
- Website: karenrobards.com

Karen Robards (born August 24, 1954) is an American author of over fifty novels. After first gaining recognition for her historical romances, Robards became one of the first historical romance novelists to successfully make the switch to contemporary romantic suspense. Her work has been translated into seventeen languages, and has won multiple awards.

== Early life and education ==
Karen Robards sold her first story in 1973. As a teenager working part-time for her orthodontist father, Robards saw a Reader's Digest solicitation for funny anecdotes. She quickly penned and submitted a two-paragraph story. Several weeks later she received a check for $100, and her entry was featured in the December 1973 Reader's Digest.

Her first attempts at writing a novel came while she was attending the University of Kentucky taking a graduate-level creative writing class, when the professor challenged each student to write 50 pages that could be published. After researching what types of books were selling well, Robards chose to write a historical romance, not realizing that she would be required to read her work aloud to the class. Although her professor and classmates laughed at her choice of subject matter, those 50 pages became the basis for her first book, Island Flame. This debut novel was published in 1981, when Robards was in her early 20s.

== Career ==
At the time that Robards's debut novel was published, the typical paperback historical romance novel had a shelf life of only three weeks. After three weeks, her novel was no longer available on bookstore shelves, and her publisher was reluctant to purchase any further work without seeing the sales figures for the current book. Undeterred, Robards dropped out of law school to pursue her writing career. To pay her bills, she took a job in an orthodontic clinic, writing a new novel in the ladies' room at the clinic while on her lunch break. She finished this second book, the contemporary romantic suspense To Love a Man, in three months. The book sold quickly to a different publisher and became the true launchpad for her writing career.

Within the next several years, Robards had three additional historical romances published, including Sea Fire, the sequel to Island Flame, before To Love a Man was officially released. After the publication of To Love a Man, Robards's new publisher contracted her to write two novels per year, one a historical romance and the other contemporary romantic suspense. In the late 1980s and early 1990s, however, publishers began to fear that the contemporary romance market was "dead", and Robards was asked to write only historicals. She switched publishers in the early 1990s, moving to Dell, and convinced them to take a chance on a new contemporary romance. That novel, One Summer, was Robards' first hardcover contemporary novel, and its success convinced Dell to ask Robards to concentrate on her contemporary novels. Her novels have been translated into eleven languages.

According to Romantic Times Magazine, "Robards has a true flair for characterization and excels at adding large doses of humor to the spicy mix." She has won a Romantic Times Career Achievement Award, six Affaire de Coeur Silver Pen awards for favorite romance novelist, along with multiple other awards for her novels.

== Personal life ==
Robards lives in her hometown, Louisville, Kentucky, with her husband, Doug Robards, and their three sons, Jack, Chris, and Peter. Her parents, three brothers, and sister live nearby.

== Bibliography ==
=== Historical romance ===
==== Pirate Series ====
1. Island Flame, 1981
2. Sea Fire, 1982

==== Banning Sisters Series ====
1. Scandalous, 2001
2. Irresistible, 2002
3. Shameless, 2010

==== Historical romance novels, by publication date ====
- Island Flame, 1981
- Sea Fire, 1982
- Forbidden Love, 1983
- Amanda Rose, 1984
- Dark Torment, 1985
- Loving Julia, 1986
- Desire in the Sun, 1988
- Tiger's Eye, 1989
- Morning Song, 1990
- Green Eyes, 1991
- This Side of Heaven, 1991
- Nobody's Angel, 1992
- the enigma of the moon,1997
- Scandalous, 2001
- Irresistible, 2002
- Shameless, 2010
- The Black Swan of Paris, 2020

=== Thriller / romantic suspense ===
==== Jessica Ford Series ====
1. Pursuit, 2009
2. Justice, 2011

==== Dr. Charlotte Stone Series ====
1. The Last Victim, 2012
2. The Last Kiss Goodbye, 2013
3. Her Last Whisper, 2014
4. The Last Time I Saw Her, 2015

==== The Guardian Series ====
1. The Ultimatum, 2017
2. The Moscow Deception, 2018
3. The Fifth Doctrine, 2019

==== Thriller / romantic suspense novels, by publication date ====
- To Love a Man, 1985
- Wild Orchids, 1986
- Night Magic, 1987
- One Summer, 1993
- Maggy's Child, 1994
- Walking After Midnight, 1995
- Hunter's Moon, 1996
- Heartbreaker, 1997
- The Senator's Wife, 1998
- The Midnight Hour, 1999
- Ghost Moon, 2000
- Paradise County, 2000
- To Trust a Stranger, 2001
- Manna From Heaven, 2001 (in anthology Wait Until Dark)
- Whispers at Midnight, 2002
- Beachcomber, 2003
- Bait, 2004
- Superstition, 2005
- Vanished, 2006
- Obsession, 2007
- Guilty, 2008
- Pursuit (Jessica Ford #1), 2009
- Shattered, 2010
- Justice (Jessica Ford #2), 2011
- Sleepwalker, 2011
- The Last Victim (Dr. Charlotte Stone #1), 2012
- Shiver, 2012
- The Last Kiss Goodbye (Dr. Charlotte Stone #2), 2013
- Hunted, 2014
- Her Last Whisper (Dr. Charlotte Stone #3), 2014
- Hush, 2015
- The Last Time I Saw Her (Dr. Charlotte Stone #4), 2015
- Darkness, 2016
- The Ultimatum, 2017
- The Moscow Deception, 2018
- The Fifth Doctrine, 2019

=== Anthologies ===
- Wait Until Dark (2001) (with Linda Anderson, Andrea Kane and Mariah Stewart)

== See also ==
- List of romantic novelists
