= Fawcett Coventry =

Fawcett Books is an imprint of Ballantine Books (now a division of Random House Publishing Group). Fawcett Publications, founded in 1919, published primarily magazines and comics. In 1970 it acquired Popular Library and renamed it Fawcett Books. Fawcett Publications, along with Fawcett Books, was bought by CBS in 1977 and in 1982 Fawcett Books was acquired by Ballantine Books.

Coventry Romance was a historical romance series published by Fawcett Coventry from 1979 to 1982. Most of the stories were set in the Regency era, but also in the Georgian and Victorian eras. Coventry Romance By The Numbers was a numbered list of 206 titles. These books are generally considered to be "traditional" Regency novels.

Un-numbered titles include:

- Tarrington Chase - Sylvia Thorpe, March 1980
- Romantic Lady - Sylvia Thorpe, March 1980
- Star Sapphire - Rebecca Danton, March 1980
- Clarissa - Caroline Arnett, March 1980
- Jewelene - Claudette Williams, March 1980
- An Affair Of The Heart - Joan Smith, March 1980
- Lovers' Vows - Joan Smith, July 1982
- Rosalba - Sheila Bishop, July 1982
- The Reluctant Viscountess - Jasmine Cresswell, July 1982
- Love And Lady Lovelace - Marion Chesney, July 1982
