= Julian Kestrel =

- First appearance: Cut to the Quick
- Last appearance: The Devil in Music
- Created by: Kate Ross

In-universe information
- Gender: Male
- Nationality: British

Julian Kestrel is a fictional character in a four-book mystery series by Kate Ross.

== Overview ==
The series is set in the English Regency era in Great Britain. Kestrel is a trend-setting dandy, similar in influence to Beau Brummel, who takes up detection as a response to boredom with the emptiness of society. Over the course of the series, it is revealed that Kestrel is the son of a talented actress, who died giving birth to him, and the younger son of a Yorkshire squire who was disowned by his well-to-do family after his marriage. He was later mentored by a French nobleman who helped him learn the ways of society and the appropriate way to dress.

Kestrel's partner in detection is his valet Thomas Stokes, known as Dipper. Dipper got his nickname from his first career as a pickpocket. Kestrel hired Dipper after he caught Dipper stealing his watch. Other characters in the series include Dr. Duncan MacGregor, a gruff Scottish-born physician who assists Kestrel in some of his cases; Dipper's sister Sally Stokes, a saucy street prostitute who helps Kestrel and Dipper solve the mysterious death of a "fallen woman" in A Broken Vessel and becomes Kestrel's lover; and Philippa Fontclair, a charming young girl whom Kestrel meets in Cut to the Quick and corresponds with in later novels. The novels are heavily influenced by other fictional British detectives, such as Lord Peter Wimsey and Sherlock Holmes.

Kate Ross died of cancer before she was able to complete more books in the series. However, fans speculated that she might have ultimately intended for Kestrel to marry a grown-up Philippa Fontclair. In Cut to the Quick, the plain but clever and witty 11-year-old Philippa asks Kestrel if he might marry her one day because "I will have money and I am a Fontclair." Kestrel advises the young girl that she should look for a husband who is more interested in her for herself than for her pocketbook and pedigree. He says it is best to be "the one radiant Circe in a season of dreary Helens" and to enchant others with her wit than to be pretty. Philippa then vows to marry Kestrel when she grows up.

== Bibliography ==
The books in the series include

- Cut to the Quick (1994)
- A Broken Vessel (1995)
- Whom the Gods Love (1996)
- The Lullaby Cheat (1997), a short story featuring Kestrel, is included in the mystery anthology Crime Through Time, edited by Miriam Grace Monfredo and Sharan Newman
- The Devil in Music (1998)
