= Kate Ross =

American novelist

Katherine Jean "Kate" Ross (June 21, 1956 – March 12, 1998) was an American mystery author who wrote four books set in Regency-era England about the dandy Julian Kestrel.

== Personal life ==
The daughter of Mr. and Mrs. Edward A. Ross, Kate Ross attended Wellesley College and Yale Law School. A trial lawyer, she worked at Sullivan & Worcester (a Boston law firm) until 1981. She then began her career as a novelist.

Ross died of breast cancer in 1998 at the age of 41, and is interred in Wellesley, Massachusetts.

== Works ==
Her novels include:

- Cut to the Quick (1994), which won the 1994 Gargoyle award for in the category of Best Historical Mystery
- A Broken Vessel (1995)
- Whom the Gods Love (1996)
- The Devil in Music (1997), which won the 1997 Agatha Award for in the category of Best Novel.

Her short stories include:

- "The Lullaby Cheat" (1997), a short story featuring Kestrel, is included in the mystery anthology Crime Through Time, edited by Miriam Grace Monfredo and Sharan Newman.
- "The Unkindest Cut" (1998) was published in the anthology Past Poisons: An Ellis Peters Memorial Anthology of Historical Crime.

== See also ==
- List of female detective/mystery writers
