= Susan King (novelist) =

American novelist

- Born: Susan Longhi; 1951 (age 74–75); New York City, U.S.
- Education: University of Maryland, College Park (BA, MA)
- Occupation: Novelist
- Writing career
- Pen name: Susan King, Sarah Gabriel, Susan Fraser King
- Period: 1994–present
- Genre: Historical romance
- Website: www.susanking.net

Susan King, née Longhi (born 1951 in New York City, United States) is a writer of historical romance novels as Susan King, Sarah Gabriel and Susan Fraser King. King's work has been translated into five languages, and she has received awards from Romantic Times Magazine as well as a RITA Award nomination from the Romance Writers of America.

== Biography ==
Susan Longhi was born in 1951 in New York City, New York, United States, and lived there whilst growing up. She attended the University of Maryland, where she earned a B.A. in Studio Art and an M.A. in Art History. After completing her studies, King lectured in art history and art theory and pursued a doctoral degree in medieval art history, again at the University of Maryland. Following her M.A., King wrote her first novel, The Black Thorne's Rose, which was published by Penguin/Topaz in September 1994. Many of her novels, which have been published in several foreign languages, feature Celtic legends and myths. Her passion for art and history lend her books a high level of historical accuracy and detail that set King's work apart from many others in the genre.

King has been nominated for the Romance Writers of America RITA Award for Best Long Historical. She has been the recipient of the Romantic Times Reviewers' Choice Award for Best Medieval Novel and the Romantic Times Reviewers' Choice Award for Career Achievement in Medieval Historical Romance. She is a member of the Romance Writers of America and Novelists, Inc, and has served as a member of the Board of Directors of the Washington Romance Writers. she holds a graduate degree in medieval art history. King currently resides in Maryland with her family.

== Bibliography ==
=== As Susan King ===
==== Single novels ====
- The Black Thorne's Rose, September 1994
- The Stone Maiden, March 2000 A review of The Stone Maiden
- Thee Sword Maiden, October 2001
- "White Fire" in April Moon, April 2004

==== Scottish Clans (Scott-Macrae-Fraser) series ====
1. The Heather Moon, April 1999
2. The Raven's Moon, February 1997
3. The Raven's Wish, May 1995
4. "The Snow Rose" in A Stockingful of Joy, November 1997

==== Faulkener Family Saga series ====
1. The Angel Knight, May 1996
2. Lady Miracle, September 1997

==== Lindsay Family Saga series ====
1. Laird of the Wind, August 1998
2. The Swan Maiden, January 2001

==== Victorian Scotland Trilogy ====
1. Taming the Heiress, July 2003
2. Waking the Princess, September 2003
3. Kissing the Countess, November 2003

=== As Sara Gabriel ===
==== Single novels ====
- Keeping Kate (2005)
- Stealing Sophie (2005)
- To Wed a Highland Bride (2007)
- The Highland Groom (2008)

=== As Susan Fraser King ===
==== Single novels ====
- Lady Macbeth (2008)
- Queen Hereafter (2010)
