= Jo Beverley =

British-Canadian writer

- Jo Beverley at the Romance Writers of America Literacy signing, 22 July 2015, New York, NY
- Born: Mary Josephine Dunn; 22 September 1947; Blackpool, Lancashire, England, UK
- Died: 23 May 2016 (aged 68); England, UK
- Citizenship: Canada
- Education: Keele University
- Occupation: Novelist
- Spouse: Ken Beverley
- Children: 2
- Writing career
- Pen name: Jo Beverley
- Language: English language
- Period: 1988–2016
- Genres: historical Romance, contemporary Romance
- Notable works: Emily and the Dark Angel, An Unwilling Bride, My Lady Notorious, Deidre and Don Juan, Devilish
- Notable awards: RITA award – Regency Romance; 1992 Emily and the Dark Angel RITA award – Regency Romance; 1993 An Unwilling Bride; RITA award – Historical Series Romance; 1994 My Lady Notorious; RITA award – Regency Romance; 1994 Deidre and Don Juan RITA award – Long Historical Romance; 2001 Devilish
- Website: jobev.com

Mary Josephine Beverley (née Dunn; 22 September 1947 – 23 May 2016) was a prolific English-Canadian writer of historical and contemporary romance novels from 1988 to 2016.

Her works have been translated into several languages, and she has received multiple awards.

== Early life and education ==
Mary Josephine Dunn was born 22 September 1947 in Lancashire, England. She was of Irish descent.

At age 11, she went to an all-girls boarding school, Layton Hill Convent, Blackpool. At 16, she wrote her first romance, with a medieval setting, completed in instalments in an exercise book. She read history and American studies at Keele University in Staffordshire from 1966 to 1970, where she earned a degree in English history. The broad-based learning of Keele's foundation year and the availability of archived Regency-period newspapers were useful resources to enable her to develop her fiction writing.

On 24 June 1971, she married Ken Beverley, whom she met at Keele.

== Career ==
After graduation, she found employment as a youth employment officer. She stayed in this profession until 1976, working first in Newcastle-under-Lyme, Staffordshire, and then in West Bridgford, Nottinghamshire.

In 1976, Beverley moved to Canada, where her scientist husband was invited to do post-doctoral research at Dalhousie University in Halifax, Nova Scotia. When her professional qualifications proved unusable in the Canadian labour market, Beverley decided to develop her early interest in creative writing.

Many of her "Rogue" characters were created in an initial manuscript entitled A Regency Rape. At this point, Beverley did not have a fixed idea of the narrower literary boundaries drawn by the traditional Regency romantic novel and thus created a literary hybrid. A precursor of the Regency historical novel, the work had a more varied cast of characters which, while respectful of the world of Georgette Heyer, broadened the scope and intensity of the genre. At this time Beverley was still unpublished, but devoted her time to caring for her two young sons and participating in the woman-centred childbirth movement, which made her especially careful to portray births in her novels realistically but positively.

The turning point in Beverley's writing career came when her move to Montreal led to her attendance at a talk on "The state of romance in fiction" by Janet Adams, at Beaconsfield Library on 23 May 1984. The executive advisor of the Writers' Association for Romance and Mainstream demystified the creative process for the budding author and was sufficiently impressed by Beverley's writing to act as her agent.

That same year, the family moved to Ottawa, Ontario, Canada, where Beverley became a founding member of the Ottawa Romance Writers' Association (ORWA). Formed in 1985, ORWA became her "nurturing community" for the next 12 years.

In 1988, Beverley, who was actively writing science fiction as well as romance, was a finalist in the L. Ron Hubbard Writers of the Future Contest. That same year, she sold her first romance novel. With her ensuing success in the latter genre, she allowed speculative writing to slide, though elements of it appear periodically in some of her romances and novellas.

Beverly wrote at multiple blogs:

- Jo Talk, a solo blog where "she post[ed] anything that interest[ed] her"
- Minepast, a solo blog where "she share[d] interesting tid-bits of history she discover[ed] as she researche[d] her novels"
- the UK Historical Romance blog
- Word Wenches, a group blog comprising posts by eight women "historical authors who blog about history, writing, and anything vaguely related"

== Personal life ==
Soon after university, Beverley and her husband Ken moved to Ottawa, Ontario, Canada. Beverley became a Canadian with dual citizenship, and she and Ken raised their two sons there, then moved to Victoria, British Columbia.

She and Ken moved back to England in 2009, and they lived in Dawlish, Devon, though they were considering returning to Victoria permanently.

== Later life and death ==
In 2012, Beverley survived a bout with cancer and was in remission for four years. However, the cancer returned and moved very quickly; she succumbed to it on 23 May 2016. She died in a care home in Yorkshire, England.

== Bibliography ==
Traditional Regencies

- Lord Wraybourne's Betrothed (1990) (ISBN 0-8217-3082-7)
- The Stanfourth Secrets (1989) (ISBN 0-380-71438-8)
- The Stolen Bride (1990) (ISBN 0-380-71439-6)
- Emily and the Dark Angel (1992) (ISBN 0-380-71555-4)
- If Fancy Be the Food of Love (1991) (ISBN 0-449-22081-8) (see Novellas below)
- The Fortune Hunter (1992) (ISBN 0-380-71771-9)
- Deirdre and Don Juan (1993) (ISBN 0-380-77281-7)

=== Company of Rogues Series ===
- An Arranged Marriage (1991) (ISBN 0-8217-6401-2) Nicholas and Eleanor
- An Unwilling Bride (1992) (ISBN 0-8217-6724-0) Lucien and Beth
- Christmas Angel (1992) (ISBN 0-8217-3976-X) Leander and Judith
- Forbidden (1994) (ISBN 0-8217-7599-5) Francis and Serena
- Dangerous Joy (1995) (ISBN 0-8217-5129-8) Miles and Felicity
- Dragon's Bride (2001) (ISBN 0-451-20358-5) Con and Susan (A Three Georges Story)
- The Devil's Heiress (2001) (ISBN 0-451-20254-6) Hawk and Clarissa (A Three Georges Story)
- The Demon's Mistress (2001) (ISBN 0-451-20380-1) Van and Maria (A Three Georges Story)
- Hazard (2002) (ISBN 0-451-20580-4) Race and Anne
- St. Raven (2003) (ISBN 0-451-20807-2) Tris and Cressida
- Skylark (2004) (ISBN 0-451-21183-9) Stephen and Laura
- The Rogue's Return (2006) (ISBN 0-451-21788-8) Simon and Jancy
- To Rescue a Rogue (2006) (ISBN 0-451-22011-0) Dare and Mara
- Lady Beware (2007) (ISBN 0-451-22149-4) Darien and Thea
- A Shocking Delight (2014) (ISBN 0-451-46801-5) David and Lucy
- Too Dangerous for a Lady (2015) (ISBN 978-0-698-17570-9) Thayne and Hermione
- The Viscount Needs a Wife (2016) (ISBN 978-0-451-47190-1) Dauntry and Kitty
- Merely a Marriage (2017) (ISBN 0-399-58353-X) Norris and Ariana

=== Medieval Romances ===
- Lord of My Heart (1992) (ISBN 0-451-20642-8)
- Dark Champion (1993) (ISBN 0-451-20766-1)
- The Shattered Rose (1996) (ISBN 0-8217-5310-X)
- Lord of Midnight (1998) (ISBN 0451408012)
- Day of Wrath (see Novellas below)
- The Wise Virgin (ISBN 0-373-83417-9) (see Novellas below)

=== The Malloren Series ===
- My Lady Notorious (1993) (ISBN 0-451-20644-4) Chastity and Cyn
- Tempting Fortune (1995) (ISBN 0-8217-7347-X) Portia and Bryght
- Something Wicked (1997) (ISBN 0-451-21378-5) Elf and Fort
- Secrets of the Night (1999) (ISBN 0-451-21158-8) Rosamunde and Brand
- Devilish (2000) (ISBN 0-451-19997-9) Diana and Rothgar
- Winter Fire (2003) (ISBN 0-451-22346-2) Genova and Ashart
- A Most Unsuitable Man (2005) (ISBN 0-451-21423-4)
- A Lady's Secret (2008) (ISBN 0-451-22419-1) Petra and Robin
- The Secret Wedding (2009) (ISBN 0-451-22651-8)
- The Secret Duke (2010) (ISBN 0-451-22953-3) Bella and Thorn
- An Unlikely Countess (2011) (ISBN 0451232712)
- A Scandalous Countess (2012) (ISBN 0451236041)

=== The Georges Series ===
(related to the Company of Rogues)

- Demon's Mistress (2001) (ISBN 0-451-20380-1)
- Dragon's Bride (2001) (ISBN 0-451-20358-5)
- Devil's Heiress (2001) (ISBN 0-451-20254-6)

=== Novellas and short stories ===
- "The Fruit Picker". Writers of the Future. Vol. IV. 1988. ISBN 0-88404-314-2.
- Grey, Kitty (1991). "If Fancy Be the Food of Love". A Regency Valentine. ISBN 0-449-22081-8.
  - "If Fancy Be the Food of Love". Regency Valentines. 2015. ASIN B00T3P4PHW.
- Michaels, Fern; Martin, Kat; Beverley, Jo; Joyce, Brenda; Sutcliffe, Katherine (1991). "Twelfth Night". Five Golden Rings. ISBN 0-8217-7062-4.
- Allen, Mary Elizabeth (1992). "Lord Samhain's Night". All Hallow's Eve. ISBN 0-8027-1252-5.
- Balogh, Mary (1993). "The Demon's Bride". Moonlight Lovers. ISBN 0-451-17722-3.
- Matthews, Laura (1995). "A Mummer's Play". A Regency Christmas. ISBN 978-0-451-18014-8.
- "Forbidden Affections". A Spring Bouquet. 1996.
- "The Determined Bride". Married at Midnight (Georgian). 1996.
- "A Gift of Light". The Christmas Cat. 1996.
- "The Lord of Elphindale". Faery Magic. 1998. Reissue 2006.
- Beverley, Jo; Moore, Margaret; Simmons, Deborah (1999). "The Wise Virgin". The Brides of Christmas. ISBN 0-373-83417-9.
- Beverley, Jo; Alfonsi, Alice; Farraday, Tess; Freiman, Kate (1999). "Day of Wrath". Star of Wonder. ISBN 0-515-12653-5.
- Beverley, Jo; Maxwell, Cathy; Reding, Jaclyn; Royal, Lauren (2001). "The Demon's Mistress". In Praise of Younger Men. ISBN 0-451-20380-1.
- "The Trouble With Heroes". Irresistible Forces (Trade ed.). 2004. MM 2006
- "The Dragon and the Virgin Princess". Dragon Lovers. 2007.
- "The Raven and the Rose ...". Chalice of Roses. 2010.
- "The Marrying Maid". Songs of Love and Death. 2010.

=== Single novels ===
- Forbidden Magic (1995) (ISBN 0-451-21613-X)

=== Non-fiction ===
- "An Honorable Profession: The Romance Writer and Her Characters" essay in North American Romance Writers (1999, ISBN 0810836041)

== Awards and reception ==
Her works have been translated into many languages and won her many awards.

Awards for Jo Beverley
Year	Nominated work	Category	Award	Result	Notes	Ref.
1992	Emily and the Dark Angel	Regency Romance	Romance Writers of America RITA Award	Won		
1993	An Unwilling Bride	Regency Romance	Romance Writers of America RITA Award	Won		
1994	My Lady Notorious	Historical Series Romance	Romance Writers of America RITA Award	Won		
1994	Deidre and Don Juan	Regency Romance	Romance Writers of America RITA Award	Won		
2001	Devilish	Long Historical Romance	Romance Writers of America RITA Award	Won		

Other awards include two Career Achievement Awards from Romantic Times. She also won The Golden Leaf Award, and the Readers' Choice Award. A member of the Romance Writers of America (RWA) Honor Roll, Beverley was also inducted into the RWA Hall of Fame. She is the only Canadian to be inducted.
