= Jude Deveraux =

American author of historical romances

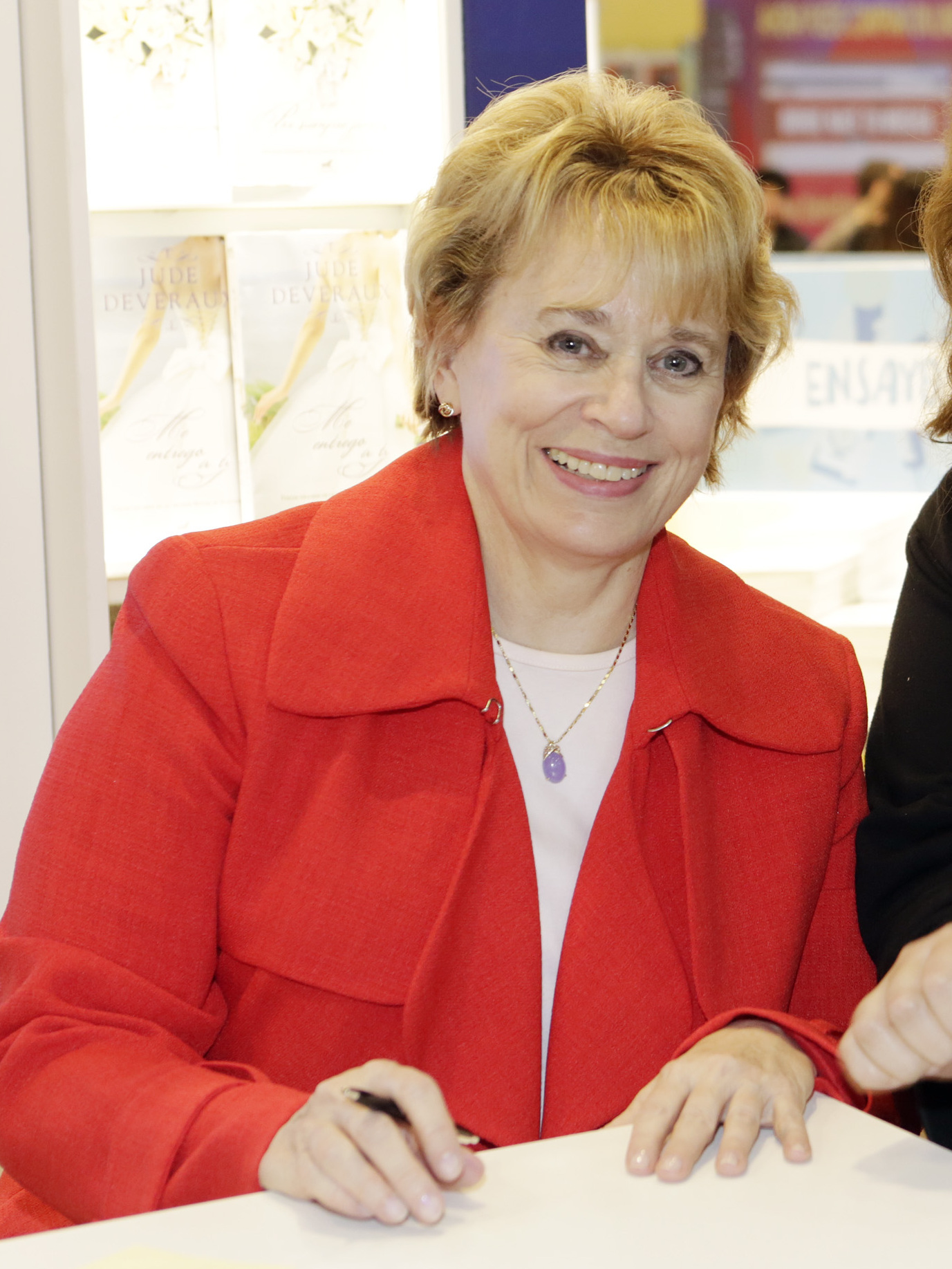
- Deveraux at the 2016 Buenos Aires Book Fair in Argentina
- Born: Jude Gilliam; September 20, 1947 (age 78); Fairdale, Kentucky, U.S.
- Occupation: Novelist
- Spouses: Richard Side (m. 1967; div. 1969) Claude White (m. 1987; div. 1991) Mohammed Montassir (divorced)
- Writing career
- Pen name: Jude Deveraux
- Period: 1977–present
- Genres: Romance, historical, paranormal, mystery
- Website: judedeveraux.com

Jude Deveraux (born September 20, 1947; née Jude Gilliam) is an American author of historical romances. Deveraux has written more than 40 novels, many of which have been on The New York Times Best Seller list, including such titles as A Knight in Shining Armor and Remembrance; she has sold in excess of 50 million copies as of 2016. Deveraux appeared as herself in the 1987 romance novelist documentary Where the Heart Roams.

== Literary work ==
Known for her historical romances with storylines centered on strong, capable heroines, Deveraux has written stories set in several time periods, including post-Revolutionary America, nineteenth century Colorado, and nineteenth century New Mexico. Many of her books follow the Montgomery and Taggert families and contain recurring characters.

She has written several time-travel romances, and her later novels have had a contemporary setting. Many of her more recent books feature paranormal storylines.

In 2009, she was one of four authors who produced works for the debut of Vook, a company which produces "video books" by combining text, video and internet links into a single experience.

Deveraux wrote A Girl From Summer Hill, a contemporary reimagining of Jane Austen's Pride and Prejudice in 2016.

== Personal life ==
Deveraux was born in Fairdale, Kentucky, United States. She was married to Richard Sides from 1967 to 1969. In the late 1960s, she met Claude White, whom she began living with in 1970. They married in 1987 and divorced in 1991. In 1991, while on a tour of Egypt with White, she met Mohammed Montassir. They eventually married and had a son together, named Sam Alexander Montassir. Their son died in 2005, at the age of eight, when he was hit by a truck near their home in North Carolina.

=== Association with Rose Marks ===
In 1991, Deveraux first met psychic Rose Marks, whom she knew as "Joyce Michael". She initially visited Marks for a psychic reading, due to problems with her marriage to White and with infertility. The relationship strengthened after her son's death, and Marks isolated Deveraux from her friends and family. Marks offered her the ability to continue to contact her son as well as to save him from being "caught between heaven and hell".

Over the course of 17 years, Marks extracted between 17 and 20 million dollars from Deveraux, leaving her with almost no money despite her lucrative writing career. Marks told Deveraux as well as other victims that their money and valuables were cursed by malign influence and needed to be given to her for "cleansing rituals" and that they would be returned; yet the items never were returned. She was found guilty of fraud in a trial in 2013, and lost an appeal of her sentence in 2016.

== Bibliography ==
=== The Montgomery/Taggert Family ===
- Chronological order
1. The Black Lyon (1980) [Ranulf de Warbrooke & Lyonene Tompkins, 1275]
2. The Maiden (1988) [Prince Rowan & Princess Jura, 1299]
3. The Velvet Promise (1981) [Gavin Montgomery & Judith Revedoune, 1501]
4. Highland Velvet (1982) [Stephen Montgomery & Bronwyn MacArran, 1501]
5. Velvet Song (1983) [Raine Montgomery & Alyxandra Blackett, 1502]
6. Velvet Angel (1983) [Miles Montgomery & Elizabeth Chatworth, 1502]
7. The Heiress (1995) [Axia Maidenhall & Jamie Montgomery, 1572]
8. The Raider (1987) [Jessica Taggert & Alexander Montgomery, 1766]
9. Mountain Laurel (1990) [Maddie Worth & Christopher Hring "'Ring" Montgomery, 1859]
10. Eternity (1992) [Carrie Montgomery & Joshua Greene Templeton, 1865]
11. The Duchess (1991) [John "Trevelyan" Montgomery & Claire Willoughby, 1883]
12. Twin of Fire (1985) [Leander Westfield & Blair Chandler, 1892]
13. Twin of Ice (1985) [Kane Taggert & Houston Chandler, 1892]
14. The Temptress (1986) [Christiana Montgomery Mathison & Tynan Dysan, 1896]
15. Wishes (1989) [Jocelyn "Jace" Montgomery & Nellie Grayson, 1896]
16. The Awakening (1988) [Amanda Caulden & Henry "Hank" Montgomery, 1913]
17. "The Invitation" from The Invitation (1994) [Jacqueline O'Neill & William "Billy" Montgomery, 1934]
18. The Princess (1987) [Jarl Tynan "J.T." Montgomery & Princess Victoria Jura "Aria" Cilean Xenita, 1942]
19. A Knight in Shining Armor (1989) [Nicholas Stafford & Dougless Montgomery, 1988-1564]
20. Sweet Liar (1992) [Samantha Elliot & Michael Taggert, 1991]
21. "Matchmakers" from The Invitation (1994) [Cale Anderson & Kane Taggert, 1991]
22. "Change of Heart" from Holiday of Love (1994) [Frank Taggert & Miranda Harcourt (Stowe)]
23. "Just Curious" from A Gift of Love (1995) [Macallister J. Taggert & Karen Lawrence]
24. High Tide (1999) [Fiona Burkenhalter & Paul "Ace" Montgomery]
25. Holly (2003) [Nick Taggert & Hollander Latham]
26. Someone to Love (2007) [Jace Montgomery & Nightingale Smythe, 2005]
27. Met Her Match (September 17, 2019) [Nate Taggert & Terri Rayburn]

==== Forever Trilogy (Montgomery/Taggert) ====
1. Forever... A Novel of Good and Evil (2002) [Darci T. Monroe & Adam Montgomery]
2. Forever and Always (2003) [Darci Montgomery & Lincoln Ames]
3. Always (2004) [Darci Montgomery & Jack Rose, 2004-1843]

==== Nantucket Brides Trilogy (Montgomery/Taggert) ====
1. True Love (2013) [Alixandra Madsen & Jared Montgomery Kingsley VII, 2012]
2. For All Time (2014) [Toby Wydnam & Graydon Montgomery]
3. Ever After (2015) [Hallie Hartley & James Taggert]

=== The James River series ===
- Chronological order
1. Sweetbriar (1983) [Linnet Tyler & Devon Macallister, 1784]
2. Counterfeit Lady (1984) [Nicole Courtelain & Clayton Armstrong, 1794]
3. Lost Lady (1985) [Regan West & Travis Stanford, 1797]
4. River Lady (1985) [Leah Simmons & Wesley Stanford, 1803]

=== The Peregrine Family ===
- The Taming (1989) [Rogan Peregrine & Lianna Neville, 1445]
- The Conquest (1991) [Zared Peregrine & Tearle Howard, 1447]

=== The Legend series ===
- Legend (1996) [Cole Tarik Jordan & Kady Long, 1996-1873]
- "The Teacher" from Upon a Midnight Clear (1997) [Cole Jordan & Kathryn DeLonge, 1880s]

=== The Summerhouse series ===
1. The Summerhouse (2001)
2. Return to Summerhouse (2008)
3. As You Wish (2018)

=== The Endenton series ===
1. First Impressions (2005)
2. Carolina Isle (2006)

=== The Edilean series ===
- Chronological order
1. Days of Gold (2009) [Edilean Talbot & Angus McTern, 1766, Scotland and Virginia]
2. The Scent of Jasmine (2010) [Catherine "Cay" Harcourt & Alex McDowell, 1799]
3. Promises VOOK (2010) [Ethne McTern & Jamie Armitage, 1800]
4. Lavender Morning (2009) [Jocelyn Minton & Luke Connor]
5. Scarlet Nights (2010) [Sara Shaw & Mike Newland]
6. Heartwishes (2011) [Gemma Ranford & Colin Frazier]
7. Change of Heart (2014) [Eli & Chelsea] (Sequel to the short story Change of Heart in A Holiday of Love)

==== The Moonlight Trilogy ====
- This trilogy takes place in Edilean, VA. It is not part of the original sequence but contains characters that appeared within it.
1. Moonlight in the Morning (2011) [Jecca Layton & Dr. Tristan Aldredge]
2. Stranger in the Moonlight (2012) [Kim Aldredge & Travis Maxwell]
3. Moonlight Masquerade (2013) [Dr. Reede Aldredge & Sophie Kincaid]

=== Summer Hill Novels ===
1. The Girl from Summer Hill (2016)
2. Met Her Match (2019)

=== Medlar Mysteries ===
1. A Willing Murder (2018)
2. A Justified Murder (2019)
3. A Forgotten Murder (2020)
4. A Relative Murder (2022)
5. An Unfinished Murder (2024)

=== Providence Falls (with Tara Sheets) ===
1. Chance of a Lifetime (2020)
2. An Impossible Promise (September 2021)
3. Thief of Fate (October 2022)

=== Blue Swan series ===
1. Order of Swans (2025)
2. Order of Royals (TBD)
3. Order of the Beast (TBD)

=== Stand alones ===
- The Enchanted Land (1978)
- Casa Grande (1982)
- "A Perfect Arrangement" from The Invitation (1994)
- Remembrance (1994)
- An Angel for Emily (1998) [Emily Jane Todd & Michael]
- The Blessing (1998) [Amy Thompkins & Jason Wilding]
- Temptation (2000)
- "Unfinished Business" from A Season in the Highlands (2000)
- The Mulberry Tree (2002) [Lillian Manville (Bailey James) & Matthew Longacre]
- Wild Orchids (2003)
- Secrets (2008)
- Meant to Be (2021)
- My Heart Will Find You (2023)

=== Anthologies ===
- A Holiday of Love (1994)
- A Gift of Love (1996)
- Upon a Midnight Clear (1997)
- Simple Gifts (1998)
- A Season in the Highlands (2000)
