= Friday Harbor =

Friday Harbor may refer to:

- Friday Harbor, Washington
- Friday Harbor Laboratories, a marine biology field station of the University of Washington
- Friday Harbor (series), a series of romance novels by Lisa Kleypas
- Friday Harbour Resort, a mixed-use development in Innisfil, Ontario, Canada.
