= Barclay, Ontario =

Barclay may refer to one of two southern Ontario communities:

- Barclay, Innisfil near the western shore of Lake Simcoe
- Barclay, Kawartha Lakes
