= Friday Harbor (series) =

Friday Harbor is a series of contemporary romance novels written by best-selling author Lisa Kleypas. The series focuses on the lives of the Nolan family and is set in the San Juan Islands off the coast of Washington.

== Books ==
- Christmas Eve at Friday Harbor (2010)
- Rainshadow Road (2012)
- Dream Lake (2012)
- Crystal Cove (2013)

== TV film ==
Christmas with Holly, a TV-movie adaptation of Christmas Eve at Friday Harbor, aired on ABC in 2012.
