= Loretta Chase =

American writer

Loretta Lynda Chekani Chase
- Born: 1949 (age 76–77); U.S.A.
- Occupation: Novelist
- Writing career
- Pen name: Loretta Chase
- Period: 1987-present
- Genre: Romance
- Notable works: The Sandalwood Princess, Lord of Scoundrels
- Notable awards: RITA award – Regency Romance; 1991 The Sandalwood Princess; RITA award – Short Historical Romance; 1996 Lord of Scoundrels
- Website: www.lorettachase.com

Loretta Chase, née Loretta Lynda Chekani (born 1949) is an American writer of romance novels since 1987.

== Early life and education ==
Loretta Lynda Chekani was born in 1949 in a family of Albanian origin. She studied at New England public schools before receiving a bachelor's degree from Clark University, where she majored in English.

== Career ==
Her past jobs include clerical, administrative, and part-time teaching at Clark and a "Dickensian six-month experience" as a meter maid. After college, her first professional writing job was for an exhibition catalog. This led to a job moonlighting as a corporate video scriptwriter. During this time she met a video producer who enticed her to write novels...and eventually to marry him. Her first Regency manuscript, Isabella, was bought by the first New York editor who read it and led to a successful career as a romance author. Chase said of her marriage: "The books resulting from this union have won a surprising number of awards, including the Romance Writers of America RITA® Award." Her books have also won several Romantic Times Reviewers' Choice awards, various RRA-L (Romance Readers Anonymous) awards, and the All About Romance Top 100 Romances award multiple times.

== Bibliography ==
=== Trevelyan Family Saga Series ===
1. Isabella 1987/Nov
2. The English Witch 1988/Jul

=== Regency Series ===
1. Viscount Vagabond 1989/Jan
2. The Devil's Delilah 1989/Jun

=== Scoundrels Series ===
1. The Lion's Daughter 1992/Oct
2. Captives of the Night 1994/Mar
3. Lord of Scoundrels 1995/Jan
4. "The Mad Earl's Bride" in Three Weddings and a Kiss 1995/Sep (with Catherine Anderson, Lisa Kleypas and Kathleen E. Woodiwiss)
5. The Last Hellion 1998/Apr

=== Carsington Brothers Series ===
1. Miss Wonderful 2004/Mar
2. Mr. Impossible 2005/Mar
3. Lord Perfect 2006/Mar
4. Not Quite a Lady 2007/May
5. Last Night's Scandal 2010/Aug

=== Fallen Women Series ===
1. Not Quite a Lady 2007/May
2. Your Scandalous Ways 2008/Jun
3. Don't Tempt Me 2009/Jul

=== Single Novels ===
- Knave's Wager 1990/Jun
- The Sandalwood Princess 1990/Dec

=== Omnibus ===
- Isabella and the English Witch, 2003
- Viscount Vagabond and Devil's Delilah, 2004
- The Sandalwood Princess / Knave's Wager, 2004

=== Dressmakers Series ===
- Silk is for Seduction , 2011/July
- Scandal Wears Satin , 2012/June
- Vixen in Velvet , 2014/June
- Dukes Prefer Blonds , 2015/December

=== Difficult Dukes Series ===
- A Duke in Shining Armour 2017
- Ten Things I Hate About The Duke 2020
- My Inconvenient Duke 2025

=== Anthologies (Other) ===
- "Falling Stars" in A Christmas Collection 1992 (with Stella Cameron, Joan Hohl and Linda Lael Miller)
- "Falling Stars" in A Christmas Present 1994 (with Judith E. French and Lisa Kleypas)
- "The Mad Earl's Bride" in Three Times a Bride 2010/May (with Catherine Anderson and Samantha James)
- "Lord Lovedon's Duel" in Royal Bridesmaids 2012/July (with Stephanie Laurens and Gaelen Foley)

=== Non-fiction ===
- "Historical Romance—The Path I’ve Taken" essay in North American Romance Writers (1999, ISBN 0810836041)

== Awards ==
Awards for Loretta Chase
Year	Nominated work	Category	Award	Result	Notes	Ref.
1991	The Sandalwood Princess	Regency Romance	Romance Writers of America RITA Award	Won		
1995	Lord of Scoundrels	Regency Historical Romance	Romantic Times Reviewers' Choice Award	Won		
1996	Lord of Scoundrels	Short Historical Romance	Romance Writers of America RITA Award	Won		
1998	The Last Hellion	British Isles Historical Romance	Romantic Times Reviewers' Choice Award	Won		
2004	Miss Wonderful	First Historical Romance	Romantic Times Reviewers' Choice Award	Won		
2009	Don't Tempt Me	Historical Love & Laughter	Romantic Times Reviewers' Choice Award	Won		
2011		Historical Romance	Romantic Times Career Achievement Award	Won		

== Sources ==
- Loretta Chase, "Die wilde Braut des Duke", Regency Romance, Verlag dp DIGITAL PUBLISHERS
