= Lord of Scoundrels =

Book by Loretta Chase

- Author: Loretta Chase
- Language: English
- Genre: Regency romance
- Publisher: Avon Books
- Publication date: 1995
- Publication place: United States
- Pages: 384
- ISBN: 978-0380776160
- Preceded by: Captives of the Night
- Followed by: The Last Hellion

Lord of Scoundrels is a Regency romance novel by American author Loretta Chase. Published in 1995 by Avon Books, it is the third installment of her Débauchés series. Set in 1828, the story follows the Marquess of Dain, an aristocrat known as "Lord Beelzebub" and the "Lord of Scoundrels" for his unscrupulous, immoral behavior. The son of an English father and Italian mother, Dain is hardened due to a difficult childhood and meets his match in Jessica Trent, a 27-year-old bluestocking more than capable of trading wits with him.

Chase had a love for Italian culture, and decided that this background would provide ample motivation for Dain, being the product of his parents' inability to understand each other's cultures. As with many of her stories, Chase made her heroine a strong female, deciding to model Jessica after the type of women who lived a few generations previously and who had "a more practical, frank attitude toward sex". Lord of Scoundrels is a retelling of the fairytale Beauty and the Beast, with the author stating that like the Beast, Dain is an outcast and misfit among his society.

Lord of Scoundrels was positively received upon its release, and in 1996 it earned the RITA Award for "Best Short Historical", a prize given annually by the Romance Writers of America. Also during that year, Lord of Scoundrels won the Romantic Times' "Regency Historical Romance" award. Literary critics and romance readers have since described it as one of the best historical romances ever written, praising the novel for its wit and well-developed characters.

== Plot summary ==
Background

In the story's prologue, Sebastian Ballister is born in Devon to the 2nd Marquess of Dain and his Italian wife, Lucia Usignuolo. The Marquess is disgusted with the child, describing him as the "Devil's spawn" and a "wizened olive thing with large black eyes, ill-proportioned limbs, and a grossly oversize nose". Eight years later, the tempestuous Lucia abandons her husband for her lover. Unloved by his father and told that his mother is an "evil, godless creature", Sebastian is sent off to Eton where he is teased by his classmates over his appearance. The boy grows up learning to hide his feelings; given no inheritance by his father, Sebastian acquires clever ways to make his fortune and uses money to unscrupulously get his way.

Plot

The story begins in 1828, Paris. Sebastian, now the intelligent but immoral 3rd Marquess of Dain, meets his match in Miss Jessica Trent, who has arrived in the city to rescue her unintelligent, nearly penniless brother Bertie from Dain's bad influence. Dain and Jessica are instantly attracted to the other, though each seeks to hide their feelings. Dain has developed a hard, sarcastic personality; he is hostile to noblewomen, as he believes they care only for money. Jessica, a 27-year-old beautiful, strong-willed bluestocking, has refused dozens of marriage proposals over the years and wishes to maintain her independence.

The two exchange wits; Jessica requests that Dain send her brother back to England in exchange for a valuable religious icon she will sell him, while Dain wants the icon or else he will destroy her reputation and ruin her brother. They reach an impasse, and while her reputation remains intact, Dain spends the week personally overseeing Bertie's disintegration from excessive drinking and gambling. Jessica angrily confronts him and the two unexpectedly kiss. Later, at a party they almost consummate their relationship before being discovered by other party-goers. Dain coldly departs, assuming Jessica invited the others to force him to honorably marry her, leaving her angry that he would leave her reputation in tatters so casually.

Jessica sues him for the loss of her reputation. To her surprise, Dain converts this proposition into a marriage proposal, and they are wedded in London several weeks later. En route to his estate in Devon, Dain assumes she is repulsed by his "gross blackamoor's body", when the opposite is true. Filled with self-loathing over his appearance and personality, Dain initially avoids consummating their relationship despite Jessica's efforts to seduce him. They eventually do, and Dain apologizes for what he realizes has been his difficult behavior.

Later, they enter into a disagreement over his illegitimate son; Dain despises the eight-year-old boy's calculating mother and wants nothing to do with them, while Jessica sympathetically wants to rescue the boy from his poor living conditions. The boy, Dominick, is becoming ill-behaved and reminds Dain self-loathingly of himself at his age. Eventually, with Jessica's prodding, Dain is persuaded to rescue the neglected boy from his mother's clutches. While doing so, the Marquess comes to terms with his mother's abandonment and realizes that Dominick is just as scared and lonely as he was as a boy. Dominick is invited to live at the Ballister estate, while the boy's mother, to her pleasure, is given a large stipend and told to find her fortune in Paris.

== Background and development ==
American author Loretta Chase began her writing career in 1987 by crafting traditional novels in the Regency romance literary subgenre; Lord of Scoundrels, published in 1995, was her ninth such novel released. It was the third installment of her Débauchés (also known as Scoundrels) series, following The Lion's Daughter (1992) and Captives of the Night (1994). As such, some of the characters who feature in Lord of Scoundrels, such as the Comte d'Esmond and Francis Beaumont, also appear in previous Chase works. In 2007, Chase said Lord of Scoundrels was her only book "that came to me as a gift from the writing gods. Every other book is a struggle, some bloodier than others. This book was pure fun from start to finish".

Possessing a love for Italian culture, Chase decided to make her male protagonist, Dain, a "mongrel English aristocrat" and half-Italian. By giving Dain Italian ancestry through his mother, Chase was able to develop his character and justify his motivations. She explains, "Having Dain be half-Italian fit so many aspects of his story: his background as well as his behavior, which does get operatic at times". Chase adds that Dain's difficult childhood stemmed from his parents' inability to accept each other's cultures, which then "warps him and makes him a misfit. In a loving household, he would have grown up with a better self-image, and would have dealt with bullying at school in a different way, and thus would have grown up into someone altogether different from the man Jessica meets in that antique shop".

When writing the novel, Chase knew that her female protagonist had to be strong enough to equal Dain's forceful personality. Chase admits that because the novel is set in the period leading up to the Victorian era, a woman like Jessica could not have dealt with Dain, writing that "if Jessica were like what we assume to be the typical young lady of her time, she could never handle Dain, and he’d think her too boring to live". Chase instead modeled Jessica after the type of women who lived a few generations previously and who had "a more practical, frank attitude toward sex".

Wishing to depict Jessica as the "Extreme Female", Chase emphasizes her clothing and gives Dain "a chance to exercise his caustic wit", as he deems the latest fashions to be ridiculous. Upon their first meeting he silently observes that Jessica is wearing "a blue overgarment of some sort and one of the hideously overdecorated bonnets currently in fashion". Jessica differs from many other Chase heroines by being interested in fashion; the author felt that "the way they dress, to a great extent, tells us who they are, in the same way that other heroines’ simpler or less fashionable attire expresses something about them".

== Analysis ==
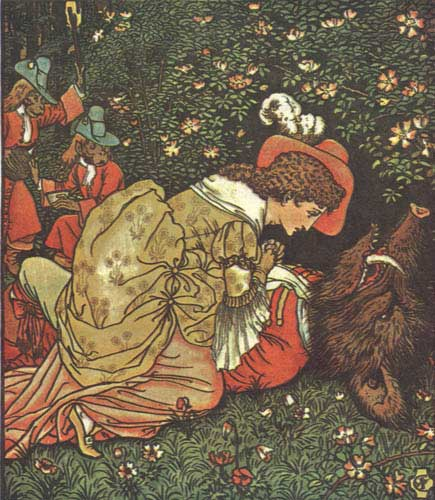
Lord of Scoundrels has been described as a modern retelling of Beauty and the Beast (1874 representation pictured)

Lord of Scoundrels is typically classified as a Regency romance novel, though its story is set in the post-Regency era of 1828. It features a strong female heroine, a characteristic that Chase has become known for including in her romances. The author explains that "for most of history, and in too many cases today, women are considered (and too often consider themselves) lesser beings who do not matter. In my books, the women are not lesser, and they do matter. In other words, I make the world the way I think it should be". Romantic fiction scholars have identified Jessica Trent as a "feminist heroine" with whom the "alpha male hero" has met his match. Chase inverts many qualities typical of the archetypical romantic hero and heroine. Near the end of the story, Jessica is the one who initiates consummation of their marriage, by seducing Dain. Afterwards, Jessica promptly falls asleep, causing her husband to seethe "that was what he was supposed to do".

In her entry for The Bloomsbury Introduction to Popular Fiction, Maryan Wherry posits that Lord of Scoundrels represents a modern retelling of the classic fairytale Beauty and the Beast, suggesting Chase's story is a morality tale of "restoring humanity" that is directed at "all levels of society" (rather than at the lower classes as classic fairytales were intended). Chase makes direct reference to this fairytale in the novel, when Dain silently compares his relationship with Jessica to that of Beauty and the Beast.

In a 2007 interview, the author described the novel as her "Beauty and the Beast story", stating that like the Beast, Dain is an outcast and misfit among the novel's society. Chase describes Dain as "truly awful: rude, overbearing, and intimidating... He consciously uses his monstrousness in the same way he uses his vast wealth and his social position: to control his world and protect himself. It's sad, in a way, because he’s isolated, like the Beast of the fairy tale trapped in his castle. But Dain is not pitiful by any means: He’s smart, cynical, and sarcastic, with a sharp eye for the ridiculous. He has a sense of humor and is adept with clever comebacks and putdowns". Jessica represents the Beauty of the story, someone who "enters the Beast’s lair of her own accord" as his equal "no matter how awful" he acts.

Leading up to the couple's marriage, Dain cynically makes many assurances that he will provide for Jessica financially. At one point, Jessica brings a defamation lawsuit against Dain before they agree to convert it into a prenuptial agreement, leading English professor Jayashree Kamblé to liken their relationship to "a take-over bid". Kamblé has studied the presence of capitalism and modern economics on storylines in the contemporary romance genre. To her, while Lord of Scoundrels is a Regency romance novel and thus less apt to depict the types of economic pairings seen in many contemporary romances, Kamblé argues that Dain's repeated monetary promises still contain "echoes of the kind of wealth, monetary security, and financial reward that the heroes of Harlequin Mills and Boon promise as husbands". The couple is physically attracted to each other, while financial considerations also play a factor.

== Release and reception ==
Lord of Scoundrels was released in January 1995 by Avon Books, the same publisher that had released Chase's last two novels. According to Chase's website, the novel has been published in over fourteen languages. A Spanish translation was released in 2006, while a Japanese translation was released in 2008. Its e-book edition, published by HarperCollins, landed on The New York Times Best Seller list in August 2011. In 1996, the novel earned the RITA Award for "Best Short Historical", a prize given annually by the Romance Writers of America. It also won the 1996 "Regency Historical Romance" award, granted by the Romantic Times. In a review by that publication, M. Helfer praised Chase for being "an exquisite storyteller who creates sharply original characters and moves them in new and exciting ways. One of the true treasures of the genre, she epitomizes the essence of excellence in every word she writes".

Soon after its release, the book also won accolades from other award bodies, including "Best Historical Single Title Romance" by Romance Readers Anonymous and "Best Historical Romance" by Reader's Voice. In 2014, romance novelist Madeline Hunter recalled Lord of Scoundrels being "the 'must read' of the season" when it was published in 1995, and described it as "witty, heartfelt, with a flawed hero and an indomitable heroine, [and with] pacing so perfect a reader could only hold on for the ride. It was no surprise that a book that pushed so many peoples' happy buttons ended up winning a RITA that year. I think there would have been a revolt if it had not".

The novel's popularity has endured and it is still considered one of the best historical romances ever published. The website "All about Romance" voted it in first place for four years, and it was also deemed the "Best All-Time Historical Romance" by Romance Readers Anonymous for four years. In a 2010 list of "must-reads in romance" for Kirkus Reviews, Sarah Wendell deemed it her favorite historical romance and believed her successful recommendation to a male professor proved its worth. Author Anne Browning Walker, in a similar list of "Smart Romance Books" for Publishers Weekly, included Lord of Scoundrels and observed Chase's penchant for "creating smart, thoughtful, witty, and well-meaning heroines". Also writing for Publishers Weekly, author Beverly Jenkins called Lord of Scoundrels an example of "Chase at the top of her game" and opined that its "characters are full-bodied and evenly matched. The passion is to die for, and every romance reader I know has this book on their keeper shelf".

Elissa Petruzzi of RT Book Reviews wrote in 2014, "Some consider Loretta Chase’s epic tale to be the best Regency ever written". Novelist Eloisa James recommended Lord of Scoundrels for readers interested in trying historical romance for the first time, saying the novel is "just brilliant, hysterically funny, sexy dialogue". Chase herself has expressed surprise at the novel's enduring popularity, writing that she "saw no indication it would become such a reader favorite". On January 23, 2015, fans discussed their views and favorite parts of the novel on Twitter, using the hashtag #LOSlove, and Avon Books randomly gave away signed copies to those participating.
