= Friday Harbor, Washington =

- Town
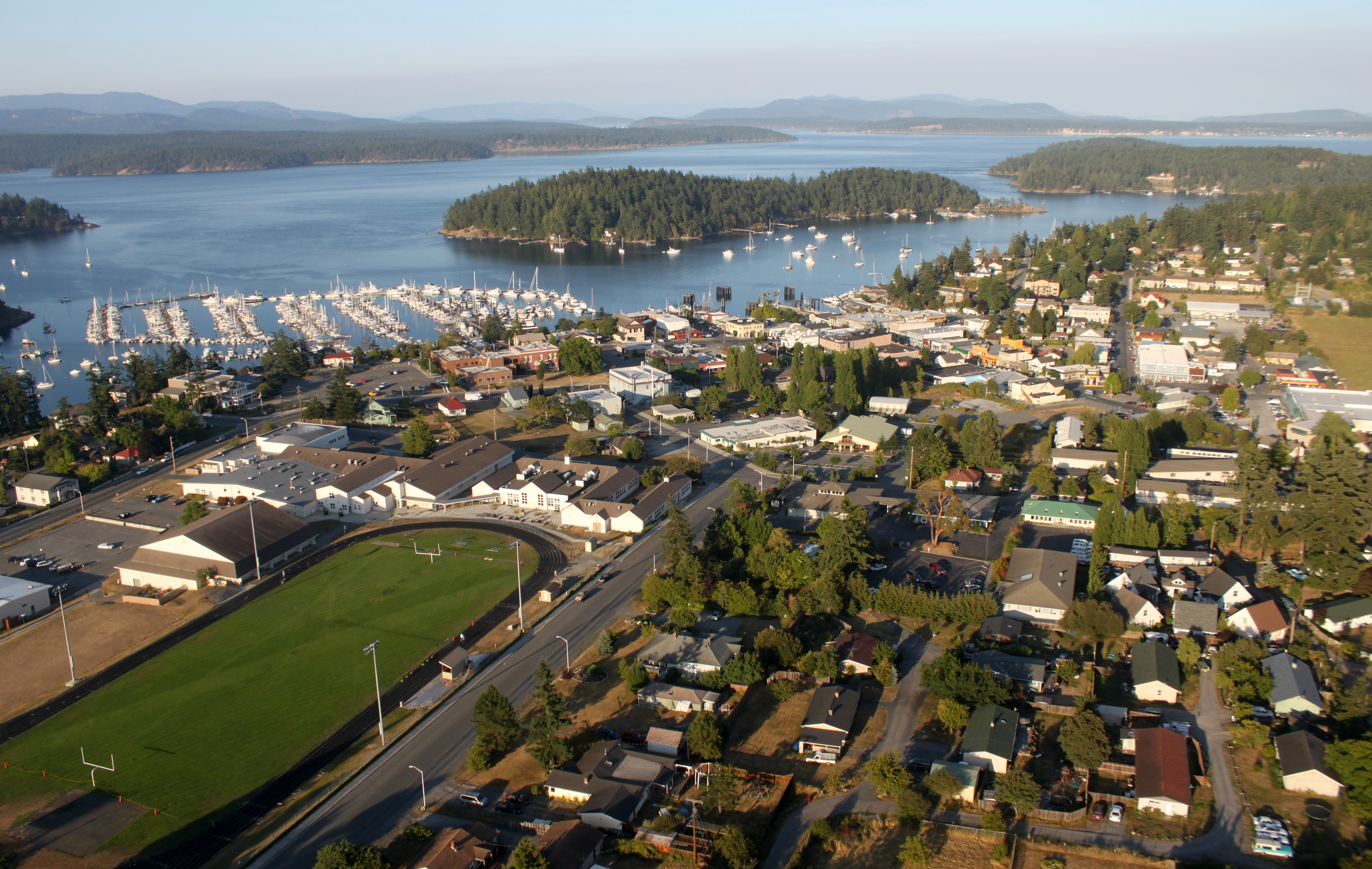
- Friday Harbor, Washington

- Location of Friday Harbor, Washington
- Coordinates: 48°31′59″N 123°04′35″W
- Country: United States
- State: Washington
- County: San Juan
- Incorporated: February 10, 1909

Government
  - Type: Mayor–council
  - Mayor: Evan Perrollaz

Area
  - Total: 2.25 sq mi (5.84 km^{2})
  - Land: 2.18 sq mi (5.65 km^{2})
  - Water: 0.069 sq mi (0.18 km^{2})
- Elevation: 115 ft (35 m)

Population (2020)
  - Total: 2,613
  - Density: 1,200/sq mi (462/km^{2})
- Time zone: UTC−8 (Pacific (PST))
  - Summer (DST): UTC−7 (PDT)
- ZIP Code: 98250
- Area codes: 360 and 564
- FIPS code: 53-25615
- GNIS feature ID: 2412659
- Website: www.fridayharbor.gov

Friday Harbor is a town in San Juan County, Washington, United States. The population was 2,613 at the 2020 census. Located on San Juan Island, Friday Harbor is the major commercial center of the San Juan Islands archipelago and is the county seat of San Juan County.

== History ==
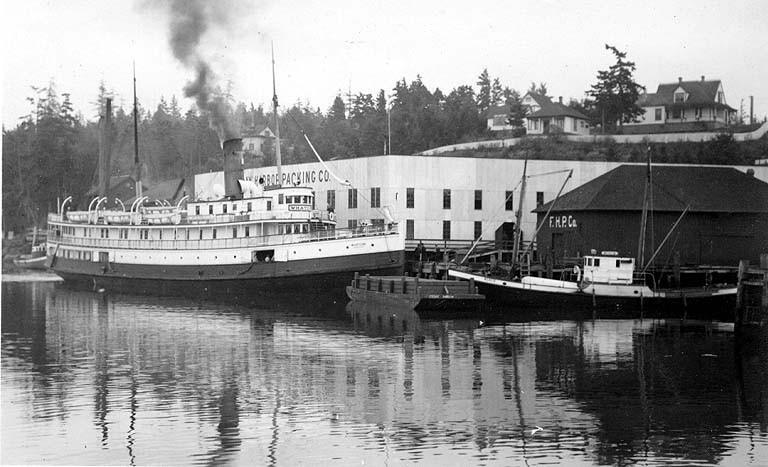
Friday Harbor Packing Co. salmon cannery Friday Harbor and Puget Sound Navigation Co.'s steamer Whatcom at dock, 1915

In 1845 the Hudson's Bay Company laid claim to San Juan Island. In 1850 they built a salmon curing station. A few years later they started a sheep farm.

The town's name originates from Joseph Poalie Friday, a native Hawaiian. Friday worked at the Puget Sound Agricultural Company's Fort Cowlitz, from 1841 to 1859–60 and later moved north to San Juan Island, raising and herding sheep around the harbor.

After the peaceful settlement obtained following the Pig War, the San Juan Islands became a separate county in 1873. Friday Harbor was named the county seat. Friday Harbor was officially incorporated on February 10, 1909. It remains the only incorporated town in the San Juan Islands.

Sailing ships, and later, the steamships of the Puget Sound Mosquito Fleet, visited the harbor on a regular basis hauling passengers, mail and freight. Freight from the island would include apples, pears, cherries, strawberries, peas, cream, eggs, chickens, grain, salmon, and lime. All were produced on or around San Juan Island. The Great Depression, World War II, the pea weevil, and competition from Eastern Washington growers brought about the decline of traditional island industries, diminishing Friday Harbor's export trade. The 1970s brought new industries – tourism, retirement, real estate, and construction. Today, Friday Harbor is again busy and prosperous.

Osamu Shimomura harvested jellyfish from the docks of the harbor. Eventually he purified the proteins that allow the jellyfish to fluoresce green when exposed to blue light. One of them, green fluorescent protein, is now widely used as a marker of molecular activity.

== Geography and climate ==
Friday Harbor is located on the east side of San Juan Island facing the San Juan Channel. According to the United States Census Bureau, the town has a total area of 2.16 square miles (5.59 km^{2}), of which, 2.09 square miles (5.41 km^{2}) is land and 0.07 square miles (0.18 km^{2}) is water.

Friday Harbor has a Mediterranean climate (Köppen Csb) with warm dry summers and damp chilly winters. It lies in a rain shadow which is formed by the Vancouver Island Ranges to the west and the Olympic Mountains to the southwest.

Climate data for Friday Harbor, Washington (Friday Harbor Airport), 1991–2020 normals, extremes 1998–present
Month	Jan	Feb	Mar	Apr	May	Jun	Jul	Aug	Sep	Oct	Nov	Dec	Year
Record high °F (°C)	60 (16)	59 (15)	71 (22)	79 (26)	98 (37)	101 (38)	97 (36)	93 (34)	89 (32)	76 (24)	66 (19)	58 (14)	101 (38)
Mean maximum °F (°C)	53.9 (12.2)	54.9 (12.7)	61.7 (16.5)	68.0 (20.0)	76.1 (24.5)	80.9 (27.2)	86.3 (30.2)	85.2 (29.6)	80.3 (26.8)	66.5 (19.2)	59.6 (15.3)	53.9 (12.2)	89.3 (31.8)
Mean daily maximum °F (°C)	47.1 (8.4)	48.5 (9.2)	52.6 (11.4)	57.4 (14.1)	63.7 (17.6)	68.4 (20.2)	72.4 (22.4)	73.3 (22.9)	68.1 (20.1)	58.5 (14.7)	51.0 (10.6)	46.3 (7.9)	58.9 (15.0)
Daily mean °F (°C)	42.1 (5.6)	42.5 (5.8)	45.5 (7.5)	49.1 (9.5)	54.0 (12.2)	58.2 (14.6)	61.2 (16.2)	61.6 (16.4)	58.0 (14.4)	51.2 (10.7)	45.4 (7.4)	41.6 (5.3)	50.9 (10.5)
Mean daily minimum °F (°C)	37.1 (2.8)	36.5 (2.5)	38.4 (3.6)	40.7 (4.8)	44.3 (6.8)	48.1 (8.9)	50.0 (10.0)	50.0 (10.0)	47.9 (8.8)	44.0 (6.7)	39.8 (4.3)	36.8 (2.7)	42.8 (6.0)
Mean minimum °F (°C)	24.2 (−4.3)	25.3 (−3.7)	27.9 (−2.3)	32.3 (0.2)	36.0 (2.2)	41.0 (5.0)	44.2 (6.8)	44.6 (7.0)	41.2 (5.1)	33.7 (0.9)	26.3 (−3.2)	22.9 (−5.1)	18.1 (−7.7)
Record low °F (°C)	11 (−12)	17 (−8)	19 (−7)	27 (−3)	30 (−1)	36 (2)	40 (4)	42 (6)	36 (2)	26 (−3)	12 (−11)	8 (−13)	8 (−13)
Average precipitation inches (mm)	2.69 (68)	1.54 (39)	1.35 (34)	1.01 (26)	1.14 (29)	0.75 (19)	0.48 (12)	0.70 (18)	1.04 (26)	2.34 (59)	2.98 (76)	2.45 (62)	18.47 (468)
Average precipitation days (≥ 0.01 in)	16.7	13.8	14.3	10.3	9.6	7.5	5.0	7.7	11.8	15.2	16.3	15.9	144.1
Source 1: NOAA
Source 2: National Weather Service (mean maxima/minima 2006–2020)

== Demographics ==
Historical population
Census	Pop.	Note	%±
1910	400		—
1920	522		30.5%
1930	601		15.1%
1940	658		9.5%
1950	783		19.0%
1960	706		−9.8%
1970	803		13.7%
1980	1,200		49.4%
1990	1,492		24.3%
2000	1,989		33.3%
2010	2,162		8.7%
2020	2,613		20.9%
U.S. Decennial Census; 2020 Census

=== 2010 census ===
As of the 2010 census, there were 2,162 people, 1,015 households, and 481 families residing in the town. The population density was 1,034.4 inhabitants per square mile (399.4/km^{2}). There were 1,273 housing units at an average density of 609.1 per square mile (235.2/km^{2}). The racial makeup of the town was 83.1% White, 0.3% African American, 0.5% Native American, 2.0% Asian, 0.1% Pacific Islander, 10.9% from other races, and 3.1% from two or more races. Hispanic or Latino of any race were 15.9% of the population.

There were 1,015 households, of which 27.3% had children under the age of 18 living with them, 30.2% were married couples living together, 12.0% had a female householder with no husband present, 5.1% had a male householder with no wife present, and 52.6% were non-families. 46.0% of all households were made up of individuals, and 17.7% had someone living alone who was 65 years of age or older. The average household size was 2.05 and the average family size was 2.88.

The median age in the town was 41.3 years. 22.6% of residents were under the age of 18; 8.5% were between the ages of 18 and 24; 23.2% were from 25 to 44; 28.7% were from 45 to 64; and 17% were 65 years of age or older. The gender makeup of the town was 47.2% male and 52.8% female.

=== 2000 census ===
As of the 2000 census, there were 1,989 people, 896 households, and 468 families residing in the town. The population density was 1,467.7 people per square mile (564.7/km^{2}). There were 1,053 housing units at an average density of 777.0 per square mile (298.9/km^{2}). The racial makeup of the town was 92.01% White, 0.65% African American, 1.31% Native American, 1.41% Asian, 0.20% Pacific Islander, 2.61% from other races, and 1.81% from two or more races. Hispanic or Latino of any race were 5.23% of the population.

There were 896 households, out of which 28.6% had children under the age of 18 living with them, 34.6% were married couples living together, 12.5% had a female householder with no husband present, and 47.7% were non-families. 38.8% of all households were made up of individuals, and 13.6% had someone living alone who was 65 years of age or older. The average household size was 2.13 and the average family size was 2.81.

In the town, the age distribution of the population shows 23.1% under the age of 18, 7.0% from 18 to 24, 26.5% from 25 to 44, 25.7% from 45 to 64, and 17.6% who were 65 years of age or older. The median age was 41 years. For every 100 females, there were 84.0 males. For every 100 females age 18 and over, there were 78.4 males.

The median income for a household in the town was $35,139, and the median income for a family was $45,208. Males had a median income of $35,625 versus $24,741 for females. The per capita income for the town was $19,792. About 7.7% of families and 12.0% of the population were below the poverty line, including 13.2% of those under age 18 and 6.0% of those age 65 or over.

== Arts and culture ==
Friday Harbor is the home to various, popular sculptures around the island. One of these is a statue of the very popular harbor seal, Popeye. The statue stands in Fairweather Park as an honor to the seal. Located in that same park is another statue made in the style of coastal Salish Native Americans. The art piece is titled Interaction, created by the artist Susan A. Point. The art is meant as a representation of the relationship between nature and people. Friday Harbor was also the home base for the Sea Shepherd Conservation Society, where president and founder Paul Watson lived.

== Transportation ==
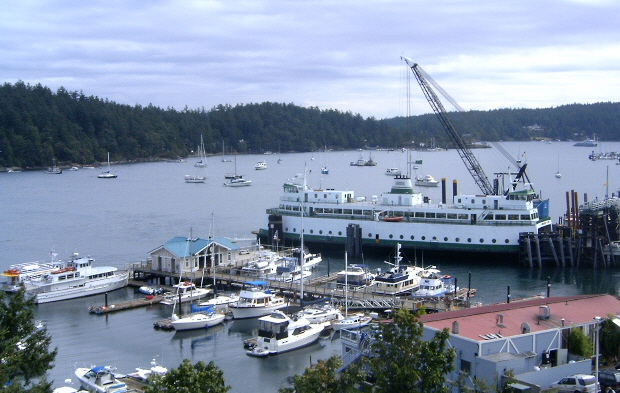
A passenger ferry at Friday Harbor's dock

Friday Harbor's primary connection to the mainland is via the San Juan Islands ferry operated by Washington State Ferries, which sail between the town and Anacortes several times per day. An international extension of the route to Sidney, British Columbia, ran seasonally from May to October until it was discontinued in March 2020 due to the COVID-19 pandemic and shutdown of cross-border traffic. The Sidney ferry is not expected to resume until 2030 at the earliest due to low demand and a staff shortage. Seasonal passenger ferry service by private operators is available from Bellingham, Port Townsend, and Seattle to Friday Harbor.

On San Juan Island, there are taxis, seasonal shuttles, bicycles, and mopeds for rent. The San Juan Transit system connects Friday Harbor to other areas of the island, including tourist destinations, with year-round service. It launched in 1993.

The Friday Harbor Airport features limited airline service. The midtown Friday Harbor Seaplane Base is also served by regular daily floatplane scheduled services from the downtown pier to Seattle's Lake Union seaplane terminal or the South tip of Lake Washington at Renton Municipal Airport with Friday Harbor Seaplanes. Kenmore Air provides daily service to Friday Harbor from its headquarters in Kenmore, Washington at the head of Lake Washington.

== Education ==
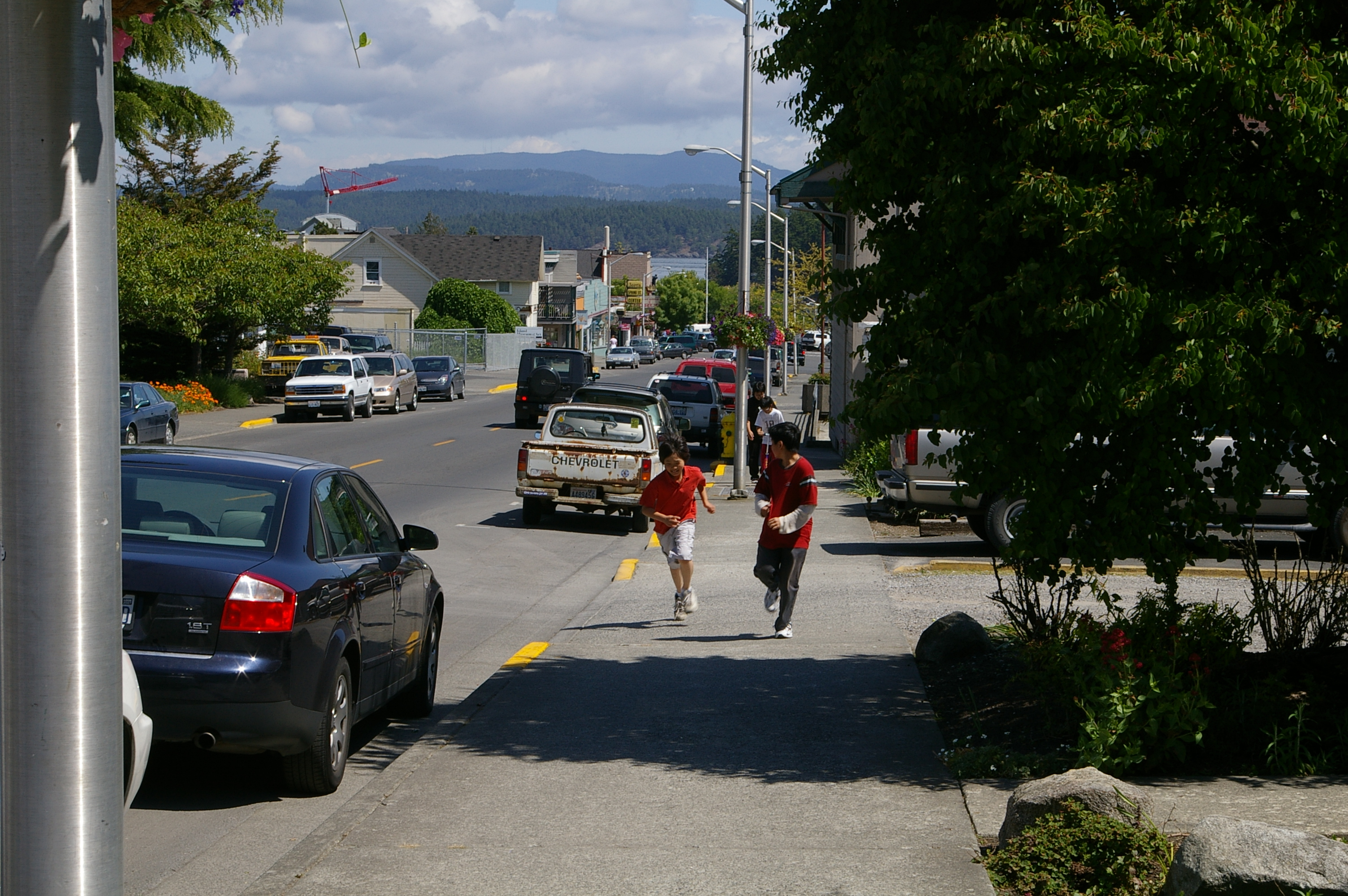
Children playing on Spring Street

The town is served by the San Juan Island School District. Friday Harbor has several schools, including the public Friday Harbor High School, Friday Harbor Middle School, and Friday Harbor Elementary School that are part of the San Juan Island School District; and three private schools: Stillpoint School, Paideia Classical School, and Spring Street International School. Also on the island is a branch of Skagit Valley College. The school district once included the Stuart Island Elementary School that was established in 1897 and was one of Washington's "remote and necessary" schools before closing in 2013.

The town of Friday Harbor houses the world-famous marine biology facility, Friday Harbor Laboratories, a field station of the University of Washington.

== Sister cities ==
Friday Harbor has the following sister cities:

- Terschelling, Netherlands
- Vela Luka, Croatia (shared with Anacortes)

== In popular culture ==
Friday Harbor has also been seen in several films including Practical Magic, Free Willy 2: The Adventure Home, Pirate for the Sea, and Namu, the Killer Whale. The 2012 Hallmark Film called Christmas with Holly is the TV-movie adaptation of Christmas Eve at Friday Harbor, the first book in the series, and also features Friday Harbor.

== Gallery ==
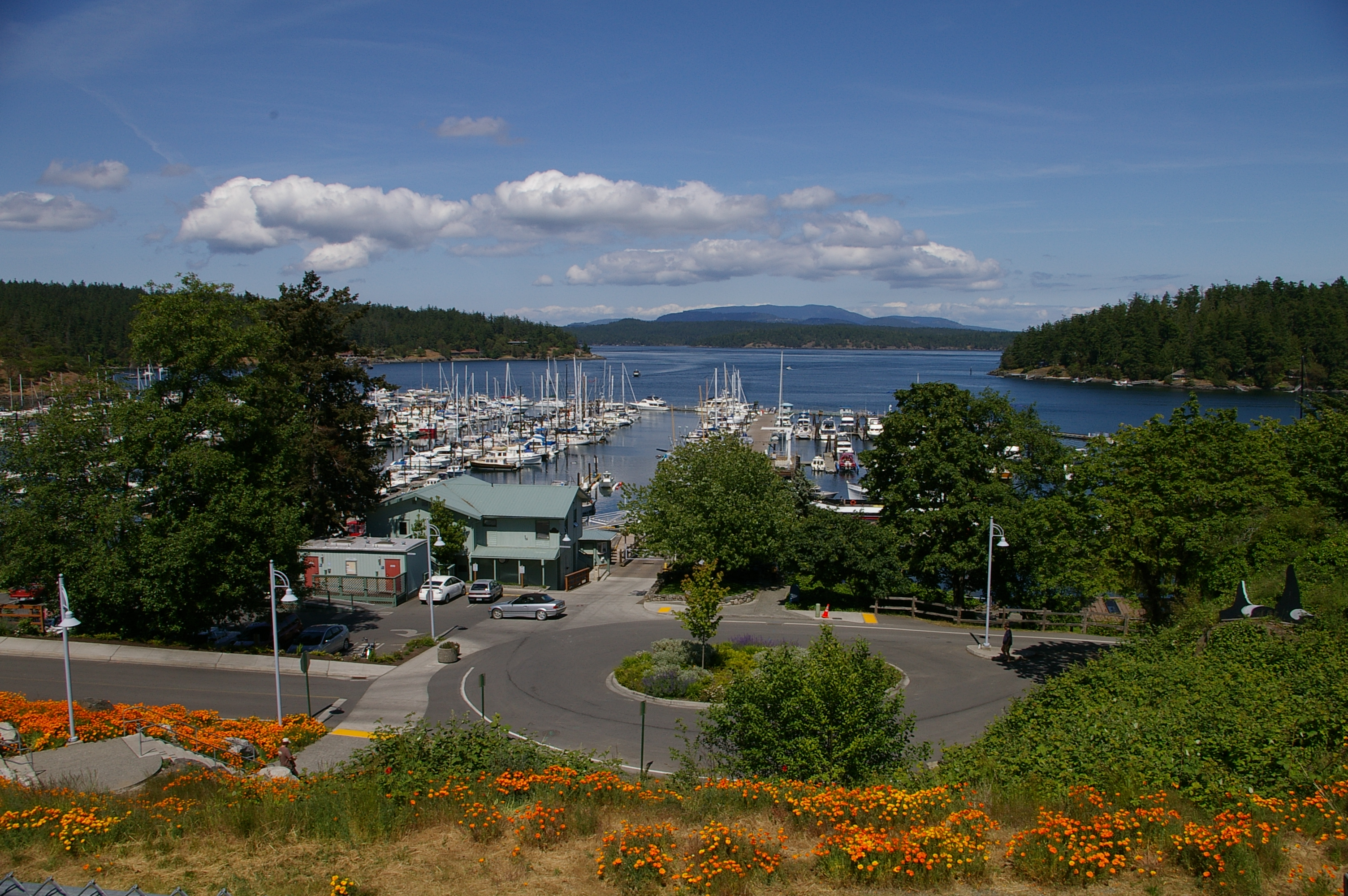
Friday Harbor

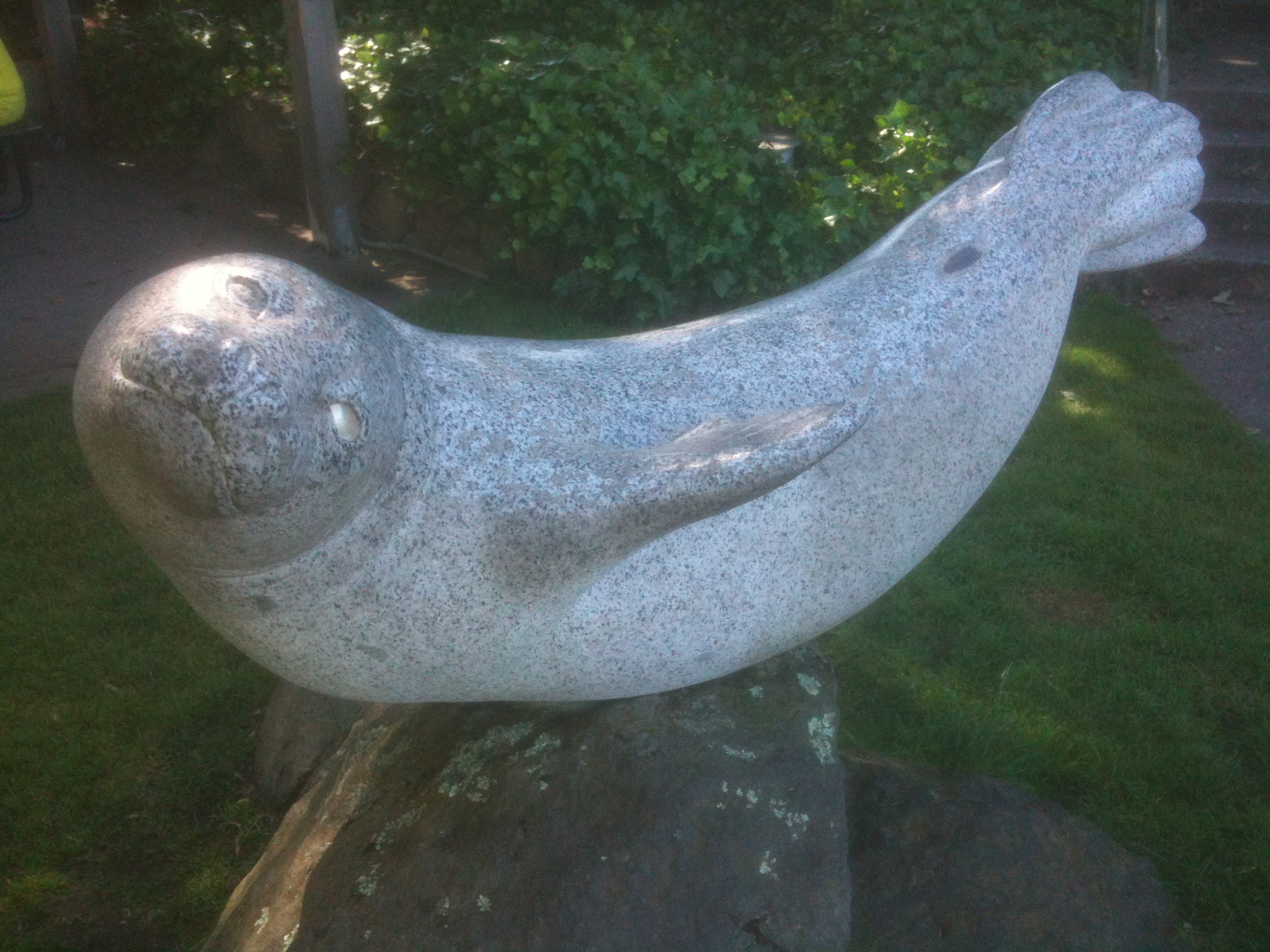
A statue of a seal named Popeye in Fairweather Park

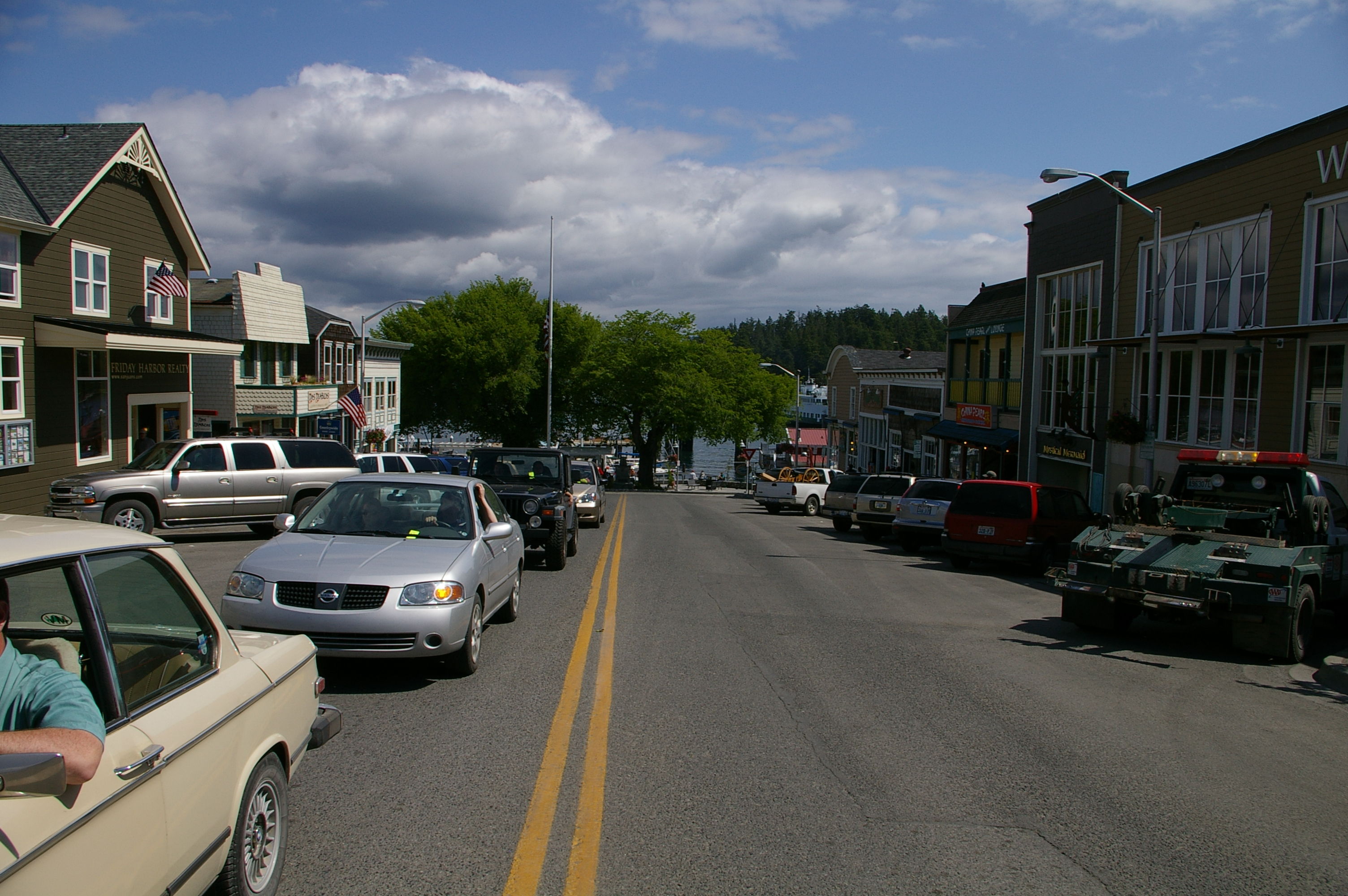
Spring Street and harbor

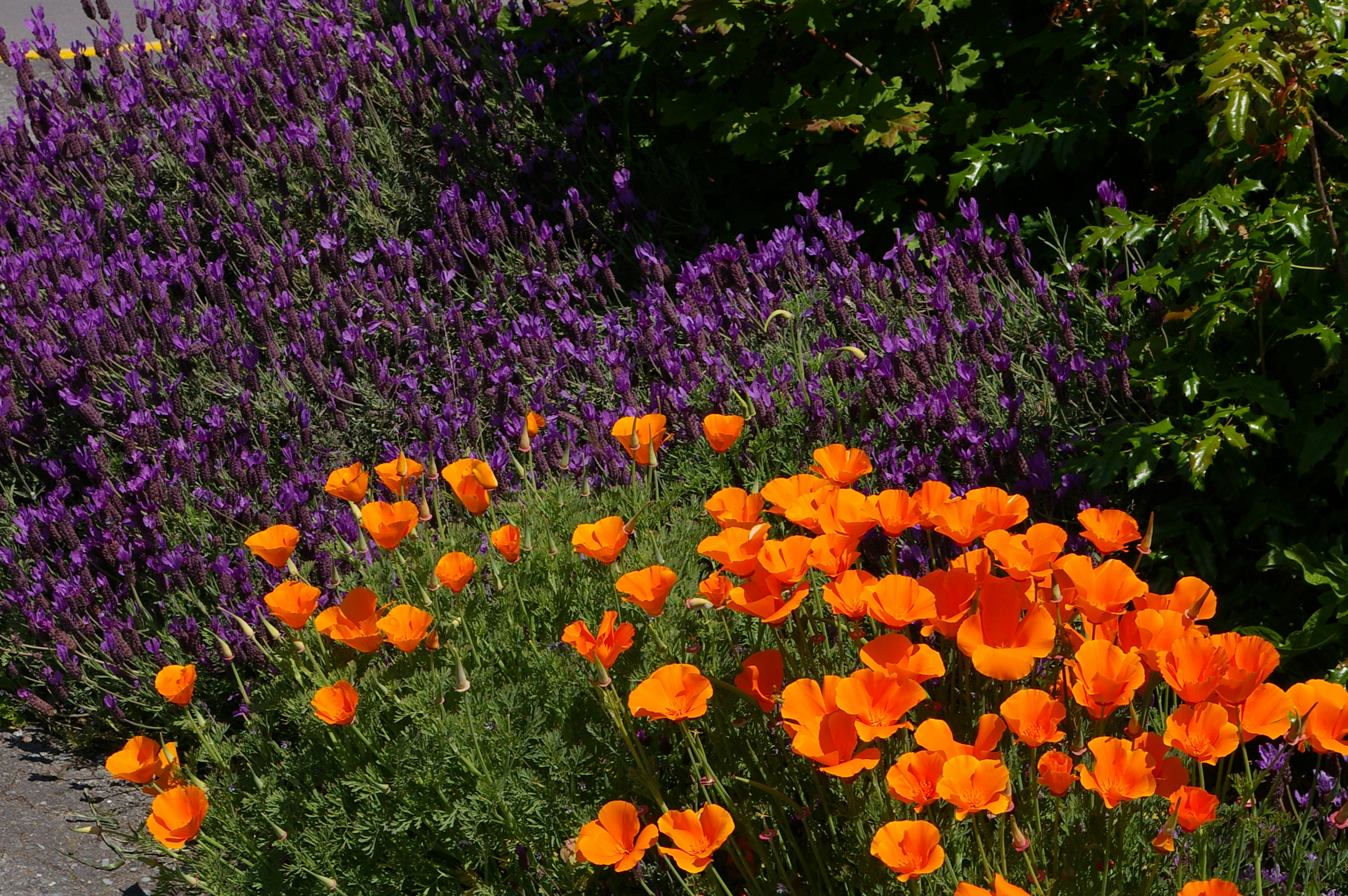
Friday Harbor's landscaping is rich with lavender and California poppies.

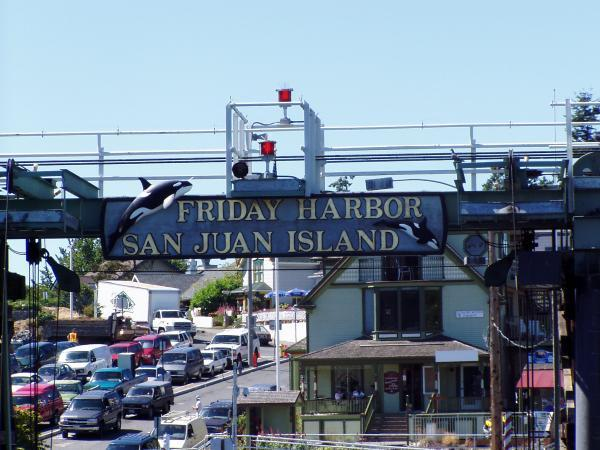
Cars at the entrance to the ferry terminal

Downtown

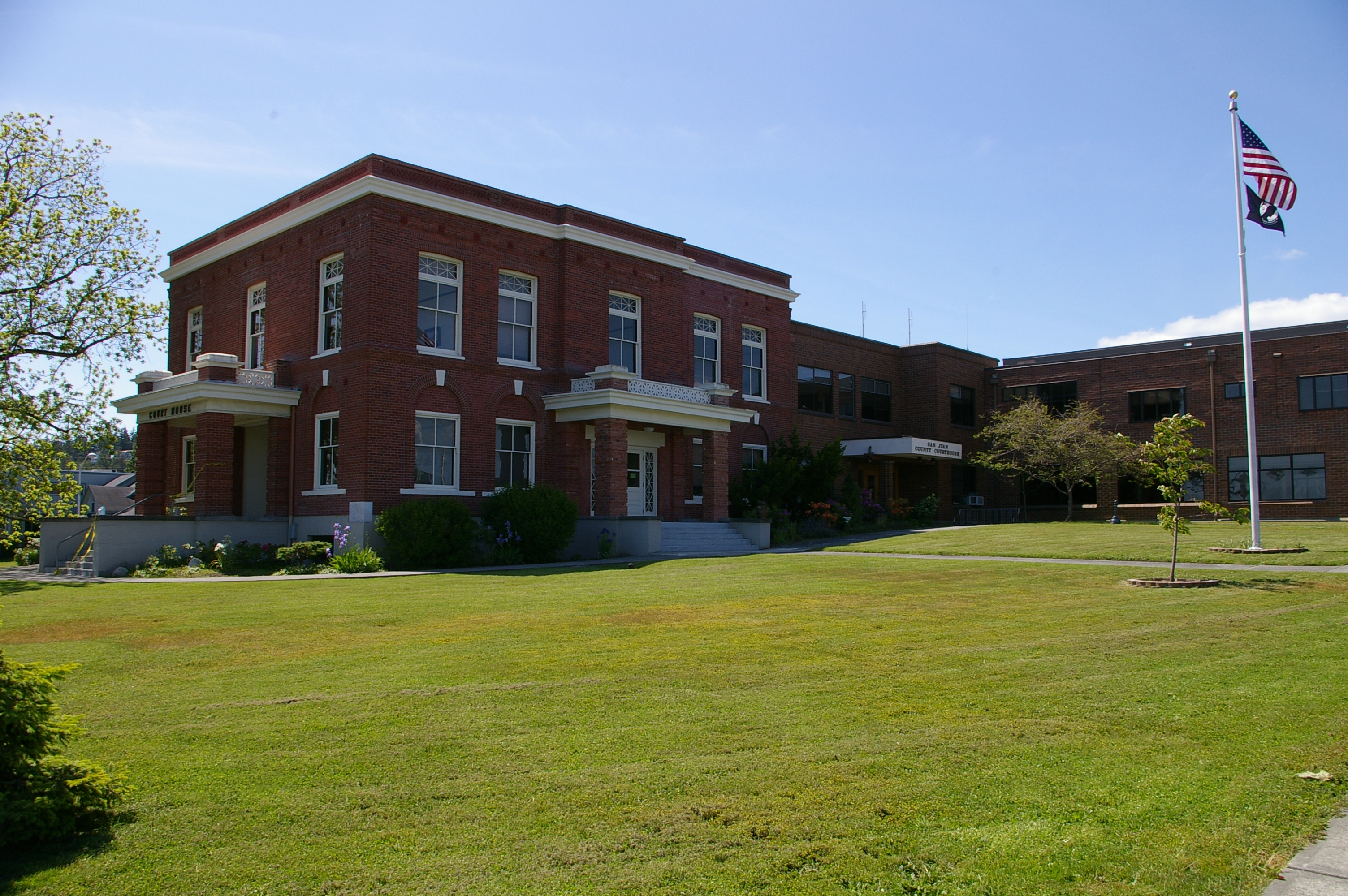
San Juan County District Courthouse

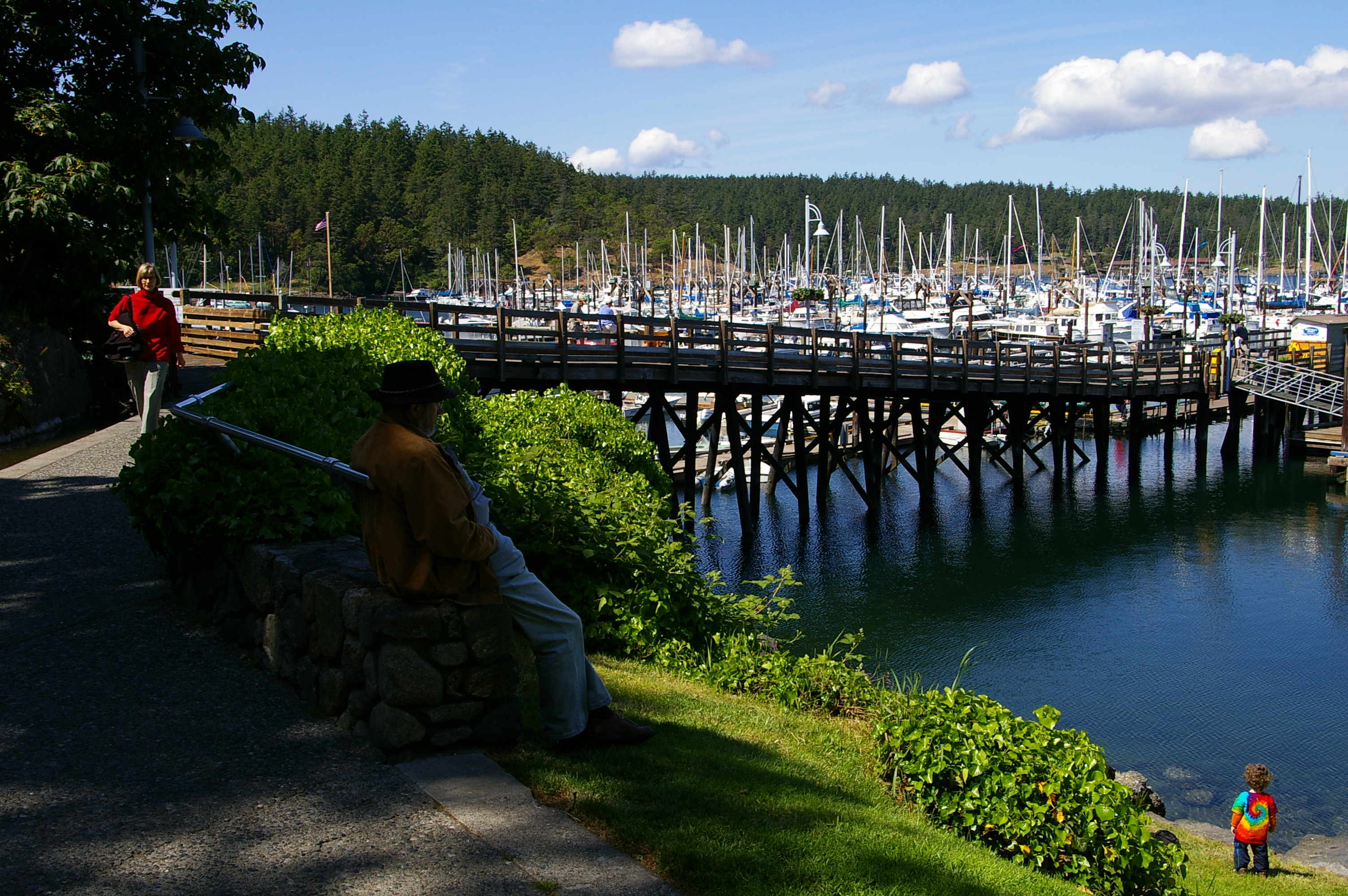
Marina in Friday Harbor
