= Popeye (seal) =

Individual harbor seal in San Juan Island, Washington

Popeye is the name of a female harbor seal that frequently appeared in the marina of Friday Harbor on San Juan Island, Washington, between the mid-1990s and the late 2010s. The Port of Friday Harbor named her its official seal in 2005.

== Biography ==
Popeye began frequently visiting the Friday Harbor marina around 1995, and soon became a well-known local figure; the name was derived from her conspicuously cloudy white left eye. In 2005, the Port of Friday Harbor named her the port's official seal and commissioned a granite sculpture of her, which to this day stands in Fairweather Park adjacent to the Marina. On August 1, 2017, Popeye attracted media attention when she bit a visiting tourist, which was reported as the only recorded incident of a harbor seal ever attacking a human; then-Port of Friday Harbor executive director Todd Nicholson chalked up the incident to her frustration at not being given food by visitors to the same extent as earlier; feeding wildlife is illegal according to Washington state law. She has not been seen since the late 2010s: as female harbor seals only live to the age of 25–35 years, this is presumably due to a natural death.

== Gallery ==
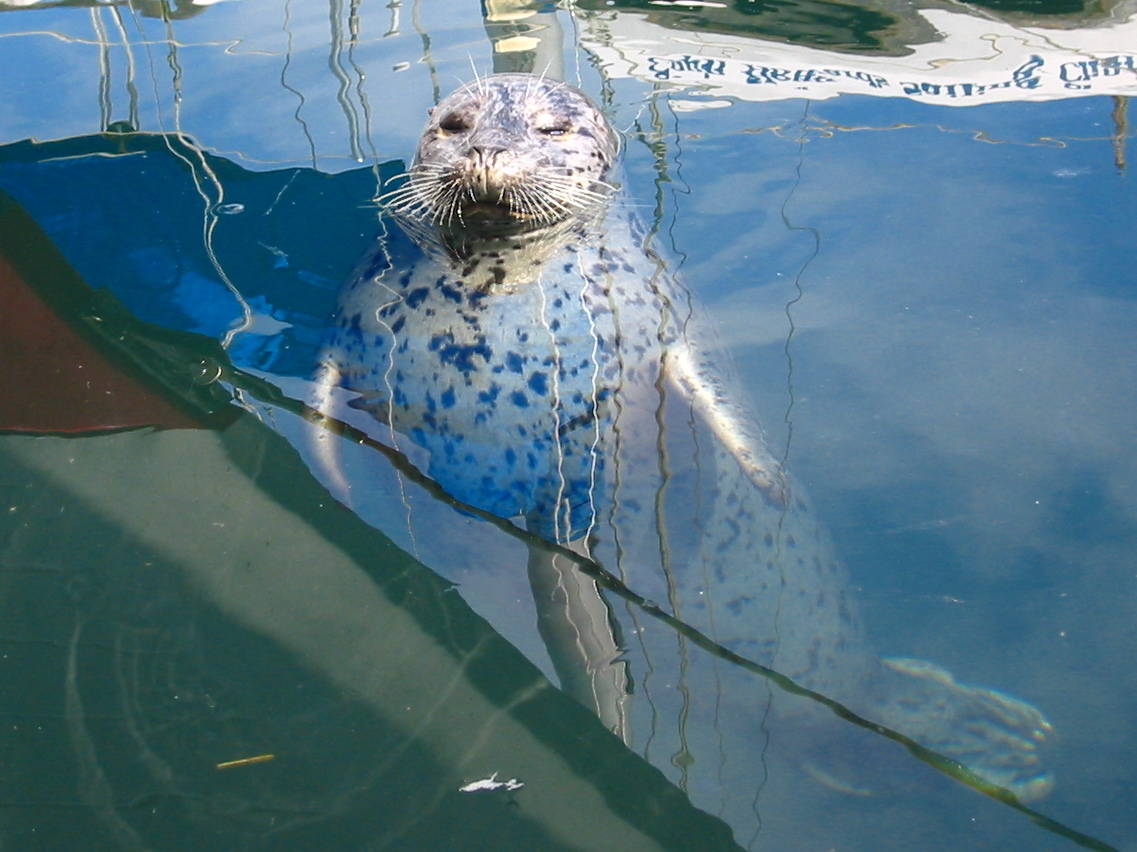
Popeye in 2005

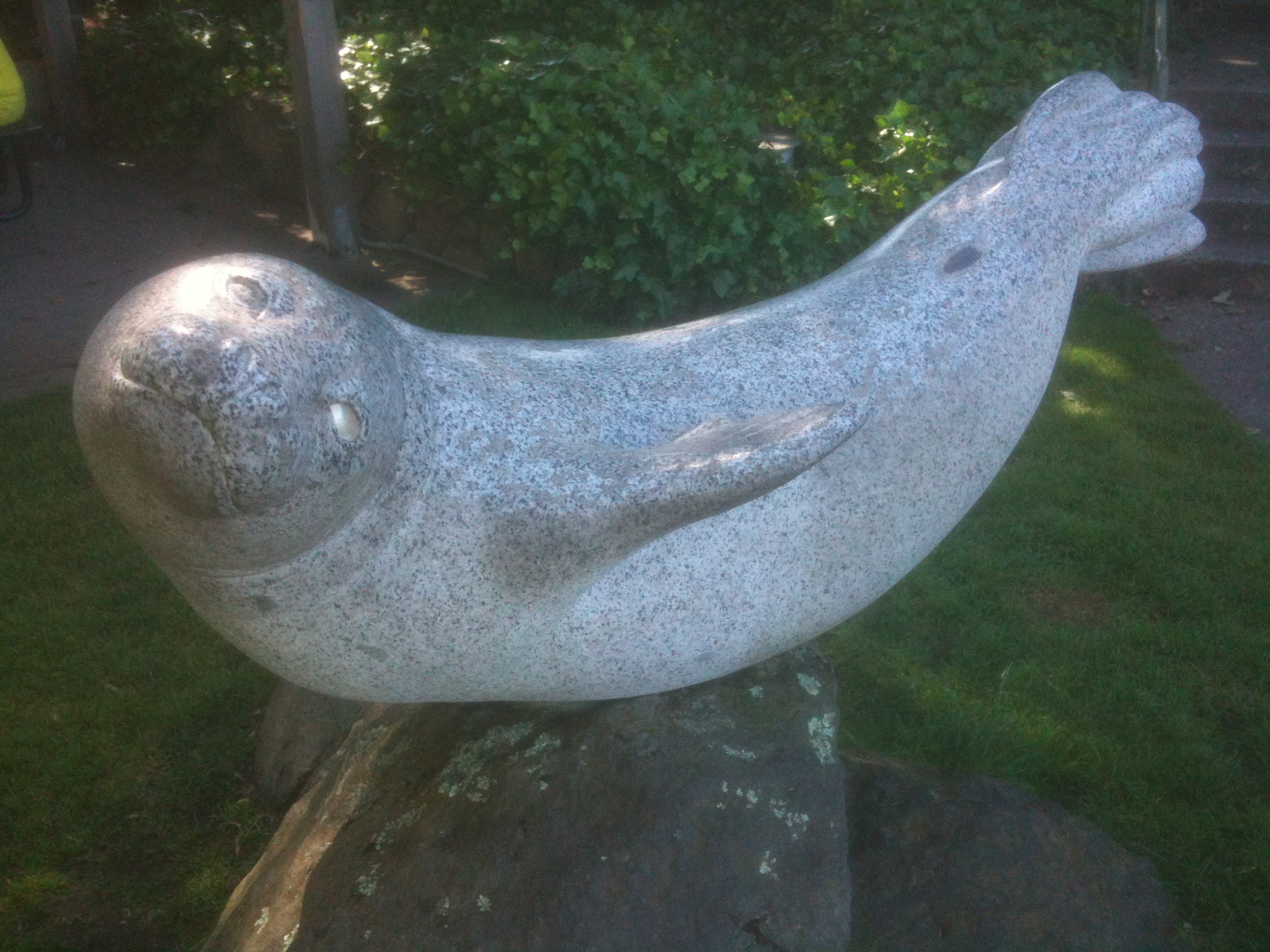
Statue of Popeye in Fairweather Park, Friday Harbor
