= Christmas Eve at Friday Harbor =

2010 novel by Lisa Kleypas

- First edition
- Author: Lisa Kleypas
- Language: English
- Series: Friday Harbor
- Genre: Contemporary romance
- Publisher: St. Martin's Press
- Publication date: 2010
- Publication place: USA
- Media type: Print (hardcover)
- Pages: 224 (1st edition)
- ISBN: 0-312-60586-2
- Followed by: Rainshadow Road

Christmas Eve at Friday Harbor is a contemporary romance by Lisa Kleypas published in 2010. It is the first novel in her Friday Harbor series, which features the Nolan family. It was adapted into the 2012 Hallmark Hall of Fame Film Christmas with Holly.

== Plot ==
Set in Friday Harbor, the novel opens with a prologue that features six-year-old Holly Nolan's letter to Santa Claus, asking for a mother for Christmas. Following the death of Holly's mother, Victoria Nolan, Holly is placed in the care of her uncle, Mark Nolan. Holly does not speak following her mother's death, until she meets Maggie Conroy, a widow and the owner of a toy store, with whom Holly develops a connection. Mark, who learns of Holly's Christmas wish, feels the need to find a mother for her. Despite being in a relationship, Mark is attracted to Maggie, while Maggie, despite her attraction to Mark, feels that she does not have enough to give to someone else since her husband's death. The novel follows the developing relationship between Maggie and Mark, as well as their relationship with Holly, culminating on Christmas Eve.

== Characters ==
- Maggie (Norris) Conroy: Owner of the Magic Mirror, a toy store. Is a widow of two years after losing her husband, Eddie, to cancer.
- Mark Nolan: Holly's uncle and legal guardian. Owner of a coffee-roasting business. Dating Shelby Daniels.
- Holly Nolan: Six years old. Does not speak following her mother's death. Wants a mother for Christmas.
- Sam Nolan: Mark's brother, who helps Mark raise Holly in his home at Rainshadow Vineyard.
- Alex Nolan: Mark and Sam's brother. Is in real estate. Married to Darcy, but decide to divorce.
- Victoria Nolan: Holly's mother who died in a car accident. Raised Holly on her own, never revealing Holly's father.
- Shelby Daniels: Interior decorator. Lives in Seattle. Dating Mark Nolan.

== Reception ==
Publishers Weekly called the book a "spritely charmer" that "avoids...all the cheesy holiday miracle cliches." It considered the book to be solid with its strong leads.

RT (Romantic Times) Book Reviews gave the book a 4.5 star rating, stating that it was "poignant, heartbreaking and deeply satisfying..."

The novel was nominated in 2010 for an RT Reviewers' Choice Award in the Contemporary Romance category.
