= Innisfil =

- Town (lower-tier)
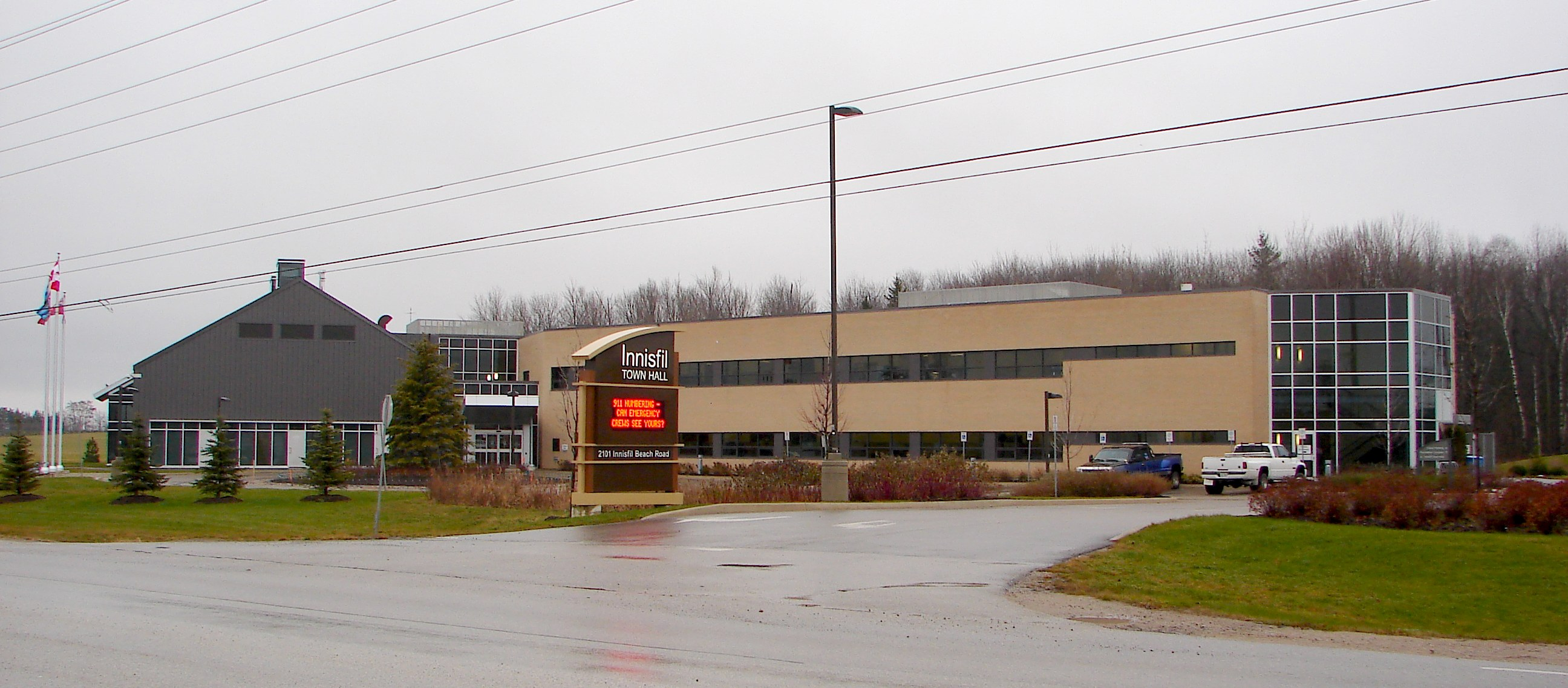
- Town hall

- Motto: Where Opportunity Meets Prosperity
- Location within Simcoe County Location within Southern Ontario
- Coordinates: 44°18′N 79°35′W
- Country: Canada
- Province: Ontario
- County: Simcoe
- Incorporated: January 1, 1991

Government
  - Mayor: Lynn Dollin
  - MP: John Brassard
  - MPP: Andrea Khanjin

Area
  - Land: 262.39 km^{2} (101.31 sq mi)
  - Urban: 23.71 km^{2} (9.15 sq mi)

Population (2021)
  - Total: 43,326
  - Density: 165.1/km^{2} (428/sq mi)
  - Urban: 29,464
  - Urban density: 1,242.5/km^{2} (3,218/sq mi)
- Time zone: UTC−5 (Eastern (EST))
  - Summer (DST): UTC−4 (EDT)
- Postal code FSA: L9S
- Website: innisfil.ca

Innisfil is a town in Ontario, Canada, located on the western shore of Lake Simcoe in Simcoe County, immediately south of Barrie and 80 kilometres (50 mi) north of Toronto. It has historically been a rural area, but since it is geographically sandwiched between the high-growth areas of Barrie and the York Region, there has been growing residential development in Innisfil.

== Etymology ==
The name Innisfil comes from the Irish Inis Fáil, an ancient mythological name for Ireland.

== History ==
The history of Innisfil spans a period in excess of 170 years. The Town was hewn from almost unbroken virgin forests which had been home to the Huron Indians, and was first surveyed in 1820. The area encompassed 68,653 acres (27,783 ha), including the villages of Allandale, Tollendal, Painswick, Minets Point, and Holly at the time.

The first settlers were the Hewson and Soules families who came by way of the East Holland River and Lake Simcoe to settle at Point Endeavour; they renamed the area Hewson's Point (later named Big Bay Point). The Hewsons settled on March 30, 1820, and the Soules in 1822. The Warnica family settled the following year, in 1823, in the area now known as Painswick. The first sawmill in the Township was built at Tollendal by George McMullen in 1829. At this time James Soules owned a sawmill on the south half of lot 26 concession fourteen (Big Bay Point), Innisfil where he made the lumber for the construction of the first frame house in Innisfil for Lewis J. Clement.

John and George Warnica completed the clearing of the bush between Barrie and Churchill. John Cayton had won the contract to open the road between Churchill and the 11th line of West Gwillimbury but only made it one mile north to the 12th, known as Cayton's Corners. Owing to his slight acquaintance with the forest, he sub-let the work to John and George Warnica who completed Cayton's contract between the 4th line of Innisfil (Churchill) and the 12th line of West Gwillimbury, north of Bradford. This opened the land route, known as Penetanguishene Road, which later became part of Yonge Street. It was later designated as a portion of Highway 11 and is now Simcoe County Road 4. This route between York (now Toronto) and Barrie was completed in the fall of 1825.

Along this road the settlers came, and spread out along the concession lines to clear the lands and develop their farms. There had been those who came ahead by way of the river and the lake; many settled near the shores of Lake Simcoe and Kempenfelt Bay. The only channels of communication were the public roads, and these were scant and poor.

The pioneer farms cut from the forest were mostly self-sustaining. What few products there were for sale found a market in nearby Barrie, which was then little more than a village. Distant York was reached in the winter when the ice and snow made for better roads.

During this period, post offices, churches, and stores were established, also a form of local government performed by commissioners was appointed under a provincial act. The first post office, then called Innisfil, was located at what is now called Barclay's Corners. The first school was built in 1838 and located at Myers Corners, later called Victoria (now the community of Stroud). The first church was also at Victoria, and was of Methodist denomination.

Milling in Innisfil was first done at Tollendal in 1835. The need for a grist mill to grind wheat is an indication of the progress toward an agricultural community.

The earliest official record of a census shows that by 1842 the population of Innisfil was 762.

=== Establishment ===
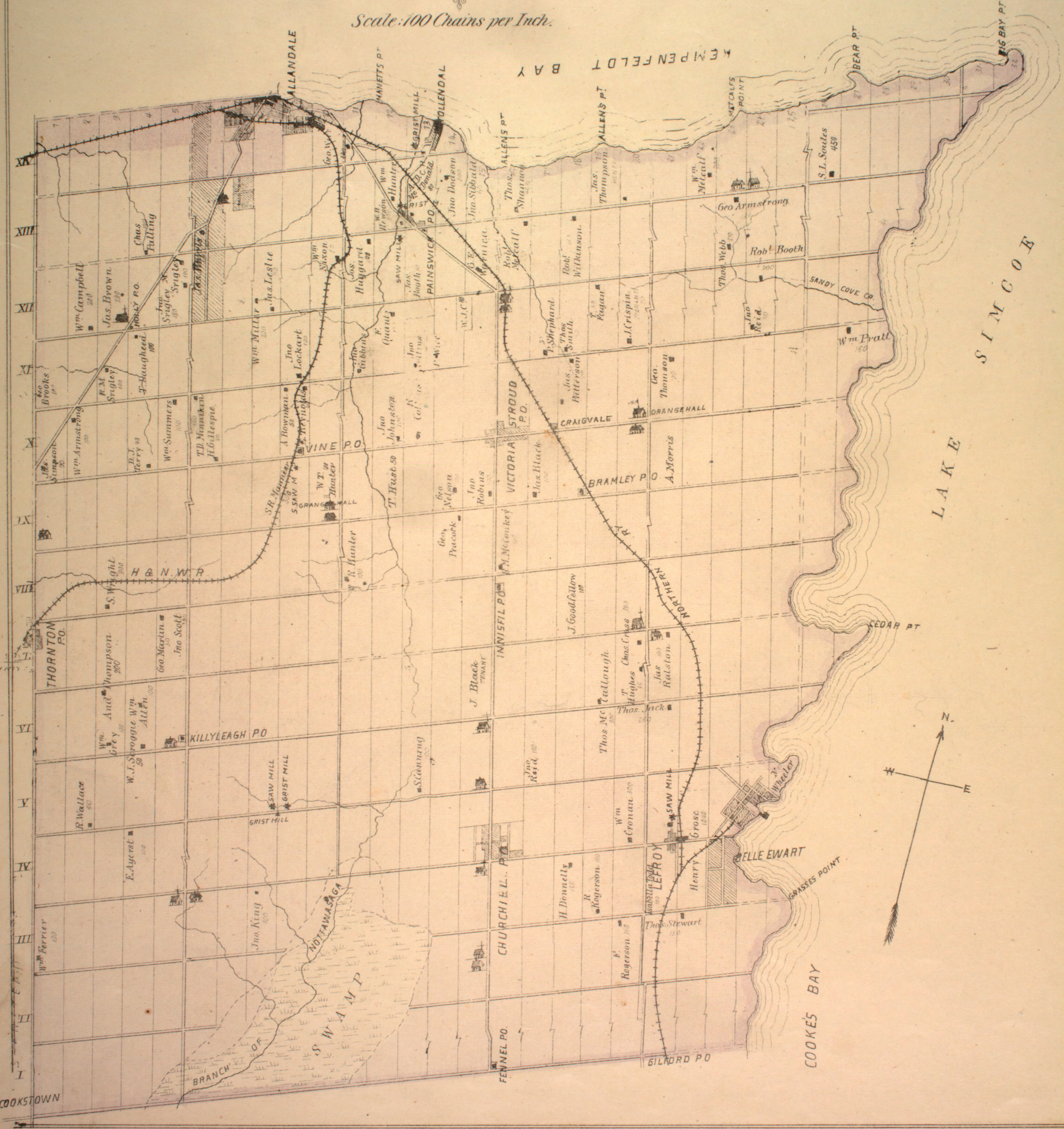
Innisfil Township, 1880

The year 1850 marked the end of the old commissioners' rule. The population had increased to 1,807, nearly tripling in under a decade. The first municipal council was established, replacing the government of appointed commissioners. The Corporation of the Township of Innisfil was born.

The settlement of Allandale became more prominent with the construction of the Ontario, Simcoe and Huron Railway (later the Northern Railway) from Toronto to Collingwood. The first train from Toronto arrived in Allandale on October 11, 1853.

The continued building of public roads, together with the railway and the lake navigation, resulted in the establishment of more flourishing hamlet settlements.

Belle Ewart was formed in 1854. Henry's Corners, now Thornton, was formed in 1833. Perry's Corners, now Cookstown, was formed around 1859. Hamlet settlement also resulted in a burgeoning resort development along the entire shoreline.

In 1891, 500 acres (200 ha) of Innisfil became incorporated as the Village of Allandale, now part of the City of Barrie. Barrie annexed a further 500 acres in 1897.

Innisfil flourished over the years and by 1950, had a population of 3,500. However, paved roads, the automobile (the first recorded in the town was 1912), the price of fuel, and the cost of housing outside Toronto, encouraged commuter residents. This, in turn, gradually changed the nature of Innisfil's shoreline development. Seasonal housing evolved to permanent residential. Now, about 90% of the shoreline is permanent residences.

=== Modern development ===
Cookstown, at the southwest extremity of the town, became an incorporated village in 1962, with 100 acres (40 ha) of Innisfil becoming part of Cookstown.

In 1967, 597 acres (242 ha) were annexed from Innisfil by the City of Barrie to accommodate the establishment of the Formosa Spring Brewery. The modern brewery was located on the northwest corner of the land, beside Ontario Highway 400, a notable landmark due to its three large and brightly coloured tanks. In 1974, the facility was purchased by Molson's and the empty land was developed into a park and concert venue known as Molson Park. Molson closed the brewery after purchasing Carling O'Keefe in 1989, moving operations to Carling's recently renovated brewery near Pearson International Airport in Toronto. Molson then sub-let the brewery buildings to other businesses while selling off the land, before the it closed entirely and forms today's Park Place.

On January 1, 1982, 8,623 acres (3,490 ha) were annexed to the City of Barrie, with a further 737 acres (298 ha) to be annexed January 1, 1987. As a result of the annexations, Innisfil's population was reduced by approximately 26.7% to 12,153 permanent residents, and its total assessment was reduced by 20.4%.

On January 1, 1991, by virtue of the South Simcoe Act, the Township of Innisfil, a northern section of the Township of West Gwillimbury, and the Village of Cookstown, were amalgamated and incorporated as the Town of Innisfil.

In 1993, the Ontario Stockyards livestock facility, located for a long time in The Junction / West Toronto area in Toronto, relocated to just east of the Cookstown town site, on Highway 89.

The County of Simcoe Act provided for further restructuring of Simcoe County on January 1, 1994, when the Village of Thornton was amalgamated with the Township of Essa and a small section of the Township of Essa, adjacent to Cookstown, was amalgamated with Innisfil.

As of 2006, Innisfil had a total permanent population of 31,175 and an estimated seasonal population of 4,000 people. Having begun as a community of seasonal homes for people living in Toronto, it is now a popular place for permanent residents, mostly families and empty-nesters and, indeed, most of the "cottages" along the lake shore have since been converted into year-round homes.

The province of Ontario enacted legislation that enabled the City of Barrie to annex 2,293 acres (9.28 km^{2}) from the Town of Innisfil on January 1, 2010. The land in question extended south beyond 10th line west of the 10th Sideroad, and as far south as Lockhart Road on the east side of the 10th Sideroad. Innisfil retained the community of Stroud, but the community of St. Pauls was shifted to Barrie.

In 2017, the mixed-use development Friday Harbour opened on Big Bay Point.

In 2019, Cortel Group proposed a long-term transit-oriented development, dubbed The Orbit, around the station with the goal of 30,000 people living in the area in the near future. Initially, the long-term goal after the development's completion was for 150,000 residents, though this has since been reduced to 90,000 residents and 20,000 jobs. That November, Innisfil Town Council approved The Orbit as Cortel committed to funding the station. In 2020, the provincial government issued a minister's zoning order (MZO) to expedite The Orbit.

== Geography ==
=== Communities ===
The town consists of the communities of:

- Alcona
- Alderslea
- Barclay
- Bear Point
- Belle Ewart
- Belle Air Beach
- Bethesda
- Big Bay Point
- Big Cedar Point
- Cedar Mount
- Churchill
- Cookstown
- De Grassi Point
- Fennell
- Gilford
- Glenhaven Beach
- Glenwood Beach
- Innisfil Heights
- Killarney Beach
- Lefroy
- Maple Grove
- Mooselanka Beach
- Nantyr
- Nantyr Park
- Sandy Cove
- Sandycove Acres
- Simcoe Beach
- Stroud

== Demographics ==
In the 2021 Census of Population conducted by Statistics Canada, Innisfil had a population of 43,326 living in 15,708 of its 17,528 total private dwellings, a change of 18.5% from its 2016 population of 36,566. With a land area of 262.39 km^{2} (101.31 sq mi), it had a population density of 165.1/km^{2} (427.7/sq mi) in 2021.

Canada census – Innisfil community profile

	2021	2016	2011
Population	43,326 (+18.5% from 2016)	36,566 (+11.7% from 2011)	32,727 (+5.0% from 2006)
Land area	262.39 km^{2} (101.31 sq mi)	262.71 km^{2} (101.43 sq mi)	284.21 km^{2} (109.73 sq mi)
Population density	165.1/km^{2} (428/sq mi)	139.2/km^{2} (361/sq mi)	110.3/km^{2} (286/sq mi)
Median age	42.0 (M: 41.2, F: 42.8)	42.4 (M: 41.9, F: 43.0)
Private dwellings	17,528 (total) 15,708 (occupied)	14,875 (total)	13,797 (total)
Median household income	$101,000	$83,516

References: 2021 2016 2011

Historical census populations – Innisfil

Year	Pop.	±%
1986	15,334	—
1991	21,667	+41.3%
1996	24,711	+14.0%
2001	28,666	+16.0%

Year	Pop.	±%
2006	31,175	+8.8%
2011	32,727	+5.0%
2016	36,566	+11.7%
2021	43,326	+18.5%

2011 Population figure based on revised count. Population counts are not adjusted for boundary changes.
Source: Statistics Canada

== Government ==
The town council is composed of the mayor, deputy mayor, and seven councillors who are elected on a ward basis. The council members are as follows, elected in the 2022 municipal election:

- Mayor: Lynn Dollin
- Deputy Mayor: Kenneth Fowler
- Councillor, Ward 1: Kevin Eisses
- Councillor, Ward 2: Grace Constantine
- Councillor, Ward 3: Jennifer Richardson
- Councillor, Ward 4: Alex Waters
- Councillor, Ward 5: Linda Zanella
- Councillor, Ward 6: Robert Saunders
- Councillor, Ward 7: Fred Drodge

The mayor and deputy mayor represent Innisfil at Council meetings of Simcoe County.

The town is part of the provincial riding of Barrie—Innisfil, represented by Andrea Khanjin of the Progressive Conservative Party of Ontario, and part of the federal riding of Barrie—Innisfil, which was introduced for the 2015 federal election, and represented by John Brassard of the Conservative Party of Canada.

Innisfil federal election results
Year	Liberal		Conservative		New Democratic		Green	
2021	27%	5,114	51%	9,775	14%	2,696	0%	0
2019	27%	5,060	48%	9,092	15%	2,844	9%	1,616

Innisfil provincial election results
Year	PC		New Democratic		Liberal		Green	
2022	54%	7,537	18%	2,432	16%	2,151	6%	862
2018	55%	8,675	25%	3,881	12%	1,822	7%	1,111

=== Policing, EMS and Fire Services ===
Policing in Innisfil is provided by the South Simcoe Police Service. Innisfil Fire and Rescue Service provides fire services in the town from 4 stations (Lefroy, Stroud, Cookstown and Innisfil) and EMS by the County of Simcoe Paramedic Services Stroud Paramedic station.

== Culture ==
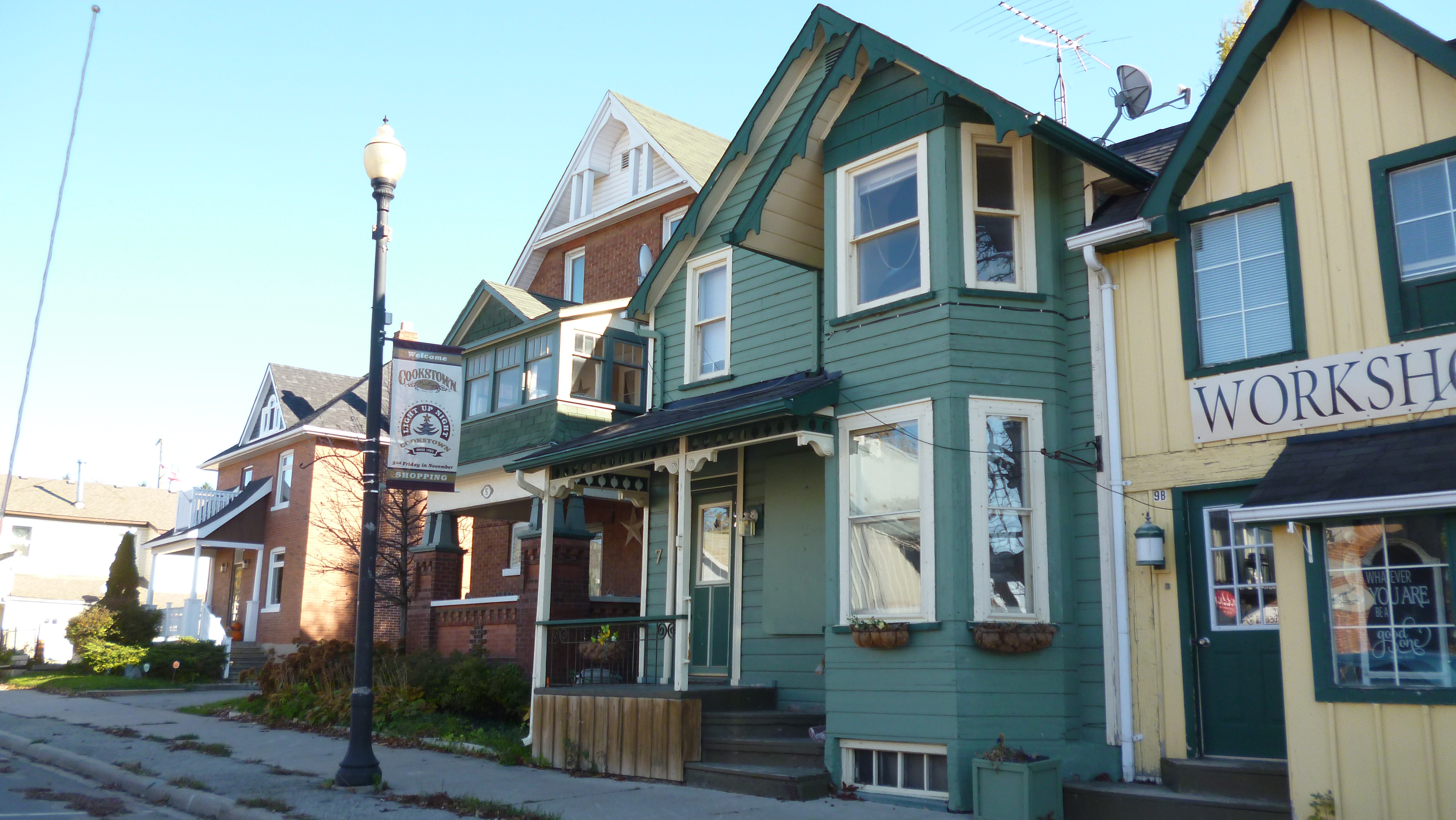
Cookstown

Cookstown is a hub of antique specialty stores and outlet shopping, and is known as the antique capital of southern Ontario. Tanger Outlets Cookstown, originally the Cookstown Manufacturers' Outlet Mall, opened in 1995. Cookstown is also known for its annual garage sale called "Wing-Ding" which occurs the first weekend of June every year. The Cookstown Fair is held annually, usually in September.

Cookstown is the birthplace of Emily Murphy, a noted Canadian women's rights activist. In 1916, she became the first woman police magistrate in Alberta, and in the British Empire. She is best known for her contributions to Canadian feminism, specifically to the question of whether women were "persons" under Canadian law.

A TV movie, Murder She Purred: A Mrs. Murphy Mystery, was filmed in Cookstown in 1998.

Alcona hosts Summerfest and Winterfest at Innisfil Beach road in the early summer and mid winter, each year at Innisfil Beach located at the end of Innisfil Beach Rd (8th Line).

Georgian Downs Harness racetrack and casino is located on the 5th Sideroad near the Highway 400 interchange at Innisfil Beach Road.

The Sunset Speedway, located on Yonge St. south of Innisfil Beach Road, has been a local landmark for over 50 years.

== Transportation ==
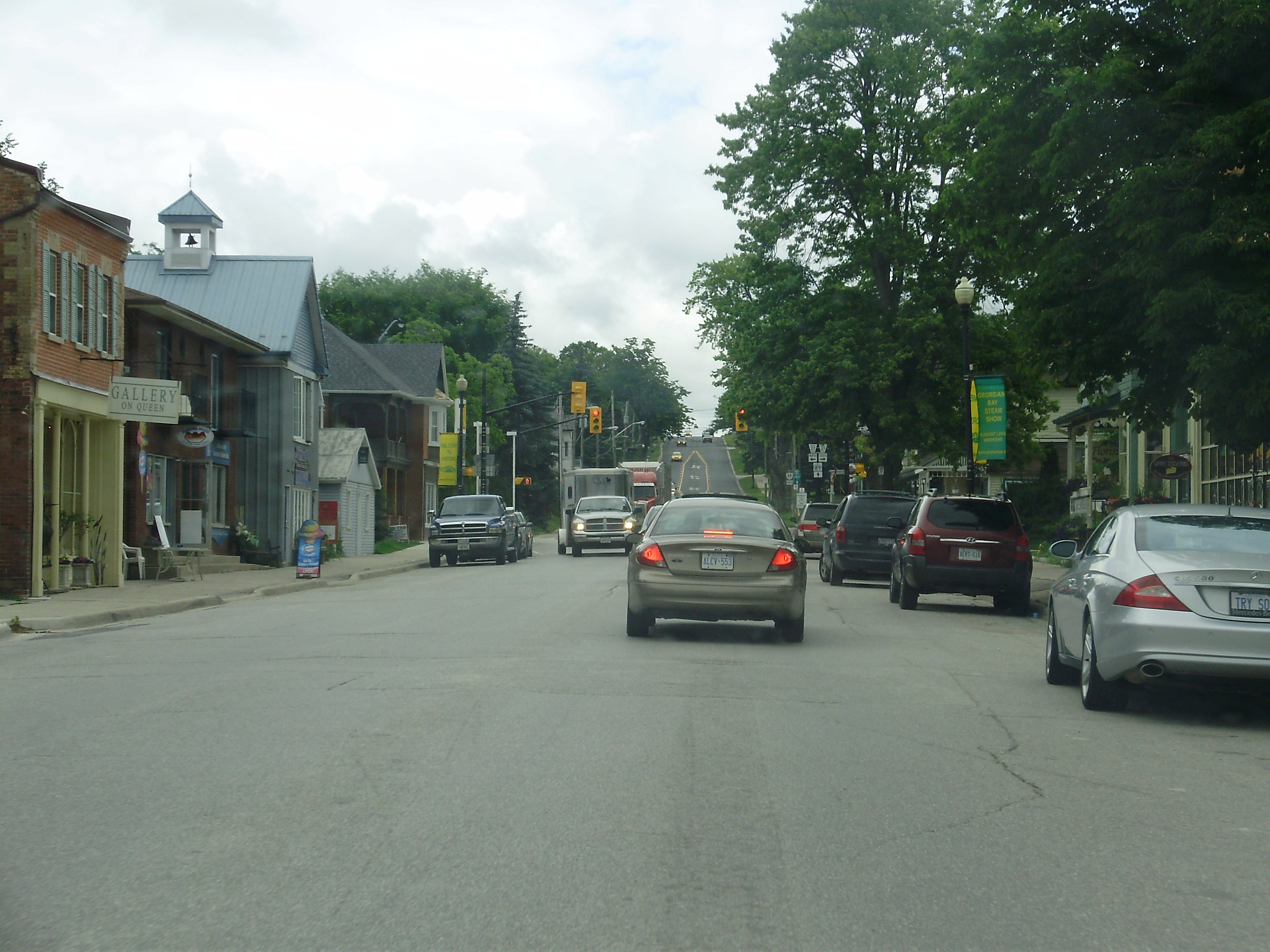
Highway 89 through Cookstown

The Barrie line of the GO Transit commuter rail system passes through Innisfil, but does not stop in the town, although a planned future station is awaiting construction. Highway 400 runs through the west side of the town and connects it to Toronto.

Innisfil signed a contract with Uber to provide subsidized microtransit service to residents in the community, in lieu of a traditional fixed-route bus service. The service began in 2017 and attracted 8,000 monthly trips in its first year, but fares were increased in 2019 due to the rising cost of the subsidy. There are flat fares of either $4 or $6 to or from certain designated community hubs, or a $4 discount off regular Uber fares for other destinations. To control costs, there is a 30-ride cap per month on flat and discounted fares, after which riders must pay regular Uber fares. However, riders dependant on the service can apply for an additional 20 subsidized trips per month.

== Notable people ==
- Stephen Emmett Clement, member of Legislative Assembly of Manitoba
- James Stoddart Duff, member of Legislative Assembly of Ontario
- Henry Albert Harper, journalist and civil servant; friend of William Lyon Mackenzie King
- Abel James Hindle, member of Legislative Assembly of Saskatchewan
- Edwin Holgate, artist, painter and engraver; "eighth" member of the Group of Seven
- Josh Leivo, NHL hockey player for the Carolina Hurricanes.
- Haughton Lennox, member of Canadian House of Commons
- Thomas Herbert Lennox, member of Legislative Assembly of Ontario and Canadian House of Commons
- William Leushner, Olympian; winner of 1 gold, 1 silver and 2 bronze medals
- Emily Murphy, women's rights activist, jurist, and author; first female magistrate in Canada, and in the British Empire
- Kate Todd, actress, singer and songwriter
- Charles Willoughby, member of Canadian House of Commons

== See also ==
- List of townships in Ontario
