= Friday Harbour (Resort) =

Mixed-use development in Ontario, Canada

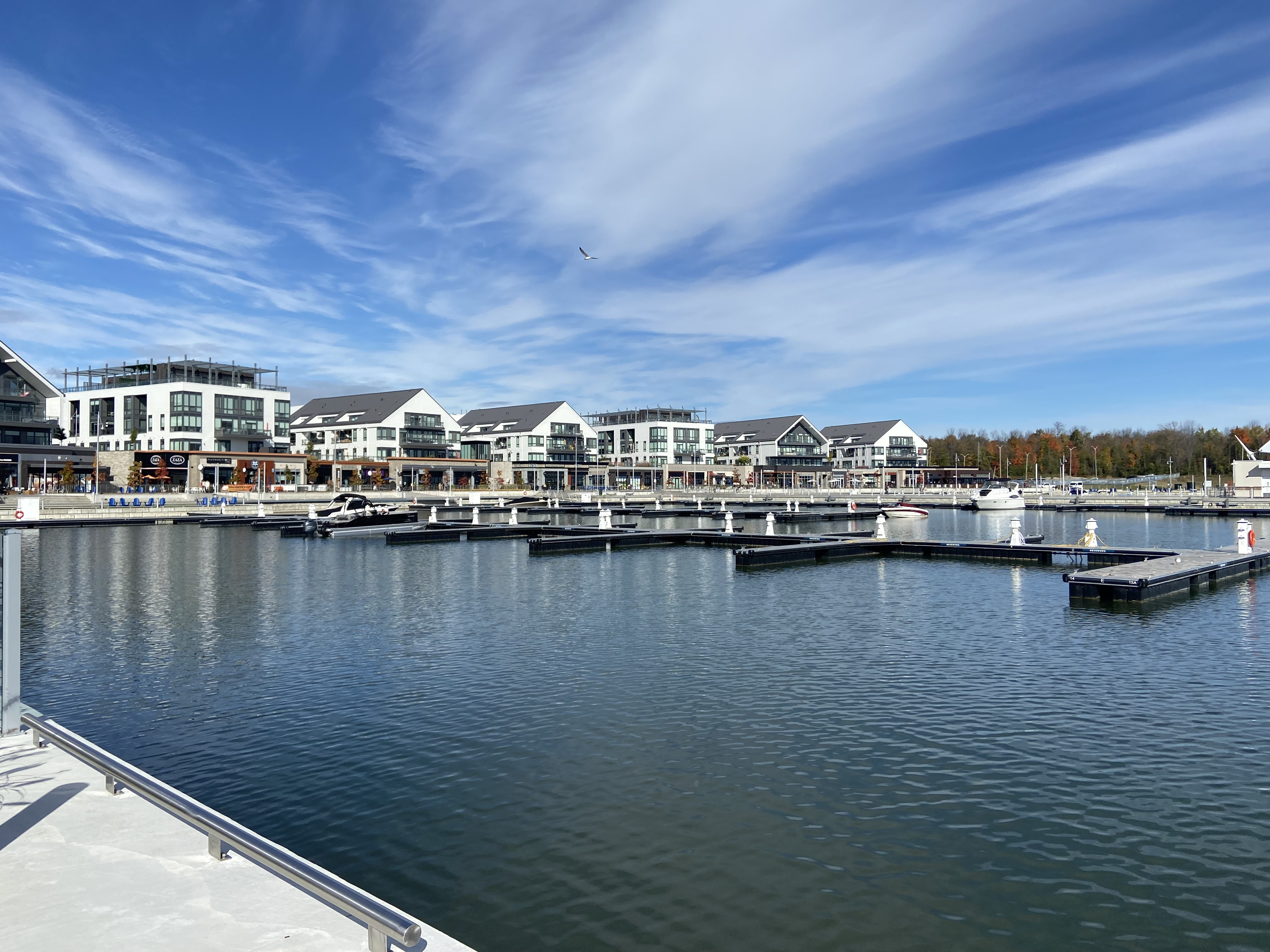

- Location within Southern Ontario
- Location: Innisfil, Ontario
- Nearest city: Barrie, Ontario and Toronto, Ontario, Canada
- Coordinates: 44°23′32″N 79°31′48″W
- Status: Operating
- Website: www.fridayharbour.com

Friday Harbour is a 600-acre mixed-use development in Innisfil, Ontario, Canada, 70 km north of Toronto. Built by the Geranium Corporation, the development contains residential, commercial, and recreational spaces, including a marina and golf course. Situated on Lake Simcoe's Big Bay Point, the resort's focal point is a 1000 slip in-land marina, the largest of its kind in Canada. Once construction is complete there will be 2600 residential units, a 400-room hotel, and a theatre.

Envisioned as a New Urbanist village, Friday Harbour was designed to be an alternative to the traditional residential offerings of Ontario's cottage country, which are typically single-family homes located on or near a body of water. In this design, the connection to the water and nature would be maintained, but the dependence on driving over walking for daily necessities would be eliminated, or greatly reduced. DPZ CoDesign, the designers of Seaside, Florida, a notable early example of a New Urbanist development in North America, were brought on to design Friday Harbour.

The first residents took occupancy in 2017, along with the opening of the first restaurants and shops on the pedestrian promenade.

== History ==
Big Bay Point, where Friday Harbour is located, first saw the arrival tourists in the 1800s. Long an area known to local indigenous population, early settlers constructed the first resort in this location, the Robinson House, in the mid-1880s. This was soon followed by the sixty-room, luxury Peninsular Park Hotel.

The front lawn of the Peninsular Park Hotel in 1910.

It become known as a popular destination for American tourists looking to experience the "wild" of the Canadian wilderness. The hotel burned down in 1955.

An inland marina called Big Bay Marina would eventually open in the area. Earl Rumm, a local resident and president of the real estate developer Geranium Corporation, brought his boat to be repaired at the marina. While there, he saw a sketch of an unrealized real estate development for the site hanging on a wall. This inspired him to pursue his own development of the Big Bay Marina. The first formal proposal for a resort at Big Bay Point was in 2002. It faced large opposition from homeowners in the area, including lawsuits.

After the development was approved by the Ontario Municipal Board in 2007, construction did not begin until 2011. Phase 1, which included the marina, nature preserve, and residential units, was completed in 2018.

== Promenade ==
The area surrounding the marina is a pedestrianized zone known as the promenade. It is made up of restaurants, shops, a homeowners clubhouse with a gym and restaurant, and a visitor centre where boaters can refuel, shower, and purchase supplies.

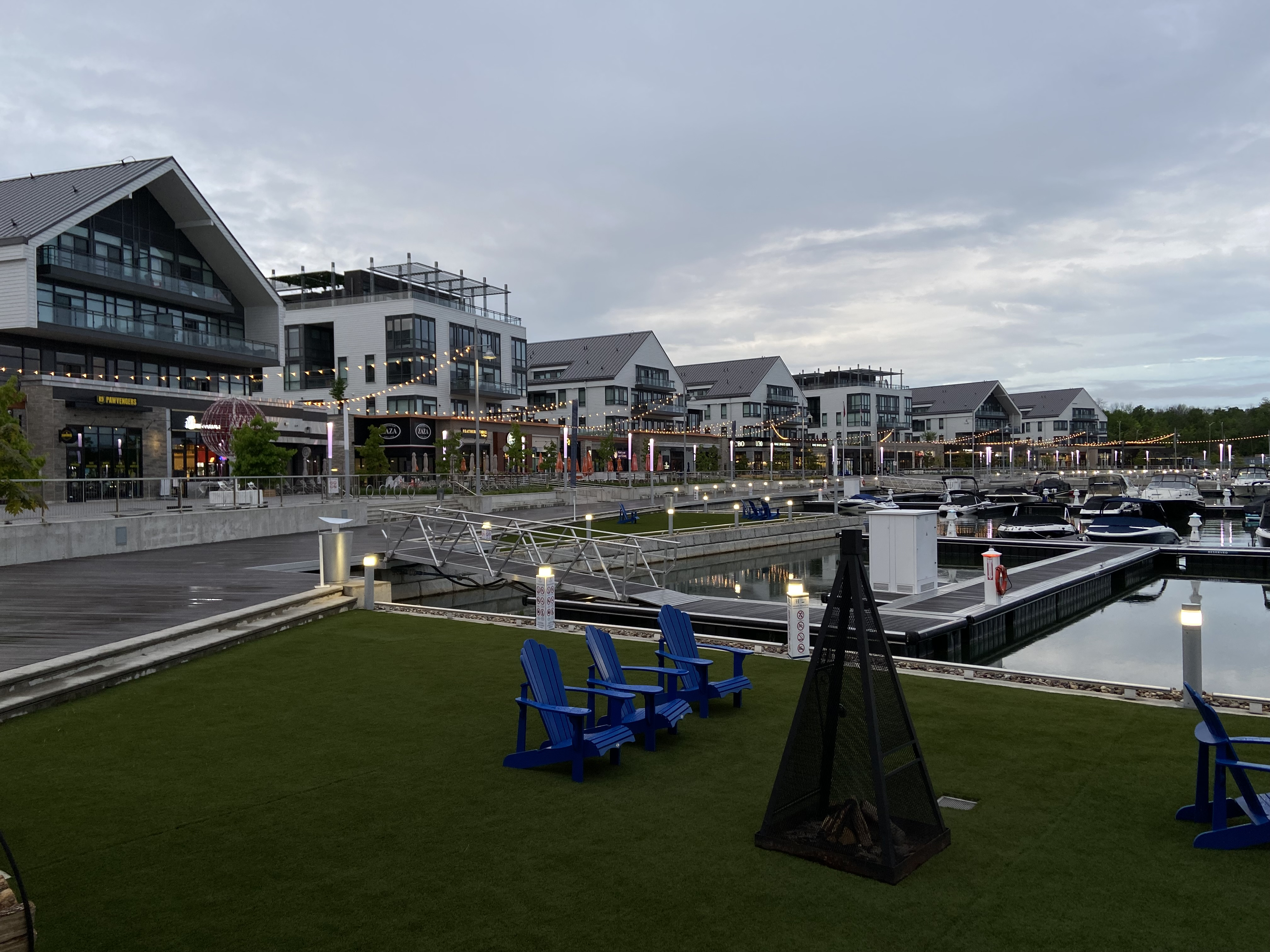
View of the promenade, a pedestrian area in the resort with shops and restaurants.

=== CIBC Pier ===
Extending outwards into the marina, CIBC Pier leads to an event space and bar where concerts and different community activities are held.

== Activities ==
Friday Harbour Resort offers a variety of activities for all seasons.

=== Winter activities ===
- Snowshoeing
- Cross country skiing
- Marina Skating
- Fat bike rentals
- Promenade holiday market

=== Summer activities ===
- The Nest golf
- Beach soccer
- Basketball
- Badminton
- Canoeing
- Kayaking
- Stand up paddleboarding

=== Year-round activities ===
- Nature trails
- Bike rentals

== Golf course ==
The Nest Golf Club
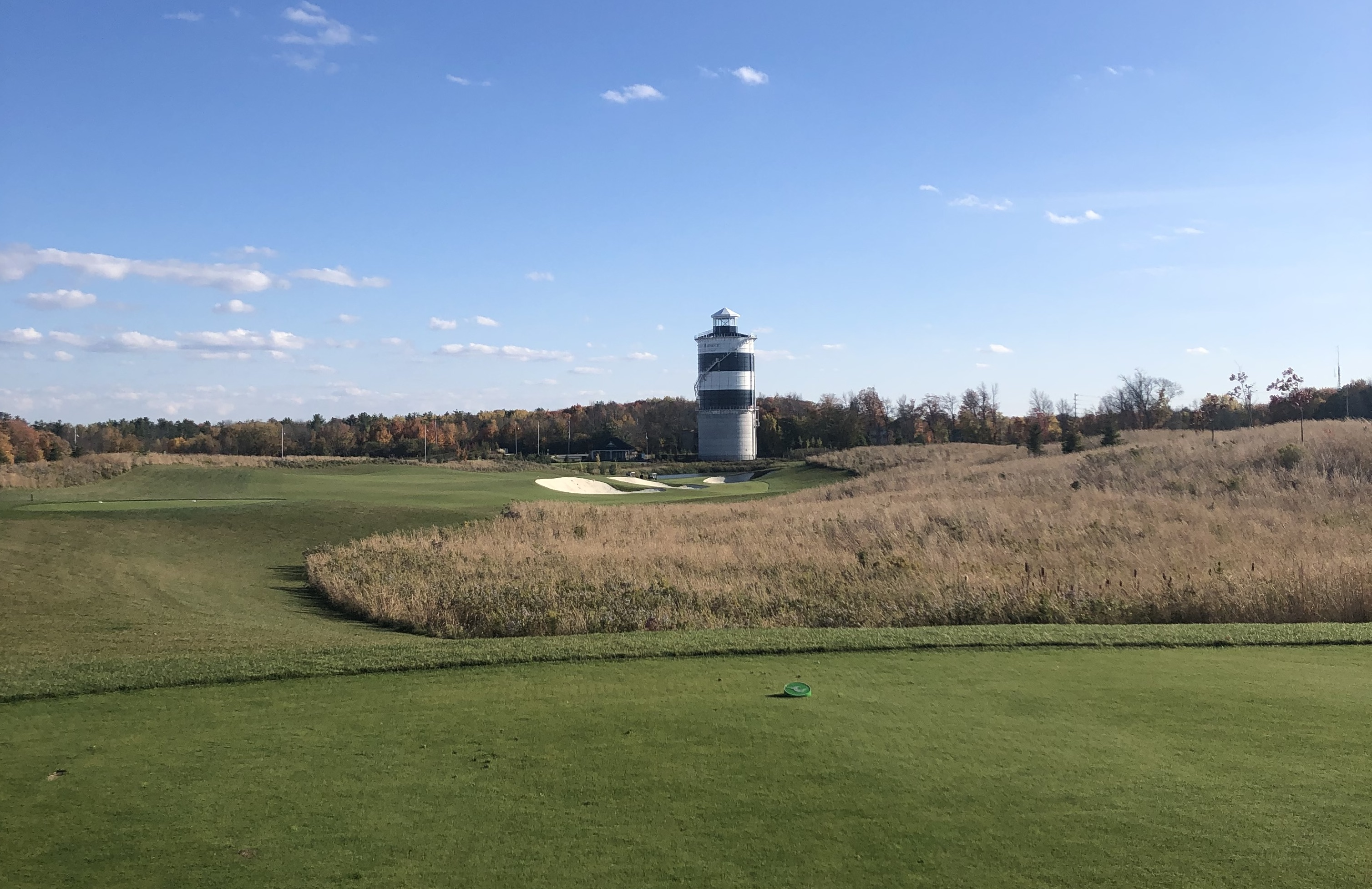
- The Nest golf course in October 2020

- Location within Southern Ontario
- 44.3838683°N 79.5461486°W

Club information
- Location: 3800 Friday Dr; Innisfil, Ontario; L9S 3E1
- Established: 2018; 8 years ago
- Type: Semi private
- Owner: Friday Harbour Resort
- Total holes: 18
- Greens: Bentgrass
- Fairways: Bentgrass
- Website: www.fridayharbour.com/golf-the-nest
- Designer: Doug Carrick
- Par: 72
- The Nest logo

Friday Harbour is home to The Nest Golf Club, an 18-hole golf course. The clubhouse features a pro shop and restaurant. During winter months, the course is open as a snowshoeing trail.

In 2019, The Nest received gold signature sanctuary certification from Audubon International for the club's work protecting the course's natural setting.

The Nest Golf Club
Tee	Rating/Slope	1	2	3	4	5	6	7	8	9	Out	10	11	12	13	14	15	16	17	18	In	Total
Black	73.6 / 131	340	145	473	381	422	558	537	206	462	3524	362	572	243	326	570	482	397	186	439	3577	7101
Gold	71.4 / 127	320	131	442	359	392	526	510	184	424	3288	338	548	215	305	540	446	367	172	415	3346	6634
Blue	69.2 / 121	292	115	430	339	359	490	476	166	396	3063	314	511	185	285	515	412	343	157	394	3116	6179
SI	Men's	9	15	3	17	11	5	1	13	7		14	4	12	18	2	6	10	16	8
Par		4	3	4	4	4	5	5	3	4	36	4	5	3	4	5	4	4	3	4	36	72
Green	66.4 / 114	281	105	402	318	280	460	466	153	326	2791	288	465	145	264	461	355	331	141	321	2771	5562
White	70.4 / 125	225	94	354	272	270	383	395	141	315	2449	228	449	134	206	442	341	254	126	309	2489	4938
SI	Ladies'	13	17	3	7	15	5	9	1	11		16	4	12	18	2	6	10	14	8
