= Lisa Kleypas =

American author (born 1964)

- Born: Lisa Annette Kleypas; November 5, 1964 (age 61); Temple, Texas, U.S.
- Education: Wellesley College – Department of Political Science
- Occupation: Novelist
- Spouse: Gregory Ellis
- Children: 2
- Writing career
- Language: English
- Period: 1987–present
- Genres: Historical romance, Contemporary romance
- Notable works: I Will from Wish List, Worth Any Price
- Notable awards: RITA award – Romance Novella; 2002 I Will from Wish List; RITA award – Short Historical Romance; 2004 Worth Any Price
- Website: lisakleypas.com

Lisa Kleypas (born November 5, 1964) is an American author of historical and contemporary romance novels. Before embarking on a literary career, she was named Miss Massachusetts 1985 and competed in the Miss America 1986 pageant in Atlantic City.

== Biography ==
Lisa Kleypas was born on November 5, 1964 in Temple, Texas, to Linda and Lloyd Kleypas, an architect. She spent her childhood between Watertown and Carlisle after her family moved to Massachusetts when she was three. Between the ages of twelve and twenty-four she lived in the Concord and Lexington area. She started writing at sixteen, during a summer camp at Wellesley College; her parents encouraged her, sending her to a writers' conference in Bretton Woods. For the next five years, Kleypas wrote a new work every summer, none of which she deemed publishable, and turned to romance novels set during the English Regency after becoming fascinated by a course on the Georgian era at Boston College. In 1986 she participated in Miss America with the Miss Massachusetts sash, after which she concentrated on her studies, graduating in political science from Wellesley College three months after selling her first novel to a publishing house.

In October 1998, Kleypas's Texas home flooded and her family lost everything except the clothes they were wearing. Her colleagues sent clothes and books. After the flood, she and her mother (whose home had also flooded), made a trip to purchase necessities. Separately, each of them also chose a romance novel, a necessity to them in helping them escape the stress they were currently under. To Kleypas, this realization validated her decision to write romance novels instead of more literary works.

Though primarily known for her historical romance novels, Kleypas made an announcement in early 2006 concerning her momentary departure from historical romances to delve into the contemporary romance genre. Her debut contemporary novel, Sugar Daddy, reached the New York Times bestsellers list.

In 2020, Kleypas was diagnosed with cancer and took a break to undergo thyroid removal surgery. As she focused on recovering, she decided to take a career risk and move slightly away from the romance genre with her comeback novel, Queen of Lombard Street: described as a historical novel rather than a romance one about a woman trying to start a women's bank in the Victorian era, it was released on October 20, 2026.

== Personal life ==
Kleypas lives in Palm Desert, California with her husband, entrepreneur Gregory Ellis. They have two children.

== Style ==
Kleypas's inspirations include Wuthering Heights and E. M. Forster, as well as her contemporary writers Laura Kinsale, Loretta Chase, and Kathleen Woodiwiss. She grew up close to Louisa May Alcott's Orchard House, which she visited often, and Little Women was the novel that made her want to become an author. In 1997, she credited Woodiwiss with inspiring her to write romance: "... I was introduced to the romance genre by Kathleen E. Woodiwiss' first book, The Flame and the Flower... This wonderful experience led me to read many other romance novels, and eventually to write my own. If it hadn't been for Kathleen's vibrantly soaring work, I might never have tried my own wings." She also believes that reading biographies enriches her as a writer, as much as reading reviews of her books, claiming that a critique of Somewhere I'll Find You which described it as "lacking urgency" "changed [her] for the better as a writer".

Kleypas's participation in beauty pageants influenced her characterization, leading her to never write physically perfect and self-confident heroines, while for the heroes of her stories she prefers a "masculine man who is able to express himself well but never speaks in flowery prose. He possesses innate strength of character and is self-made or has risen above difficult circumstances. Eventually he loves the heroine with a Heathcliff-level of intensity, and demonstrates this both verbally and physically". In her plots she often uses misfits and outsiders who try to fit in, such as non-aristocratic heroes and out-of-place heroines, who are ultimately appreciated for who they are. For romance, Kleypas believes that the two lovers should encourage each other to pursue their individual goals and that the heroine should improve as a person thanks to the presence of the hero in her life. In her novel Dreaming of You, the female protagonist "experiences an entirely different world thanks to her relationship with the hero, and is forever transformed into a new and different person. ... Moreover, Kleypas goes one step forward and depicts the hero's transformation as well, a transformation that involves his own awakening and adoption of traditional female characteristics." As her career progressed, Kleypas began to add more history into her historical romance novels: for the Ravenels series, she was inspired by the achievements of Victorian women such as inventor Elizabeth Magie and doctor Elizabeth Garrett Anderson to create female protagonists who seek professional fulfillment outside of marriage, and she consciously decided not to include the heroine expecting a child or having become a mother in the finale of Devil in Spring.

In her first novel, the female protagonist is forcefully seduced by the male protagonist, a scene that Kleypas later said "made me so uncomfortable that I had the hero being sorry and apologizing for the entire rest of the book. I have never done one since." In a 2017 interview, she recounted that at the beginning of her career "there were a lot of very sexist, misogynistic beliefs that I unconsciously had absorbed. Also my personal feeling about men, like what was attractive, what was sexy, was different then than it is now. I was very taken with the idea of being forcefully kissed and passionately carried away, and now, to me, that isn't as sexy as two intelligent, strong people challenging each other and finding out who each other are." She therefore inserted dialogues before love scenes in which the hero asks the female protagonist for consent. Her personal rules for writing historical romance novels include "no hitting ever. No physical abuse ever between the hero and heroine. ... Even in terms of verbal abuse, I have pretty strict boundaries with that, because once you feel like that respect is no longer there, if someone's willing to hurt someone to that extent, to me you can't recover from that." Some audio editions of her books have been revised and updated to make certain scenes more consensual.

She writes her contemporary novels from a first-person perspective.

== Bibliography ==
=== Historical novels ===
==== Berkley-Falkner series ====
1. Where Passion Leads (1987)
2. Forever My Love (1988)

==== Only Vallerand series ====
1. Only in Your Arms (1992), republished as When Strangers Marry (2002)
2. Only with Your Love (1992)

==== Gamblers of Craven's series ====
1. Then Came You (1993)
2. Dreaming of You (1994)
3. Against the Odds, in the anthology Where's My Hero with Julia Quinn and Kinley MacGregor (2003)

==== Stokehurst Family series ====
1. Midnight Angel (1995)
2. Prince of Dreams (1995)

==== Capitol Theatre series ====
1. Somewhere I'll Find You (1996)
2. Because You're Mine (1997)
3. I Will, in the anthology Wish List with Lisa Cach, Claudia Dain and Lynsay Sands (2001)

==== Bow-Street Runners series ====
The series features the Bow Street agents, who carried out detective investigations and served as London magistrates before the city had its own police force.

1. Someone to Watch Over Me (1999)
2. Lady Sophia's Lover (2002)
3. Worth Any Price (2003)

==== Wallflowers series ====
The series, inspired by the bond between Kleypas and her school friends and the way they supported each other when they were not asked to dance by boys, follows four young women as they help each other find husbands during the Regency era.

1. Again the Magic (2004)
2. Secrets of a Summer Night (2005)
3. It Happened One Autumn (2005)
4. Devil in Winter (2006)
5. Scandal in Spring (2006)
6. A Wallflower Christmas (2008)

==== Hathaways series ====
The novels revolve around the orphaned Hathaway family – one brother and four sisters – who suddenly inherit a peerage and a property in Hampshire. Some characters from the Wallflowers series return, and Cam Rohan from Devil in Winter is the male protagonist of the first volume.

1. Mine Till Midnight (2007)
2. Seduce Me at Sunrise (2008)
3. Tempt Me at Twilight (2009)
4. Married By Morning (2010)
5. Love In The Afternoon (2010)

The series also consists of a short story titled A Hathaway Wedding (2009), which takes place right after Seduce Me at Sunrise.

==== The Ravenels series ====
Set in the Victorian era, the series begins with a rake, Devon Ravenel, who inherits from a deceased distant relative the title of earl and a bankrupt estate, inhabited by the deceased's widow and sisters. Devil in Spring is inspired by the story of Elizabeth Magie, inventor of The Landlord's Game, the precursor to Monopoly, while the heroine of Hello Stranger, Dr. Garrett Gibson, is based on the first female British doctor, Elizabeth Garrett Anderson. Evie and Sebastian from the Wallflowers series return as extras along with their children, two of whom – Gabriel and Phoebe – are protagonists in the third and fifth volumes respectively. Devil in Disguise serves as a further crossover between the two series.

1. Cold-Hearted Rake (2015)
2. Marrying Winterborne (2016)
3. Devil in Spring (2017)
4. Hello Stranger (2018)
5. Devil's Daughter (2019)
6. Chasing Cassandra (2020)
7. Devil in Disguise (2021)

==== Standalone novels ====
- Love, Come to Me (1988)
- Give Me Tonight (1989)
- Stranger in My Arms (1998)
- Where Dreams Begin (2000)
- Suddenly You (2001)

==== Novellas ====
- Surrender, in the anthology Christmas Love Stories (1991) with Diane Wicker Davis, Shannon Drake, Kay Hooper
- Promises, in the anthology Three Weddings and a Kiss (1995) with Catherine Anderson, Loretta Chase and Kathleen E. Woodiwiss

=== Contemporary novels ===
==== Travis series ====
The series, set in Houston, Texas, marks Kleypas' first exploration of contemporary rather than historical romance fiction and follows the adventures of the four Travis brothers, oil magnates.

1. Sugar Daddy (2007)
2. Blue-Eyed Devil (2008)
3. Smooth Talking Stranger (2009)
4. Brown-Eyed Girl (2015)

==== Friday Harbor series ====
1. Christmas Eve at Friday Harbor (2010)
2. Rainshadow Road (2012)
3. Dream Lake (2012)
4. Crystal Cove (2013)

== Awards ==
- 2002 – RITA Award for best Romantic Novella, I Will in Wish List
- 2004 – RITA Award for best Short Historical, Worth Any Price

== Adaptations ==
In 2012, her novel Christmas Eve at Friday Harbor was adapted by Hallmark into a TV movie, Christmas with Holly.

The Wallflowers series had a 2-volumes manga adaptation in 2015. The Hathaways series was adapted into manga between 2011 and 2017 with drawings by Reiko Kishida, Akino Nanami, Jun Hasegawa, Chiho Saito, and Hibiki Sakuraya.
