= Christmas with Holly =

2012 television film by Allan Arkush

- DVD cover
- Genre: Drama
- Based on: Christmas Eve at Friday Harbor by Lisa Kleypas
- Written by: Pnenah Goldstein
- Directed by: Allan Arkush
- Starring: Sean Faris; Eloise Mumford; Alex Paxton-Beesley; Josie Gallina; Lucy Gallina
- Music by: Nathan Wang
- Countries of origin: Canada; United States
- Original language: English

Production
- Producers: Nicole C. Taylor; Andrew Gottlieb
- Cinematography: Charles Minsky
- Editor: Neil Mandelberg
- Running time: 88 minutes
- Production companies: Hallmark Hall of Fame; Andrew Gottlieb Productions

Original release
- Network: ABC
- Release: December 9, 2012

Christmas with Holly is a 2012 made-for-TV film starring Eloise Mumford and Sean Faris based on the 2010 book Christmas Eve at Friday Harbor by Lisa Kleypas. It originally aired on ABC as a Hallmark Hall of Fame film on December 9, 2012.

== Synopsis ==
Holly Nagle has not spoken a word since her mother died in a tragic car accident. Her uncle, and legal guardian, Mark Nagle, decides that it's time for him and Holly to start a new life. They do this by moving from Seattle to Friday Harbor to live with Mark's brothers in their vineyard. While there, Mark and Holly meet Maggie Conway who has also just moved to Friday Harbor. Maggie leaves the city after being left at the altar by her fiancé and opens up a toy store. Together, these three lost souls discover each other and the lives they always dreamed they could have.

== Cast ==
- Sean Faris as Mark Nagle
- Eloise Mumford as Maggie Conway
- Alex Paxton-Beesley as Shelby
- Catherine Bérubé as Kate Conway
- Josie and Lucy Gallina as Holly Nagle
- Daniel Eric Gold as Alex Nagle
- Dana Watkins as Scott Nagle

== Filming ==
Although set in Washington state, the film was shot entirely in Nova Scotia, Canada in August 2012, in the towns of Halifax, Chester and Windsor.

== See also ==
- List of Christmas films
