= 1963 in poetry =

Nationality words link to articles with information on the nation's poetry or literature (for instance, Irish or France).

The woman is perfected.

Her dead

Body wears the smile of accomplishment...

—Opening lines of "Edge" by Sylvia Plath, written days before her suicide

== Events ==
- January 26 – Raghunath Vishnu Pandit, an Indian poet who writes in both Konkani and Marathi languages, publishes five books of poems this day
- February 11 – American-born poet Sylvia Plath (age 30) commits suicide by carbon monoxide poisoning in her London flat (in a house lived in by W. B. Yeats as a child) during the cold winter of 1962–63 in the United Kingdom about a month after publication of her only novel, the semi-autobiographical The Bell Jar and six days after writing (probably) her last poem, "Edge".
- July–August – The Vancouver Poetry Conference is held over a three-week period, involving about 60 people who attend discussions, workshops, lectures, and readings designed by Warren Tallman and Robert Creeley as a summer course at the University of British Columbia. According to Creeley:

"It brought together for the first time a decisive company of then disregarded poets such as Denise Levertov, Charles Olson, Allen Ginsberg, Robert Duncan, Margaret Avison, Philip Whalen... together with as yet unrecognised younger poets of that time, Michael Palmer, Clark Coolidge and many more."

- The Belfast Group, a discussion group of poets in Northern Ireland, is started by Philip Hobsbaum when he moves to Belfast this year. Before the meetings finally end in 1972, attendees at its meetings will include Seamus Heaney, Michael Longley, James Simmons, Paul Muldoon, Ciaran Carson, Stewart Parker, Bernard MacLaverty and the critics Edna Longley and Michael Allen.
- The Soviet government appears to begin removing freedoms previously granted to writers and artists in a process that began in November 1962 and continues this year. Yet the government proves uncertain and the writers persistent. In March 1963 "the gavel fell on the great debate", or so it appears, writes Harrison E. Salisbury, Moscow correspondent for The New York Times. Khrushchev announces that Soviet writers are the servants of the Communist Party and must reflect its orders. Among the authors he specifically targets are the poets Yevgeny Yevtushenko and Andrei Voznesensky. Yevtushenko, on a tour of European cities earlier in the year, recites before large audiences, including a capacity audience at the Palais de Chaillot in Paris, and then returns home. "Literary Stalinists took over almost all the key publishing positions", Salisbury writes. Yet the artists and writers who are criticized either refuse to recant or do so in innocuous language. Alexander Tvardovsky, editor of the magazine Novy Mir, publishes three brutally frank stories by Aleksandr Solzhenitsyn, for instance. By midsummer, the effects of the announced crackdown appear nil, with authors publishing essentially as before. After the Union of Soviet Writers rebukes Voznesensky, he replies "with what is regarded as a classic nonconfessional confession", according to Voznesensky's 2010 obituary in the Times: "It has been said that I must not forget the strict and severe words of Nikita Sergeyevich [Khrushchev]. I will never forget them. He said 'work'. This word is my program." He continues, "What my attitude is to Communism — what I am myself — this work will show."
- Russian poet Anna Akhmatova's Requiem, an elegy about suffering of Soviet people under the Great Purge, composed 1935–61, is first published complete in book form, without her knowledge, in Munich.
- Ukrainian writer Vasyl Symonenko's Kurds'komu bratovi is written and begins to circulate in samizdat.

== Works published in English ==
Listed by nation where the work was first published and again by the poet's native land, if different; substantial revisions listed separately:

=== Australia ===
- Gwen Harwood
  - Poems
  - "Suburban Sonnet" (as by "Miriam Stone")
- James McAuley
  - James McAuley (Australian Poets series), Sydney: Angus & Robertson
  - The Six Days of Creation (An Australian Letters publication)
- Ian Mudie, The North-Bound Rider
- Chris Wallace-Crabbe
  - In Light and Darkness, Sydney: Angus & Robertson
  - Editor, Six Voices: Contemporary Australian Poets, Sydney: Angus & Robertson; American Edition, Westport, Connecticut: 1979 (anthology)

=== Canada ===
- Roy Daniells, The Chequered Shade, a collection of short poems, mostly sonnets
- R. G. Everson, Blind Man's Holiday, a first book of poems
- Eldon Grier, A Friction of Lights
- Irving Layton, Balls for a One-Armed Juggler.
- Lionel Kearns, Songs of Circumstance
- Wilson MacDonald, The Angels Of The Earth. Toronto: Nelson.
- Gwendolyn MacEwen, The Rising Fire
- Al Purdy, The Blur in Between
- James Reaney, The Dance of Death at London, Ontario.

==== Anthologies in Canada ====
- Frank Scott, translator and editor, Saint-Denys Garneau and Anne Hébert
- The Plough and the Pen: Writings From Hungary 1930-1956, translations of Hungarian populist poets and writers by eight Canadian poets, including Earle Birney, A.J.M. Smith and Raymond Souster

=== Ireland ===
- Austin Clarke, Flight to Africa, Dublin: Dolmen Press
- Denis Devlin, Selected Poems, New York: Holt, Rinehart and Winston, Irish poet published in the United States
- Richard Murphy, Sailing to an Island, including "The Poet on the Island", London: Faber and Faber; New York: Chilmark Press, 1965 Irish work published in the United Kingdom

=== New Zealand ===
- James K. Baxter, The Ballad of the Soap Powder Lock-Out, a light-hearted work written by a poet who was at this time a postal worker in New Zealand, in connection with a postal workers’ protest against delivering heavy samples of soap powder
- Alistair Campbell, Sanctuary of Spirits
- Keith Sinclair, A Time to Embrace

=== United Kingdom ===
- Patricia Beer, The Survivors
- Edwin Bronk, With Love From Judas, Lowestoft, Suffolk: Scorpion Press
- W. H. Davies, The Complete Poems of W. H. Davies, introduction by Sir Osbert Sitwell
- C. Day-Lewis, translation, The Eclogues of Virgil (see also his translations The Georgics of Virgil 1940 and The Aenid of Virgil 1952)
- Lawrence Durrell, editor, New Poems 1963: A P.E.N. Anthology of Contemporary Poetry, London: Hutchinson & Co. Ltd.
- T. S. Eliot, Collected Poems 1909–1962
- Michael Hamburger, Weather and Season, London: Routledge and Kegan Paul; New York: Atheneum
- Philip Hobsbaum and Edward Lucie-Smith, editors, A Group Anthology of young poets, many influenced by Ted Hughes, including George MacBeth, Peter Porter, David Wevill, and Peter Redgrove
- James Kirkup, Refusal to Conform
- Laurence Lerner, The Directions of Memory
- George MacBeth, The Broken Places, Lowestoft, Suffolk: Scorpion Press
- Norman MacCaig, A Round of Applause
- Louis MacNeice, The Burning Perch (posthumous)
- John Clark Milne, Poems (posthumous)
- Richard Murphy, Sailing to an Island, London: Faber and Faber; New York: Chilmark Press, 1965 Irish
- Margaret O'Donnell, editor, An Anthology of Commonwealth Verse, London: Blackie & Son
- Wilfred Owen (killed 1918), The Collected Poems of Wilfred Owen, edited and introduced by C. Day-Lewis
- F. T. Prince, The Doors of Stone
- Peter Redgrove, At the White Monument, and Other Poems, London: Routledge and Kegan Paul
- Bernard Spencer, With Luck Lasting
- R. S. Thomas, The Bread of Truth
- Anthony Thwaite, The Owl in the Tree, London: Oxford University Press
- Charles Tomlinson, A Peopled Landscape, London: Oxford University Press
- Rosemary Tonks, Notes on Cafés and Bedrooms

=== United States ===
- Conrad Aiken, The Morning Song of Lord Zero
- John Malcolm Brinnin, Selected Poems
- Gwendolyn Brooks, Selected Poems
- John Ciardi, In Fact
- Evan S. Connell (at this time known as "Evan S. Connell Jr."), Notes From a Bottle Found on the Beach at Carmel
- E.E. Cummings, 73 Poems, posthumously published (died 1962)
- Babette Deutsch, Collected Poems, 1919-1962
- Denis Devlin, Selected Poems, New York: Holt, Rinehart and Winston, Irish poet published in the United States
- Alan Dugan, Poems 2
- Allen Ginsberg, Reality Sandwiches, San Francisco: City Lights Books 6
- Edward Gorey, The Gashlycrumb Tinies
- Daniel G. Hoffman, The City of Satisfactions
- John Hollander, Various Owls
- Robinson Jeffers, The Beginning and the End and Other Poems, posthumously published (died 1962)
- Donald Justice, A Local Storm
- H. P. Lovecraft, Collected Poems
- W. S. Merwin:
  - The Moving Target, New York: Atheneum
  - Translator, The Song of Roland
- Howard Nemerov, The Next Room of the Dream
- Lou B. ("Bink") Noll, The Center of the Circle, a first volume of poetry
- Mary Oliver, No Voyage, and Other Poems (first edition; later released in an expanded edition in 1965)
- Sylvia Plath, The Bell Jar, an autobiographical novel published under the pseudonym "Victoria Lucas"
- Henry Rago, A Sky of Light Summer, New York: Macmillan
- John Crowe Ransom, Selected Poems, revised and enlarged edition
- Kenneth Rexroth, Natural Numbers
- Adrienne Rich, Snapshots of a Daughter-in-Law, her third volume of poetry, gains the poet national prominence for her lyric voice, mostly in free verse, and for her treatment of feminist-related themes
- Theodore Roethke, Sequence, Sometimes Metaphysical
- Carl Sandburg, Honey and Salt
- Anne Sexton, All My Pretty Ones
- Louis Simpson, At the End of the Open Road, Middletown, Connecticut: Wesleyan University Press
- William Stafford, Traveling Through the Dark
- Jesse Stuart, Hold April
- May Swenson, To Mix With Time
- John Updike, Telephone Poles, and Other Poems
- Mark Van Doren, Collected and New Poems, 1924-1963
- David Wagoner, The Nesting Ground
- William Carlos Williams, Paterson, all five books of this long poem first published together
- James Wright, The Branch Will Not Break, Middletown, Connecticut: Wesleyan University Press

==== Criticism, scholarship and biography in the United States ====
- Louis Zukofsky, Bottom: On Shakespeare a work of literary philosophy
- Robert Bly's "A Wrong Turning in American Poetry" published in Choice

=== Other in English ===
- Viresh Chander Dutt, Poems and Meditations, Calcutta: self-published; India, Indian poetry in English

== Works published in other languages ==
Listed by language and often by nation where the work was first published and again by the poet's native land, if different; substantially revised works listed separately:

=== Denmark ===
- Inger Christensen, Græs: digte ("Grass")
- Ivan Malinovski, Romerske Bassiner ("Roman Pools")
- Jørgen Sonne, Krese ("Cycles")

=== Finland ===
- Aila Meriluoto, Asumattomiin
- Lassi Nummi, Kuutsimittaa

=== French language ===
==== Canada, in French ====
- Marie-Claire Blais, Pays voilés, Québec: Éditions Garneau
- Ronald Desprês, Les Cloisons en vertige
- Alfred Desrochers, Le Retour de Titus
- Alain Grandbois, Poèmes
- Gatien Lapointe, Ode au Saint-Laurent
- Wilfred Lemoine, Sauf-conduits
- Pierre Perrault, Toutes isles
- Jean-Guy Pilon, Pour saluer une ville
- Edmond Robillard, Blanc et noir: Poèmes de nature et de grâce, Montréal: Éditions du Lévrier

==== France ====
- Louis Aragon, Le Fou d'Elsa
- P. Bealu, Amour me cele, celle que j'aime
- Jacques Dupin, Gravir
- Pierre Emmanuel, pen name of Noël Mathieu, La Nouvelle Naissance
- Leon-Paul Fargue, Poesies, a collection of the author's early books published here posthumously (died 1947) with a preface by Saint-John Perse
- Maurice Fombeure, Quel est ce coeur?
- Paul Gilson, Enigmarelle
- Eugène Guillevic, Sphère
- Edmond Jabès, Le Livre des Questions
- Saint-John Perse:
  - Au souvenir de Valery Larbaud, Liège: Editions Dynamo
  - Oiseaux
  - Poésie
  - Silence pour Claudel, Liège: Editions Dynamo
- Denis Roche, Récits complets
- Victor Segalen, Ode, suivi de Thibet
- An anthology of Hungarian poetry translated by poets Jean Rousselot, Jean Follain, and Eugène Guillevic

=== German ===
- Erich Fried, Reich der Steine a volume of cycles of poetry
- Rupert Hirschenauer and Albrecht Weber, editors, Wege zum Gedicht, 2 volumes (second volume, on the ballad, published this year, previous volume published in 1956), scholarship
- Peter Huchel, Chausseen, Chausseen: Gedichte (East Germany)
- Christa Reinig, Gedichte (East Germany)

=== Hebrew ===
- Nathan Alterman, a four-volume edition of his writing
- Yehuda Amichai, a book of poetry
- Y. Bat-Miriam, a book of poetry
- J. Lichtenbaum, a book of poetry
- J. Rabinow, a book of poetry
- J. Ratosh, a book of poetry
- D. Rokeah, a book of poetry
- S. Shalom, a book of poetry
- A. Tur-Malkah, a book of poetry

=== India ===
Listed in alphabetical order by first name:

- Indra Dev Bhojvani, also known as "Indur"; Sindhi-language:
  - Bijilyun Thyun Barsani
  - Praha Bakhun Kadhyun
- Nilmani Phookan, Surya Heno Nami Ahe Ei Nadiyedi ("The sun is said to come descending by this river"), Assamese language
- Harumal Isardas Sadarangani, Ruha D'ino Relo, Sindhi-language

=== Spanish language ===
==== Latin America ====
- Carlos Albert, editor, 13 poetas Argentinos de hoy, an anthology from the publisher Editorial Goyanarte (Argentina)
- Alfonso Alcalde, Variaciones sobre el tema del amor y de la muerte (Chile)
- Jorge Carrera Andrade, Angel planetario (Ecuador)
- Mario Benedetti (Uruguay):
  - Inventario, Poesía 1950–1958 ("Inventory, Poems 1950–1958")
  - Poemas del hoyporhoy ("Poems of Today"), Uruguay
- Esther de Cáceres, Los Cantos del destierro
- Roland Cárdenas, En el invierno de la provincia
- Arturo Corcuera, Noé delirante (Peru)
- Lupo Hernández Rueda, Muerte y memoria (Dominican Republic)
- Francisco Monterde, Sakura, including poetry inspired by epigrams and haiku (Mexico)

=== Swedish ===
- Solveig von Schoultz, Sänk ditt ljus

=== Yiddish ===
- E. Ayzikovich, a new book of poems
- Sore Birnboym, a new book of poems
- Jacob Friedmann, Nefilim, drama in the form of a symbolic poem
- Aaron Glanz-Leyeles, Amerike un ikh ("America and I") (United States)
- Jeremiah Hescheles, Lider ("Poems")
- Leon Kusman, a new book of poems
- Israel Mordechai Levin, a new book of poems
- Moyshe Khayim Likhtshteyn, a new book of poems
- Nosn Mark, a new book of poems
- Leyb Olitski, a new book of poems
- Ephraim Auerbach, Der step vakht ("The Steppe Is Awake"), with Hassidic mysticism as an inspiration (United States)
- Nachman Raf, a new book of poems
- Eliyohu Reyzman, a new book of poems
- M. M. Shafir, a new book of poems
- Moshe Shklar, a new book of poems
- Hersh Leib Young, a new book of poems

=== Other ===
- Nanni Balestrini, Come si agisce (Italy)
- Manuel Bandeira, Estrêla da tarde, a selection from previous works (Brazil)
- Ascensio Ferreira, Catimbó e outros poemas, a collection of three previous books (Brazil)
- Stratis Haviaras, Η κυρία με την πυξίδα (Lady with a Compass, Greece)

== Awards and honors ==
- Nobel Prize in Literature: Giorgos Seferis

=== Australia ===
- Grace Leven Prize for Poetry: Ian Mudie, The North-Bound Rider

=== United Kingdom ===
- Eric Gregory Award: Ian Hamilton, Stewart Conn, Peter Griffith, David Wevill
- Queen's Gold Medal for Poetry: William Plomer
- Newdigate Prize: not awarded

=== United States ===
- February 19 - Robert Frost wins Bollingen Prize
- Consultant in Poetry to the Library of Congress (later the post would be called "Poet Laureate Consultant in Poetry to the Library of Congress"): Howard Nemerov appointed this year.
- American Academy of Arts and Letters Gold Medal in Poetry, William Carlos Williams
- National Book Award for Poetry: William Stafford, Traveling Through the Dark
- Pulitzer Prize for Poetry: William Carlos Williams: Pictures from Breughel
- Fellowship of the Academy of American Poets: Ezra Pound and Allen Tate

== Births ==
- May 19 – Michael Symmons Roberts, English
- May 26 – Simon Armitage, English poet laureate and playwright
- August 7 – Lynn Crosbie, Canadian poet and novelist
- September 4 – Claudia Rankine, American poet born in Jamaica and raised there and in New York City.
- December 24 – Naja Marie Aidt, Danish poet and writer
- Also:
  - He Xiaozhu, Chinese-Hmong poet, novelist and short story writer
  - Michael Derrick Hudson, American poet and librarian
  - John Kinsella, Australian
  - Don Paterson, Scottish poet, writer and musician
  - Fiona Sampson, English
  - Lutz Seiller, German

== Deaths ==
Birth years link to the corresponding "[year] in poetry" article:

- January 29 – Robert Frost, 88, American poet
- February 11 – Sylvia Plath, 30, American-born poet, by suicide
- March 4 – William Carlos Williams, 79, American poet
- April 18 – Lady Margaret Sackville, 81, English poet and children's author
- April 25 – Christopher Hassall, 51, English lyricist
- May 6 – Mantarō Kubota 久保田万太郎 (born 1889), Japanese author, playwright and poet
- August 1 – Theodore Roethke, 55, American poet and winner of the 1954 Pulitzer Prize for Poetry
- August 3 – Evelyn Scott (born 1893), American poet, novelist and playwright
- September 3
  - Eva Dobell, 87, English poet, nurse, and editor best known for her verses related to World War I soldiers
  - Louis MacNeice, 55, British poet, playwright and producer, of pneumonia
- September 10 – Bernard Spencer, 53 English poet, apparently in accident
- October 11 – Jean Cocteau, 74, French poet, playwright, novelist, painter, designer, producer and critic
- November 22 – Patrick MacGill, 73, Irish-born "navvy poet" and journalist
- December 2 – Sasaki Nobutsuna 佐佐木信綱 (born 1872), Japanese, Shōwa period tanka poet and scholar of the Nara and Heian periods
- December 24 – Tristan Tzara, 67, French poet (native of Romania) and a founder of Dadaism

== See also ==
- Poetry
- List of poetry awards
- List of years in poetry
