= Claudia Bishop =

Claudia Bishop is the pen name of two different authors:

- Jane Feather, British-American romantic fiction writer
- Mary Stanton, American mystery fiction writer (Hemlock Falls Mystery series)
