= Julia London =

American writer of romance novels as (born 1959)

Dinah Dinwiddie
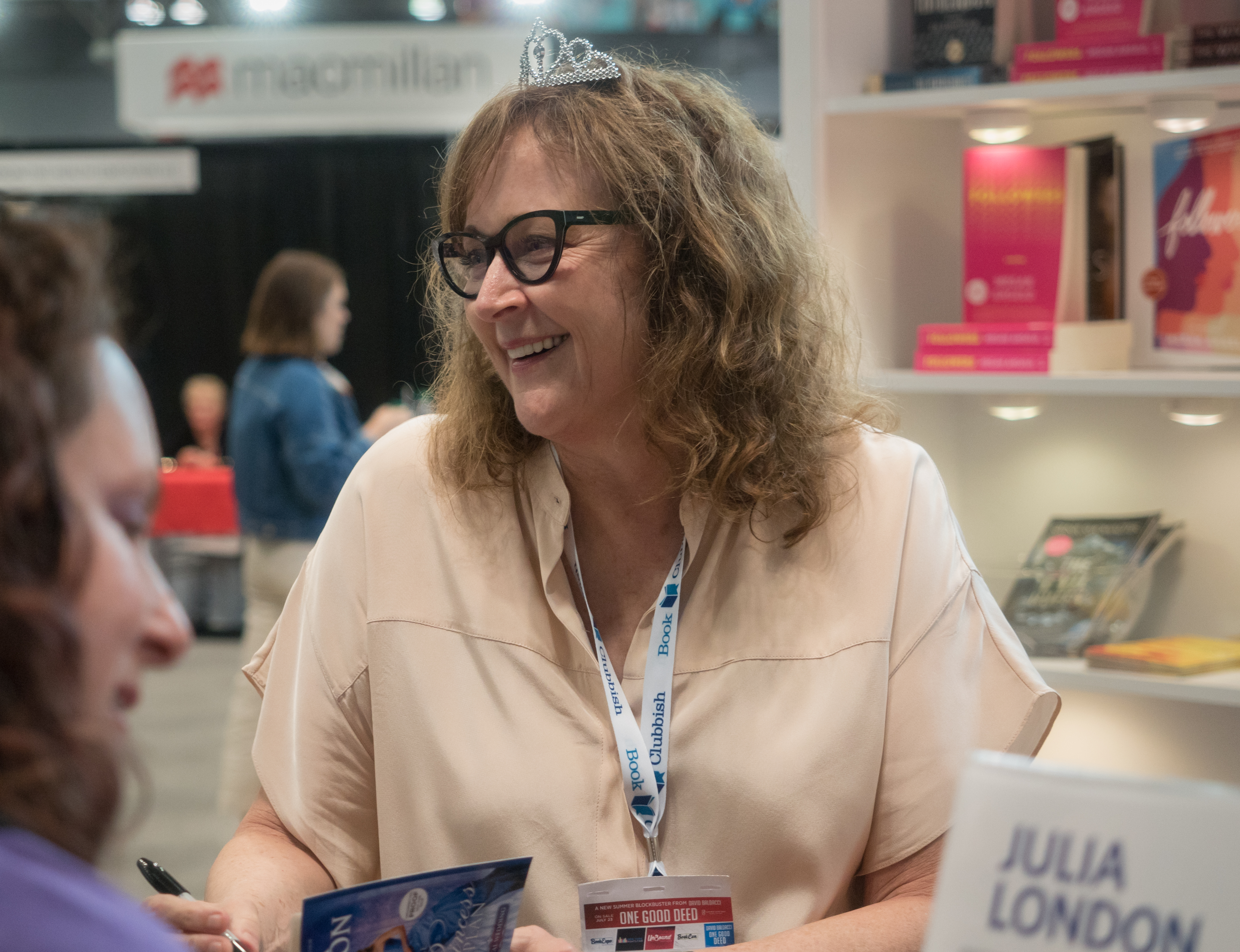
- Julia London at BookCon in 2019
- Born: March 18, 1959 (age 67); Texas, U.S.
- Occupation: Novelist
- Writing career
- Pen name: Julia London
- Period: 1998-present
- Genre: Romance
- Website: julialondon.com

Julia London is the pen name of Dinah Dinwiddie (born March 18, 1959), an American writer of historical and contemporary romance novels. Her historical and contemporary romance novels, many of them written in series, have made the bestseller lists of The New York Times, Publishers Weekly and USA Today.

== Biography ==
Dinwiddie was born and raised on a ranch in Texas. She graduated from college and worked in Washington D.C. before returning to Texas.

She was a public administrator before she finally decided to become a writer. Her historical and contemporary romance novels have made the bestseller lists of The New York Times, Publishers Weekly and USA Today.

An award-winning author, she is a six-time finalist for the RITA Award.

== Works ==
=== Regent Street's Rogues & Family series ===
1. The Devil's Love (1998/Dec)
2. Wicked Angel (1999/May)
3. The Dangerous Gentleman (2000/Apr)
4. The Ruthless Charmer (2000/Oct)
5. The Beautiful Stranger (2001/Jul)
6. The Secret Lover (2002/May)

=== Lear Family Saga series ===
1. Material Girl (2003/Aug)
2. Beauty Queen (2004/Apr)
3. Miss Fortune (2004/Nov)

=== Highlander Lockhart series ===
1. Highlander Unbound (2004/Feb)
2. Highlander in Disguise (2005/Feb)
3. Highlander in Love (2005/Aug)

=== Thrillseekers, Anonymous series ===
1. Wedding Survivor (2005/Oct)
2. Extreme Bachelor (2006/Jun)
3. American Diva (2007/Aug)

=== Desperate Debutantes series ===
1. The Hazards of Hunting a Duke (2006/May)
2. The Perils of Pursuing a Prince (2007/Apr)
3. The Dangers of Deceiving a Viscount (2007/Oct)

=== Scandalous series ===
1. The Book of Scandal (2008/Aug)
2. Highland Scandal (2009/Apr)
3. A Courtesan's Scandal (2009/Oct)

=== Cedar Springs series ===
1. Summer of Two Wishes (2009/Aug)
2. One Season of Sunshine (2010/Jun)
3. A Light at Winter's End (2011/Feb)

=== Secrets of Hadley Green series ===
1. The Year of Living Scandalously (2010/Oct)
2. The Revenge of Lord Eberlin (2012/Feb)
3. The Seduction of Lady X (2012/Mar)
4. The Last Debutante (2013/Mar)

=== The Cabot Sisters series ===
1. The Trouble With Honor (2014/Mar)
2. The Devil Takes a Bride (2015/Feb)
3. The Scoundrel and the Debutante (2015/April)

=== Homecoming Ranch series ===
1. Homecoming Ranch (2013/Aug)
2. Return to Homecoming Ranch (2014/Jul)
3. The Perfect Homecoming (2015/Mar)

=== Lake Haven series ===
1. "Suddenly in Love" (2016/Apr)
2. "Suddenly Dating" (2016/Nov)
3. "Suddenly Engaged" (2017/Jul)

=== Highland Groom series ===
1. "Wild Wicked Scot" (2017/Jan)
2. "Sinful Scottish Laird" (2017/Mar)
3. "Hard-Hearted Highlander" (2017/May)

=== Anthologies in collaboration ===
- "The Vicar's Daughter" in Talk of the Ton 2005,04 (with Eloisa James, Rebecca Hagan Lee)
- "Lucky Charm" in Hot Ticket 2006,05 (with Annette Blair, Geri Buckley and Deirdre Martin)
- "The Merchant's Daughter" in The School for Heiresses 2006,12 (with Renee Bernard, Liz Carlyle, Sabrina Jeffries)
- "Snowy Night with a Highlander" in Snowy Night with a Stranger 2008, (with Jane Feather, Sabrina Jeffries)

=== Novellas ===
1. A Christmas Secret (2011/Nov)
2. The Bridesmaid (2013/Oct)
3. One Mad Night (2015/Jan)

=== With Alina Adams ===
- Guiding Light: Jonathan's Story (2007/Sep)

=== Other ===
- Devil in Tartan (Harlequin)(c. 2018)
