= Carol Bly =

American novelist

- Born: Carolyn McLean; April 16, 1930; Duluth, Minnesota, U.S.
- Died: December 21, 2007 (aged 77); Oakdale, Minnesota, U.S.
- Education: Wellesley College (BA); University of Minnesota
- Occupations: Short story writer; essayist; nonfiction writer
- Spouse: Robert Bly (m. 1955; div. 1979)
- Children: 4, including Mary Bly
- Writing career
- Period: 1970s–2000s

Carol Bly (April 16, 1930 – December 21, 2007) was an American teacher and an author of short stories, essays, and nonfiction works on writing. Her work often featured Minnesota women who must identify the moral crisis that is facing their community or themselves and enact change through empathy, or opening one's eyes to the realities of the situation.

== Early years ==
=== Childhood ===
Carolyn McLean was the youngest child and only daughter of Mildred (née Washburn) and Charles Russell McLean of Duluth, Minnesota. She was raised in Duluth and Tryon, North Carolina, where she was sent to live with one of her father's sisters because her mother had had tuberculosis and was often away from the family being treated in sanitariums.

McLean's mother died in 1942, at a time when two of her older brothers were fighting in World War II. As a young teen, she worried for the safety of her family and often had nightmares about the Gestapo. She never lost her preoccupation with the damage that evil people could do.

=== Education ===
After graduating from the Abbot Academy boarding school, McLean received her B.A. in English and history from Wellesley College in 1951 and spent several years working in New York and Boston before undertaking graduate-level work at the University of Minnesota in 1954 and 1955.

=== Family ===
While at Wellesley, McLean met Robert Elwood Bly on a blind date. She was Episcopalian; he was Lutheran. They married in 1955 and moved to Robert Bly's family farm near the small town of Madison, Minnesota. At the time, the farm had no running water. The family lived a relatively simple life, and as she once told a disbelieving census taker, instead of owning a television they entertained themselves with their more than 5,000 books. Their house was usually filled with visiting poets, including Donald Hall, James Wright, and Bill Holm, all of whom were asked to do their share of chores before Bly would feed them.

The couple had four children, Micah, Bridget, Noah, and Mary, who is an English professor at Fordham University and a best-selling romance novelist under the pseudonym Eloisa James. Carol and Robert Bly divorced in 1979.

== Career ==
While her children were small, Bly worked on the farm when necessary and found time to manage the literary journals published by her husband and William Duffy, Fifties and Sixties, as well as managing their business, the Sixties and the Seventies Press.

At the beginning of the next decade, Bly was asked to write a monthly column, "A Letter from the Country" for the Minnesota Public Radio Magazine. Writing these short essays about rural life taught her how to think and to express herself well in a relatively small number of pages. The essays were later compiled into the book Letters From the Country, published in 1981. Three of her stories were also combined into the movie Rachel River, which starred Craig T. Nelson.

=== Works ===
Bly's short stories are known for their realistic characters and situations, which are fully developed within the small number of pages the story allows. Although many of her stories are set in Minnesota, the people and the situations transcend local boundaries, emphasizing pride in one's work, resourcefulness, the ability to laugh at one's self, and the ability "to hold values beyond one's own immediate welfare."

Perhaps inspired by Robert Bly's co-founding of American Writers Against the Vietnam War in 1966, Bly used her literature to reflect modern-day concerns. Her work is in many ways an ethical treatise, often featuring a "bully", embodied by either a person or a corporation, who takes pleasure in forcing his will on another person or group of people. Some of her stories also explore evil, which, to her, is seen in people or organizations which find enjoyment in enslaving, humiliating, or crushing their opponents. The stories emphasize redemption through empathy, which, to Bly, is the step of deliberately looking at how one's actions impact others. Bly always called herself a C.S. Lewis person; she dutifully read Bonhoeffer, but found him dull.

A typical Bly protagonist is a conventional woman who has been content to live in "ignorant complacency," but, through her own strength and intelligence must first identify the moral crisis facing either her or her community and then work to accomplish change. In her best works, the moral center is hard to find, as each character has some claim to the reader's sympathies.

=== Teaching ===
To reach a broader audience, Bly wrote several books to assist others in learning to write well. Rather than concentrate on the technical basics of writing a story, these books provide tips for writing a story that is "morally, politically, and emotionally deep." Her books are somewhat controversial, as they encourage students to use "the sort of 'empathetic questioning' therapists and social workers use" in order to find their strongest feelings and amplify their ideas.

These principles were demonstrated during the four creative writing workshops that Bly taught each spring in Saint Paul, Minnesota as well as in the talks and readings she gave. The workshops were of limited size, usually including only eight students, with Bly lecturing as well as providing individual advice and criticism of the student's works.

=== Recognition ===
Bly was awarded the 2001 Minnesota Humanities Award for Literature. She had previously been named the University of Minnesota Edelstein-Keller Distinguished Minnesota Author (1998–1999) and the Minnesota Women's Press Favorite Woman Author (2000).

Bly was a member of the board of directors for The Loft Literary Center from 1991 to 1994, and the board of Episcopal Community Services in 1978–1979. Bly was also a member of the Minnesota Book and Literary Arts Building Authors' Advisory Group in 1999. She has designed workshops for Women Against Military Madness, National Association of Social Workers, and the Midwest Institute of School Social Workers, and was a consultant to the Land Stewardship Project from 1983 to 1992.

== Later years and death ==
Following her 1979 divorce, Bly moved to Sturgeon Lake, Minnesota; in 1986, she bought a house in St. Paul. In 2003, Bly donated to the University of Minnesota her correspondence, notes from writing workshops and classes she taught, and drafts of her works. The eighty-nine boxes included papers written when she was a child as well as later work. Also in 2003, Bly and a friend, Cynthia Loveland, opened Bly and Loveland Press, a small publishing company which has so far published four books that they have written together. Their press also sold custom crossword puzzles, which Bly designed. She continued to work until the end of her life, completing a novel, Shelter Half, which was published posthumously in June 2008 by Holy Cow! Press.

Bly died of ovarian cancer on December 21, 2007, aged 77, in Oakdale, Minnesota.

== Selected bibliography ==
=== Fiction ===
- Backbone (Milkweed Editions, 1984)
- The Tomcat's Wife and Other Stories (HarperCollins, 1991)
- My Lord Bag of Rice: New and Selected Stories (Milkweed Editions, 2000)
- Shelter Half (Holy Cow! Press, 2008)

=== Essays ===
- Letters from the Country (1981, reissued 1999)
- An Adolescent's Christmas: 1944 (1999)
- Bad Government and Silly Literature: An Essay
- Soil and Survival: Land Stewardship and the Future of American Agriculture
- Changing the Bully Who Rules the World (1996)
- There once was a man from Nantucket, (1950)

=== Books on writing ===
- Beyond the Writer's Workshop: New Ways to Write Creative Nonfiction (2000)
- The Passionate, Accurate Story (1990, reissued 1997)

=== With Cynthia Loveland ===
- Three Readings for Republicans and Democrats
- Stopping the Gallop to Empire
- A Shout to American Clergy
- Against Workshopping Manuscripts

=== Stories ===
Title	Publication	Collected in
"Gunnar's Sword"	American Review 19 (1974)	Backbone
"The Last of the Gold Star Mothers"	The New Yorker (September 24, 1979)	Backbone
"The Mouse Roulette Wheel" aka "Brothers"	25 Minnesota Writers, ed. Seymour Yesner (1980)	Backbone
"The Dignity of Life"	Ploughshares 8.2/3 (1982)	Backbone
"Talk of Heroes"	Twin Cities Magazine (1982)	Backbone
"The Ex-Class Agent"	TriQuarterly 62 (Winter 1985)	The Tomcat's Wife
"A Committee of the Whole"	TriQuarterly 73 (Fall 1988)	The Tomcat's Wife
"After the Baptism"	Western Humanities Review 42.2 (Summer 1988)	The Tomcat's Wife
"My Lord Bag of Rice"	The Laurel Review 23.2 (Summer 1989)	The Tomcat's Wife
"The Tender Organizations"	The Tender Organizations (1989)	The Tomcat's Wife
"The Tomcat's Wife"	The Tomcat's Wife (1991)	The Tomcat's Wife
"An Apprentice"	The Tomcat's Wife (1991)	The Tomcat's Wife
"Amends"	The Tomcat's Wife (1991)	The Tomcat's Wife
"Chuck's Money"	TriQuarterly 104 (Winter 1999)	My Lord Bag of Rice
"Hard Calls"	Witness 13.2 (1999)	-
"Renee: A War Story"	My Lord Bag of Rice (2000)	My Lord Bag of Rice
"At the Bottom of the United States"	Idaho Review 4 (2002)	from Shelter Half
"Love in a Time of Empire"	Prairie Schooner 77.2 (Summer 2003)	from Shelter Half
"Crime"	Idaho Review 5 (2003)	from Shelter Half
"An Amateur's Story"	Prairie Schooner 80.2 (Summer 2006)	from Shelter Half
"Therapist"	Glimmer Train 67 (Summer 2008)	from Shelter Half

== Awards and recognition ==
- 2001 - Minnesota Humanities Award for Literature
- 2000 - Minnesota Women's Press Favorite Woman Author
- 1998-1999 Edelstein-Keller Author of Distinction, University of Minnesota
- 1994 - Friend of School Social Work, Minnesota School Social Workers' Association
- 1992 - Honorary Doctor of Humane Letters, Northland College
- 1991 - Friend of American Writers Award
- 1991 - Bush Foundation Artists Fellowship
- 1990 - Minnesota State Annual Book Award, for essays
- 1990 - Minnesota State Arts Board Individual Artist Grant
- 1985 - South Dakota Council of Teachers of English Certificate of Honor
- Seabury-Western Theological Seminary Distinguished Christian Service Award
- Ramsey County Women's Political Caucus Founding Feminist
- Minnesota Women's Consortium Distinguished Minnesota Leader Award
