= Liz Carlyle =

American novelist

Susan T. Woodhouse
- Born: Susan Tatum Woodhouse; August 7, 1958 (age 68); Suffolk, Virginia, U.S.
- Occupation: Novelist
- Spouse(s): Edward Carlyle; two stepchildren
- Writing career
- Pen name: Liz Carlyle
- Language: English
- Period: 1999 - present
- Genre: Romance
- Notable work: The Devil to Pay
- Notable awards: RITA award – Long Historical Romance; 2006 The Devil to Pay
- Website: www.lizcarlyle.com

Susan Tatum Woodhouse (born August 7, 1958, Suffolk, Virginia), known by her pseudonym Liz Carlyle, is an American writer of romance novels since 1999, primarily of historical romances.

== Biography ==
=== Personal life ===
Susan Tatum Woodhouse was born in 1958 in Suffolk, Virginia. She attended college on a Scripps Howard writing scholarship and majored in journalism. She is married to Edward Carlyle, and has two stepchildren.

=== Career ===
She spent much of her career working in human resources and labor relations in the chemical and automotive industries. She didn't begin writing until December 1996, when she was between jobs. She finished the novel within two months and attempted to find a publisher for it. Although that work did not sell, Pocket Books was interested in seeing more of her work. In 1998 they bought two novels from her, publishing the first, My False Heart, in 1999. In 2003, she contributed a novella to the anthology Big Guns, marking her first foray into contemporary romance.

== Books ==
=== Lorimer Family & Clan Cameron ===
1. My False Heart † (1999) Elliott Armstrong, Lord Rannoch and Evangeline Stone
2. A Woman Scorned (2000) Jonet Cameron, Lady Mercer and Cole Amherst
3. A Woman of Virtue † (2001) Cecilia Lorimer, Lady Walrafen and David Braithwaite, Lord Delacourt
4. A Deal with the Devil † (2004) Giles Lorimer, Lord Walrafen and Aubrey Montford
5. Wicked All Day (2009) Zoe Armstrong and Stuart, Lord Mercer

=== Rutledge Family ===
1. Beauty Like the Night (2000) Cam Rutledge and Helene de Severs
2. No True Gentleman † (2002) Max de Rohan and Catherine Rutledge Wodeway
3. The Devil You Know † (2003) Randolph Bentley Rutledge and Frederica d'Avillez

=== MacLachlan Family and Friends ===
1. The Devil to Pay † (2005) Aleric, Lord Devellyn, and Sidonie Saint-Goddard
2. One Little Sin (2005) Sir Alasdair MacLachlan and Esmee Hamilton
3. Two Little Lies (2005) Quin Hewitt, Lord Wynwood and Viviana Alessandri
4. Three Little Secrets (2006) Merrick MacLachlan and Madeline, Lady Besset
5. One Touch of Scandal (2010) Adrian, Lord Ruthveyn and Grace Gauthier
6. The Bride Wore Scarlet (2011) Anaïs de Rohan and Geoff Archard, Lord Bassett
7. The Bride Wore Pearls † (2012) Lady Anisha Stafford and Rance Welham, Lord Lazonby
8. A Bride by Moonlight (2013) Lisette Colburne and Royden Napier, Baron Saint-Bryce
9. In Love With A Wicked Man (2013) Ned Quartermaine and Kate, Baroness d'Allenay
10. The Earl's Mistress (2014) Tony, Earl of Hepplewood and Isabella Aldridge

=== Neville Family and Friends ===
1. After Midnight (2006) Martinique Neville and Justin, Lord St. Vrain (included in The School for Heiresses anthology; with Sabrina Jeffries, Julia London, and Renee Bernard)
2. Never Lie to a Lady † (2007) Stefan Northampton, Lord Nash and Xanthia Neville
3. Never Deceive a Duke † (2007) Gareth Lloyd, Duke of Warneham and Antonia, Duchess of Warneham
4. Never Romance a Rake † (2008) Kieran Neville, Lord Rothewell and Camille Marchand
5. Tempted All Night † (2009) Tristan Talbot, Lord Avoncliff and Lady Phaedra Northampton

=== Anthologies ===
- Tea for Two (2002) (with Cathy Maxwell)
- Big Guns Out of Uniform (2003) (with Nicole Camden and Sherrilyn Kenyon) (contemporary romance)
- The One That Got Away (2004) (with Victoria Alexander, Eloisa James and Cathy Maxwell)
- The School for Heiresses (2006) (with Renee Bernard, Sabrina Jeffries and Julia London)
- †: Features George Kemble

== Awards and reception ==
- 2006 - Romance Writers of America RITA Award, Long Historical Romance – The Devil to Pay

Carlyle has also been nominated for Romantic Times Reviewers' Choice Awards five times, winning in 1999 for My False Heart as well as having been nominated for a Romantic Times Career Achievement Award. Several of her books have become USA Today bestsellers.
