= Three Weeks With Lady X =

2014 novel by Eloisa James

First edition (publ. Avon Books)

Three Weeks With Lady X is a historical romance written by Eloisa James and published in 2014. It was a New York Times Bestseller and was nominated for two Romantic Times awards.

The novel is considered a Regency romance, with much of the conflict revolving around the societal expectations of the time. In a departure from other novels of this type, James gave her heroine an occupation. Her interior decorating skills were inspired by James' love for HGTV. The hero is also unusual for the time period, being neither a lord nor legitimate. The primary and the secondary characters are richly drawn and fully developed. The novel is considered very sensual, and marked James' first foray into more explicit love scenes.

The hero was first introduced as a child in James' 2009 work This Duchess of Mine. The protagonists have secondary roles in James's next book, Four Nights With a Duke.

== Inspiration and publication ==
Eloisa James is the pen name of Mary Bly, a professor of English at Fordham University.

Three Weeks With Lady X is the seventh novel of James's Desperate Duchesses series, and the first to focus on the children of the original characters. The hero of Three Weeks, Tobias "Thorn" Dautry, was introduced in James' 2009 novel This Duchess of Mine. In that book, Thorn was a child. James said that having years, instead of weeks, to think about the character helped her to bring more depth to his story. James also noted that she quite enjoyed bringing back those characters, ten years after the events of the book in which they were featured.

The story was partially inspired by Homes and Gardens Television (HGTV). James is an ardent fan of the network's competitions between decorators and interior designers, and the programs made her think more about what redecorating may have been like during the Regency period. Her research had shown that many noble families were essentially bankrupt and often sold their estates or lost them to gambling debts. She speculated that the new owners, similar to those featured on HGTV shows, would want to redecorate.

The novel was released as a paperback, ebook, and audiobook on March 25, 2014 It is a full-length novel, as opposed to a category romance, with the paperback running to 384 pages. James had significant input to the cover of the American edition. The cover is bisected, with a strip of black on the left side and the picture of a woman on the right. James takes credit for suggesting the solid color on the left, although the art department had to convince her that black was the appropriate color.

A sequel to the book, Four Nights With a Duke, was released in March 2015 and follows one of the secondary characters, Lord Vander Brody.

== Plot summary ==
The novel is a historical romance, set in England in 1799, which is commonly known as the Georgian period. The book begins with Lady Xenobia India St. Clair enduring yet another bad marriage proposal. The orphaned daughter of a marquess with unusual ideas on child rearing, India, as she is known throughout the novel, is determined not to marry for money. After the deaths of her parents, she supported herself—and earned herself a sizable dowry—as an interior designer. Now aged 26, she wants children and is prepared to leave her career to find a husband. Her friend Eleanor, the Duchess of Villiers, who was featured in This Duchess of Mine, convinces her to take one last commission, with Eleanor's stepson, Tobias "Thorn" Dautry.

As explained in the earlier novel, Thorn had been abandoned by his mother and worked as a mudlark in the London slums before being rescued by his father, the Duke of Villiers. According to the constraints of English society at the time, as both an illegitimate son and a man who had made a fortune in trade (rather than inheriting one), Thorn is not considered respectable. He wants his future children to be accepted by society, and concocts a plan to marry a docile, well-bred young woman who likes children. He chooses Lady Laetitia "Lala" Rainsford, whose father is out of funds and willing to evaluate Thorn solely on his wealth. Lala's mother, however, is a snob who wishes her daughter to marry a man with a title. To impress his future mother-in-law, Thorn purchases a country house and invites the Rainsfords to visit in three weeks' time.

The novel depicts Thorn's new estate as fairly run-down, with a debauched decorating scheme inappropriate for Lady Rainsford's eyes. He hires India to completely renovate the home. From their very first scene together, the characters indulge in significant verbal sparring. Once India travels to the estate, their relationship develops over a series of hilarious letters. The two become friends, and then begin a flirtation.

The second half of the book takes place after the renovation is complete, allowing India and Thorn to be in the same location. As they secretly court each other, India and Thorn are forced to confront their own insecurities and fears and to determine how to handle society's expectations of them. In this half, Lala's character is also heavily developed. Other characters perceive her as sweet and biddable, a counterpoint to the independence and spirit attributed to India. In actuality, Lala has definite opinions, and she does not want to marry Thorn, who intimidates her. As the book progresses, it is revealed that Lala cannot read. Although most of the other characters, with the exception of India, believe this means Lala is stupid, readers can recognize that she is actually dsylexic.

A secondary plotline involves Thorn's new ward, Rose, an overly precocious child. The interactions between Thorn and Rose show his softer side. Rose's point-of-view is made quite clear in certain sections of the story.

== Themes ==
In what she calls an homage to classic literature, some of James's scenes and dialogue borrow from her extensive knowledge of English literature to provide additional insight into her characters and foreshadowing of future events. The opening scene of the novel closely imitates Jane Austen's Pride and Prejudice, as Lord Dibbleshire proposes to Lady India using speech very similar to the proposal that Darcy gives Elizabeth; James intends this as foreshadowing that India has much in common with Elizabeth, and Dibbleshire is just as arrogant as Darcy. Later in the novel, James writes a small speech for the Duke of Villiers that is reminiscent of T.S. Eliot.

In many ways, the book is fairly typical for a Regency romance, in that it focuses heavily on manners and societal expectations. To keep her career, India must take extreme care with her reputation. She is the consummate professional, able to keep her composure despite any challenges. This allows James to play with the stereotype of the "ice queen" who needs to be melted. India's reserve intrigues Thorn, who deliberately acts to provoke her temper and make her lose her cool. The difference in their social stations—his bastardy compared to her status as daughter of a marquess—officially makes it seem impossible for them to have a permanent relationship. The novel does departs from the traditional in two distinct ways. First, the heroine has an occupation, and, second, the hero is not a titled noble, but is instead in trade.

James usually writes her books in sets of three or more novels, allowing her to more fully explore the relationships between all of the characters, not just the hero and heroine. In the past, the books have been generally connected by sets of very good female friends or sisters, as Bly finds those relationships important in her own life. In Three Weeks With Lady X, James continues the tradition of reusing her characters, bringing back the popular characters of the Duke and Duchess of Villiers. Rather than focus on sisters, however, the novel explores the brotherly relationship between the hero and his best friend, Lord Evander Brody.

The novel is quite sensual, with Romantic Times labeling it "Hot", and Kirkus Reviews describing it as "intense and explolsive". This is the first novel in which James has used the term "cock" for male genitalia, a decision she says was made deliberately. Melissa Mohr, author of a book on the history of swearing, says that although the term has been in use in pornography since the Victorian era, "because romance novels are written for women, that word would have been seen as kind of masculine, kind of harder, and so previously, romance novels would have used other words.” James chose to use the more explicit terminology in this novel, rather than euphemisms, in order to keep up with the language used by young women today. Her editor, Carrie Feron, notes that "I think it’s really hard to shock readers these days, especially after ‘Fifty Shades’ — which is not a romance — has become so mainstream." James was given free rein to write the love scenes, as Feron's policy is not to change those as long as the rest of the novel is good and the love scenes don't cause laughter.

== Reception ==
Reviewers frequently commented that the plot was fairly simple, but the complex characterization made the book a joy to read. At Smart Bitches, Trashy Books, reviewer Elyse noted that the characters had well-drawn emotional depths, and were forced to surmount problems that would resonate with most readers, particularly the idea of making peace with one's past. The review in Kirkus highlighted the "complex, intriguing, and endearing" characters and noted that the secondary characters, as well as the protagonists, were richly drawn.

The witty dialog and the twist of having much communication occur by letter, were also lauded by many reviewers. Publishers Weekly called the novel James' "most enticing work to date, replete with sizzling romance and riveting characters". Kathe Robin's review in Romantic Times predicted that "readers will be hooked from beginning to end". Kirkus named it a "compelling and passionate book" that was "emotionally rewarding and elegantly written". In USA Today, Madeline Hunter wrote that "readers will be enthralled by Lady X and Thorn Dautry as soon as they meet these two willful, formidable characters."

The novel garnered two nominations for the 2014 Romantic Times Awards, for Book for the Year and British Isles-set Historical Romance. Kirkus named it one of the Best Fiction Books of 2014. It reached number 11 on the New York Times Bestseller List for mass-market paperbacks and number 37 on the USA Today Best-selling books list.
