= Eloisa James =

American academic

Mary Bly
- Born: 1962 (age 63–64); Minnesota, U.S.
- Education: Harvard University (BA); Oxford University (M.Phil); Yale University (PhD)
- Occupations: Professor, novelist
- Spouse: Alessandro Vettori
- Children: 2
- Relatives: Robert Bly (father); Carol Bly (mother)
- Writing career
- Pen name: Eloisa James
- Period: 1999–present
- Genres: Historical romance, specifically regency romance and Georgian romance nonfiction
- Subject: English literature
- Notable work: Seduced by a Pirate
- Notable awards: RITA award – Romance Novella; 2013 Seduced by a Pirate
- Website: eloisajames.com

Eloisa James is the pen name of Mary Bly (born 1962). She is a tenured Shakespeare professor at Fordham University who also writes best-selling Regency and Georgian romance novels under her pen name. Her novels are published in 30 countries and have sold approximately 7 million copies worldwide. She also wrote a bestselling memoir about the year her family spent in France, Paris in Love.

She is the daughter of poet Robert Bly and short-story author Carol Bly.

== Early life and education ==
Mary Bly was born in Minnesota in 1962, the daughter of Robert Bly, winner of the American Book Award for poetry, and Carol Bly, a short story author. She was the inspiration for her mother's essay "The Maternity Wing, Madison, Minnesota", which was published in the anthology Imagining Home: Writing From the Midwest. Her godfather, James Wright, wrote a poem for her, which he included in his Pulitzer Prize-winning Collected Poems. She has three younger siblings, Bridget, Noah, and Micah.

The Bly family did not own a television but did own more than 5,000 books. Robert often read to his children, exposing them to classics such as Beowulf. Even at a young age, however, Bly was fascinated with romance. Throughout her childhood, she wrote and produced plays, using her siblings as the cast, and charging admission to any adults in the household (poets came often, visiting her father). The plays always ended in a romance, if only because her sister insisted on being a princess. To entertain her siblings during a snowstorm, she once wrote and built a puppet show, complete with lights, that also featured a romance. After discovering the romance novels of Georgette Heyer in her local library, Bly convinced her father to allow her to read one romance novel for each classic novel she read.

After graduating from Harvard University, Bly went on to earn an M.Phil. from Oxford University and a Ph.D. in Renaissance studies from Yale University.

== Career ==
=== Academia ===
She is a tenured professor lecturing on William Shakespeare at Fordham University in New York City. She has served as director of graduate studies in the English Department, as well as head of Fordham's Creative Writing Program and, in 2018 and 2019, associate dean of Fordham College at Lincoln Center. She specializes in bawdy puns found in English boys' plays written between 1600 and 1608. In addition to publishing an academic book with Oxford University Press, she has published an academic article on 17th-century drama in Publications of the Modern Language Association of America.

=== Romance novelist ===
While attending the University of Virginia on a humanities fellowship, Bly began writing romance novels. Her second career began when her husband wished to postpone having a second child until they had paid off their student loans. To speed the process, Bly followed her parents' examples and wrote a story to send to a publisher. Two publishers bid for that novel, Potent Pleasures, netting Bly an advance that paid off her student loans in full. As she was at the time an untenured professor about to publish her first academic work, Bly made the decision to publish her fiction books under a pseudonym, Eloisa James, to keep her academic life separate from her fiction writing. She has written 30 novels, 27 of which were New York Times bestsellers. Her books have since been translated into 28 languages and 30 countries and have become hardcover bestsellers in the Netherlands and Spain.

Bly's first three novels, the Pleasures Trilogy, were published in hardcover by Dell, a plan with which Bly did not fully agree. Following the publication of those three novels, she bought out the remainder of her contract and moved to Avon, where her books are now published in mass market paperback format. She believed that marketing her first works as hardcovers was not a truly successful plan and hoped to have more success with the mass-market paperbacks.

The inspiration for her novels comes in part from her academic career, as plays or facts discovered during her academic research often spark ideas for fictional plots. Her novels, which are set in England's Regency period (1811–1820) or Georgian period (1740–1837), often have references to Shakespeare or include pieces of 16th-century poetry or other tidbits she has found while researching her academic papers. As she spends much of her day teaching about or reading early British English, she feels that the language choices she makes in her novels are more authentic. Although Bly has attempted to write a contemporary romance, she chose not to finish the manuscript because of difficulty writing in a contemporary voice.

The characters in Bly's novels often dispense with the typical romance novel stereotypes, with characters that care about religion and a focus on historical accuracy. Her heroines are usually surrounded by very good female friends or sisters. Most of her novels are part of a trilogy or set of four novels that focus on a set of interconnected characters, and explores the relationships between those characters as well as that of the hero and heroine.

In 2018, Apple Books included her novel, Too Wilde to Wed, on its list of 10 Best Books of 2018.

=== Dual careers ===
For several years Bly's second career remained a secret, and she disguised herself by wearing contacts instead of her typical glasses when she attended functions as Eloisa James. After her first New York Times bestseller in 2005, Bly realized that her readers liked her writing regardless of its genre, and that by keeping her identity a secret she was implying that she was ashamed of her work and of her readers. At a February 16, 2005 faculty meeting, Bly outed herself to her colleagues, revealing her alter ego and offering copies of her novels to her fellow professors. Once she had officially "come out", she submitted an op-ed to The New York Times defending the romance genre. She was invited to speak at the National Book Festival in 2012.

Bly credits her success in dual careers to being "very, very organized". Lacking the time to write every day, Bly often writes upwards of 20 pages at a time. On her days at home, Bly schedules time to work on both her fiction and her academic works. When possible, she does not work when her children are at home. Bly usually does not teach in the summers, giving her more time to devote to her writing (both academic and fiction).

== Personal life ==
Bly's father and stepmother, Ruth, are very supportive of her romance writing. Carol Bly also supported her daughter, contributing a "nifty crossword puzzle" to the Eloisa James website.

Bly's mother died from ovarian cancer. Collaborating with her publisher, Avon, an imprint of HarperCollins, she became a spokesperson, along with six other Avon Romance authors, in a program named K.I.S.S. and TEAL to increase awareness about the early symptoms of this disease.

Bly is married to Alessandro Vettori, an Italian knight (or cavaliere) who is also a professor of Italian at Rutgers University, whom she met on a blind date while she was at Yale. They have a son and a daughter. The family lives primarily in New York but spends summers in Tuscany visiting Alessandro's mother and sister.

== Bibliography ==
=== Academic works as Mary Bly ===
- Bly, Mary (2000). Queer virgins and virgin queans on the early modern stage. Oxford: Oxford UP. pp. viii+213. ISBN 0-19-818699-1.

=== Romance novels as Eloisa James ===
==== The Wildes of Lindow Castle Series ====
1. Wilde in Love. Avon. October 2017. ISBN 978-0062389473.
2. Too Wilde to Wed. Avon. May 2018. ISBN 978-0062692467.
3. Born to be Wilde. Avon. July 2018. ISBN 978-0062692474.
4. Say No to the Duke. Avon. June 2019. ISBN 978-0062877826.
5. Say Yes to the Duke. Avon. May 2020. ISBN 978-0062878069.
6. Wilde Child. Avon. March 2021. ISBN 9780062878076

==== The Pleasures Trilogy ====
1. Potent Pleasures. Random House Publishing Group. September 2009 [1999]. ISBN 978-0-440-24563-6.
2. Midnight Pleasures. Random House Publishing Group. September 2009 [2000]. ISBN 978-0-440-24564-3.
3. Enchanting Pleasures. Dell. 2002 [2001]. ISBN 0-440-23458-1.

==== The Duchess in Love Series ====
1. Duchess in Love. Avon. 2002. ISBN 978-0-06-050810-4.
2. Fool For Love. Avon. 2003. ISBN 978-0-06-050811-1.
3. A Wild Pursuit. Avon. 2004. ISBN 978-0-06-050812-8.
4. Your Wicked Ways. Avon. 2004. ISBN 978-0-06-056078-2.

==== The Essex Sisters Series ====
1. Much Ado About You. Avon. 2005. ISBN 978-0-06-073206-6.
2. Kiss Me, Annabel. Avon. 2005. ISBN 978-0-06-073210-3.
3. The Taming of the Duke. Avon. 2006. ISBN 978-0-06-078158-3.
4. Pleasure for Pleasure. Avon. 2006. ISBN 978-0-06-078192-7.

==== The Desperate Duchesses Series ====
1. Desperate Duchesses. Avon. 2007. ISBN 978-0-06-078193-4.
2. An Affair Before Christmas. Avon. 2007. ISBN 978-0-06-124554-1.
3. Duchess by Night. Avon. 2008. ISBN 978-0-06-124557-2.
4. When the Duke Returns. Avon. 2008. ISBN 978-0-06-124560-2.
5. This Duchess of Mine. Avon. 2009. ISBN 978-0-06-162682-1.
6. A Duke of Her Own. Avon. 2009. ISBN 978-0-06-162683-8.
7. Three Weeks With Lady X. Avon. 2014.
8. Four Nights With a Duke. Avon. 2015.
9. Seven Minutes in Heaven. Avon. 2017.

==== Novellas in anthologies in collaboration ====
- "A Fool Again". The One That Got Away. with Victoria Alexander, Liz Carlyle and Cathy Maxwell. Harper Collins. 2004. ISBN 0-06-054026-5.
- "A Proper Englishwoman". Talk of the Ton. with Rebecca Hagan Lee and Julia London. National Geographic Books. 2005. ISBN 0-425-23051-1.
- Lady Most Likely. with Julia Quinn and Connie Brockway. HarperCollins. 2010. ISBN 978-0-06-124782-8.
- James, Eloisa (2016). A Gentleman Never Tells. HarperCollins. ISBN 978-0062573087.
- To Wed a Rake.

==== The Fairy Tales Series ====
- A Kiss at Midnight. Avon. 2010. ISBN 978-0-06-206052-5.
- When Beauty Tamed the Beast. Avon. 2011. ISBN 978-0-06-202127-4.
- The Duke is Mine. Avon. 2012. ISBN 978-0-06-202128-1.
- The Ugly Duchess. Avon. 2012. ISBN 978-0-06-202173-1.
- Seduced by a Pirate. Avon. 2012. ISBN 978-0-06-225991-2.
- Once Upon a Tower. Avon. 2013. ISBN 978-0-06-222387-6.

==== Single novel ====
- My American Duchess. 2016.

=== Memoir as Eloisa James ===
- Paris in Love. Random House. 2012. ISBN 978-1-4000-6956-9.

== Awards and reception ==
- 2013 - Romance Writers of America RITA Award, Romance Novella – Seduced by a Pirate
