= A Wrong Turning in American Poetry =

1963 literary essay by Robert Bly

"A Wrong Turning in American Poetry" is an essay by United States poet Robert Bly which was first published in Choice magazine in 1963 and collected in American Poetry: Wildness and Domesticity. It has subsequently been anthologized in Twentieth-Century American Poetics. In the essay, Bly found all Modern and contemporary American verse (up until he was writing his essay in 1963) to be lacking in spirituality and what he termed "inwardness." He also argued that the vast majority of American poets were cut off from the unconscious mind, that their verse was prosaic and lacked "imagination", and that they viewed the world in materialistic, strictly intellectual, and overly objective, "impersonal" terms.

Bly made his argument by comparing examples of verse by European and South American poets and some medieval Arabic poems (which he likes) with Modernist and contemporary American examples (which he dislikes). He criticized most American poetry from 1917 to 1963, beginning with the generation of Modernist poets that included T.S. Eliot, Ezra Pound, William Carlos Williams, H.D. and Marianne Moore; then he also vehemently attacked the postwar generation of American poets, specifically citing Robert Lowell, Elizabeth Bishop, Randall Jarrell, John Ciardi, Charles Olson, Karl Shapiro, John Berryman, and Delmore Schwartz, all of whom he claimed were negatively influenced by the previous generation. The only American poets from these groups whom he exempted from his critique were Hart Crane and Theodore Roethke.

Bly criticized Eliot's idea of the objective correlative as emblematic of everything wrong with the Modernist approach to poetry. He wrote that these poets "have more trust in the objective, outer world than in the inner world" and that this made their poetry essentially soulless. He contrasted the Modernists' "scientific" approach with the poetry and ideas of European poets like Federico García Lorca and Rainer Maria Rilke. Bly believed that "Eliot and Pound conceive maturity [in a poet] as a growth of outwardness" which Bly believes is dehumanizing. In sharp contrast, he noted that Rainer Maria Rilke advised that a poet should focus on their inner lives and always strive to "go into yourself", and this was the aesthetic path that Bly insisted was the only path that poets could take in order to write worthwhile poetry.

Some of the great, European and South American poets who Bly believed followed this path in their writing and were the models that American poets should be imitating (instead of the Modernists) included Pablo Neruda, Stéphane Mallarmé, César Vallejo, Juan Ramón Jiménez, Antonio Machado, Lorca, and Rilke.

Some of the scholarly and stylistic approaches to poetry that he criticized over the course of his essay included The New Criticism, the Metaphysical Poets, Imagism, and Objectivism, all of which he viewed as superficial, overly outward looking, and materialistic.
