= The Sibling Society =

1996 book by Robert Bly

- Author: Robert Bly
- Language: English
- Publication date: 1996

The Sibling Society is a book by the poet, activist and author Robert Bly, published in 1996. Bly argues that modern men face difficulties caused by an inability to reach full maturity and discusses the consequences this has for the societies in which they live. The core of Bly's thesis seems to be derived from Alexander Mitscherlich's 1963 monograph, Society without the Father (Auf dem Weg zur vaterlosen Gesellschaft), for which Bly wrote an introduction to the American edition (ISBN 9780060974206).
