= Sabrina Jeffries =

American author

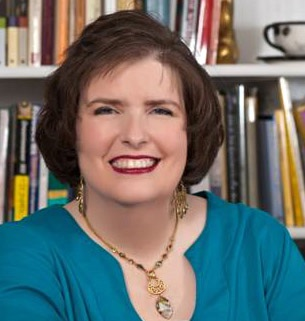
- Sabrina Jeffries
- Born: 1958 (age 67–68)
- Occupation: Novelist
- Writing career
- Pen name: Sabrina Jeffries; Deborah Martin; Deborah Nicholas
- Period: 1992–present
- Genre: romance
- Website: www.sabrinajeffries.com

Sabrina Jeffries (born 1958) is an American author of romance novels, who also writes under the pen names Deborah Martin and Deborah Nicholas. Entertainment Weekly calls her "one of the long-reigning leading voices in historical romance."

== Early life ==
When Jeffries was seven years old, her parents became missionaries and moved the family to Thailand where they lived for eleven years. She began making up her own stories when she was twelve.

Jeffries earned a Ph.D. in English, writing her dissertation on James Joyce.

== Career ==
While serving as a visiting assistant professor of English at Tulane University, Jeffries attempted to develop an academic work from her dissertation. Bored with this attempt, she began writing a romance novel instead.

After realizing that she enjoyed writing more than teaching, Jeffries left the academic world to work as a technical writer, while writing novels at night. Although her first attempt did not sell, after ten rejections Jeffries's second book was finally picked up by Leisure.

She has published historical romances as both Sabrina Jeffries and Deborah Martin, and contemporary paranormal romantic suspense as Deborah Nicholas.

Her novels Beware a Scot's Revenge and Let Sleeping Rogues Lie became New York Times Bestsellers.

== Awards ==
- HOLT Best Long Historical, Virginia Romance Writers for The Dangerous Lord (2000)
- Maggie Award for Best Historical Romance for The Dangerous Lord (2000)
- Colorado Romance Writer’s Award of Excellence for Best Historical Romance for A Notorious Love (2001)
- HOLT Medallion Contest for Best Short Historical, Virginia Romance Writers for In the Prince’s Bed (2004)
- Gayle Wilson Award of Excellence for Best Historical Fiction for To Pleasure a Prince (2005)
- Best Historical K.I.S.S. Hero Award from RT Book Reviews for To Pleasure a Prince (2005)
- More than Magic award for Best Historical for One Night with a Prince (2005)
- More than Magic award for Best Historical for Never Seduce a Scoundrel (2006)
- Winter Rose Award for Excellence in Romantic Fiction for Never Seduce a Scoundrel (2006)
- Maggie Award Winner for Best Historical for Only a Duke Will Do (2006)
- K.I.S.S. Award Winner from RT Book Reviews for Don’t Bargain with the Devil (2009)
- Career Achievement Award Winner, RT Book Reviews (2009)
- HOLT Medallion Award of Merit, Virginia Romance Writers for The Truth About Lord Stoneville (2010)
- K.I.S.S. Award Winner from RT Book Reviews for To Wed A Wild Lord (2011)
- K.I.S.S. Award Winner from RT Book Reviews for How the Scoundrel Seduces (2014)

== Personal life ==
Jeffries lives in Cary, North Carolina with her husband and son Nick.

== Publications ==
=== Novels and novellas ===
==== Lord Trilogy ====
- The Pirate Lord (Avon, 1998) ISBN 978-0380797479
- The Forbidden Lord (Avon, 1999) ISBN 9780380797486
- The Dangerous Lord (Avon, 2000) ISBN 9780739409992

==== Swanlea Spinsters ====
- A Dangerous Love (Avon, 2000) ISBN 9780380809271
- A Notorious Love (Avon, 2001) ISBN 9780739419489
- After the Abduction (Avon, 2002) ISBN 9780739425718
- Dance of Seduction (Avon, 2003) ISBN 9780060092139
- Married to the Viscount (Avon, 2004) ISBN 9780739440155

==== The Royal Brotherhood ====
- In the Prince's Bed (Pocket Star, 2004) ISBN 9780743477703
- To Pleasure a Prince (Pocket Star, 2005) ISBN 9780743477710
- One Night With a Prince (Pocket Star, 2005) ISBN 9781416523857

==== School for Heiresses ====
- Never Seduce a Scoundrel (Pocket Books, 2006) ISBN 9781416516088
- Only a Duke Will Do (Pocket Books, 2006) ISBN 9781416516095
- The School for Heiresses. with Renee Bernard, Liz Carlye, Julia London, and Julia London. (Pocket Star, 2006) ISBN 9781416516118
- Ten Reasons to Stay (Pocket, 2006) ISBN 9781476731612
- Beware a Scot's Revenge (Pocket Books, 2007) ISBN 9781416516101
- Snowy Night with a Stranger. with Jane Feather and Julia London. (Pocket Star, 2008) ISBN 9781416578222
- When Sparks Fly (Pocket Books 2008) ASIN B00IWTWG8A
- Let Sleeping Rogues Lie (Pocket Books, 2008) ISBN 9781416551515
- Don't Bargain with the Devil (Pocket Books, 2009) ISBN 9781416560814
- Wed Him Before You Bed Him (Pocket Books 2009) ISBN 9781416560821

==== Hellions of Halstead Hall ====
- The Truth about Lord Stoneville (Pocket Books, 2009) ISBN 9781439167519
- A Hellion in her Bed (Pocket Star, 2010) ISBN 9781439167540
- How to Woo a Reluctant Lady (Pocket Star, 2011) ISBN 9781439167557
- To Wed a Wild Lord (Pocket Star, 2011) ISBN 9781451642407
- A Lady Never Surrenders (Pocket Books, 2012) ISBN 9781451642452
- 'Twas the Night after Christmas (Gallery Books, 2012) ISBN 9781451642469

==== The Duke's Men ====
- What the Duke Desires (Pocket Books, 2013) ISBN 9781451693461
- When the Rogue Returns (Pocket Books, 2014) ISBN 9781451693485
- Dorinda and the Doctor (Pocket Star, 2014) ASIN B00IBHS7WC
- How the Scoundrel Seduces (Pocket Books, 2014) ISBN 9781451693492
- If the Viscount Falls (Pocket Books, 2015) ISBN 9781476786049

==== Sinful Suitors ====
- The Art of Sinning (Pocket Books, 2015) ISBN 9781476786063
- The Heiress and the Hothead (Pocket Star 2016) ISBN 9781501147524
- What Happens Under the Mistletoe. with Karen Hawkins, Candace Camp, and Meredith Duran (Pocket Books, 2016) ISBN 9781476786087
- A Study of Seduction (Pocket Books, 2016) ISBN 9781476786070
- The Danger of Desire (Pocket Books, 2016) ISBN 9781501144448
- The Pleasures of Passion (Pocket Books, 2017) ISBN 9781501144462
- A Talent for Temptation (Pocket Star, 2017) ISBN 9781501144530
- The Secret of Flirting (Pocket Books, 2018) ISBN 9781501144486
- The Risk of Rogues (Pocket Star, 2018) ISBN 9781501144547

==== Duke Dynasty ====
- Project Duchess (Zebra, 2019) ISBN 9781420148558
- Seduction on a Snowy Night with Mary Putney and Madeline Hunter (Kensington, 2019) ISBN 9781496720283
- The Bachelor (Zebra, 2020) ISBN 9781420148565
- Who Wants to Marry a Duke (Zebra, 2020) ISBN 9781420148572
- Undercover Duke (Zebra, 2021) ISBN 9781420148589
- A Yuletide Kiss, with Madeline Hunter and Mary Jo Putney (Kensington, 2021) ISBN 9781496731296

==== Designing Debutantes ====
- A Duke for Diana (Zebra, 2022) ISBN 978-1-4201-5377-4

Lords of Hazard

- Hazardous to a Duke's Heart (Kensington, 2025) ISBN 978-1-4967-5102-7

=== Short fiction ===
- The French Maid (Pocket Books, 2012) ISBN 9781451669466
- Closer Than They Appear (BelleBooks, 2014) ISBN 9781611945317
- Gone but not Forgotten (BelleBooks, 2014) ISBN 9781611945300

=== Included in anthologies and collections ===
- One Night with a Rogue (St. Martin's Paperbacks,1995) ISBN 9780312956110
- A Dance with the Devil (St. Martin's Press1997) ISBN 9780312963187
- "The Widow's Auction." in Fantasy (Penguin, 2006) ISBN 9780515132762
- At Home in Mossy Creek (BelleBooks, 2007) ISBN 9780976876083
- "An April Fool's Forbidden Affair," Premiere: A Romance Writers of America® Collection (Romance Writers of America, 2014) ISBN 9780986228209

=== As Deborah Martin ===
==== Novels ====
- Moonlight Enchantment (Leisure Books, 1992) ISBN 9780843932294
- Creole Nights (Leisure Books, 1992) ISBN 9780843933680
- Dangerous Angel (Topaz, 1994) ISBN 9780451405289
- Creole Bride (Topaz, 1997) ISBN 9780451408167

===== Restoration =====
- By Love Unveiled (Topaz, 1993) ISBN 9780451403629
- Silver Deceptions (Topaz, 1994) ISBN 9780451404343

===== Wales =====
- Windswept (Topaz, 1995) ISBN 9780451405296
- Stormswept (Topaz, 1996) ISBN 9780451405296

=== As Deborah Nicholas ===
==== Novels ====
- Night Vision (Dell, 1993) ISBN 9780440213512
- Silent Sonata (Dell, 1994) ISBN 9780440213543
- Shattered Reflections (Zebra, 1996) ISBN 9780821750766
