= Victoria Alexander =

American author

- Born: 1953 (age 72–73); Washington, D.C., U.S.
- Children: 2
- Writing career
- Pen name: Victoria Alexander; Chery Griffin
- Language: English
- Period: 1995–present
- Website: www.victoriaalexander.com

Victoria Alexander (born 1953) is an American author of historical romance novels. She has been nominated for the Romantic Times Reviewers' Choice Award four times, winning once, for A Visit From Sir Nicholas, which Romantic Times described as "overflowing with heart-tugging scenes, simmering sexual tension, marvelous characters and meaningful lessons about life and love. " Alexander has also won a Romantic Times Career Achievement Award.

On September 4, 2007, Avon Books released Alexander's newest novel, Lady Amelia's Secret Lover, as an e-book original, including an embedded video with Alexander's comments about the plot and characters.

== Life ==
Alexander was born in Washington D.C., grew up as an "Air Force brat", and travelled the world at a young age. She now lives in Omaha, Nebraska with her husband and two dogs. She has a two grown children.

== Bibliography ==
=== Millworth Manor ===
1. What Happens at Christmas (2012)
2. The Importance of Being Wicked (2013)
3. The Scandalous Adventures of the Sister of the Bride (2014)
4. The Shocking Secret of a Guest at the Wedding (2014)
5. The Daring Exploits of a Runaway Heiress (2015)

=== Lady’s Travelers Society ===
1. The Lady Travelers Guide to Scoundrels and Other Gentlemen (2017)
2. The Lady Travelers Guide to Larceny with a Dashing Stranger (2018)
3. The Lady Travelers Guide to Deception with an Unlikely Earl (2018)
4. The Lady Travelers Guide to Happily Ever After (2019)

=== Effington Family ===
1. The Wedding Bargain (1999)
2. The Husband List (2000)
3. The Marriage Lesson (2001)
4. The Prince's Bride (2001)
5. Her Highness, My Wife (2002)
6. Love with the Proper Husband (2003)
7. The Lady in Question (2003)
8. The Pursuit of Marriage (2004)
9. A Visit from Sir Nicholas (2004)
10. When We Meet Again (2005)
11. Let It Be Love (2005)

=== Last Man Standing ===
1. A Little Bit Wicked (2006)
2. What a Lady Wants (2007)
3. Secrets of a Proper Lady (2007)
4. Seduction of a Proper Gentleman (2008)

=== Harrington Brothers ===
1. The Perfect Wife (1997)
2. The Virgin's Secret (2009)
3. Desires of a Perfect Lady (2010)

=== Sinful Family Secrets ===
1. His Mistress By Christmas (2011)
2. My Wicked Little Lies (2012)

=== Novels ===
- Yesterday and Forever (1995)
- The Perfect Wife (1996)
- Princess and the Pea (1996)
- Emperor's New Clothes (1997)
- Believe (1998)
- Play It Again Sam (1998)
- Paradise Bay (1999)
- The Perfect Mistress (2011)
- What Happens At Christmas (2011)

=== Omnibus ===
- The Night Before Christmas: Promises to Keep / Naughty or Nice / Santa Reads Romance / Gift for Santa (1996) (with Sandra Hill, Dara Joy and Nelle McFather)
- Santa Paws (1997) (with Nina Coombs, Annie Kimberlin and Miriam Raftery)
- The Cat's Meow (1998) (with Nina Coombs, Coral Smith Saxe and Colleen Shannon)
- Secrets of a Perfect Night (2000) (with Rachel Gibson and Stephanie Laurens)
- The One That Got Away (2004) (with Liz Carlyle, Eloisa James and Cathy Maxwell)
