= Four Nights With the Duke =

Book by Eloisa James

Four Nights with the Duke
- First edition
- Author: Eloisa James
- Language: English
- Genre: Romance novel
- Publisher: Avon
- Publication date: March 31, 2015
- Publication place: United States
- Media type: Paperback
- ISBN: 978-0-06-234428-1
- Preceded by: Three Weeks With Lady X

Four Nights with the Duke is a historical romance novel written by Eloisa James. It was published on March 31, 2015, by Avon and debuted on the New York Times bestseller list at number 6.

== Background and publication ==
Four Nights with the Duke is a sequel to James's 2014 novel, Three Weeks With Lady X. These two novels are technically part of James's Desperate Duchesses series.

According to James, her novels take about a year to write. She penned Four Nights with the Duke while living in London. James based the heroine partly on her own younger self, "a plump, funny wallflower with a secret career writing romances".

The novel was released by Avon on March 31, 2015. Readers who pre-ordered the novel were sent an additional ten pages of text that was cut from the novel. The extra chapter revolved around the protagonists of Three Weeks With Lady X.

== Plot summary ==
The protagonists of the novel, Mia Carrington and Evander "Vander" Brody, were childhood acquaintances whose parents were involved in a long-term affair. The prologue details Mia's humiliation when, at age 15, another acquaintance ridicules her for writing a love poem to Vander.

Thirteen years later, both are still single. Vander is now the Duke of Pindar, but eschews polite society to train racehorses at his estate. Mia is a very successful romance novelist, writing under a pen name. After her fiancé leaves her at the altar, Mia is desperate. If she does not marry within the month, custody of her crippled nephew, Charlie, will revert to his evil uncle. Seeing few options for herself, Mia blackmails Vander into marriage. In a fit of anger, he announces he will grant her only four nights per year; Mia agrees to those terms.

After the ceremony, Vander learns that Mia intends the marriage to be temporary. By now intrigued by her and quickly becoming attached to Charlie, Vander refuses to grant her an annulment. He insists on his four nights, and soon finds himself in love with his new wife.

== Reception ==
Reviewers compared the novel very favorably to Three Weeks With Lady X. A review in Kirkus Reviews highlighted the complex plot and richly drawn secondary characters and praised James for improving her storytelling abilities even further. The novel was a Romantic Times Top Pick, with a rating of 4.5 out of 5 stars.

The book debuted on the USA Today bestseller list at number 14 and on the New York Times Bestseller list for mass-market fiction at number 6.
