= Esther de Cáceres =

Uruguayan poet and writer

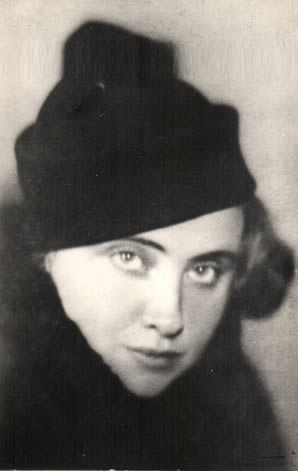
- Born: 1903; Montevideo, Uruguay
- Died: February 3, 1971 (aged 67–68); Montevideo, Uruguay
- Occupation: Poet

Esther de Cáceres (1903 – February 3, 1971) was a poet and writer from Uruguay.

== Life ==
Cáceres was born in Montevideo in 1903. She qualified as a doctor in Montevideo. She then taught humanities to trainee teachers whilst becoming part of the intelligentsia of Montevideo. In 1929 she published Las ínsulas extrañas and in 1931 Canción. She published several other books of poetry including Concierto de amor y otros poemas which had an introduction by Gabriela Mistral in 1951.

Cáceres died in Montevideo in 1971.
