= Robert Bly =

American poet, author, and activist (1926–2021)

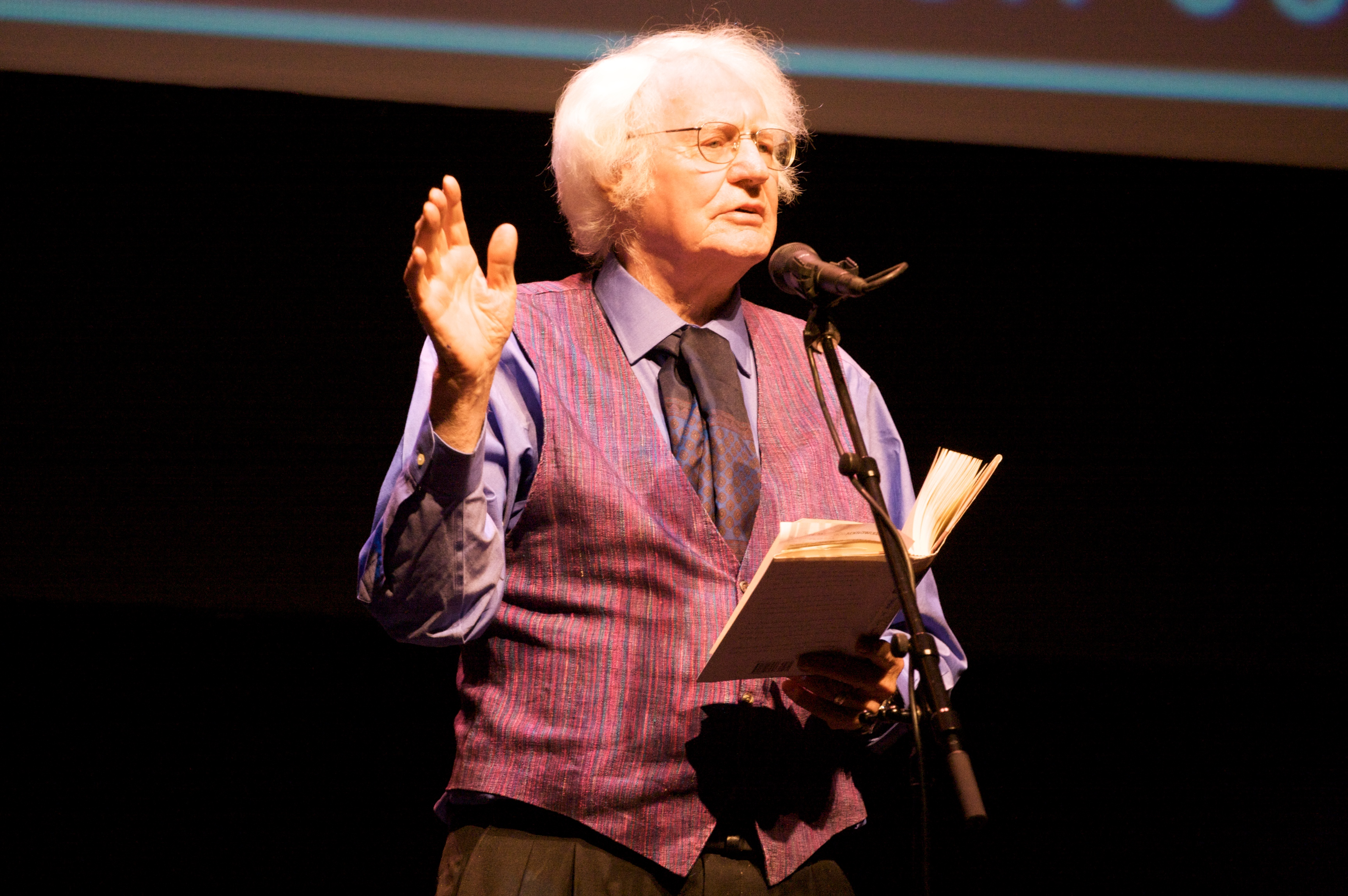
- Bly at the "Poetry Out Loud" finals, Minnesota 2009
- Born: Robert Elwood Bly; December 23, 1926; Lac qui Parle County, Minnesota, U.S.
- Died: November 21, 2021 (aged 94); Minneapolis, Minnesota, U.S.
- Education: Harvard University (BA); University of Iowa (MFA)
- Occupations: Poet; activist
- Spouses: Carol McLean (m. 1955; div. 1979) Ruth Counsell (m. 1980)
- Children: 4, including Mary Bly
- Writing career
- Period: 1962–2018
- Subjects: Masculinity
- Notable works: Iron John: A Book About Men; Silence in the Snowy Fields; The Light Around the Body
- Movements: Deep image; Mythopoetic Men's Movement
- Website: robertbly.com

Robert Elwood Bly (December 23, 1926 – November 21, 2021) was an American poet, essayist, activist and leader of the mythopoetic men's movement. His best-known prose book is Iron John: A Book About Men (1990), which spent 62 weeks on The New York Times Best Seller list, and is a key text of the mythopoetic men's movement. He won the 1968 National Book Award for Poetry for his book The Light Around the Body.

== Early life and education ==
Bly was born in Lac qui Parle County, Minnesota, the son of Alice Aws and Jacob Thomas Bly, who were of Norwegian ancestry. Following graduation from high school in 1944, he enlisted in the United States Navy, serving two years. After one year at St. Olaf College in Minnesota, he transferred to Harvard University, joining other young persons who became known as writers: Donald Hall, Will Morgan, Adrienne Rich, Kenneth Koch, Frank O'Hara, John Ashbery, Harold Brodkey, George Plimpton and John Hawkes. He graduated in 1950 and spent the next few years in New York.

Beginning in 1954, Bly studied for two years at the University of Iowa at the Iowa Writers' Workshop, completing a master's degree in fine arts, along with W. D. Snodgrass, Donald Justice, and others. In 1956, he received a Fulbright Grant to travel to Norway and translate Norwegian poetry into English. While there, he became acquainted with the work of a number of major international poets whose work was barely known in the United States. These included both Norwegians and writers from Spain, Latin America, Middle East, and elsewhere, among them Gunnar Ekelof, Harry Martinson, Georg Trakl, Antonio Machado, Pablo Neruda, Cesar Vallejo, Rumi, Hafez, Kabir, and Mirabai. He also connected with some of his family's relations.

== Personal life ==
Bly lived on a farm in Minnesota with his wife Carol (née McLean), whom he married in 1955, and their four children. Carol Bly was also a writer, winning awards for her short stories and novels. Robert and Carol divorced in 1979. Their daughter Mary Bly is a professor at Fordham University and author of romance novels under the pseudonym Eloisa James. In 1980, Robert Bly married Ruth Counsell and became the stepfather to her two children. In 2012, his daughter Mary told Minnesota Public Radio that he had Alzheimer's disease. Bly died at his home in Minneapolis on November 21, 2021, at the age of 94.

== Career ==
Bly's early collection of poems, Silence in the Snowy Fields, was published in 1962. Its plain, imagistic style had considerable influence on American verse of the next two decades. The following year, he published "A Wrong Turning in American Poetry", an essay in which he argued that the vast majority of American poetry from 1917 to 1963 was lacking in soul and "inwardness" as a result of a focus on impersonality and an objectifying, intellectual view of the world. Bly believed this approach was instigated by the Modernists and formed the aesthetic of most post-World War II American poetry. He criticized the influence of American-born Modernists such as T. S. Eliot, Ezra Pound, Marianne Moore, and William Carlos Williams, and argued that American poetry needed to model itself on the more inward-looking work of European and South American poets like Pablo Neruda, César Vallejo, Juan Ramón Jiménez, Antonio Machado, and Rainer Maria Rilke. A Selected Poems translation of Rilke from the German, with Commentary by Bly, was published in 1981. Times Alone, Selected Poems of Antonio Machado, with facing page Spanish/English translation, was published in 1983.

In 1966, Bly co-founded American Writers Against the Vietnam War and was among the leaders of the opposition to that war among writers. In 1968, he signed the "Writers and Editors War Tax Protest" pledge, vowing to refuse tax payments in protest against the war. In his speech accepting the 1968 National Book Award for The Light Around the Body, he announced that he would be contributing the $1000 prize to draft resistance organizations.

During the sixties Bly aided the Bengali Hungryalist poets who faced anti-establishment trials at Kolkata, India. Bly's 1970 poem "The Teeth Mother Naked at Last", later collected in his book Sleepers Joining Hands (1973), is a major contribution to anti-war poetry of the Vietnam War era. During the 1970s, he published eleven books of poetry, essays, and translations. He celebrated the power of myth, Indian ecstatic poetry, meditation, and storytelling. During the 1980s he published Loving a Woman in Two Worlds, The Wingéd Life: Selected Poems and Prose of Thoreau, The Man in the Black Coat Turns, and A Little Book on the Human Shadow.

Perhaps his most famous work is Iron John: A Book About Men (1990). This became an international bestseller and has been translated into many languages; it is credited with inspiring the Mythopoetic men's movement in the United States.

Bly frequently conducted workshops for men, together with James Hillman, Michael J. Meade, and others, as well as workshops for men and women with Marion Woodman. He maintained a friendly correspondence with Clarissa Pinkola Estés, author of Women Who Run with the Wolves. Bly wrote The Maiden King: The Reunion of Masculine and Feminine with Marion Woodman. He published a poetry anthology titled The Rag and Bone Shop of the Heart (1992), with James Hillman and Michael Meade co-editing.

=== Great Mother Conference ===
In 1975, Bly organized a Great Mother Conference. Throughout the nine-day event, poetry, music, and dance were practiced to examine human consciousness. The conference has been held annually; since 2003 in Nobleboro, Maine. In the early years, one of its major themes was the goddess or "Great Mother", as she has been known throughout human history. Much of Bly's collection Sleepers Joining Hands (1973) is concerned with this theme. In the context of the Vietnam War, a focus on the divine feminine was seen as urgent and necessary. Since that time, the Conference has expanded its topics to consider a wide variety of poetic, mythological, and fairy tale traditions. In the 1980s and 1990s, there was much discussion among the conference community about the changes which contemporary men were going through, so "The New Father" was added to the Conference title. Bly stopped attending after 2010.

== Awards and legacy ==
Bly was the University of Minnesota Library's 2002 Distinguished Writer. He received the McKnight Foundation's Distinguished Artist Award in 2000, and the Maurice English Poetry Award in 2002. He has published more than 40 collections of poetry, edited many others, and published translations of poetry and prose from such languages as Swedish, Norwegian, German, Spanish, Persian and Urdu. His book The Night Abraham Called to the Stars was nominated for a Minnesota Book Award. He also edited the prestigious Best American Poetry 1999 (Scribners).

In 2006 the University of Minnesota purchased Bly's archive, which contained more than 80,000 pages of handwritten manuscripts; a journal spanning nearly 50 years; notebooks of his "morning poems"; drafts of translations; hundreds of audio and videotapes, and correspondence with many writers such as James Wright, Donald Hall and James Dickey. The archive is housed at Elmer L. Andersen Library on the University of Minnesota campus. The university paid $775,000 from school funds and private donors.

In February 2008, Bly was named Minnesota's first poet laureate. In that year he also contributed a poem and an Afterword to From the Other World: Poems in Memory of James Wright. In February 2013, he was awarded the Robert Frost Medal, a lifetime achievement recognition given by the Poetry Society of America.

== Translation ==
Bly's willingness to collaborate with others is especially evident in his extensive translation work. Working with people knowledgeable about the poet's native language, Bly applies his craft as a poet to creating a non-literal, poetic translation. The poets that interest him most embody his idea of "Leaping Poetry", explained in 1972's Leaping Poetry: An Idea with Poems and Translations Chosen by Robert Bly. The poets he chooses in the book as examples of this leaping poetry included Federico García Lorca, Cesar Vallejo, Pablo Neruda, Rainer Maria Rilke and Tomas Tranströmer. He says:

My idea, then, is that a great work of art often has at its center a long floating leap, around which the work of art in ancient times used to gather itself like steel shavings around the magnet. But a work of art does not necessarily have at its center a single long floating leap. The work can have many leaps, perhaps shorter. The real joy of poetry is to experience this leaping inside a poem. A poet who is "leaping" makes a jump from an object soaked in unconscious psychic substance to an object or idea soaked in conscious psychic substance. What is marvellous is to see this leaping return in poetry of this century.

News of the Universe: Poems of Twofold Consciousness is a collection of poetry from around the world in 1995. In the introductory note Bly explains the book was requested by Sierra Club Books, and was to be poems relating to ecology. He begins the book with seven poems he calls "The Old Position", which are poems from the 18th century which "dismissed nature as defective because it lacks reason". The next part is the "Attack on the Old Position", followed by four more sections, and all non-English poets are translated by Bly. The Winged Energy of Delight, Selected Translations (2004) includes poets translated in Leaping Poetry, along with translations from Japanese, Spanish, Arabic and other world poets.

Bly's interest in Eastern ecstatic poetry flowered with the publication in 1971 of The Kabir Book, Forty-four of the Ecstatic Poems of Kabir. It was a compilation of poems previously published in a variety of journals, reviews, and magazines. In 1981, Yellow Moon Press published Night and Sleep, which contained translations of Rumi by Coleman Barks and Robert Bly. Barks collaborated with John Moyne and his literal Persian translations. Bly worked with translations from the Persian original by A.J. Arberry and Reynold A. Nicholson. A book translating Mirabai followed in 2004, co-authored with Jane Hirshfield, with an afterword by John Stratton Hawley. In 2001, The Night Abraham Called to the Stars published Bly's celebration of the ghazal, of which the cover flap says "Bly offers Western readers the opportunity to experience the thrilling leaps that the ghazal allows." In 2008, The Angels Knocking on the Tavern Door gave us thirty poems by Hafez translated by Bly and noted Islamic scholar Leonard Lewisohn.

== Thought and the Men's Movement ==
Much of Bly's prose writing focuses on what he saw as the particularly troubled situation in which many males find themselves today. He understood this to be a result of, among other things, the decline of traditional fathering which left young boys unguided through the stages of life leading to maturity. He claimed that in contrast with women who are better informed by their bodies (notably by the beginning and end of their menstrual cycle), men need to be actively guided out of boyhood and into manhood by their elders. Pre-modern cultures had elaborate myths, often enacted as rites of passage, as well as "men's societies" where older men would teach young boys about these gender-specific issues. As modern fathers have become increasingly absent, this knowledge is no longer being passed down the generations, resulting in what he referred to as a Sibling Society. The "Absence of the Father" is a recurrent theme in Bly's work and according to him, many of the phenomena of depression, juvenile delinquency and lack of leadership in business and politics are linked to it.

Bly therefore saw today's men as half-adults, trapped between boyhood and maturity, in a state where they find it hard to become responsible in their work as well as leaders in their communities. Eventually they might become weak or absent fathers themselves which will cause this behaviour to be passed down to their children. In his book The Sibling Society (1997), Bly argues that a society formed of such men is inherently problematic as it lacks creativity and a deep sense of empathy. The image of half-adults is further reinforced by popular culture which often portrays fathers as naive, overweight and almost always emotionally co-dependent. Historically this represents a recent shift from a traditional patriarchal model and Bly believes that women rushed to fill the gap that was formed through the various youth movements during the 1960s, enhancing men's emotional capacities and helping them to connect with women's age-old pain of repression. It has, however, also led to the creation of "soft males" who lack the outwardly directed strength to revitalize the community with assertiveness and a certain warrior strength.

In Bly's view, a potential solution lay in the rediscovery of the meanings hidden in traditional myths and fairytales as well as works of poetry. He researched and collected myths that concern male maturity, often originating from the Grimms' Fairy Tales and published them in various books, Iron John being the best known example. In contrast to the continual pursuit of higher achievements that is constantly taught to young men today, the theme of spiritual descent (often being referred to by its Greek term κατάβασις), which is to be found in many of these myths, is presented as a necessary step for coming in contact with the deeper aspects of the masculine self and achieving its full potential. This is often presented as hero, often during the middle of his quest, going underground to pass a period of solitude and sorrow in semi-bestial mode. Bly noticed that a cultural space existed in most traditional societies for such a period in a man's life, in the absence of which, many men today go into a depression and alcoholism as they subconsciously try to emulate this innate ritual.

Bly was influenced by the Swiss psychiatrist Carl Jung, who developed the theory of archetypes, the discrete structures of the Psyche which emerge as images in dreams, myths, and art. The Powerful King, the Evil Witch and the Beautiful Maiden are, according to Jung, some of the imprints of the collective unconscious and Bly wrote extensively about their meaning and relations to modern life. As an example and in accordance with Jung, he considered the Witch to be that part of the male psyche upon which the negative and destructive side of a woman is imprinted and which first developed during infancy to store the imperfections of one's own mother. As a consequence, the Witch's symbols are essentially inverted motherly symbols, where the loving act of cooking is transformed into the brewing of evil potions and knitting clothes takes the form of spider's web. The feeding process is also reversed, with the child now in danger of being eaten to feed the body of the Witch rather than being fed by the mother's own body. In that respect, the Witch is a mark of arrested development on the part of the man as it guards against feminine realities that his psyche is not yet able to incorporate fully. Fairy tales according to this interpretation mostly describe internal battles played out externally, where the hero saves his future bride by killing a witch, as in "The Drummer" (Grimms tale 193). This particular concept is expanded in Bly's 1989 talk "The Human Shadow" and the book it presented.

== Criticism ==
In an early essay, New Formalist and New Narrative poet Dana Gioia examined the poetry career of Robert Bly, whom Gioia called "one of the most famous and most influential poets writing in America." While Gioia praised some of Bly's poetry attacking U.S. involvement in the Vietnam War, he argued that Bly's success had more to do with self promotion than with literary talent. Gioia further called Bly's free verse translations of the work of formal poets "insensitive to both the sound and nuance of the originals", and accused Bly, by encouraging "this minimal kind of translation", of having "done immense damage to American poetry." In conclusion, Gioia wrote, "Bly insists on being judged as a major poet, but his verse cannot bear the weight of that demand."

== Works ==
=== Poetry collections ===
- Like the New Moon, I Will Live My Life (White Pine Press, 2015)
- Stealing Sugar from the Castle: Selected and New Poems, 1950–2013 (W. W. Norton & Company, 2013)
- Talking into the Ear of a Donkey: Poems (W. W. Norton & Company, 2011)
- Reaching Out to the World: New & Selected Prose Poems (White Pine Press, 2009)
- Turkish Pears in August: Twenty-Four Ramages (Eastern Washington University, 2007)
- The Urge to Travel Long Distances (Eastern Washington University Press, 2005)
- My Sentence Was a Thousand Years of Joy (HarperCollins, 2005)
- Surprised by Evening (RealNewMusic, 2005)!
- The Night Abraham Called to the Stars (HarperCollins, 2001)
- Eating the Honey of Words: New and Selected Poems (1999)
- Snowbanks North of the House (1999)
- Morning Poems (1997)
- Meditations on the Insatiable Soul (1994)
- What Have I Ever Lost by Dying?: Collected Prose Poems (1992)
- Loving a Woman in Two Worlds (1985)
- Selected Poems (1986)
- Mirabai Versions (1984)
- The Man in the Black Coat Turns (1981)
- This Tree Will Be Here for a Thousand Years (1979)
- This Body is Made of Camphor and Gopherwood (1977)
- Old Man Rubbing His Eyes (1974)
- Jumping Out of Bed (1973)
- Sleepers Joining Hands (1973)
- The Light Around the Body (1967) — National Book Award
- The Lion's Tail and Eyes (1962)
- Silence in the Snowy Fields (1962)

=== Translations ===
- The Angels Knocking on the Tavern Door: Thirty Poems of Hafez (HarperCollins, 2008), with Leonard Lewisohn
- The Dream We Carry: Selected and Last Poems of Olav H. Hauge (Copper Canyon Press, 2008), with Robert Hedin
- Peer Gynt (2008) — verse play by Henrik Ibsen
- Kabir: Ecstatic Poems (Beacon Press, 2004)
- Mirabai: Ecstatic Poems, translators Bly and Jane Hirshfield (Beacon Press, 2004)
- The Winged Energy of Delight: Selected Translations (HarperCollins, 2004)
- The Half-Finished Heaven: The Best Poems of Tomas Tranströmer (Graywolf Press, 2001)
- The Lightning Should Have Fallen on Ghalib, with Sunil Dutta (1999)
- Lorca and Jiménez: Selected Poems (Beacon Press, 1997)
- Ten Poems of Francis Ponge Translated by Robert Bly & Ten Poems of Robert Bly Inspired by the Poems of Francis Ponge (1990)
- Trusting Your Life to Water and Eternity: Twenty Poems of Olav H. Hauge (1987)
- Machado's Times Alone: Selected Poems (1983)
- Selected Poems of Rainer Maria Rilke: A Translation from the German and Commentary by Robert Bly (1981)
- The Kabir Book (1977)
- Friends, You Drank Some Darkness: Three Swedish Poets: Martinson, Ekeloef, and Transtromer (1975)
- Neruda and Vallejo: Selected Poems (1971)
- Hunger (1967) — novel by Knut Hamsun

=== Anthologies (as editor) ===
- The Best American Poetry (1999)
- The Soul Is Here for Its Own Joy: Sacred Poems from Many Cultures, Ecco Press (1995)
- The Darkness Around Us Is Deep: Selected Poems of William Stafford (1993)
- The Rag and Bone Shop of the Heart: Poems for Men Co-edited with James Hillman and Michael Meade (1992)
- News of the Universe (1980)
- Leaping Poetry (1975)
- A Poetry Reading Against the Vietnam War (1967)
- The Sea and the Honeycomb (1966)

=== Nonfiction books ===
- More Than True: The Wisdom of Fairy Tales (Henry Holt & Co, 2018)
- Remembering James Wright (2005)
- The Maiden King : The Reunion of Masculine and Feminine, Bly and Marion Woodman (Henry Holt & Co, 1998)
- The Sibling Society (Addison-Wesley, 1996)
- The Spirit Boy and the Insatiable Soul (1994)
- American Poetry: Wildness and Domesticity (1991)
- Iron John: A Book About Men (1990)
- A Little Book on the Human Shadow, Bly and William Booth (1988)
- Eight Stages of Translation (1983)
- Talking All Morning:

== See also ==
- Religion and mythology
- Joseph Campbell
- Mythopoetic Men's Movement
- Deep image
