= American Writers Against the Vietnam War =

Umbrella organization

American Writers Against the Vietnam War was an umbrella organization created in 1965 by American poets Robert Bly and David Ray. The group organized readings, meetings and joined in rallies, teach-ins, and demonstrations against the Vietnam War, allowing writers to protest under a collective identity of their own. Well-known American writers who participated in A.W.A.V.W. functions included Galway Kinnell, W.S. Merwin, Allen Ginsberg, Thomas McGrath, Adrienne Rich, Grace Paley, Douglas Kent Hall, and Robert Lowell.

Bly, a charismatic performer, was a frequently seen figure on American college campuses throughout the late 1960s and the 1970s; his readings often became de facto anti-war rallies. In 1967, Bly won the National Book Award for his book of poems The Light Around the Body; he used the prize money and proceeds from the book to fund the War Resistance efforts.
