= Carlos Albert =

Spanish sculptor (born 1978)

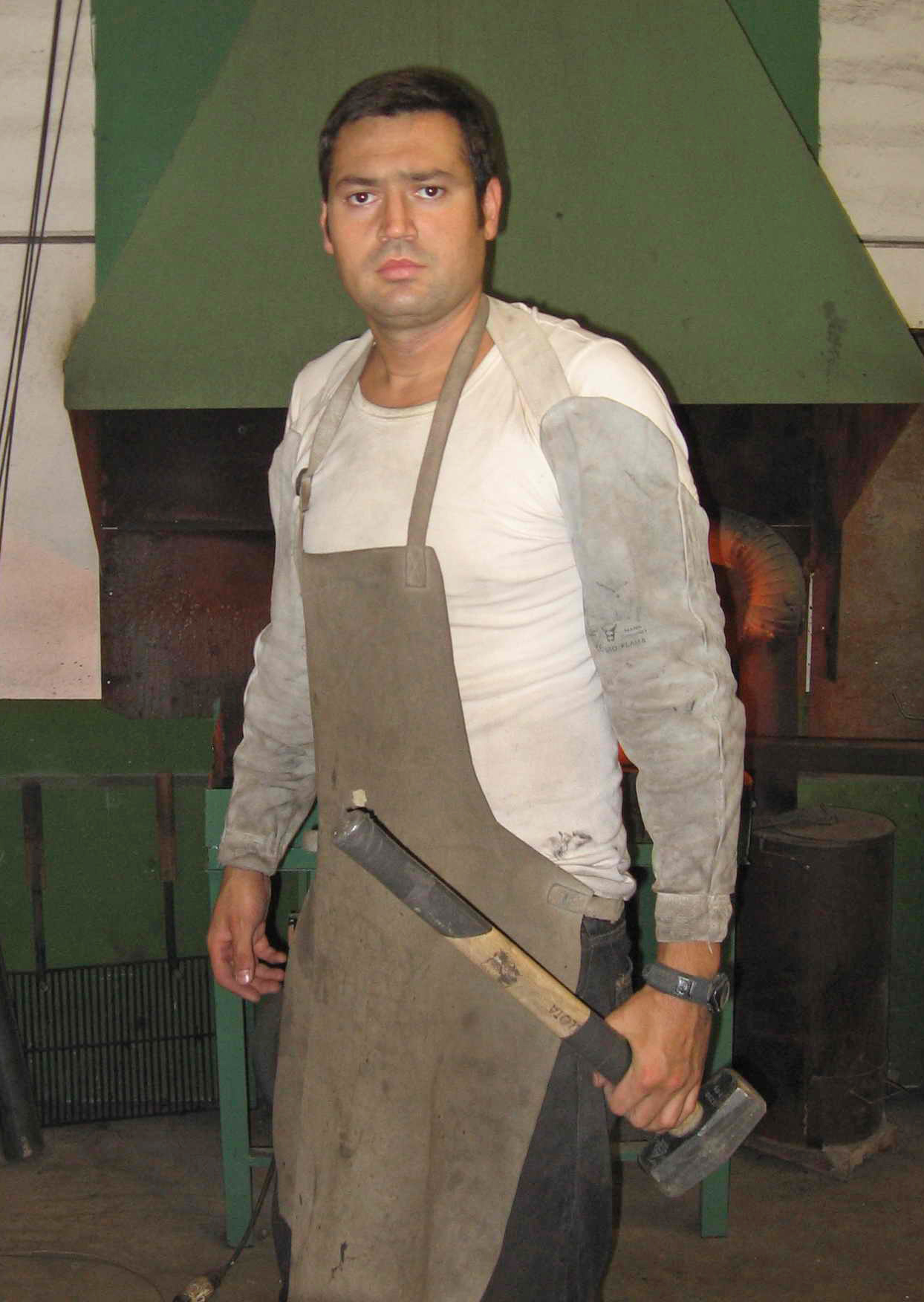
- Carlos Albert in his studio
- Born: Carlos Albert Andrés; 24 February 1978 (age 48); Madrid, Spain
- Known for: sculpture

Carlos Albert Andrés (born 24 February 1978) is a Spanish sculptor. He was one of the Group 99, whose manifesto intends to exalt the traditional values of art. Albert creates sculptural abstract art in wrought iron and weathering steel. He considers Sculpture to share many of the features of drawing, and emphasizes in his work, skill and handling of these materials, especially iron, making drawings of his pieces "three-dimensional" creating empty spaces in the masses. He believes what is evoked and suggested to the viewer is more important than what is represented.

== Biography ==
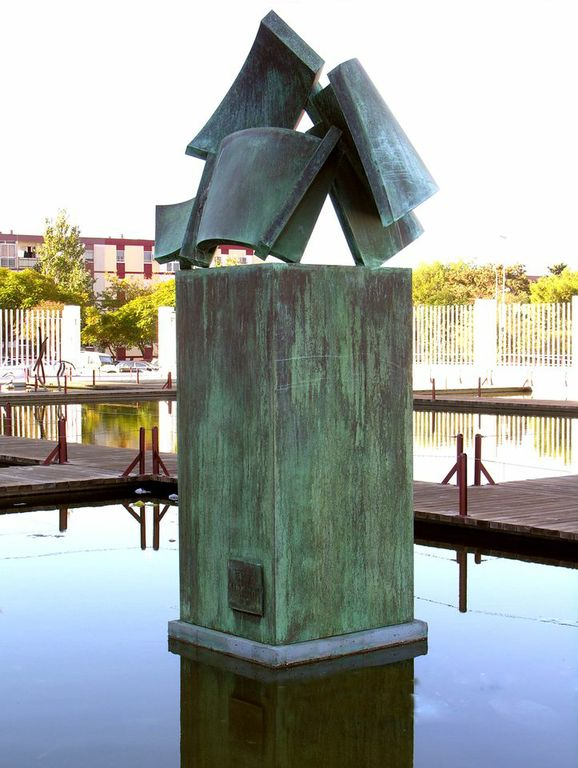
Eolo, 2006

Albert was born on 24 February 1978 in Madrid. His artistic drive started very young. In 1996 he joined the Faculty of Fine Arts at the Complutense University of Madrid and four years later, the university granted a stay of studies at Camberwell College of Arts (University of the Arts London), also enriching his artistic training. This year was key for his career, because it was exposed for the first time in an art gallery participating in the project entitled Collective Will of Iron.

In 2001 he obtained a degree in fine arts, also winning the First Prize in the Visual Arts awarded by the Faculty. That year, he obtained a grant from the Ministry of Culture of Luxembourg to take part in European Circle courses for the Propagation of the Arts, which served to expand their knowledge in the field.

Two years after his studies of fine art, he obtained the Diploma of Advanced Studies at Universidad Nebrija which represents the Art Fair Madrid, where he received several awards.

During college, Albert began with diverse materials, until wrought iron became his medium of choice. A significant moment in his artistic beginnings, was the meeting in Santander with the sculptor Martin Chirino, due to a grant from the Marcelino Botin Foundation in 1999. Working with this artist, he began training in working with forging and sculptural conception.

Albert entered into the exhibition circuit through grants from entities such as Elsa Peretti Foundation competition that in 2001, awarded the First Prize for Sculpture at the University of Seville. That year he also participated in a group exhibition in the presence of his teacher Martin Chirino. This year, marked the professional beginnings in the creation of his first monumental works, this time for the City Council of Móstoles. In 2005, after receiving a number of awards and commissions from various public and private Spanish banks, his monumental work can be seen in other public spaces in Spanish cities, such as the Door of Tolerance sculpture, measuring 15 meters high and 20 meters wide, at the entrance of the town of Parla.

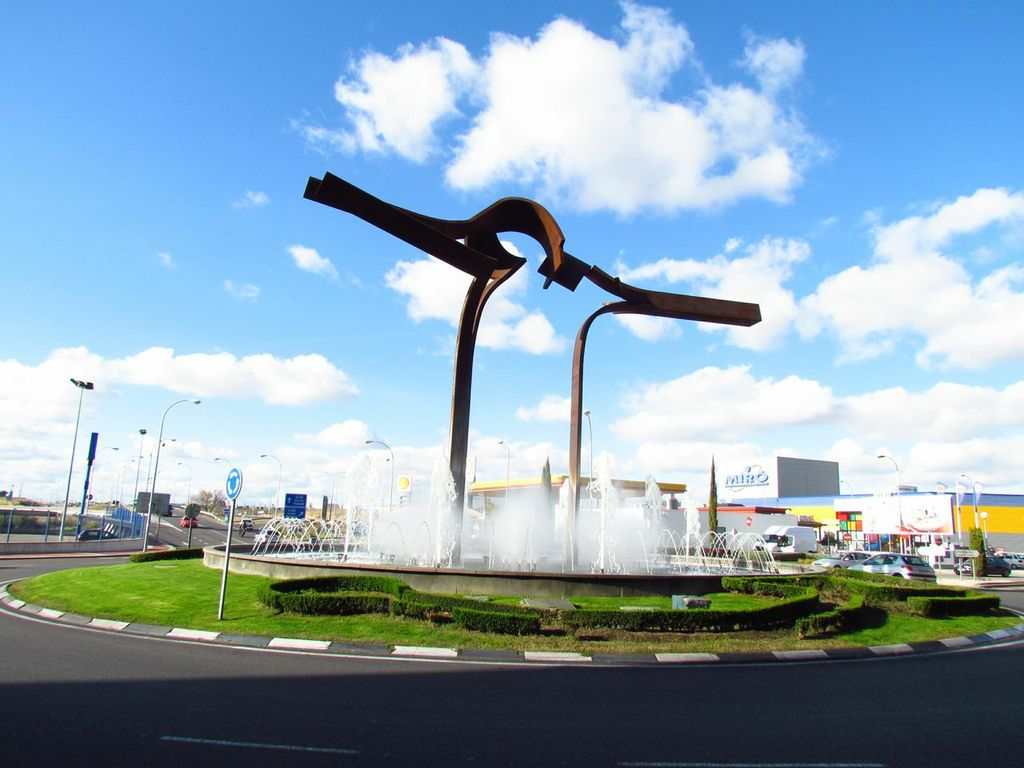
Door of Tolerance, 2005

Albert's wrought iron work is noted for the smoothness of the curves and the lightness of the forms. Cut up sections of the ship yards in Bueu Nodosa (Pontevedra), helped produced two of his monumental sculptures located in Cangas de Morrazo and Parla.

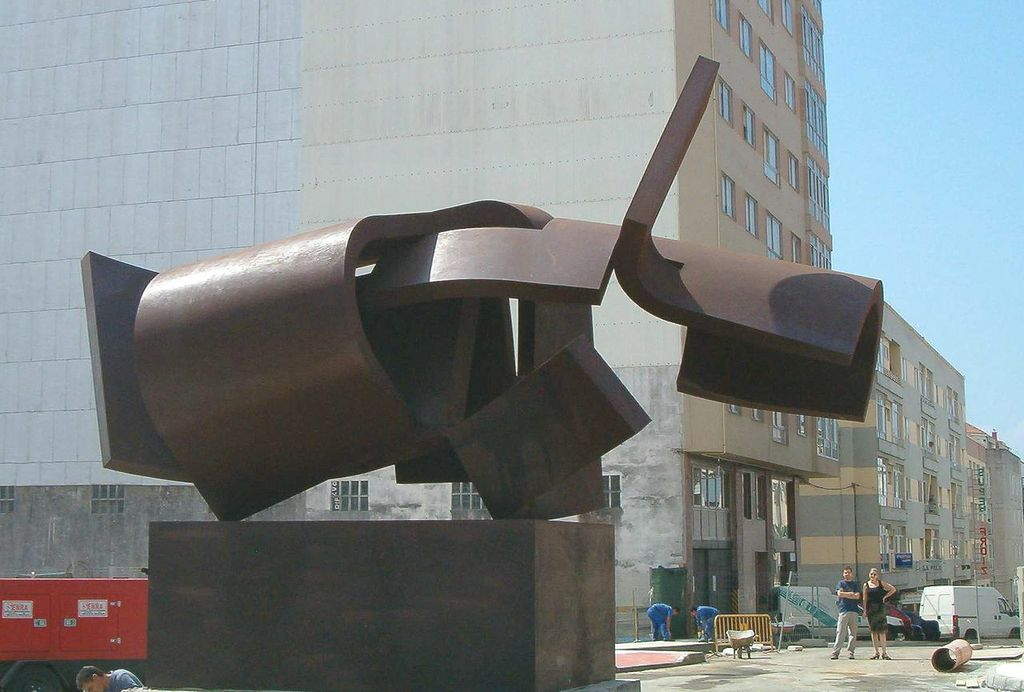
Marine 006, 2005

This work marked the beginning of a series of naval-themed pieces, under the title of Marine Architecture, presented later in several solo exhibitions. The first was shown at the Gallery Four Seventeen of Madrid in 2006 as part of a larger project called Forged Spaces I, with works produced in sheets of steel.

Albert continues to receive commissions for the creation of various memorials like the third anniversary 2007 commemoration of March 11 attack victims in Madrid in 2004, at the railway station of Santa Eugenia.

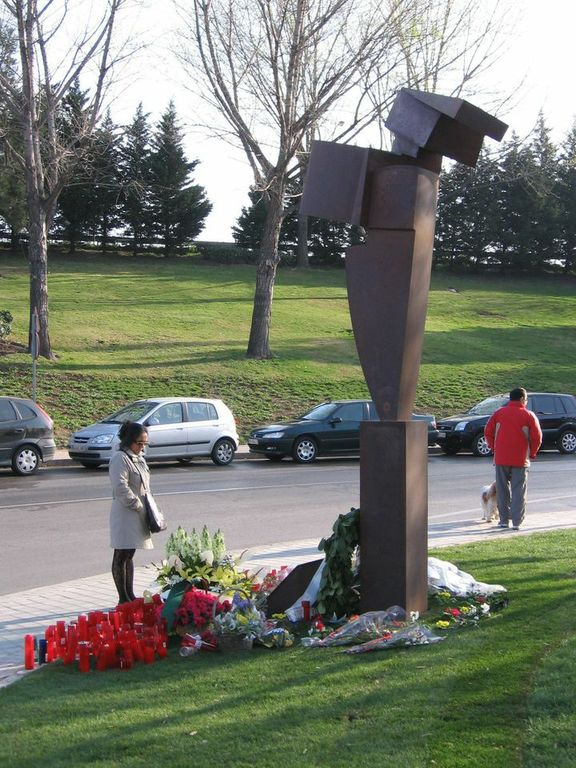
Truncated Illusion, 2007

Collaboration with the Alberto Cornejo BAT Gallery in Madrid also began in 2007 which represents the sculptor's work in the Art Fair Art Madrid. Also in this gallery, Carlos Albert, are two major individual exhibition projects like Spaces Forged II in 2010, and Spaces Forged III in 2012.

2008, Carlos was awarded first prize in the consolidated Victorio Macho Award from the City of Palencia and the Manuel Martinez Bragagnolo Sculpture Competition of the City Council of Majadahonda. He also presented the solo exhibition, Close Encounters of the Four Seventeen Gallery of Madrid.

In 2010 and 2011 he participated in several group exhibitions, such as the Youth Exchange titled Contemporary Art at the Van Dyck Art Gallery in Gijón.

His work was shown abroad in such renowned art fairs like Karlshruhe Art Fair and in German art galleries, such as 100KUBIK of Cologne. How work is represented online by Plastiké Art Gallery.

His career from 1999 until 2012 appears in a collection in a publication of 240 pages, entitled Carlos Albert, Sculptor, which includes an essay by the President of the Spanish Association of the Critics of Art, Tomás Paredes. The book illustrates the evolution of his work from the beginning, marked by clear influences of others, and finally evolving to a personal, recognizable style.

== Artistic career ==
=== Formación ===
1999-2000

- Course at the University Camberwell College of Arts (The London Institute), in London.

2001

- Bachelor's degree in fine arts (U.C.M.) Madrid.

2003

- Diploma of Advanced Studies for the PhD (DEA). Faculty of Fine Arts in Madrid. (U.C.M.).

=== Solo exhibitions ===
2025

- Museum of Contemporary Art of the Americas (MoCA-Americas) Kendall, Florida.
- “Raíces”. Arte 92. Madrid.

2024

- “El origen de los sueños”. 3 Punts Gallery. Barcelona.
- “Subtlety in space”. Ticinese Gallery. Milán.
- LOAC Alaior Art Contemporani. Indoors & outdoors exhibition. Minorca.

2023

- Carlos Albert, Galeria Ansorena, Madrid.

2020

- Raum und Farbe, Galerie 100 Kubik, Cologne.

2019

- The light of the shadows, Coconut Grove & International Plaza, Coral Gables, Miami

2018

- Carlos Albert, Tollenberg Gardens Aquilaluna Gallery Antwerp.
- El Espacio Reflejado, Galerie 100 Kubik, Cologne.
- Carlos Albert, Fundación Miguel Echauri, Pamplona.

2017

- Carlos Albert, Aquilaluna Gallery, Knokke.
- Carlos Albert, Val-Dieu Abbey, Aquilaluna Gallery, Aubel.
- Carlos Albert, Galerie 100 Kubik, Cologne.

2016

- “Kunst Zurich Fair”. Solo project; 100 Kubik Gallery. Zurich, Switzerland.
- “Forged Reality”. Bat Alberto Cornejo Gallery. Madrid.
- “Sculptures in Freedom”. Outdoors exhibition. Segovia.
- “Albert: 2012-2016”. Contemporary Art Museum Infanta Elena. Tomelloso. Spain.
- Art Angler Gallery. New York City. USA.
- “Forged thoughts”. Jordi Pascual Gallery. Barcelona. Spain.

2015

- Fermín Echauri II Gallery. Pamplona. Spain.
- “Reflects”. Outdoor Exhibition in the town of Aranda de Duero. Burgos. Spain.

2014

- “Begegnung”. 100 Kubik Gallery. Cologne. Germany.

2013

- Rafael Lozano Gallery. Madrid. Spain.
- “Zeichnen im Raum”. 100 Kubik Gallery. Cologne. Germany.
- “Paralelisms”. Teknon Centre, in collaboration with Victor Lope. Barcelona. Spain.

2012

- Fermín Echauri Gallery. Pamplona. Spain.
- Atlántica Gallery. La Coruña. Spain.
- Cartel Gallery, Fine Art. Málaga. Spain.

2011

- “Forged Spaces III”. Bat Alberto Cornejo Gallery. Madrid. Spain.

2010

- “Forged Spaces II”. Bat Alberto Cornejo Gallery. Madrid. Spain.

2008

- Atlántica Centro de Arte, La Coruña. Spain.
- “Encounters”. Cuatro Diecisiete Gallery. Madrid. Spain.

2006

- “Forged Spaces”. Cuatro Diecisiete Gallery. Madrid. Spain.

=== Group exhibitions and fairs (selection) ===
2025

- ARTMADRID Fair. BAT Alberto Cornejo Gallery. Madrid.
- Palm Beach, Modern & Contemporary Art Fair. Oliver Cole Gallery. Palm Beach. Florida

2024

- Art Miami 2024. Oliver Cole Gallery. Florida.
- Estampa. A&M Gallery. Madrid.
- Luxembourg Art Week 2024. Outdoors Exhibition (Avenue de la Liberté). Aquilaluna Gallery. Luxembourg.
- “La petite Vaux”, Aquilaluna Gallery. Nandrin.
- Coutre M.A.M. Aquilaluna Gallery. Ghent.
- Palm Beach, Modern & Contemporary Art Fair. Cortina Gallery. Palm Beach, Florida
- Art Madrid 2024. Rodrigo Juarranz Gallery. Madrid
- Karlsruhe Art Fair. Cortina Gallery. Karlsruhe

2023

- Estampa 2023. A&M Gallery. Madrid..
- “En Piste”, Museo La Boverie, Aquilaluna Gallery. Liege.
- Chauteau de Fraineux, Aquilaluna Gallery. Nandrin.
- “Proyectos / Sueños”. Odalys. Madrid.
- Karlsruhe Art Fair. Rodrigo Juarranz Gallery. Karlsruhe.
- Madrid Luxury Art (MLA), AGM Management, Madrid.

2022

- Carlos Albert, Rarity Gallery, Mykonos.
- Escultura, Galería Ansorena, Madrid.
- 30 + 7 Exposición Aniversario, Galería Aurora Vigil-Escalera, Gijón.

2021

- Celebrating diversity, 3 Punts Galeria, Barcelona.
- Farbe versus Raum, Galerie 100 Kubik, Cologne.

2020

- Carlos Albert, Aquilaluna Gallery, Dalhem.

2019

- Detrás del Muro, 13th Havana Biennial, Havana.

2017

- Art in The Forest, Flamingo Contemporary Art Museum, Vinh Phuc.
- Exposición colectiva, Cordeiros Galeria, Oporto.

2016

- Group Exhibition, Galleri MDA, Stockholm.
- Group Exhibition, Galería Fermín Echauri, Pamplona.

2015

- Salón de otoño, Fundación Sevillana Endesa, Real Alcázar, Sevilla.

2013

- Blanco y Negro, Galería Ignacio Lassaletta, Barcelona.

2012

- Jóvenes valores del arte contemporáneo, Sala de Arte Van Dyck, Gijón.

2011

- Panorama Escultórico, Galería Fernán Gómez Arte Contemporáneo, Madrid.
- Sculpture Awards, Fundación AguaGranada, Albaicín, Granada.

2010

- Sculpture Awards, Reales Atarazanas, Valencia.
- Caja Badajoz Sculpture Exhibition, Museo Luis de Morales, Badajoz.

2007

- Ciudad de Palencia Awards, Museo Fundación Díaz Caneja, Palencia.

2005

- Grupo Villa Iris, Museo Antón. Centro de Escultura, Candas.

2002

- UCM Sculpture Awards, Jardín Botánico Alfonso XII, Madrid.
- Villa de Madrid Awards, Centro Cultural Conde Duque, Madrid.

2001

- Group Exhibition, Lycée Technique des Arts et Métiers, Luxemburgo.
- Visual Arts Awards, Real Academia de Bellas Artes San Carlos, Valencia

2000

- Férreas Voluntades, Galería Raquel Ponce, Madrid.

1999

- “La Forja en Villa Iris”. Marcelino Botín Foundation. Santander.

=== Grants ===
- Hong Hac Dai Lai JSC, Flamingo Group. Vietnam. 2017
- Complutense University of Madrid. 1999-2000
- Cultural Ministry of Luxembourg. 2001
- Elsa Peretti Foundation. Girona. 2002

== Awards (selection) ==
- Sculpture award for the Group “Ciudades Patrimonio de la Humanidad” (“World Heritage Cities”), Spain, 2017.
- Gold Medal of the Autumn Exhibition of the Royal Academy of Fine Arts, Santa Isabel de Hungría delivered by La Real Maestranza de Caballería de Sevilla. 2016.
- “Sevillana Endesa Foundation” Award in the LXI National Autumn Exhibition of the “Santa Isabel de Hungría Royal Academy of Fine Arts”. Seville. 2012.
- First prize in the Sculpture Competition of “AguaGranada Foundation”. Granada, 2011.
- First Prize en el National Sculpture Competition “Ciudad de Melilla”. 2008 and 2010.
- First Prize in the XII Sculpture Competition “Manuel Martínez Bragagnolo”. Majadahonda, Madrid, 2008.
- First Sculpture Prize “Victorio Macho” of the Awards “Ciudad de Palencia”, 2008.
- Prize “Cajasol” of “XV Iberian Prize of Sculpture” “Ciudad de Punta Umbría”. Huelva, 2008.
- First Sculpture Prize “Ciudad De Atarfe”. Granada, 2007.
- First Prize of Santander Council for 2 monuments of 3 and 4 meters respectively, 2006.
- First “Sculpture International Prize” of San Fernando Henares. Madrid. 2005.
- First Prize for the design of a sculpture for the Malaga Council. 2005.
- First Prize of the International Sculpture Competition on the street “Urban Culture” of San Fernando. Cádiz, 2005.
- First Prize in the Sculpture Competition “Inves-Morrazo”, to execute a public sculpture of 6 x 6 x 3,5 m. Pontevedra, 2005.
- Prize “Fundación El Monte” of XIII Iberian Prize of Sculpture “Ciudad de Punta Umbría”. Huelva, 2005.
- First Sculpture Prize of the “XVI Fine Arts Competition, Miguel González Sandoval”. Excmo. Ayuntamiento de Lora del Río. Seville. 2003.
- First Sculpture Prize of the “IV National Competition Fernando Quiñones”. Excmo. Ayuntamiento de Cádiz. 2003.
- First Prize of the “XXII Sculpture Competition Villa de Parla”. 2002.
- First Sculpture Prize of the “VIII National Prize of the University of Seville”, 2002.
- First Prize of the “Fine Arts Competition of the Faculty of Fine Arts of Madrid”, 2001.

== Public works museums and collections (selection) ==
- Real Maestranza de Caballería. Seville.
- Sevillana Endesa Foundation. Seville.
- Venancio Blanco Foundation. Madrid.
- AguaGranada Foundation. Granada.
- Caixanova Collection. A Coruña.
- Complutense University of Madrid.
- University of Seville.
- FRIDE Foundation.
- Contemporary Art Museum in Ayllon. Segovia.
- City of Salamanca.
- City of Palencia.
- City of Aranda de Duero. Burgos.
- City of Majadahonda. Madrid.
- City of Melilla.
- City of Madrid.
- City of Parla. Madrid.
- City of Santander.
- City of San Fernando. Cádiz.
- City of Móstoles. Madrid.
- City of Cangas de Morrazo, Pontevedra.
- City of Camarma de Esteruelas. Madrid.
- City of Soria.
- City of Atarfe. Granada.
- City of San Fernando de Henares. Madrid.
- City of Málaga.
- City of Lora del Río. Seville.
- City of Punta Umbría. Huelva.

== Bibliography ==
- Albert Andrés, Carlos (2012). Carlos Albert, sculptor. Editorial Godoy. Madrid. ISBN 978-84-85995-39-4
