= Jane Feather =

British–American writer

- Born: 1945 (age 80–81); Cairo, Egypt
- Citizenship: American
- Occupation: Novelist
- Writing career
- Pen name: Claudia Bishop
- Period: 1981–present
- Genres: Contemporary and historical Romances

Jane Feather (born Jane Robotham 1945 in Cairo, Egypt) is a popular British–American writer of historical romance novels. In 1984 she wrote five contemporary romances under the pseudonym Claudia Bishop. She is a The New York Times-bestselling, award-winning writer, and has more than ten million romance novels in print.

== Biography ==
Jane Robotham was born on 1945 in Cairo, (Egypt), and grew up in the New Forest, in the south of England. She has a master's degree in applied social studies from Oxford University. She is married and has three children.

In 1978 she moved with her husband and children to New Jersey, where she worked as a psychiatric social worker.

In 1981 she began her writing career after she and her family moved to Washington D.C. Since printing in 1984 she wrote five contemporary romance novels under the pen name Claudia Bishop and since 1986 has written historical romances under her name, Jane Feather.
