= Clinch cover =

Style of cover art for romance books

The clinch cover is the name for a style of romance book cover art. It generally features two people touching or in close proximity, and the art style has its roots in pulp art.

== Origin and development ==
The 1949 creation of Harlequin Enterprises is partially credited with the rise of the clinch cover in the 1970s for directly marketing to women through the use of the cover and for placing the books in areas they specifically saw women interacting with. The rise of the modern romance genre itself is attributed to Avon through the publication of the mass-produced and initially paperback 1972 bodice ripper The Flame and the Flower.

The clinch cover style became popular through the 1970s and 1980s, and originally usually was done by taking a photograph and then painting a scene, but in the modern day it is sometimes done with just photography.

The posing, state of dress, and appearance of the people on the clinch cover is informed by the politics of the era, such as the women's liberation movement. Though the clinch cover usually features a white, heterosexual couple, the style has been used for other book pairings as well. Author Ann Allen Shockley utilized a clinch cover for her 1974 interracial lesbian romance novel Loving Her, and author Beverly Jenkins frequently uses clinch covers for her black romance novels.

Since the 1990s, romance book covers have shifted slowly away from clinch covers, with less focus on or a lack of people on the cover (such as the trend towards landscapes observed in 2001), to cartoon covers in the 21st century.

== Prominent clinch cover artists ==
- Pino Daeni, who illustrated the covers of over 3000 books
- Elaine Duillo, credited with the addition of men to the clinch cover with her cover art for Laura Black's 1978 novel Glendraco. Also credited with the rise of Fabio due to her use of him as a model for her clinch cover art for Hearts Aflame (1987).
- John Ennis
- Charles Geer
- Roger Kastel
- Robert McGinnis, who made the first clinch cover with a fully naked man for Fires of Winter (1980).
