= Clench =

Clench may refer to:

== People ==
- Clench (surname)

== Places in England ==
- Clench, Wiltshire, in the parish of Milton Lilbourne
  - Clench Mill, a windmill in Wiltshire
- Clench Common, a hamlet in the parish of Savernake, Wiltshire

== In fiction ==
- Clench (Transformers), a fictional character in the various Transformers universes

== See also ==
- Clinch (disambiguation)
- Clunch
