= Clinch =

Clinch may refer to:

- Nail (fastener) or device to hold in this way
- Clinch cover, a style of romance book cover art
- Clinching, in metalworking
- Clinch fighting or the clinch, a grappling position in boxing or wrestling, a stand-up embrace
- Clinch County, Georgia, USA
- Clinch River, near Tazewell, Virginia, USA
- Clinch & Co Brewery, an English brewery founded in 1811
- Clinch & Co Brewery (Isle of Man)

== People ==
- Danny Clinch (born 1964), American photographer and film director
- Duncan Lamont Clinch (1787–1849), American army officer
- Gavin Clinch (born 1974), rugby league footballer
- John Clinch (cricketer) (born 1967), English cricketer
- Mackenzie Clinch Hoycard (born 1998), Australian basketball player
