= Clincher =

Clincher may refer to:

- Clincher tire, a type of bicycle tire
- Clincher (EP), a 1993 EP by Tar
- "The Clincher", a 2005 single by Chevelle
- Clincher (band), an Australian band

== See also ==
- Clinch (disambiguation)
