= The Flame and the Flower =

Book by Kathleen E. Woodiwiss, published 1972

- Front cover by Avon Book
- Author: Kathleen E. Woodiwiss
- Language: English
- Genre: Historical romance
- Published: April 1972, Avon
- Publication place: United States
- Media type: Print (Hardback & paperback)
- Followed by: The Kiss (short story)

The Flame and the Flower (published 1972) is the debut work of romance novelist Kathleen E. Woodiwiss. The first modern "bodice ripper" romance novel, the book revolutionized the historical romance genre. It was also the first full-length romance novel to be published first in paperback rather than hardback.

== Background ==
=== Author ===
As a child, Kathleen E. Woodiwiss relished creating her own stories, and by age six was telling herself stories at night to help fall asleep. After she married, Woodiwiss continued to think of plots. Several times she attempted to write a novel, but each time stopped in frustration at the slow pace of writing a novel longhand. After buying her husband an electric typewriter for a Christmas present, Woodiwiss appropriated the machine to begin her novel in earnest.

=== Society ===
In the late 1960s and early 1970s, as the feminist movement gained visibility in the United States, female sexuality became more open. The United States Supreme Court effectively gutted the nation's obscenity laws in 1966, ruling in Memoirs v. Massachusetts that the state could not ban the reprint of John Cleland's erotic novel Fanny Hill. Attitudes toward premarital sex also relaxed considerably. In 1972, less than 40% of American women fully or conditionally endorsed premarital sex; by 1982, 58% of women had adopted this attitude.

=== Publication ===
In the late 1960s and early 1970s, there were two routes to publication for romance novels. Short novels which followed a conventional plot pattern and were set in contemporary times were known as category romances. These were distributed to drugstores and other mass-market outlets and were generally available for only one month before being pulled from the shelves. Longer novels, set in either contemporary or historical times, were published in hardback.

Woodiwiss's finished work, The Flame and the Flower, was substantially longer than contemporary works at over 600 pages. It was rejected by multiple agents and hardcover publishers for its length. Rather than follow the advice of the rejection letters and rewrite or edit the novel to a shorter length, Woodiwiss instead submitted it to paperback publisher Avon Books. Avon editor Nancy Coffey pulled the manuscript from the slush pile and liked what she read. Avon purchased the publication rights from Woodiwiss for $1,500 and agreed to pay her 4% of the royalties.

== Plot summary ==
The novel is set at the turn of the 19th century. After Heather Simmons, a penniless orphan, kills a man named William Court who was attempting to rape her, she flees the scene. Near the London dockside, two men, who mistake her for a prostitute, seize her and escort her onto a ship. Heather believes she has been arrested for murder. Unaware of the misconceptions on both sides, the captain of the ship, Brandon Birmingham, rapes Heather. When he does so, he ruptures her hymen and realizes she was a virgin and, therefore, probably not a prostitute. Heather cries herself to sleep and a confused Brandon sleeps next to her.

The next morning Heather wakes up and Brandon, awakened by her movement, rapes her a second time. Afterwards, when Brandon asks her why she would sell her virginity on the streets, she tearfully tells him that she was merely lost. Afraid that Heather will tell others what he has done, Brandon tries to bribe Heather by offering to set her up in an affluent house as his mistress. She angrily declines. An angry Brandon then takes Heather hostage and rapes her a third time.

Afterwards Heather goes back to sleep. When she awakens again she is allowed to bathe and has breakfast with Brandon. Brandon then attempts to rape her a fourth time but is interrupted when his crewman calls him away on business. When Brandon leaves the ship, Heather manages to escape his ship and flees back home.

The rapes left Heather pregnant, and she reveals what happened to her aunt and uncle. Brandon is tracked down and a magistrate forces him and Heather to marry. Neither is pleased with their new situation. Over the next few months, as they prepare for and undertake a voyage to Brandon's home in Charleston, South Carolina, their feelings for each other begin to soften.

Once in the United States, Heather is plagued by Louisa Wells, Brandon's jealous former betrothed, who attempts to drive a wedge between the couple. Other jealous girls, including Sybil Scott, also try to cause problems between Heather and Brandon. Heather and Brandon continue to misunderstand each other's motives, leading to much tension between them. Heather eventually gives birth to a healthy son, Beau. Several months later, Heather and Brandon resolve their differences, profess their love to each other, and share a bed for the first time as husband and wife. The following morning, Sybil Scott is found murdered. Although Brandon is accused of the crime, Heather is able to provide him an alibi.

Soon after, Heather is blackmailed by Thomas Hint, the former assistant to William Court. Thomas also left England and came to Charleston where he opened a dress shop. He threatens to tell the authorities that Heather murdered William. One of Brandon's sailors named Dickie also informs Louisa that Brandon had discovered Heather on the streets. Louisa believes that Heather was a prostitute, and confronts Brandon. She promises to forgive him for his dalliance if he will send Heather back to London and allow her to take Heather's place as wife and mother of Beau. Brandon threatens Louisa and sends her away. When she is found dead the following morning, Brandon is arrested.

Heather confronts Thomas, who confesses to killing both women, and also William Court, and then tries to rape her. She is saved by Brandon, who had been released from jail. During the ensuing confrontation, Brandon is shot in the arm. Thomas escapes, but the skittish horse he chose bucks him to the ground. A tree limb collapsed on him, killing him instantly. The charges against Brandon are dropped, and he and Heather live happily ever after.

== Genre ==
At the time of this novel's publication, romance novels, especially those distributed in mass-market format, were generally very chaste, with minimal physical intimacy between the protagonists. Heroines remained virgins—or chaste widows—throughout the novel. The Flame and the Flower departed from this notion quite early in the book. (Note: The initial sex scene took place on page 28. (Frum (2000), p. 193.)) The sexual encounters were not only graphic, but also sometimes violent and non-consensual. The heroine was not only raped by her future husband, but two other men attempted to rape her. The initial rape was used as a plot device to overcome the societal norms which frowned on women who consented to premarital sex. Instead of being described as a completely violent act, the rape was depicted as an "erotic fantasy" of subjugation.

In many romances, heroines generally did not have strong personalities, and were more submissive to the heroes. Heroines of gothic romances often displayed more spunk, but were still dependent on a wealthy, handsome hero. Woodiwiss developed her female protagonist, Heather, more along the lines of a gothic heroine, as slightly more independent but still occasionally needing a stronger man to rescue her. However, rather than being completely dependent on her hero, Heather acted in a manner that earned his respect along with his love.

Woodiwiss's hero, Brandon, was initially depicted as ominous and dangerous, "darkly tanned" with black hair and a willingness to imprison the heroine to get his way. As the book progressed, the hero was instead subjugated by his love for the heroine. In the novel's climax he was described as "pale" and "trembling", the antithesis of his initial description. In her book The Dangerous Lover, Deborah Lutz labels this reversal a "grandness of contradiction distinct from other romance formulas, particularly earlier ones".

In another departure from romances of the time, The Flame and the Flower took the reader on journey to multiple locales, some exotic for their time. The travel was routine for the hero, but allowed the heroine to have a grand adventure.

== Publication ==
Like most paperback publishers, Avon chose one book each month to receive extensive advertising and a larger than normal print run. In 1970, Avon had broken with tradition by selecting Burt Hirschfield's Fire Island, which had not previously been published in hardback, as a featured title. After reading The Flame and the Flower, Coffey believed that it, like Fire Island, could be a successful original feature. With its April 1972 publication as an "Avon Spectacular" book, the novel became the first single-title romance novel to be published as an original paperback. (Note: Category romances were always published originally in paperback; romances that did not fit into a category line debuted in hardcover.) Like category romances, it was distributed in drug stores and other mass-market merchandising outlets. Paperback books generally were not reviewed by critics. The novel's more erotic content probably contributed to it being a better candidate for initial paperback release rather than hardcover.

The book was scheduled for an initial print run of 500,000 copies. By 1978, it had been through 40 printings and had sold over 4.5 million copies. It is still in print as of 2020.

The cover, designed by Avon Art Director Barbara Bertoli, set a standard for sensual historical romance covers. The clinch cover was an example of what was called "the Avon look" with a large solid color background, large type, and a small vignette. One early version of the cover included a vignette by veteran illustrator Robert McGinnis. To reflect the more sensual content of the novel, the cover depicted a couple in a full-embrace rather than subtly hinting at physical contact.

== Influence ==
Avon followed its release of The Flame and the Flower with the 1974 publication of Woodiwiss's second novel, The Wolf and the Dove and two similarly themed romance novels by newcomer Rosemary Rogers. In 1975, Publishers Weekly reported that these four "Avon originals" had sold a combined 8 million copies. Avon's "extraordinary success" led other paperback publishing firms to begin featuring original works by new authors. Avon became known as the premier publishing company for new writers of romance novels.

Between 1972 and 1974, the popularity of gothic romances began to wane. The roots of this decline may lie in the sexual revolution and the feminist movement and are likely entwined with the success of The Flame and the Flower. Women were more accepting of, and possibly actively looking for, increased sensuality in novels. This novel–along with Woodiwiss's second and the two Rogers books–essentially established a new style of romance writing, the erotic historical romance. In 1976, over 150 historical romance novels, many of them paperback originals, were published, selling over 40 million copies. These novels were historical fiction tracking the monogamous relationship between helpless heroines and the hero who rescued her, even if he had been the one to place her in danger. This new type of novel, also occasionally referred to as an epic romance, featured longer plots and more intimate and steamy sex scenes. Female characters often travelled to exotic locations and historical incidents or issues were often used as plot points. The Flame and the Flower directly inspired LaVyrle Spencer and Jude Deveraux to begin their own careers as historical romance novelists. According to Deveraux, she began work on her first book, The Enchanted Land, the day after she finished reading The Flame and the Flower

The novel has also been compared to Lace by British writer Shirley Conran, due to its discussions of women's sexuality.

== Sequels ==
- "The Kiss", an anthology from Three Weddings and a Kiss, 1995
- "Beyond the Kiss", an anthology from Married at Midnight, 1996
- A Season Beyond a Kiss, 2000
- The Elusive Flame, 1998

== Sources ==
- Frum, David (2000), How We Got Here: The '70s, the Decade That Brought You Modern Life - For Better or Worse, Basic Books, ISBN 0-465-04196-5
- Lutz, Deborah (2006), The Dangerous Lover: Gothic Villains, Byronism, and the Nineteenth-Century Seduction Narrative (PDF), The Ohio State University, ISBN 0-8142-1034-1
- McKnight-Trontz, Jennifer (2002), The Look of Love: The Art of the Romance Novel, Princeton Architectural Press, ISBN 1-56898-312-3
- Mulhern, Chieko Irie (February 1989), "Japanese Harlequin Romances as Transcultural Woman's Fiction", The Journal of Asian Studies, vol. 48, no. 1
- Radway, Janice A. (1999), "The Institutional Matrix of Romance", in During, Simon (ed.), The Cultural Studies Reader, Routledge, ISBN 978-0-415-13753-9
- Radway, Janice (2001), "Readers and Their Romances", in Machor, James L.; Goldstein, Philip (eds.), Reception Study: From Literary Theory to Cultural Studies, New York, NY: Routledge, ISBN 0-415-92649-1
- Silverman, Al (2008), The Time of Their Lives: The Golden Age of Great American Book Publishers, Their Editors and Authors, St. Martin's Press, ISBN 978-0-312-35003-1
- Thurston, Carol (1987), The Romance Revolution: Erotic Novels for Women and the Quest for a New Sexual Identity, Urbana and Chicago: University of Illinois Press, ISBN 0-252-01442-1
