= Historical romance =

Literary genre centred on romantic relationships in historical settings

Kathleen Woodiwiss's The Flame and the Flower

Historical romance is a broad category of mass-market fiction focusing on romantic relationships in historical periods, which Byron helped popularize in the early 19th century. The genre often takes the form of the novel.

== Varieties ==
=== Viking ===
Viking books feature warriors during the Dark Ages or Middle Ages. Heroes in Viking romances are stereotypically masculine men who are later "tamed" by their heroines. Most heroes are described as "tall, blonde, and strikingly handsome." Using the Viking culture allows novels set in these time periods to include some travel, as the Vikings were "adventurers, founding and conquering colonies all over the globe." In a 1997 poll of over 200 readers of Viking romances, Johanna Lindsey's Fires of Winter was considered the best of the subgenre. The subgenre has fallen out of style, and few novels in this vein have been published since the mid-1990s.

=== Medieval ===
Medieval romances are typically set between 938 and 1485. Women in the medieval time periods were often considered as no more than property who were forced to live at the mercy of their father, guardian, or the king. Always a lady, the heroine must use her wits and will and find a husband who will accept her need to be independent, yet still protect her from the dangers of the times. The hero is almost always a knight who first learns to respect her and her uncommon ideas and then falls in love. Heroes are always strong and dominant, and the heroine, despite the gains she has made, is usually still in a subordinate position. However, that position is her choice, made "for the sake of and with protection from an adoring lover, whose main purpose in life is to fulfill his beloved's wishes."

=== Tudor ===
Tudor romances are set in England between 1485 and 1558.

=== Elizabethan ===
Elizabethan romances are set in England between 1558 and 1603, during the time of Elizabeth I.

=== Stuart ===
Stuart romances are set between 1603 and 1714 in England.

=== Georgian ===
Georgian romances are set between 1714 and 1811 in England.

=== Regency ===
Regency romances are set between 1811 and 1820 in England during the Regency era.

=== Victorian ===
Victorian romances are set in England between 1832 and 1901, beginning with the Reform Act 1832 and including the reign of Queen Victoria. Novels set during this period but in a fictional country may be Ruritanian novels such as those by Beatrice Heron-Maxwell. M.M. Kaye focuses on the British Raj in this period rather than England itself.

=== Pirate ===
Pirate novels feature a male or female who is sailing, or thought to be sailing, as a pirate or privateer on the high seas. According to Ryan Kate, heroes are the "ultimate bad boys," who "dominate all for the sake of wealth and freedom." The heroine is usually captured by the hero in an early part of the novel, and then is forced to succumb to his wishes; eventually she falls in love with her captor. On the rarer occasions where the heroine is the pirate, the book often focuses on her struggle to maintain her freedom of choice while living the life of a man. Regardless of the sex of the pirate, much of the action in the book takes place at sea.

=== Colonial United States ===
Colonial United States novels are all set in that country between 1630 and 1798.

=== Civil War ===
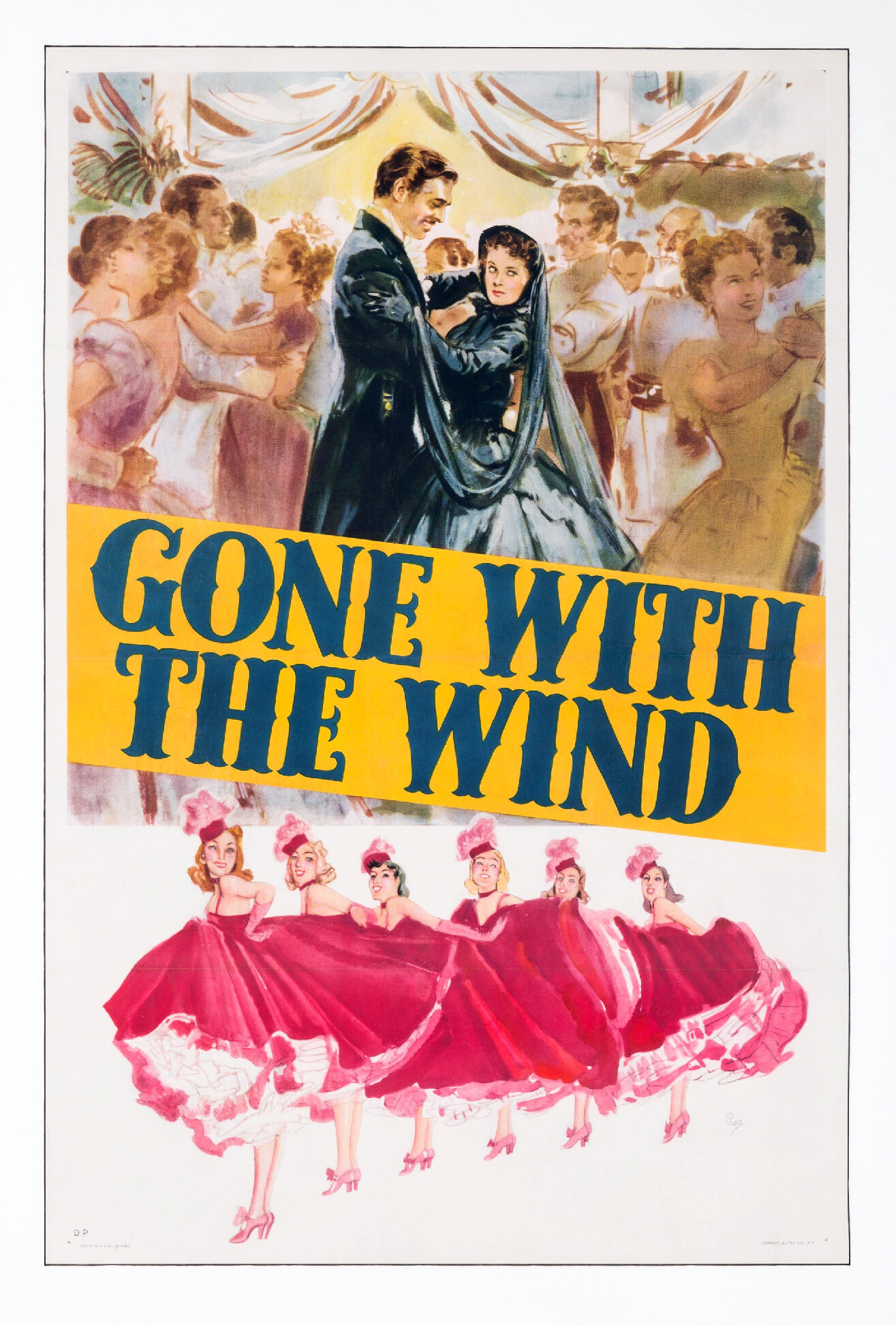
A poster for the film Gone with the Wind

Civil War novels place their characters within the events of the American Civil War and the Reconstruction era. They may be set in the Confederacy or the Union.

=== Western ===
Western novels are set in the frontier of the United States, Canada, or Australia. Unlike Westerns, where women are often marginalized, the Western romance focuses on the experiences of the female. Heroes in these novels seek adventure and are forced to conquer the unknown. They are often loners, slightly uncivilized, and "earthy." Their heroines are often forced to travel to the frontier by events outside their control. These women must learn to survive in a man's world, and, by the end of the novel, have conquered their fears with love. In many cases the couple must face a level of personal danger, and, upon surmounting their troubles, are able to forge a strong relationship for the future.

=== Native American ===
Native American novels could also fall into the Western subgenre, but always feature Native American protagonists, historically described as "Red Indians", whose "heritage is integral to the story." These romances "[emphasize] instinct, creativity, freedom, and the longing to escape from the strictures of society to return to nature." Members of Native American tribes who appear in the books are usually depicted as "exotic figures" who "[possess] a freedom to be admired and envied." Often the Native protagonist is struggling against racial prejudice and incurs hardships trying to maintain a way of life that is different from the norm. By the end of the novel, however, the problems are surmounted. The heroes of these novels are often fighting to control their darker desires. In many cases, the hero or heroine is captured and then falls in love with a member of the tribe. The tribe is always depicted as civilized, not consisting of savages, and misunderstood.

When surveyed about their reasons for reading Native American romances, many readers cite the desire to learn about the beliefs, customs and culture of the Native American tribes. The novels within this subgenre are generally not limited to a specific tribe, location, or time period. Readers appreciate that native tribes "have a whole different way of life, a different way of thinking and a different way of looking at things". In many cases, the tribe's love of nature is highlighted.

=== Americana ===
Americana novels are set in the United States between 1880 and 1920, usually in a small town or in the Midwest.

== History ==
=== In England ===
One of the first popular historical romances appeared in 1921, when Georgette Heyer published The Black Moth, which is set in 1751. It was not until 1935 that she wrote the first of her signature Regency novels, set around the English Regency period (1811–1820), when the Prince Regent ruled England in place of his ill father, George III. Heyer's Regency novels were inspired by Jane Austen's novels of the late 18th and early 19th century. Because Heyer's writing was set in the midst of events that had occurred over 100 years previously, she included authentic period detail in order for her readers to understand. Where Heyer referred to historical events, it was as background detail to set the period, and did not usually play a key role in the narrative. Heyer's characters often contained more modern-day sensibilities, and more conventional characters in the novels would point out the heroine's eccentricities, such as wanting to marry for love.

=== In the United States ===
The modern romance genre was born in America 1972 with Avon's publication of Kathleen Woodiwiss's The Flame and the Flower, the first romance novel "to [follow] the principals into the bedroom." Aside from its content, the book was revolutionary in that it was one of the first single-title romance novels to be published as an original paperback, rather than being first published in hardcover, and, like the category romances, was distributed in drug stores and other mass-market merchandising outlets. The novel went on to sell 2.35 million copies. Avon followed its release with the 1974 publication of Woodiwiss's second novel, The Wolf and the Dove and two novels by newcomer Rosemary Rogers. One of Rogers's novels, Dark Fires sold two million copies in its first three months of release, and, by 1975, Publishers Weekly had reported that the "Avon originals" had sold a combined 8 million copies. The following year over 150 historical romance novels, many of them paperback originals, were published, selling over 40 million copies. Unlike Woodiwiss, Rogers's novels featured couples who travelled the world, usually were separated for a time, and had multiple partners within the book.

The success of these novels prompted a new style of writing romance, concentrating primarily on historical fiction tracking the monogamous relationship between a helpless heroines and the hero who rescued her, even if he had been the one to place her in danger. The covers of these novels tended to feature scantily clad women being grabbed by the hero, and caused the novels to be referred to as "bodice-rippers." A Wall St. Journal article in 1980 referred to these bodice rippers as "publishing's answer to the Big Mac: They are juicy, cheap, predictable, and devoured in stupifying quantities by legions of loyal fans." The term bodice-ripper is now considered offensive to many in the romance industry.

In this new style of historical romance, heroines were independent and strong-willed and were often paired with heroes who evolved into caring and compassionate men who truly admired the women they loved. This was in contrast to the contemporary romances published during this time, which were often characterized by weak females who fell in love with overbearing alpha males. Although these heroines had active roles in the plot, they were "passive in relationships with the heroes", Across the genre, heroines during this time were usually aged 16–21, with the heroes slightly older, usually around 30. The women were virgins, while the men were not, and both members of the couple were described as beautiful.

In the late 1980s, historical romance dominated the romance genre. The most popular of the historical romances were those that featured warriors, knights, pirates, and cowboys. In the 1990s the genre began to focus more on humor, as Julie Garwood began introducing humorous elements and characters into her historical romances.

== Market ==
Historical romance novels are rarely published in hardcover, with fewer than 15 receiving that status each year. The contemporary market usually sees 4 to 5 times that many hardcovers. Because historical romances are primarily published in mass-market format, their fortunes are tied to a certain extent to the mass-market trends. Booksellers and large merchandisers are selling fewer mass market paperbacks, preferring trade paperbacks or hardcovers, which prevent historical romances from being sold in some price clubs and other mass merchandise outlets.

In 2001, historical romance reached a 10-year high as 778 were published. By 2004, that number had dropped to 486, which was still 20% of all romance novels published. Kensington Books claims that they are receiving fewer submissions of historical novels, and that their previously published authors are switiching to contemporary.
