= Lace (novel) =

1982 romance novel by Shirley Conran

- Cover of first edition (1982)
- Author: Shirley Conran
- Language: English
- Genre: Romance
- Publication date: 1982
- Followed by: Lace 2

Lace is a 1982 novel by British writer Shirley Conran. The novel revolves around the lives of four women: Judy, Maxine, Kate and Pagan. The group become friends when they meet in Switzerland, where Judy is working as a waitress and the other three are at finishing school. Much of the novel is told through a series of flashbacks, where the four women recount their early sexual relationships and experiences. Upon publication, the novel was heavily promoted, with lace garters amongst the merchandise given away. Reviewers noted that the novel was likely to sell extremely well, but others disapproved of its approaches to women's rights. In its most infamous sex scene, a man uses a goldfish as a sex aid by inserting it into a woman's vagina and then sucking it out with his mouth.

The novel sold over 3 million copies in 35 countries. It is widely regarded as one of four texts foundational to the bonkbuster genre; the others are Riders by Jilly Cooper, Scruples by Judith Krantz and Hollywood Wives by Jackie Collins. The novel was adapted as a miniseries for American television in 1984. The work was republished in 2012 to celebrate its 30th anniversary. Upon publication the novel was compared to Little Women by Louisa May Alcott; later analysis has compared it to The Flame and the Flower by Kathleen E. Woodiwiss.

== Plot ==
Lace is a novel that revolves around the lives of four women: Judy, Maxine, Kate and Pagan. The group become friends when they meet in Switzerland, where Judy is working as a waitress and the other three are at are finishing school. Much of the novel is told through a series of flashbacks, where the four women recount their early sexual relationships and experiences. Not all of these are positive: the novel includes examples of rape, abuse, abortion and domestic violence, as well as candid discussion of sex. Through the accounts of their lives, the reader learns about Judy's career in advertising, Maxine's work as an interior designer, Kate's work as a writer and war correspondent, and Pagan's alcoholism and ultimate charity work.

The novel opens with a meeting of the group of women, convened by a starlet called Lili. She wants to know which one of the four is her mother, so she can better understand her background and herself. Lili's birth mother is revealed as Judy at the end of the novel. However Judy conceals who Lili's birth father is: she states it was a fellow waiter, Nick, who was killed in Malaya, when in fact it was Pagan's former boyfriend, Prince Abdullah, who had raped Judy as a teenager in Switzerland. Judy concealed the truth from Lili since Abdullah and Lili had a well-publicised love affair, and Judy feared knowledge of their incest would be damaging to her daughter, Lili.

== Background ==
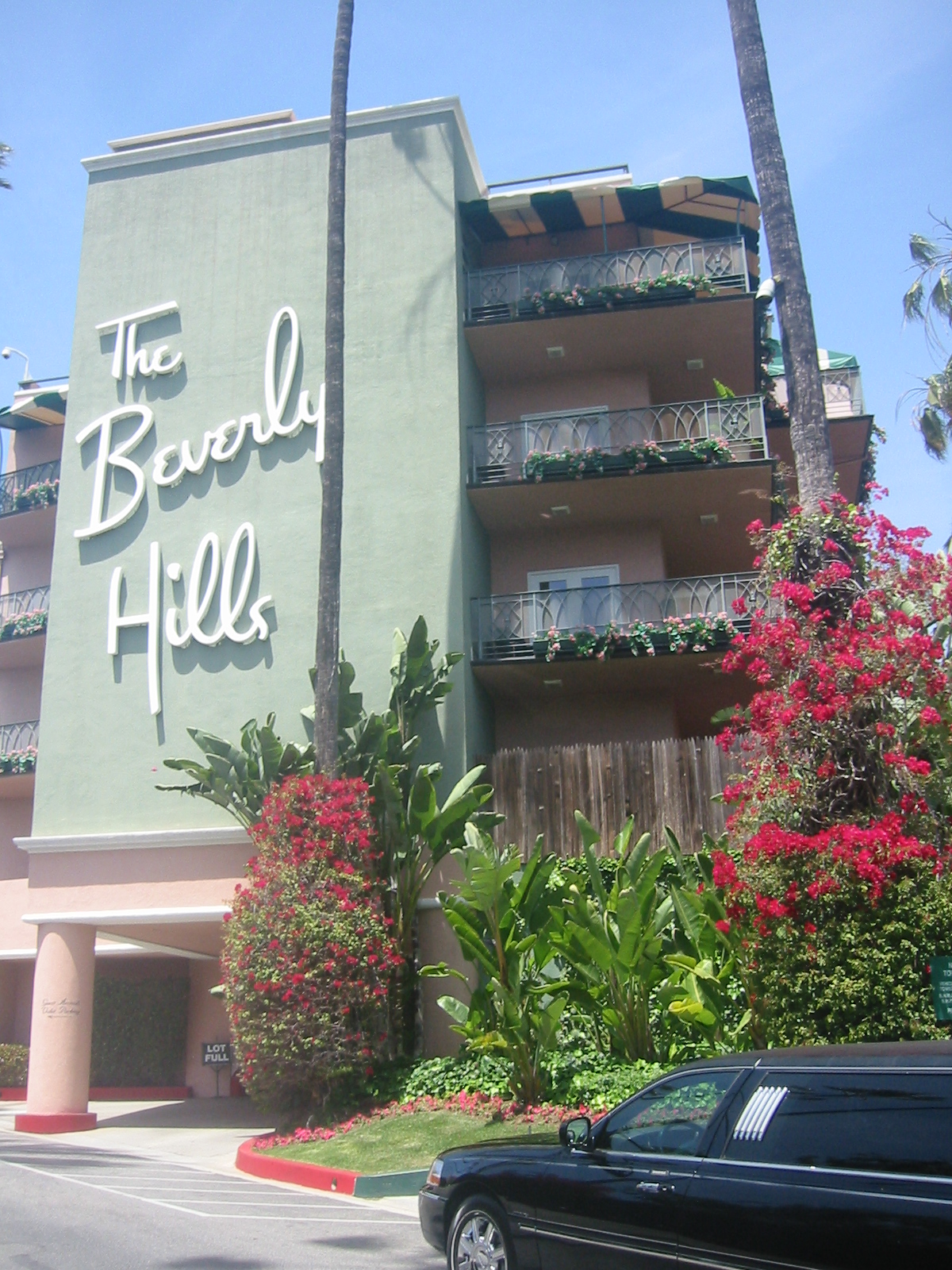
Location where Conran began work on the novel

Prior to her work on Lace, Conran had been researching a sex education book aimed at school children. Conran was quoted in an article in The Guardian as describing the book as "really intensely researched sexual information dressed up as a novel". She started the outline in 1979 whilst staying in The Beverley Hills Hotel. To write the first draft of the novel, Conran woke up at 5am and worked from 6am to 6pm for one year. Some characters in the book are based on people from Conran's life including a former boyfriend Henri Roussel. According to her obituary in The New York Times, Conran sold the rights to the novel to Simon and Schuster for £1,000,000; this was then followed by intensive rewriting as the request of editor Michael Korda. The sales were split between £250,000 for the British publication rights, and £750,000 for American.

== Reception ==
Upon its release in 1982 Lace was heavily promoted by the publishers, including giveaways of lace garters embroidered in gold with the title. It went to number one in the bestseller lists in the USA and to number two in the United Kingdom. One early opinion from an American book executive was that the book was "trashy" but would sell well. The Guardian reviewed the novel as "a splendid long wallow in all that money can buy". Soon after publication, the producers of Dallas purchased the rights to Lace for $1,000,000. During the publication tour for the first edition, given to the Liverpool Echo, described the novel as showing "all human life" across the novel's pages. The interview noted that there had been much debate as to which of the characters was based on Conran; the answer was Aunt Hortense, Maxine's problem-saving aunt. Some early readers compared the novel to Little Women by Louisa May Alcott - a parallel that Conran found pleasing.

However not all reviews were positive: Trudy Krisher writing in The Journal Herald described the novel as being "... as dangerous to a woman's self image as a cigarette is to her lungs. They promote the notion that women care only about renovating their houses or excavating their faces". The same review also concentrated on the themes of fashion and class in the novel. Another review commented that Conran had defended the sex in her novel, arguing that it was not "a sex manual [with] added characters", but that every sex scene moves forward either plot or characterisation.

The paperback version was published in 1983. The Irish Independent described the second intense publicity tour that Conran undertook to promote the novel.

== Legacy ==
The novel sold over 3 million copies in 35 countries. It is widely regarded as one of four texts foundational to the bonkbuster genre; the others are Riders by Jilly Cooper, Scruples by Judith Krantz and Hollywood Wives by Jackie Collins. According to academics Amy Burge and Jodi McAlistair, of the four novels, Lace contains the most infamous sex scene, where Prince Abdullah uses a goldfish as a sex aid by inserting into a woman's vagina and then sucking it out. In the novel the woman experiences sexual pleasure as a result. However, according to Richard Cohen's book How To Write Like Tolstoy, this and other sex scenes in the novel were not originally written by Conran, and Conran paid £500 to another author, Celia Brayfield, for "12 erotic scenes". Conversely, in Conran's obituary in The New York Times, her son Sebastian described how her first husband Terence Conran had been told about the practice in Scandinavia. Conran herself described the practice as "a sort of kindergarten Japanese perversion" in one 1982 interview on the release of the book, and "a traditional Japanese lovemaking technique" in another.

The work was republished in 2012 to celebrate its 30th anniversary. Described at the time by the journalist Sarah Hughes as a "feminist tract disguised as a bonkbuster", she praised its depiction of women's friendships. Hughes also argued that, despite the novel being most memorable for its graphic sex scenes, "in reality the book is filled with pages of argument about a woman's right to work, the need for equal pay and the juggling of children and career". In October 2018 the magazine Red nominated Lace as its "Sexy book of the month".

This was echoed by Rachel Cooke, writing in 2024, who similarly appreciated the strength of the women in the novel. Cooke described how for many of her peers, Lace would be cited as an inspiration in the same breath as Jane Eyre, drawing comparison with Charlotte Brontë as a result. it has also been compared to A Woman of Substance by Barbara Taylor Bradford. This feminist sentiment was also shared by Zimbabwean novelist Irene Sabatini, who also commented on how the book was passed around her boarding school and reminisced on "what giggles it provoked; how many hushed discussions it spawned". Its role in sex education for a generation has been written about elsewhere.

The novel was followed by a sequel, Lace 2.

== Adaptations ==
The novel was adapted as a miniseries for American television in 1984. The series starred Bess Armstrong, Brooke Adams and Arielle Dombasle. The series was so successful it was deemed a template for other adaptations of similar works to follow, one example being Hollywood Wives.

It was adapted into the Hindi film, Dil Aashna Hai (1992) directed by Hema Malini.

== Analysis ==
Lisbeth Larsson's 1994 article analysed Lace from a Scandinavian perspective, placing it within the cohort of 1980s blockbuster literature. Describing it as a "good introduction" to the genre, because Lace has all its hallmarks: sex, wealth, luxury, and the "rehabilitation of the humiliated". However Larsson also argued that Lace brought new perspectives to the genre being new themes of pragmatism and resignation, behind a core story of what it is to be motherless. On sexuality, Larsson argues that whilst the novel does focus on female sexuality, it also broke ground in its discussion of male sexuality, both as a source of disappointment to women, as a way in which some of the characters - for example Prince Abdullah - use their sexuality not to please women partners but to point score against other men. Indeed male violence against women is a recurring theme.

Scott Hughes has emphasised in his critique that whilst sexuality is significant in the novel, it overshadows the parallel importance of careers and ambition for the women portrayed. Writing in 2024, Amy Burge discussed how Lace is one of the most significant works in the bonkbuster genre. She also compared it to The Flame and the Flower - an early romance novel that discussed female sexuality, published 1972. Burge also went on to note with astonishment that as of 2023, Lace did not have a Wikipedia entry.

Lace has also been studied as part of historical analysis of the use of the word in the English lacemaking industry.
