= Wychwood Brewery =

English brewery

- Interactive map of Wychwood Brewery
- Location: Witney, Oxfordshire, England
- Coordinates: 51.7832°N 1.4882°W
- Opened: 1983
- Closed: 2023
- Key people: Paddy Glenny and Ian Rogers (founders)
- Annual production volume: 50,000 UK barrels (8,200,000 litres)
- Owner: Carlsberg Britvic
- Website: www.wychwood.co.uk

Wychwood Brewery was a brewery and pub chain based in Witney, Oxfordshire, England. The brand is currently owned by Carlsberg Britvic. Hobgoblin, a 4.5% (previously 5.2%) abv brown ale, was the company's flagship brand.

Wychwood Brewery produced around 50,000 barrels (8,200,000 litres [2,200,000 US gal]) of cask ale each year, and was the United Kingdom's largest brewer of organic ales. Wychwood filtered and bottled beers are exported all over the world by their export partners Sovereign Beverage Company, to countries including North America, Germany, Sweden, France, Australia, Russia, Japan, Israel and Singapore.

The brewery was known for its character-based label artwork, inspired by the myths and legends surrounding the ancient Wychwood Forest.

Carlsberg Marston’s Brewing Company (CMBC) closed the brewery in November 2023.

== History ==
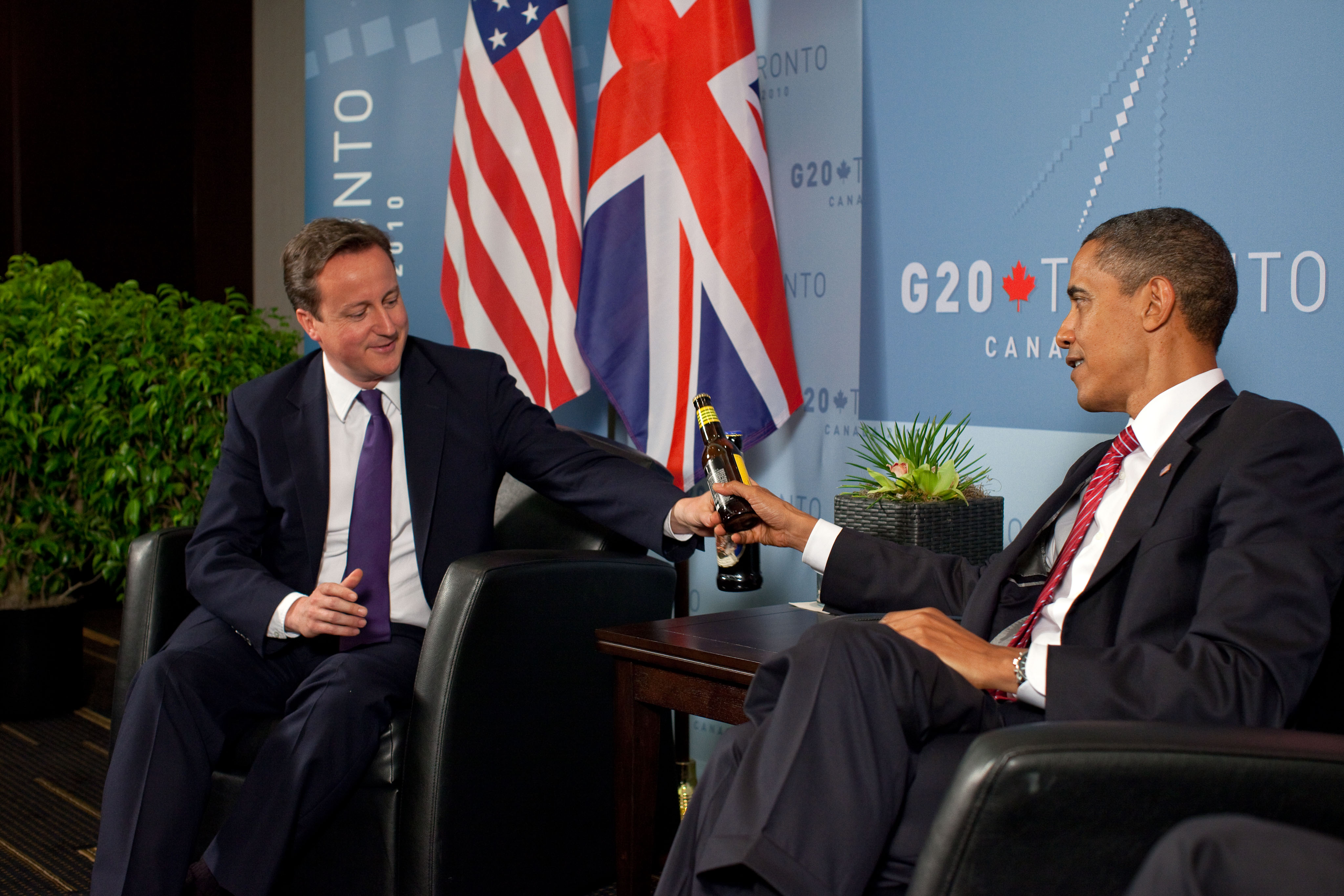
Hobgoblin being exchanged by Prime Minister David Cameron with President Barack Obama at the G20 Summit in Toronto 2010

The brewery was sited at the old Eagle Maltings, built in 1841 to malt barley for Clinch's brewery which had an estate of seventy-one pubs in Southern England. In 1961, Courage bought Clinch's for its pub estate and closed down the brewery.

In 1983, part of the original Clinch's Eagle Brewery site was rented by Paddy Glenny, who is the brother of BBC journalist Misha Glenny, after he took out a £18,000 bank loan, but named the brewing company Glenny Brewery working with junior partner Chris Moss. The first beer brewed was Eagle Bitter (changed to Witney Brewery after Charles Wells Brewery threatened legal action) followed by Wychwood Best. The brewery also exported a 7.7% barleywine, Little Gem, to the Italian market.

Paddy decided to sell the brewery in 1990 to Ian Rogers and move to British Columbia, Canada, where he rejuvenated Nelson Brewing Company. Rogers funded the buyout by selling his house and a chapel he owned in Somerset.

Rogers became managing director and retained Moss. In 1990, the Eagle was renamed the Wychwood Brewery by Rogers after the ancient Wychwood Forest which borders Witney, at the same time the brewery moved to the Two Rivers Industrial estate still in Witney.

In 1992, Rogers leased nine sites from Allied and Inntrepreneur located in town centres or university areas, revamping the pubs to feature wood fittings and stone floors with images of goblins and witches. The first Hobgoblin pub opened in Staines, Surrey, and was followed by Bristol, Bath, Brighton and High Wycombe targeting real-ale drinkers and students. During this time Rogers agreed deals with supermarkets, such as Tesco, Safeway and Waitrose, to stock Wychwood Brewery beers with Hobgoblin becoming the fifth best-selling beer in the UK.

In 1993, 3i became a key investor in the business. In 1994 the brewery was moved back to the site taking on more of the old site. Rogers employed former Firkins finance director, Paul Adams, as a finance director and took over a series of pubs naming them Hobgoblin, running a chain of 35 by 1999 using 3i to fund expansion. Rogers employed Jeremy Moss as head brewer (no relation to Chris) and in 1995 production was moved to Marston's Brewery in Burton upon Trent after James Coyle was employed as sales director.

In 1996, 12,000 Wychwood Brewery T-shirts were sold, with adverts displayed in Viz. In 2000, the company made the inaugural Sunday Times Fast Track 100 and Rogers was invited to the house of Sir Richard Branson whose Virgin Group sponsored the league table.

In 2000, a Hobgoblin pub was opened in Akasaka after Ian Rogers met businessman Mark Spencer on an EU trade mission and Rogers sent him a container of Wychwood merchandise. Another Hobgoblin pub opened a couple of years later in Roppongi which is still trading with Hobgoblin beer still being sold in Japan today.

In 2001, Chris Moss died. 3i put the business up for sale. The brewery was acquired in 2002 by Refresh UK (which was run by Rupert Thompson) and its 29 Hobgoblin pubs were acquired by Balaclava. The Hobgoblin pubs went through difficult times with new owner Balaclava falling into administration in 2003, which was then acquired by Pubs 'N' Bars plc. Pubs 'N' Bars then itself fell into administration in 2009. The pubs were sold off separately, losing their Hobgoblin branding.

In 2008, Marston's bought Refresh UK including Wychwood Brewery. Marston's brewing operations, including Wychwood Brewery, were merged with Carlsberg UK to form Carlsberg Marston’s Brewing Company in 2020. CMBC later became Carlsberg Britvic.

In September 2023 Carlsberg Marston’s Brewing Company announced its proposal to close Wychwood Brewery in November 2023 in order to "consolidate our brewing network" amid an "incredibly competitive" UK ale market and a "turbulent economic outlook". At the time of the announcement the brewery employed six people. In November 2023 the closure went ahead as announced.

== Beers ==
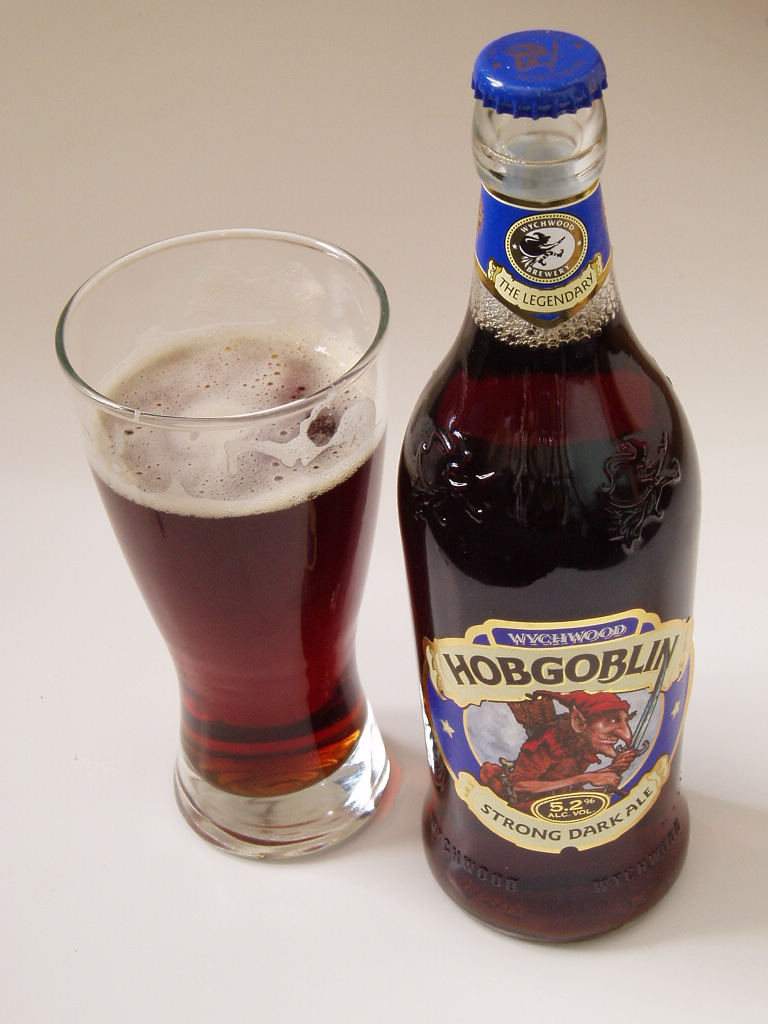
A bottle of Wychwood's flagship beer, Hobgoblin

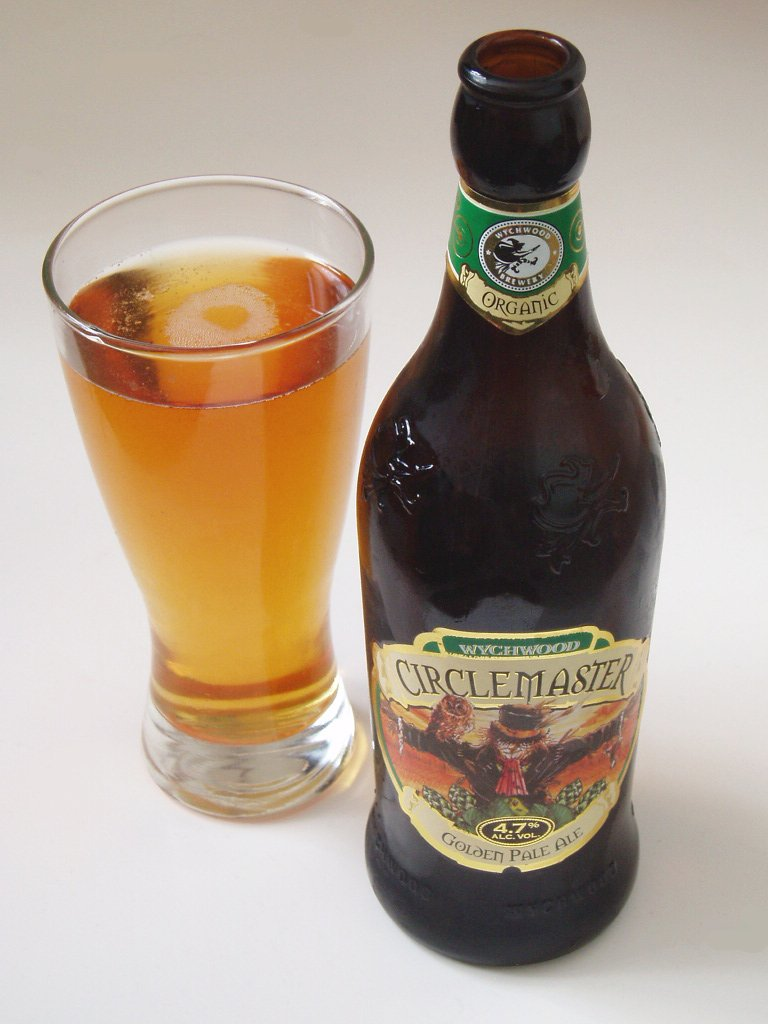
A bottle of Circle Master beer, before its re-branding as Scarecrow

=== Hobgoblin ===
Hobgoblin was the best-known and most popular beer at Wychwood Brewery originally brewed as a strong winter ale and named by Paddy Glenny. The original artwork was created first by Andy Farmer for Paddy Glenny and then illustrator Ed Org was commissioned by Ian Rogers. Dave Noonan was hired by Rogers to create the Hobgoblin font. It was the first British beer sold in supermarkets to feature a pictorial label including gold embossing and the Hobgoblin logo in colour.. Rogers used United Glass to produce a Coca-Cola-shaped clear bottle that helped it become the fifth-best selling bottled beer in the UK and exported globally.

When Rupert Thompson's Refresh took over the brewery the “What’s the matter, Lagerboy” advertising slogan was coined with an advertising spend of £150,000 in the trade press. Thompson positioned Hobgoblin as the "unofficial" beer of Halloween as well as running a campaign at the Great British Beer Festival which had the tagline 'Le Real Ale, Because You’re Worth It.'

It continues to be marketed in the wake of Wychwood Brewery's closure. It is 4.5% abv in bottles (previously 5.2%), 4.5% in cans and 4.5% (previously 5.0%, and before that 5.6%, and originally 6.5%) on cask, and is described by Wychwood as a "Ruby beer". Jeremy Moss, Wychwood's head brewer, describes the drink as "full bodied and well balanced with a chocolate toffee malt flavour, moderate bitterness and a distinctive fruity character with a ruby red glow".

During a meeting at the 2010 G-20 Toronto summit, Prime Minister David Cameron and President Barack Obama gave each other bottles of beer from their respective home towns/cities, with Cameron presenting Obama with twelve bottles of Hobgoblin, which is brewed in his Witney constituency. In return Obama gave Cameron 24 bottles of Goose Island beer, from Goose Island Brewery. The President remarked that he would drink his beer chilled, as opposed to the optimal room temperature (15.5 °C/59.9 °F) at which strong ale should be drunk, prompting Wychwood to create a T-shirt in their online store reading "What's the matter Obama, afraid you might taste something?".

=== King Goblin ===
King Goblin, essentially a stronger and more flavourful variety of Hobgoblin, is a 6.6% abv "Special Reserve" ale. To date it is still obtainable from the Marstons website.

=== Dog's Bollocks ===
Dog's Bollocks was a strong golden ale named after the British slang term dog's bollocks which was once advertised in Penthouse magazine.

=== Three Lions ===
Three Lions was a session bitter that was brewed to coincide with the football tournament Euro 96 which gained publicity for not being licensed by governing body the FA.

== Brakspear ==
Wychwood took over the brewing of the newly acquired Brakspear beers in October 2002. The new Brakspear brewery was integrated into an expansion of the Wychwood plant, and includes parts of the copper (boiling vessel), as well as some of the fermenting vessels which themselves had been refurbished at Henley. There was only one brewhouse at Witney but two separate fermenting rooms for the separate Wychwood and Brakspear beers. The original Brakspear brewery site in Henley was converted into a boutique hotel.

== Hatherwood ==
Using the name Hatherwood Brewery, Wychwood brewed beers exclusively for the supermarket Lidl. These include:

- Golden Goose
- Ruby Rooster
- Green Gecko
- Amber Adder
- Purple Panther (porter, 5% ABV)
- Gnarly Fox
- Total Legend (golden ale, 4.5% ABV)
