= LaVyrle Spencer =

American writer of historical romances

- Born: July 17, 1943 (age 83); Browerville, Minnesota, United States
- Occupations: Teacher, novelist
- Spouse: Dan Spencer
- Children: 3
- Writing career
- Pen name: LaVyrle Spencer
- Period: 1979–1997
- Genres: Romance, Historical

LaVyrle Spencer (born July 17, 1943) is an American best-selling author of contemporary and historical romance novels. She has successfully published a number of books, with several of them made into movies. Twelve of her books have been New York Times bestsellers, and Spencer was inducted into the Romance Writers of America Hall of Fame in 1988. She retired from writing in 1997.

== Biography ==
=== Personal life ===
Spencer was born on July 17, 1943, in Browerville, Minnesota, where she was raised. Shortly after her high school graduation Spencer married her high school sweetheart Dan Spencer. The couple had three daughters. They lived in a Victorian house in Stillwater, Minnesota until selling their family home in 2011. They now live in North Oaks, Minnesota.

=== Writing career ===
==== First novel ====
Although she showed a flair for writing during high school, Spencer didn't begin her first novel until she was in her thirties, working as a teacher's aide at Osseo Junior High School, she had read "The Flame and The Flower" by the bestselling author Kathleen E. Woodiwiss, which gave her the idea to become a novelist. She decided to try transferring to paper a recurring dream she was having about a story based on her grandmother's lifestyle on a Minnesota farm. She awoke at 4:00 a.m. one morning, and quickly began writing down her story in a three-ring notebook. This story became her first novel, The Fulfillment.

She sent her manuscript to best-selling novelist Kathleen E. Woodiwiss, who read it and promptly mailed it to her own editor at Avon. The editor purchased the novel, which was published in 1979. The Fulfillment was very different from the historical romance "bodice-rippers" which were popular at the time. Unlike the other novels, Spencer's debut work did not include any grand adventures, and featured a "nice man" instead of a more overbearing hero.

==== Other works ====
Spencer's second novel, Hummingbird, was rejected by her editor at Avon and also by another editor at Jove, although Jove later published the novel in 1983. Both publishing companies faulted the book for having too much humor and for being too narrow in scope, as the bulk of the book was set within a single house. Spencer opined that "drama happens within, in the emotional impact on the characters," and refused to dramatically rewrite the book.

Avon likewise rejected Spencer's third book, The Endearment, about a mail-order bride and her husband, who, unlike most heroes, was a virgin. Avon was leery of this book because it made the hero, not the heroine, the protagonist. The Endearment was later published by Pocket Books.

In these early years Spencer also wrote four category romances. She later stopped writing these shorter novels because she was disappointed with the short shelf life, generally only one month, allotted to the category romance.

Spencer's novels were highly successful, consistently selling over 1.5 million copies in paperback and over 400,000 copies in hardcover. In 1997, she released her twenty-third and last novel, Then Came Heaven. She told Publishers Weekly that she had always intended to write until she reached a set financial goal, at which point she would retire in order to travel and spend time with her family. After meeting that goal, she retired.

==== Writing style ====
Spencer is known for creating realistic characters and stories that focus on families rather than only the relationship between a man and woman. These "ordinary" men and women are warm and vulnerable and are always portrayed sympathetically. Her heroines tend to be a mix of fire and warmth, strength, savvy and tenderheartedness who must overcome some sort of adversity, such as pregnancy, divorce, a lengthy separation, the loss of a loved one, and then undergo a catharsis. The stories center on themes of abiding love, family ties and strength in difficult times.

In the 1980s and 1990s, Spencer wrote twelve New York Times Bestsellers. Her books have been sold to book clubs worldwide, and have been published around the world. Condensed versions of many of her novels have appeared in Reader's Digest and Good Housekeeping.

==== Television and film ====
Spencer has also made the leap from page to screen. Her first novel, The Fulfillment, was developed as a CBS TV movie starring Cheryl Ladd and Morning Glory, which Spencer wrote in 1989, was released as a major motion picture under the same title, starring Deborah Raffin and Christopher Reeve. Spencer and her husband appear as extras in the film.

In a television deal that Variety called “precedent–setting,” CBS TV produced two of Spencer's books for television movies, with an option on a third. Home Song, the first book produced by CBS TV, starring Lee Horsley, Polly Draper, and Deborah Raffin, aired in April 1996. The second, Family Blessings, starred Lynda Carter, and was directed by Deborah Raffin and Nina Foch. The network also bought the rights to first look at 11 other Spencer novels, as well as pre–cable broadcast rights to the theatrical film of her novel Morning Glory.

== Bibliography ==
=== Novels ===
- The Fulfillment (1979)
- The Endearment (1982)
- Forsaking All Others (1982)
- Hummingbird (1983)
- A Promise to Cherish (1983)
- The Hellion (1984)
- Sweet Memories (1984)
- Twice Loved (1984)
- Separate Beds (1985)
- Spring Fancy (1985)
- A Heart Speaks (1986)
- The Gamble (1987)
- Years (1987)
- Vows (1988)
- Morning Glory (1989)
- Bitter Sweet (1990)
- Forgiving (1991)
- Bygones (1992)
- November of the Heart (1993)
- Family Blessings (1994)
- Home Song (1995)
- That Camden Summer (1996)
- Then Came Heaven (1997)
- Small Town Girl (1997)

=== Collections ===
- The Hellion / Separate Beds / Hummingbird (1991)
- Bittersweet / Morning Glory / Vows (1991)
- Gamble / Endearment / Forgiving (1992)
- Years / Twice Loved / Spring Fancy (1993)
- Morning Glory / Vows/ the Gamble (1994)
- Bygones / Separate Beds / Bitter Sweet (1994)
- Hummingbird / Twice Loved / Vows (1994)
- Separate Beds / Forsaking All Others / Promise to Cherish (1995)
- The Endearment / Bitter Sweet / Forgiving (1995)
- Bygones / November of the Heart / Family Blessings (1996)
- For the Heart: Sweet Memories / a Matter of Circumstance / Afterglow (1997)
- Home Song / That Camden Summer / Small Town Girl (1999)

=== Omnibus in collaboration ===
- Sweet Memories / One Tough Texan (1999) (with Jan Freed)

== Recognition ==
Year	Honor	Notes	Ref.
1983	RITA Award Golden Medallion for Mainstream Historical Romance, for The Endearment	Presented by the Romance Writers of America	
1984	RITA Award Golden Medallion for Historical Romance, for Hummingbird	Presented by the Romance Writers of America	
1985	RITA Award Golden Medallion for Historical Romance, for Twice Loved	Presented by the Romance Writers of America	
1988	RITA Award Golden Medallion for Historical Romance, for The Gamble	Presented by the Romance Writers of America	
1990	RITA Award for Best Romance of 1989, for Morning Glory	Presented by the Romance Writers of America	

Because Spencer won three RITA Awards in a single category, Spencer was inducted into the RWA Hall of Fame in 1988, becoming one of only 16 women (as of April 2026) to have been so honored.
