= Mr. Romance =

- Created by: Gene Simmons
- Starring: Fabio (host)
- Country of origin: United States

Production
- Running time: 45–50 minutes

Original release
- Network: Oxygen
- Release: 2005

Mr. Romance is a 2005 US tongue-in-cheek reality television show which aired on Oxygen. It was created by Gene Simmons and hosted by Fabio.

Mr. Romance featured a group of 12 male contestants, mentored by Fabio, entering a "romance academy" hoping to win a shot at novel cover fame. Each week the contestants would compete in romance-related events like romance novel cover photo shoots and learning to dance, with each contestant rated on their facility in the activity. The two lowest-scoring contestants at the end of the regular season were eliminated and the remaining ten contestants went on to compete in the Mr. Romance Pageant to select the winner. Fabio delivered show-ending homilies on the lesson of each episode.

At the pageant, Randy Richwood was crowned Mr. Romance.

== Contestants ==
- Andrew Larsen: Fisherman from Alaska
- Mark Mast: Model and Personal Trainer from Montreal Canada
- Bruce Blauer: Bartender from Montana
- Charles Gladish: Carpenter and Erotic Dancer from Idaho
- Hakan Emden: Hair Model and Soccer Coach, lives in LA but from Turkey
- Justin Dryer: Graphic Artist and Hula Dancer from Hawaii
- Adam Hatley: Actor and Model from California
- Randy Ritchwood: Truck Driver from New Jersey
- Scott Alexander: Model from Missouri
- Tom "TJ" Jones: Actor from Cleveland Ohio
- Anthony Catanzaro: Trainer and Professional Dancer from New York
