= Pino Daeni =

Italian painter

- Born: Giuseppe Dangelico; November 8, 1939; Bari, Italy
- Died: May 25, 2010 (aged 70); New Jersey, U.S.
- Known for: Painter Illustration

Pino Daeni (November 8, 1939 – May 25, 2010) was an Italian-American book illustrator and artist. He is known for his style of feminine, romantic women and strong men painted with loose but accurate brushwork. Considered one of the highest paid book illustrators of his time, he created over 3,000 book covers, movie posters and magazine illustrations.

== Biography ==
Born Giuseppe Dangelico Daeni in Bari, Italy, in November 8, 1939, his talents were recognized by his first grade teacher, who advised Pino's father, Tommaso Dangelico, to encourage his son's artistic precociousness. However, Tommaso remained skeptical of his son's future as an artist.

He was a self-taught artist. Eventually, Pino enrolled at the Art Institute of Bari, then went on to Milan’s Academy of Brera in 1960, where he honed his craft for painting from the live nude.

From 1960 to 1979, his work garnered several prizes and awards. During this period, he was commissioned by two of Italy's largest publishers, Mondadori and Rizzoli, for numerous book illustrations. After a visit to Manhattan in 1971, Pino's experiences of the art scene at that period led him to feel restricted in Milan, and in 1978, he moved to New York, where he believed the artistic freedom would allow him greater opportunities. He brought with him his family—wife Chiara, seven-year-old daughter Paola, and five-year-old son Max.

Under the sponsorship of the Borghi Gallery, he held several shows in New York and Massachusetts. His work caught the attention of both Dell and Zebra Book Publishers, and soon after, Bantam, Simon & Schuster, Penguin USA, Dell, and Harlequin. His romance novel covers, painted for such authors as Danielle Steel, Sylvie Summerfield and Amanda Ashley, helped sell millions of books using a then unknown fellow Milanese Italian model named Fabio. By the end of his career, he had designed about 3,000 book covers.

In 1992, Pino felt the strain of tight deadlines. Eager to leave illustration behind to return to his impressionist revival painting, he contacted one of the major galleries in Scottsdale, Arizona and sent five paintings, which were well received. From then on, his paintings appeared in Hilton Head Island, South Carolina and in Garden City, Long Island, NY. Pino made several appearances on major TV networks, and was interviewed in national and international journals.

In 2001, Pino's son, Max, began representing his artist-father, despite Pino's initial reluctance. Max successfully grew his efforts into a profitable marketing company, helping his father expand beyond his normal gallery representation to include magazines, books and limited edition fine art prints.

His work continues to appear in art galleries all over the world, and his giclée prints sell into the thousands of dollars.

On May 25, 2010, Pino died at the age of 70 due to cancer.

== Influences ==
Pino was deeply influenced by the Pre-Raphaelites and Macchiaioli, and after experimenting with Expressionism, he returned to his Impressionist roots. He found inspiration in the works of such artists as Sargent, Sorolla, and Boldini.

== Style ==
His subject matter often revolves around sensuous women in beaches and boudoir settings indoors in tetradic color schemes that evoke the 19th century with women that are beautiful yet confident. Pino painted with oils on linen.

His trademark brushwork is characterized by softly lit females painted with smooth greenish shadows and distinctive, thick pastel-tinted highlights, often with vibrant colored dresses and backgrounds. Noted for his ability to capture fleeting expressions and movement, his women are often lost in thought or waiting for their lovers.

== Artworks ==
- A Day at the Beach
- A Mother's Love
- A Pause
- A Place in my Heart
- A Soft Place in my Heart
- A Time to Remember
- A Touch of Yellow
- A Woman of Mystery
- Affection
- After Dinner
- After Midnight
- Afternoon Nap
- Afternoon Repose
- Afternoon Stroll
- Almost Ready
- An Enchanted Moment
- Angel From Above
- Angelica
- Anticipation
- At Rest
- at the Balcony
- At the Beach
- Ballgown
- Bedtime Stories
- Best Friends
- Boudoir
- Botanical Eden
- Breezy Day
- By the Sea
- Candlelight
- Cherished Moment
- Cliffside Retreat
- Close to Home
- Close To My Heart
- Colorful Archway
- Contemplation
- Dancing in Barcelona
- Day Dream
- Deborah Revisited
- Desire
- Desire Suite
- Drawing of a Young Boy
- Dreamcatcher
- Dreamer
- Dreaming in Color
- Dreaming Madrid
- Early Morning
- Elegant Seduction
- Enchantment
- Ester
- Ethereal Beauty
- Evening
- Evening Repose
- Evening Thoughts
- Everlasting Beauty
- Expectations
- Fanciful Dreams
- First Glance
- Flamenco in Red
- Fleeting Moments
- Flower Child
- Flower of Spain
- Golden Afternoon
- Good Old Days
- Harmony
- Harmony Suite
- Her Favorite Book
- In the Glow
- In the Late Evening
- In the Shadows
- Innocence
- Into The Night
- Isabella
- Joyous Memories
- Just Another Day
- La Diva
- Last Touch
- Late Night Reading
- Lazy Afternoon
- Long Day
- Long Stem Lovelies
- Longing For
- Long Way Home
- Love Notes
- Love Suite
- Maternal Instincts
- Mediterranean Breeze
- Mediterranean Dreams
- Memories of My Past
- Mixed Emotions
- Morning Breeze
- Morning Dreams
- Morning Reflections
- Music Lover
- My Doll
- My Favourite Time
- Mystic Dreams
- Parisian Girl
- Party Dream
- Passive Moments
- Peonies
- Pleasure Dreams
- Precious Moments
- Purity
- Rain Lullaby
- Recital
- Red Shawl
- Reflections
- Remember When
- Renegade Heart
- Restful
- Resting Time
- Royal Beauty
- Safe Harbor
- Seaside Retreat
- Seaside Gathering
- Sensuality
- Serendipity
- Shades of Pale
- Sharing Moments
- Silent Contemplation
- Silk Taffeta
- Sleeping Beauty
- Soft Light
- Solace
- Spring Flower
- Spirit of Love
- Sublime Beauty
- Summer Afternoon
- Summer Retreat
- Summertime Breeze
- Sunday Chores
- Sweet Dreams
- Sweet Repose
- Sweet Sensations
- The Country Chef
- The Dancer
- The Gathering
- The Gift
- The Good Ole Days
- The Gypsy
- The Last Dance
- The Mirror
- The Musician
- The Professor
- The Red Shawl
- The Red Viola
- The Safety of Love
- The Silk Shawl
- The Star
- The Young Peddler
- Thinking of You
- Touch of Warmth
- Touch of Yellow
- Tuscan Stroll
- Twilight
- Under the Veranda
- Untitled (Woman with a Fan)
- Waiting at the Balcony
- Warm Memories
- Wedding Night
- Whispering Heart
- White Camisole
- White Lace
- White Rhapsody
- White Sand
- Wind Swept
- Windy Day
- Windy Field
- Wistful Thinking
- Woman from Dubai
- Woman Reclining on a Bed
- Yellow Rose of Madrid
- Young Dreams
- Young Friends
