= Clench (surname) =

Clench is a surname. Notable people with the surname include:

- Andrew Clench (died 1692), English physician
- Jim Clench (1949–2010), Canadian musician
- John Clench (died 1607), English judge
- Nora Clench (1867–1938), Canadian violinist
- Ralfe Clench (c. 1762 – 1828), farmer, judge and political figure in Upper Canada
- William J. Clench (1897–1984), American malacologist
