= Hearts Aflame (novel) =

1987 romance novel

- Original Elaine Duillo cover image featuring Fabio
- Author: Johanna Lindsey
- Publisher: Avon Books
- Publication date: 1987
- Pages: 368
- ISBN: 978-0-380-89982-1
- Preceded by: Fires of Winter
- Followed by: Surrender My Love

Hearts Aflame is novel by Johanna Lindsey, originally published in June 1987 by Avon Books. It is the second book in the Haardrad Family Saga Series and Lindsey's fourteenth novel. The book reached number three in the New York Times Best Seller list for paperbacks. It has been translated into German, French, Russian, Chinese, Spanish and Greek.

Kristen Haardrad was looking for one last adventure with her brother Selig. However, nothing prepared her for the fact that they are going Viking. As soon as they landed, they were attacked then captured. Saddened by the death of her brother, Kristen disguised as a boy to avoid rape. However, when Lord Royce entered the scene. It was love at first sight, or at least for her. She could not help the mixed feelings that she had for him. She longed to escape this land of strangers, yet her feelings for Royce held her back from her freedom. Lord Royce of Wyndhurst was attracted to the Viking beauty. However, his memories of the past held him back from his attractions toward her. However, her family is not ready to lose her to this Saxon man, they will fight for her freedom. Will Royce lose his head and his heartmate in this battle against a family of strong Vikings that are out for blood?

The clinch cover illustration by Elaine Duillo was model Fabio's first big break.
