= Anthony Catanzaro =

American bodybuilder

Anthony Catanzaro (born December 18, 1970) is an American male fitness model, training consultant and bodybuilder.

== Personal life ==
He was born in Bay Shore, New York, U.S., on Long Island and now lives in New York City.

== Career ==
=== Print ===
Catanzaro has been modeling for numerous magazines and has appeared in training videos and fitness/training magazines such as Exercise, Playgirl (January 2001 centerfold), Fitness Magazine, Health & Fitness, Natural Bodybuilding, Muscle & Fitness, Fitness Plus, Men’s Exercise and Exercise for Men Only.

=== TV appearances ===
He has appeared in TV shows like Maury, Ricki, Donahue, Good Day New York and Saturday Night Live as well as in films like Carlito's Way, The Scout, Batman: Gothic and the independent film, Beef. He was a contestant on the Oxygen model search reality television program Mr. Romance.

== Bodybuilding ==
Catanzaro is a successful competitive bodybuilder with titles including Natural Bodybuilding Middleweight Champion (1998), NPC New York State Middleweight winner (2002), INBF Tournament of Champions Middleweight Champion (2001) and INBF Natural NYC Middle Weight Champion (2005).

== See also ==
- List of male underwear models
