= Morning Glory (1993 film) =

1993 film directed by Steven Hilliard Stern

- Directed by: Steven Hilliard Stern
- Screenplay by: Deborah Raffin; Charles Jarrott
- Based on: Morning Glory; 1989 novel by LaVyrle Spencer
- Produced by: Michael Viner
- Starring: Christopher Reeve; Deborah Raffin
- Cinematography: Laszlo George
- Edited by: Richard Benwick
- Music by: Jonathan Elias
- Production company: Sharmill Productions
- Distributed by: Academy Entertainment
- Release date: September 17, 1993 (New York City)
- Running time: 96 minutes
- Countries: United States; Canada
- Language: English
- Box office: $42,539 (US/Canada)

Morning Glory is a 1993 drama film written by Deborah Raffin and Charles Jarrott, directed by Steven Hilliard Stern and starring Christopher Reeve and Raffin. It is based on LaVyrle Spencer's 1989 novel of the same name.

== Plot ==
In Depression-era America, a man (Will Parker) on parole for murder answers a newspaper advertisement for a husband. It has been placed by a widow known in the nearby town of Whitney, as 'crazy Elly'. She has two children and another is on the way; they are all by her first spouse, who died in an accident.

Will is employed at Elly's farm as a hired hand, and in the months leading up to the birth of Elly's baby they fall in love. They marry, and are very happy until Will is set up for the murder of a local waitress by his former overseer. His imprisonment and a trial follow.

With the support of his loving wife and the local librarian, Will fights for his freedom and a second chance at happiness.

== Cast ==
- Christopher Reeve as Will Parker
- Deborah Raffin as Elly Dinsmore
- Lloyd Bochner as Bob Collins
- Nina Foch as Miss Beasly
- Helen Shaver as Lula Peak
- J. T. Walsh as Sheriff Reese Goodloe

== Production ==
The film was shot on location at Jackson Farm, in Maple Ridge British Columbia.
