= Lace (miniseries) =

1984 film directed by William Hale

- Genre: Drama
- Based on: Lace by Shirley Conran
- Screenplay by: Elliott Baker
- Story by: Shirley Conran
- Directed by: William Hale
- Starring: Bess Armstrong; Brooke Adams; Arielle Dombasle; Phoebe Cates
- Composer: Nick Bicât
- Country of origin: United States
- Original language: English
- No. of episodes: 2

Production
- Executive producers: Gary Adelson; David Jacobs
- Producers: Preston Fischer; Lynn Guthrie
- Production locations: Granada, Andalucía, Spain
- Cinematography: Phil Meheux
- Editor: John F. Link
- Running time: approx. 225 minutes
- Production company: Lorimar Productions

Original release
- Network: ABC
- Release: February 26 – February 27, 1984

Related
- Lace II (1985)

Lace is an American television miniseries, based on the 1982 novel of the same name by author Shirley Conran. The series aired on ABC on February 26–27, 1984. The plot concerns the search by film star Lili (Phoebe Cates) for her biological mother, who surrendered her for adoption as a newborn. Lace was one of the highest-rated television movies of the 1983–84 television season.

Lili's line "Incidentally, which one of you bitches is my mother?", addressed to her three maternal candidates — Pagan Trelawney (Brooke Adams), Judy Hale (Bess Armstrong) and Maxine Pascal (Arielle Dombasle) — was named the best line in television history by TV Guide in its 1993 issue celebrating 40 years of television.

== Plot ==
The story opens circa 1980 at an abandoned chateau in the Swiss Alps, once a prestigious boarding school, L'Hirondelle. Internationally famous film siren, Lili, travels from there to a private meeting with the elderly Hortense Boutin, whom Lili knows was paying money on behalf of one of the school's students to a family which adopted the student's illegitimate child. Lili is the child, now grown up.

The story flashes back to 1960, introducing schoolgirls Pagan Trelawney, Judy Hale, and Maxine Pascal. Each becomes entangled with a man – Pagan with Prince Abdullah of Sydon, Judy with banker Nick Cliffe, and Maxine with ice hockey player Pierre Boursal. All three romances fail, but one of the women becomes pregnant. Knowing it means ruin for the unwed mother, the three make a pact to protect her identity. All three present themselves to the local doctor, Dr. Geneste, and he agrees to assist in having the child adopted. When the doctor discovers the identity of the mother-to-be, he says, "Of the three of you, you are the one I least suspected." The child, Elizabeth Lace, is born on November 17, 1960. The mother's birth name is recorded as Lucinda Lace.

An attempt by the school's headmaster Monsieur Chardin to expel the girls is thwarted when they unearth photographs of him in a homosexual tryst with the school's chauffeur, Paul. They blackmail Chardin into allowing them to stay and graduating them with honors. The child is placed with a foster family. On their behalf, Maxine's aunt, Hortense Boutin, agrees to pay money to Felix and Angelina Dassin, a French couple who consent to raise the child until her real mother establishes herself and can come back for her someday.

The three girls, on the verge of success in their respective careers, receive a report that the child has been killed in an auto accident. Consumed with guilt and shame, the three friends have a falling out and go their separate ways. In fact, Lili survived. Felix and Angelina were gunned down by Hungarian soldiers after the accident. She was placed in a detention camp in the Eastern Bloc, where she spent the next ten years before finally escaping and eventually transforms herself into a film sex symbol.

Employing a private investigator, Lili tracks the payments to her adopted parents to Hortense, and through her, finds out about the three school friends and their pact. She knows one of them is her mother. Pagan Trelawney is now Lady Swann, a British aristocrat and the wife of a cancer researcher; Judy Hale has become a journalist, war correspondent, and publisher of Lace magazine; while Maxine Pascal is now the Countess de Chazalle, a French socialite. Hortense insists to Lili that the child is dead. But Lili defiantly proclaims, "They'll wish I was. They made their schoolgirl pact and sent me to Hell--I'll teach them what I learned there!" As she leaves, the revelation proves to be too much for Hortense to bear and she suffers a fatal heart attack and dies.

After Hortense's funeral, which Maxine, Pagan and Judy all attend and where she witnesses the extent of their estrangement from one another, Lili inveigles herself in the lives of the three women, promising each of them something of value: for Judy, an exclusive interview for her magazine; to Pagan, a very sizable donation to her cancer society charity; and for Maxine, to stop dating her son. But she also intends to ruin them if they do not reveal which of them is her mother. She assembles the three and challenges them with the mini-series' most famous line: "Incidentally...which one of you bitches is my mother?" The second part of the mini-series is driven largely by flashbacks to the three women's young adulthood, charting their career successes and returning occasionally to the present where all three are in the company of the woman who claims to be the abandoned daughter. Lili, at the end of the flashbacks, again tries to force a confession from them, but they still remain silent. Infuriated, Lili orders them to leave, but says she intends to keep the promises she made them regardless. As she ascends to her bedroom, she shocks the women by revealing the full details of her birth to the trio.

Later in the hotel bar, Judy, Pagan and Maxine all confirm that Lili was telling the truth and they all humorously agree that she is better than all of them put together. Maxine comments, "Well, at least she brought us all back together. I missed you - I really did." That last declaration finally repairs their damaged relationship. They agree Lili must be told the truth with Judy stating that this time, Lili's real mother is on her own in doing so.

Lili receives a phone call from the hotel manager, telling her that her mother wants to see her. A pair of high heels can be seen walking up the stairs. Finally, Lili's mother comes into the room and beckons her daughter to come closer. Lili slowly rises and walks toward Judy Hale, and the two embrace.

== Development ==
Lace was produced by Gary Adelson, Preston Fischer, Lynn Guthrie and David Jacobs. The original music, including the title theme, was composed by Nick Bicat. It was directed by William Hale, from a script by Elliott Baker.

The novel on which Lace is based, also titled Lace, was written by Shirley Conran. It was first published in the United States by Simon & Schuster on July 1, 1982. The hardcover edition ran to 604 pages. In the book there is a fourth "mother", a journalist named Kate, but this character does not appear in the adaptation, in which Judy is the journalist.

=== Sequel ===
Lace was followed by a two-part sequel, Lace II, which aired on ABC from May 5–6, 1985. The principal cast was identical to Lace, with two exceptions: Deborah Raffin replaced Bess Armstrong in the role of Judy Hale, and Michael Fitzpatrick replaced Simon Chandler as Nick Cliffe. The plot of Lace II involves Lili's search for the identity of her father. It used the marketing line "Which one of you bastards is my father?" The opening theme of the miniseries, "No More Lies" was composed by Nick Bicât and performed by Deniece Williams. We learn in the end that Lili's father is Prince Abdullah of Sydon, who raped Judy on her way back to school after a one-night stand with Nick Cliffe, who was already engaged.

Lace II was considered a flop because it received half the audience of its predecessor. The story was criticized for "romanticizing" sexual assault.

=== Home media ===
Lace was released on home video in the UK and Germany through Warner Bros. on March 27, 1995. It was PAL format. The German release was a UK import. Both Lace and Lace II were released on DVD through the Warner Archive Collection in 2010.

== Cast ==
Color key
Main cast ("Starring" in opening credits)
Secondary cast ("Also starring" in opening credits)
Guest cast ("Special guest star" in opening credits)

Role	Actor	
Role	Lace	Lace II
Starring
Judy Hale	Bess Armstrong	Deborah Raffin
Jennifer "Pagan" Trelawney	Brooke Adams	Brooke Adams
Maxine Pascal	Arielle Dombasle	Arielle Dombasle
Elizabeth "Lili" Lace	Phoebe Cates	Phoebe Cates
Special guest stars
Prince Abdullah of Sydon	Anthony Higgins	Anthony Higgins
Aunt Hortense Boutin	Angela Lansbury	
Raleigh		Christopher Cazenove
Also starring
Monsieur Chardin	Herbert Lom	
Dr. Geneste	Anthony Quayle	
Sir Christopher Swann	Nickolas Grace	
Count Charles de Chazalle	Leigh Lawson	
Nick Cliffe	Simon Chandler	Michael Fitzpatrick
Tom Schwartz	Trevor Eve	Ed Wiley
Pierre Boursal	François Guétary	François Guétary
Paul	Jonathan Hyde	
Selma	Honor Blackman	
Mrs. Trelawney	June Brown	
Félix	Féodor Atkine	
Angelina	Sylvia Herbert	
Daryl Webster		James Read
Werner Graff		Patrick Ryecart
General Zedd		Walter Gotell
Christopher Swann		Paul Shelley
Bank Messenger		Michael Gough
