= Clinch & Co Brewery =

Brewery in Witney, Oxfordshire, England

Clinch & Co.
- Clinch's, Eagle Brewery, Witney
- Company type: Brewery
- Founded: c.1811
- Founder: James Clinch
- Headquarters: Eagle Brewery, Witney, Oxfordshire, England

Clinch Brewery was an English brewery, located in the town of Witney, Oxfordshire. It was founded by James Clinch around 1811.

== History ==
=== Early history ===
In about 1811, John Clinch, a prominent Witney banker and landowner, and his son James Clinch purchased the Marlborough Head PH at Church Green, Witney. James founded the first Clinch Brewery at the Marlborough Head between 1811 and 1814. His brother John Williams Clinch I was also involved in the enterprise. John Williams Clinch I inherited control of the family bank, J.W. Clinch and Sons, in 1828. (Controlling interest in the bank was sold in 1878 and the bank was later absorbed by Barclays Bank in 1907).

After the death of his brother James in 1857, John Williams I assumed control of the brewing aspect of the now extensive Clinch business portfolio (including banking, landowning and farming among other interests). The early death of his eldest son John Williams Clinch II in 1861 led to the brewing and other businesses coming under the day-to-day management of second son William Clinch. The family business seems to have come more firmly under the control of William and his brother James Jr by 1867, after the discovery that an ailing and increasingly senile John Williams I was found to be misappropriating funds from the family banking business. John Williams Clinch I died in 1871 and William and James Jr's control of the brewery and other businesses was formalised as part of an extensive family indenture document in 1874. The indenture resolved several disputes and required William and James to effectively 'buy out' a large number of family members for large cash sums and yearly annuities, plus pay the gambling debts of a younger brother. The indenture marked the partial dismemberment of the business 'empire' which had been built by John Williams Clinch I and his father John.

James Jr died in 1877 leaving William with a controlling interest. William's only son died young, so in 1883 William went into partnership with his sons-in-law Thomas William Foreshew and Bellingham Arthur Somerville. Upon William's death in 1891, his brewery business interests passed to both sons in law. William had managed to hold the family business together after 1874 and left a considerable estate, but he was known for eccentricities, such as storing potted venison in the Witney church tower (Bee). However, his death marked the end of 100 years of prominent Clinch family involvement in Witney affairs.

John Williams Clinch III missed inheriting the Witney brewing business because it passed to his uncle William Clinch upon the early death of his father in 1861. At the time John Williams III was a Brewers Clerk at the brewery in Witney. In 1863, he rented the Lake Brewery in Douglas, Isle of Man, with this coming into his ownership in about 1868. The Isle of Man Clinch & Co Brewery was prominent in the latter part of the 19th century and enjoyed some success during the early half of the 20th century. However in 1945, the company and brewery were absorbed by Castletown Brewery.

=== 1890-1940 ===
In 1890, the Clinch partnership bought the Blanket Hall Brewery in Witney. In 1892, a further restructure saw the business begin trading as Clinch and Co, with an initial share capital of 4000 £10 shares divided equally between Foreshew and Somerville. Foreshew died in 1927 during a period of financial uncertainty and profit warnings brought about due to agricultural readjustments in the post World War I years. He was succeeded by his son Thomas William Clinch Foreshew.

The rise in the importance of bottled beer during the late 1920s and 1930s stabilised business conditions and brought a measure of prosperity. The appointment of L.B. Clark as a brewer in 1937 stimulated sales further and many exhibitions prizes bore testimony to Clark's brewing skills. Against this was set the poor structural condition of tied houses, the repair of which caused considerable financial difficulties for the business between 1937 and 1940.

=== 1940-1990 ===
World War II saw output restrictions and bomb damage to the maltings, but buildings controls averted the crippling cost of buildings repairs in the tied estate. From 1940 profits recovered steadily until an immediate post war boom led to a doubling of profits compared to the 1940 low.

Family interest in the brewery was ended with the retirement of Thomas William Clinch Foreshew in 1945. He was followed by a manager who was appointed from a large northern brewery. This manager, later Managing Director, managed the company well through the 1950s, but with the link between the founding family and the company broken, there was less incentive to remain independent. Economies of scale meant that Clinch and Co was vulnerable to a take-over from a larger company and in 1962 an offer from Courage was accepted. Courage’s were said to be interested in the tied estate and closed the brewery soon after. Clinch and Co went into voluntary liquidation in 1967, though the legal entity "Clinch and Co" may have survived in Courage's hands until 1977.

The Brewery lay more or less dormant until the site was bought by Paddy Glenny in the 1980s who opened "Eagle Brewery" in the cellar of the original Clinchs Eagle Maltings.

In 1990, Eagle was renamed Wychwood Brewery, and was taken over in 2002 by Refresh UK, a subsidiary of Marston's. Wychwood is now a successful brewing business, which is still based around the original Clinchs Eagle Maltings buildings.

== See also ==
- Wychwood Brewery
- Clinch & Co Brewery (Isle of Man)
