= Andrew Clench =

Andrew Clench, M.D. (died 1692), was an English physician.

Clench was descended from the family of that name seated in Suffolk. He was created M.D. at Cambridge by royal mandate on 29 March 1671, was admitted a candidate of the College of Physicians on 22 December 1677, and a fellow on 23 December 1680. He had become a fellow of the Royal Society on 22 April in the last-named year.

Clench resided in Brownlow Street, Holborn. He was murdered between nine and eleven o'clock on the night of Monday, 4 January 1692. Evelyn wrote that "This week, a most execrable murder was committed on Dr. Clench, father of that extraordinary learned child whom I have before noticed. Under pretence of carrying him in a coach to see a patient, they strangled him in it, and sending away the coachman under some pretence, they left his dead body in the coach, and escaped in the dusk of the evening".

A swindler named Henry Harrison, to whose mistress Clench had lent money, was convicted of the murder and hanged on 15 April 1692. By his wife Rose, Clench had two sons, Edmund and John. From his will, we learn that he died possessed of property in Norfolk, of the manor and advowson of Monk Soham, Suffolk, and the lordship of Blomvile's or Woodcroft Hall in the same parish. Evelyn has left a charming account of Clench's gifted son referred to above, who, when Evelyn saw him, was not twelve years old. "It is gratifying to know that no pressure was brought to bear upon him, and that he usually played amongst other boys four or five hours every day, and that he was as earnest at his play as at his study".
