= Kathleen E. Woodiwiss =

American novelist (1939–2007)

Kathleen Erin Hogg Woodiwiss
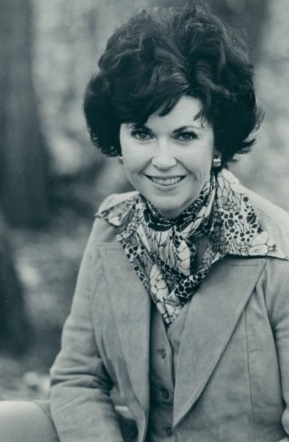
- Woodiwiss in 1977
- Born: Kathleen Erin Hogg; June 3, 1939; Alexandria, Louisiana, U.S.
- Died: July 6, 2007 (aged 68); Princeton, Minnesota, U.S.
- Resting place: Karmel Covenant Church Cemetery, Isanti County, Minnesota
- Occupation: Novelist
- Spouse: Ross Eugene Woodiwis (1956–1996)
- Children: 3
- Writing career
- Pen name: Kathleen E. Woodiwiss or Kathleen Woodiwiss
- Period: 1972–2007
- Genre: Romance
- Notable work: The Flame and the Flower

Kathleen E. Woodiwiss (born Kathleen Erin Hogg, June 3, 1939 – July 6, 2007) was an American novelist. She pioneered the historical romance genre with the 1972 publication of her novel The Flame and the Flower.

== Early life ==
She was born Kathleen Erin Hogg in Alexandria, Louisiana, the youngest of eight children of Charles Wingrove Hogg, a disabled World War I veteran, and his wife, Gladys, née Coker. As a child, she relished creating her own stories, and by age six, was telling herself stories at night to help fall asleep. Her father died suddenly when Woodiwiss was only 12, leaving her to be raised by her mother and older sisters. Woodiwiss would later remark that, "every single one of us had minds of our own even then; I was no exception. I suppose that carried over into my creations of heroines who weren't weak-willed."

== Career ==
At age 16, she met U.S. Air Force Second Lieutenant Ross Eugene Woodiwiss at a dance. They married the following year, on July 20, 1956. She attended school locally and graduated in 1957. Her husband's military career led them to live in Japan, where she worked part-time as a fashion model for an American-owned modeling agency. After over three years in Japan, the family moved to Topeka, Kansas and then settled in Minnesota. During these years, she attempted to write a novel several times, but each time stopped in frustration at the slow pace of writing in longhand. After buying her husband an electric typewriter as a Christmas present, she appropriated the machine to begin her novel in earnest.

Her debut novel, The Flame and the Flower, was rejected by agents and hardcover publishers as being too long at 600 pages. Rather than follow the advice of the rejection letters and rewrite the novel, Woodiwiss instead submitted it to paperback publishers. The first publisher on her list, Avon, quickly purchased the novel. Editor Nancy Coffey provided a $1500 advance and arranged for an initial 500,000 print run. The Flame and the Flower was revolutionary, featuring an epic historical romance with a strong heroine and actual sex scenes. This novel, published in 1972, sold over 2.3 million copies in its first four years of publication and is credited with spawning the modern romance genre, becoming the first romance novel "to [follow] the principals into the bedroom." The success of this novel prompted a new style of writing romance, concentrating primarily on historical fiction tracking the monogamous relationships between helpless heroines and the heroes who rescued them, even if they had been the ones to place them in danger. The romance novels which followed in her example featured longer plots, more controversial situations and characters, and more intimate and steamy sex scenes.

Woodiwiss had a direct impact on the career of fellow novelist LaVyrle Spencer. Soon after finding her own success, Woodiwiss read a manuscript written by Spencer, who had yet to earn a publishing contract. Woodiwiss promptly mailed Spencer's novel to her own editor at Avon. The editor purchased the novel, The Fulfillment, beginning Spencer's career. In addition, many modern romance novelists cite Woodiwiss as their inspiration. Julia Quinn remarked that "Woodiwiss made women want to read. She gave them an alternative to Westerns and hard-boiled police procedurals. When I was growing up, I saw my mother and grandmother reading and enjoying romances, and when I was old enough to read them myself, I felt as if I had been admitted into a special sisterhood of reading women."

Woodiwiss published twelve best-selling romance novels, with over thirty-six million copies in print. Woodiwiss was known for the quality of her novels rather than the quantity of works she published. She often took four to five years to write a single novel. In some cases, Woodiwiss attributed the lag in publication time to personal and health issues, while in others she confessed to having suffered burnout and needing a rest to recover her interest in writing.

All of her novels were historical romances set in varied backgrounds, including the American Civil War, 18th-century England, or Saxony in the time of William the Conqueror. The heroines of the novels are strong-willed young women with "a spark of life and determination." Woodiwiss describes her novels as "fairy tales. They are an escape for the reader, like an Errol Flynn movie."

== Later life ==
Woodiwiss was an avid equestrienne who at one time lived in a large house on 55 acres (220,000 m^{2}) in Minnesota. After her husband's death in 1996, she moved back to Louisiana. She died in a hospital in Princeton, Minnesota, aged 68, from cancer.

She was survived by two sons, Sean and Heath, their wives, and numerous grandchildren. A third son, Dorren, predeceased her. Her final book, Everlasting, was released on October 30, 2007.

== Reception ==
Laura Kinsale in her essay "The Androgynous Reader" in Dangerous Men and Adventurous Women cites the heroine of Shanna as proof that the average romance reader is not identifying with the heroine, but rather as a placeholder for themselves to be with the hero, for a "sillier and more wrongheaded heroine than Shanna would be difficult to imagine...Feminists need not tremble for the reader--she does not identify with, admire, or internalize the characteristics of either a stupidly submissive or an irksomely independent heroine. The reader thinks about what she would have done in the heroine's place."

== Selected works ==
=== Birmingham Family Saga series ===
1. The Flame and the Flower, 1972
2. "The Kiss" in THREE WEDDINGS AND A KISS, 1995 (with Catherine Anderson, Loretta Chase, Lisa Kleypas)
3. "Beyond the Kiss" in MARRIED AT MIDNIGHT, 1996 (with Jo Beverley, Tanya Anne Crosby, Samantha James)
4. The Elusive Flame, 1998
5. A Season Beyond a Kiss, 2000

=== Single novels ===
- Wolf and the Dove, 1974
- Shanna, 1977
- Ashes in the Wind, 1979
- A Rose in Winter, 1981
- Come Love a Stranger, 1984
- So Worthy My Love, 1989
- Forever in Your Embrace, 1992
- Petals on the River, 1997
- The Reluctant Suitor, 2002
- Everlasting, 2007
