= Johanna Lindsey =

American novelist (1952–2019)

- Born: Johanna Helen Howard; March 10, 1952; Frankfurt, West Germany
- Died: October 27, 2019 (aged 67); Nashua, New Hampshire, U.S.
- Occupation: Writer
- Spouse: Ralph Lindsey
- Children: 3
- Writing career
- Pen name: Johanna Lindsey
- Period: 1977–2019
- Genre: Historical Romance

Johanna Helen Lindsey (née Howard, March 10, 1952 – October 27, 2019) was an American writer of historical romance novels. All of her books reached the New York Times bestseller list, many reaching No. 1.

== Personal life ==
Johanna Helen Howard was born on March 10, 1952, in Frankfurt, West Germany. Her mother was Wanda Donaldson Howard, a personnel management specialist. Her father was Edwin Dennis Howard, a soldier in the U.S. Army, stationed in West Germany, where she was born. The Howard family moved about a great deal when she was young due to her father's military career.

Her father always dreamed of retiring to Hawaii, but he died in 1964. That year, her family moved to Hawaii, likely to honor his wish.

In 1970, after she graduated school, she went on a blind date with Ralph Bruce Lindsey, whom she married 4 months later. The couple resided in Hawaii and had three children; Alfred, Joseph and Garret. After her husband's death, Lindsey moved to Maine and did not remarry.

== Writing career ==
Lindsey wrote her first book, Captive Bride, in 1977 "on a whim". The book was a success, as have been the forty-nine novels that followed. As of 2006 more than fifty-eight million copies of her books had been sold worldwide, and her work has been translated into twelve languages.

== Style ==
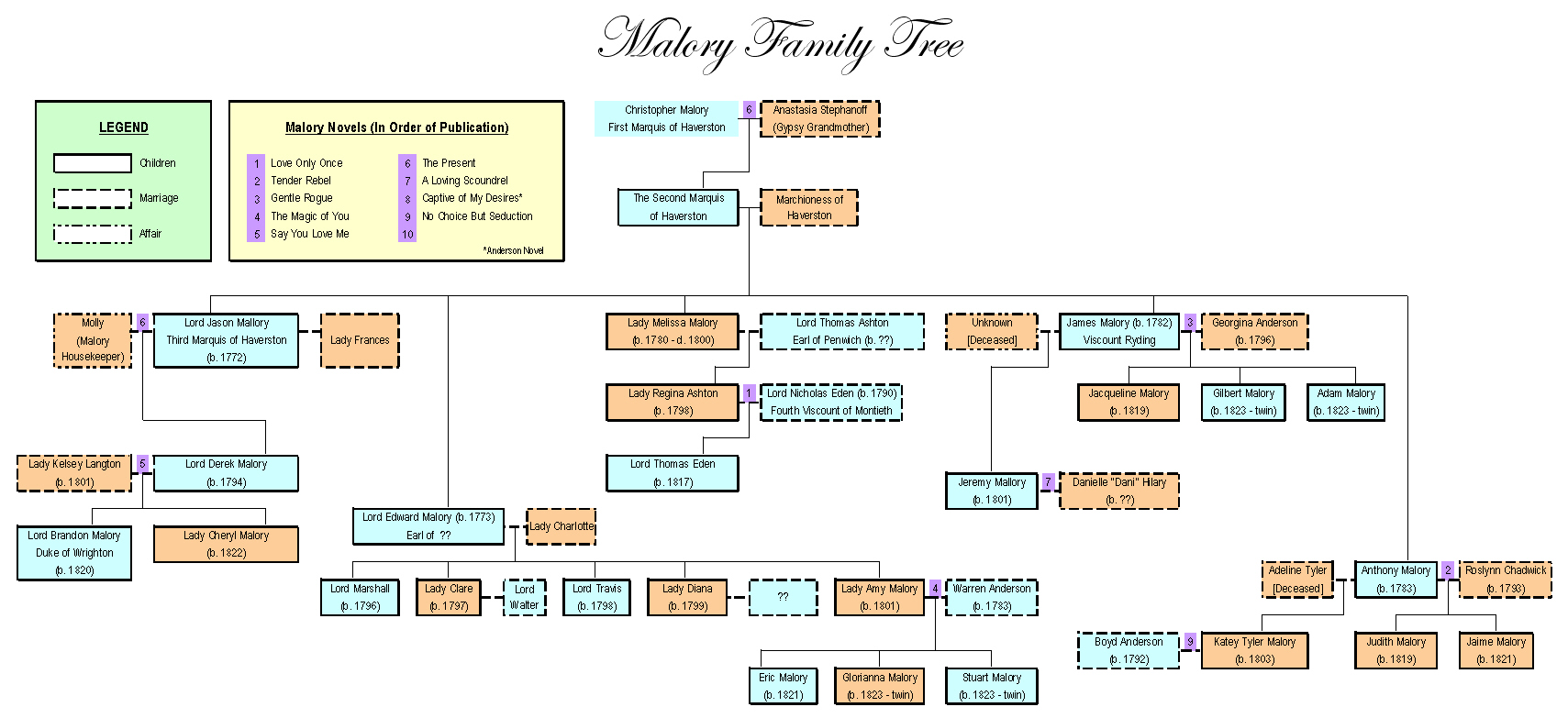
Family tree of the Malory family from Lindsey’s novels set in the Regency era.

Owing to their diversity of settings Lindsey's work covers a number of romance subgenres, including historical fiction (medieval, Regency, American frontier, and Viking eras) and science fiction.

Richard Sandomir of The New York Times explained,

Lindsey set her passionate tales in many locales, including the Caribbean; the Barbary Coast; England as early as the year 873; Norway, when the Vikings ruled; 19th-century Texas, Wyoming and Montana; and the planet Kystran, in a series of science-fiction bodice-rippers.

== Bibliography ==
=== By Reading Order ===
==== Viking Haardrad Family Saga Series ====
1. Fires of Winter (1980)
2. Hearts Aflame (1987)
3. Surrender My Love (1994)

==== Southern Series ====
1. Glorious Angel (1982)
2. Heart of Thunder (1983)

==== Deep space/ Ly-san-ter Family Saga ====
1. Warrior's Woman (1990)
2. Keeper Of The Heart (1993)
3. Heart Of A Warrior (2001) (Deep space - Earth)

==== Wyoming westerns series ====
1. Brave the Wild Wind (1984)
2. Savage Thunder (1989)
3. Angel (1992)

==== Malory-Anderson Family Saga Series ====
1. Love Only Once (1985) (Regina Ashton/Nicholas Eden)
2. Tender Rebel (1988) (Anthony Malory/Roslynn Chadwick)
3. Gentle Rogue (1990) (James Malory/Georgina Anderson)
4. The Magic of You (1993) (Amy Malory/Warren Anderson)
5. Say You Love Me (1996) (Derek Malory/Kelsey Langton)
6. The Present (1998) (Christopher Malory/Anastasia Stephanoff)
7. A Loving Scoundrel (2004) (Jeremy Malory/Danette "Danny" Hilary)
8. Captive of My Desires (2006) (Drew Anderson/Gabrielle Brooks)
9. No Choice But Seduction (2008) (Boyd Anderson/Katey Tyler)
10. That Perfect Someone (2010) (Richard Allen/Julia Miller)
11. Stormy Persuasion (2014) (Judith Malory/Nathan Tremayne)
12. Beautiful Tempest (2017) (Jacqueline Malory/Damon Reeves)

==== Straton Family Saga Series ====
1. A Heart So Wild (1986)
2. All I Need Is You (1997)

==== Medieval (Shefford's Knights) Series ====
1. Defy Not the Heart (1989)
2. Joining (1999)

==== Cardinia's Royal Family ====
1. Once a Princess (1991)
2. You Belong to Me (1994)

==== Sherring Cross Series ====
1. Man of My Dreams (1992)
2. Love Me Forever (1995)
3. The Pursuit (2002)

==== Locke Family Series ====
1. The Heir (2000) (Duncan MacTavish and Sabrina Lambert)
2. The Devil Who Tamed Her (2007) (Raphael Locke and Ophelia Reid)
3. A Rogue of My Own (2009) (Rupert St. John and Rebecca Marshall)
4. Let Love Find You (2012) (Devin Baldwin and Amanda Locke)

==== Montana Series ====
1. One Heart to Win (2013) (Tiffany Warren & Hunter Callahan)
2. Wildfire in His Arms (2015) (Maxine & Degan Grant)
3. Marry Me by Sundown (2018) (Violet Mitchell & Morgan Callahan)

==== Single novels ====
- Captive Bride (1977)
- A Pirate's Love (1978)
- Paradise Wild (1981)
- So Speaks the Heart (1983)
- A Gentle Feuding (1984)
- Tender Is the Storm (1985)
- When Love Awaits (1986)
- Secret Fire (1987)
- Silver Angel (1988)
- Prisoner of My Desire (1991)
- Until Forever (1995)
- Home for the Holidays (2000)
- A Man to Call My Own (2003)
- Marriage Most Scandalous (2006)
- When Passion Rules (2011)
- Make Me Love You (2016)
- Temptation's Darling (2019)

=== By Setting ===
==== Middle Ages ====
Medieval Vikings

- Fires of Winter (1980)
- Hearts Aflame (1987)
- Surrender My Love (1994)

===== Medieval England =====
- So Speaks the Heart (1983)
- A Gentle Feuding (1984)
- When Love Awaits (1986)
- Defy Not the Heart (1989)
- Prisoner of My Desire (1991)
- Joining (1999)

==== Early Modern Times ====
Arabian Dunes

- Captive Bride (1977)
- Silver Angel (1988)

Caribbean

- A Pirate's Love (1978)

=== Regency England ===
- Love Only Once (1985)
- Tender Rebel (1988)
- Gentle Rogue (1990)
- The Magic Of You (1993)
- Say You Love Me (1996)
- The Present (1998)
- A Loving Scoundrel (2004)
- Captive of My Desires (2006)
- No Choice But Seduction (2008)
- Stormy Persuasion (2014)
- Make Me Love You (2016)

=== Regency England & Scotland ===
- Man of My Dreams (1992)
- Love Me Forever (1995)
- Home for the Holidays (2000)
- The Heir (2000)
- The Pursuit (2002)
- Marriage Most Scandalous (2006)
- The Devil Who Tamed Her (2007)
- A Rogue of My Own (2009)
- Let Love Find You (2012)
- Temptation's Darling (2019)

==== Eastern Europe ====
- Secret Fire (1987) (London --> Russia)
- Once a Princess (1991) (U.S. --> Cardinia)
- You Belong to Me (1994) (Russia --> Cardinia)
- When Passion Rules (2011) (London --> Lubinia)

==== America in 19th century ====
- Paradise Wild (1981) (Boston --> Hawaii)
- Glorious Angel (1982) (Texas)
- Heart of Thunder (1983) (Wild West)
- Brave the Wild Wind (1984) (Wyoming)
- Tender Is the Storm (1985) (Wild West)
- A Heart So Wild (1986) (Texas)
- Savage Thunder (1989) (Wyoming)
- Angel (1992) (Wild West)
- All I Need Is You (1997) (Wild West)
- A Man to Call My Own (2003) (Wild West)
- One Heart to Win (2013) (Wild West) (50th novel by Johanna Lindsey)
- Wildfire in His Arms (2015) (Wild West)
- Marry Me by Sundown (2018) (Wild West)

==== Paranormal Fantasy ====
Deep space/ Ly-san-ter Family Saga

- Warrior's Woman (1990)
- Keeper Of The Heart (1993)
- Heart Of A Warrior (2001) (Deep space --> Earth)

Time Travel

- Until Forever (1995) (Now --> Middle Ages)

== Legacy ==
In December 2019, her son Alfred announced that Lindsey died on October 27, 2019, at the age of 67. The cause of death was Stage 4 lung cancer.

Italian model Fabio was often featured on the cover of Lindsey's work. In 1987, Fabio first appeared on Lindsey's novel Hearts Aflame, painted by Elaine Duillo. This has been credited with launching Fabio's career as a male model. By 1992, over 55,000,000 romance novels featuring Fabio were sold. Fabio expressed his condolences in 2019 upon hearing of Lindsey's death:

I loved being featured on her covers. To this day, Man of My Dreams is still one of my all time favorites. Rest in peace, Johanna. Thank you for sharing your gift. You will be missed.
