= Elaine Duillo =

American painter and illustrator (1928–2021)

- Born: July 28, 1928; Brooklyn, New York, U.S.
- Died: July 30, 2021 (aged 93)
- Occupations: Illustrator, painter
- Spouse: John Duillo

Elaine I. Duillo (July 28, 1928 – July 30, 2021) was an American painter and illustrator known for her romance fiction book covers. She was inducted into the Society of Illustrators Hall of Fame in 2003.

== Early life ==
Duillo was born Elaine Harwetel on 28 July 1928. Her parents were William and Gerda I Harwetel.

Elaine studied at the High School of Music and Art in Manhattan, where she met John Duillo, who became an adventure fiction illustrator and gallery painter. She graduated from Pratt Institute in Brooklyn. She began her career in 1959, illustrating adventure story magazines and Gothic novels.

== Career ==
Duillo is known for her prolific, eye-catching, realism painting for romance paperback covers. Her painting style is one of "characteristically flawless draftsmanship, evocative mood and compositional power", and uses "layer upon layer of transparent acrylic washes to achieve a luminous effect". She is credited not only with breaking through into a male-dominated field in the early 1960s, but with redefining romance art at the end of the 1970s and early 1980s, introducing more men and male nakedness into her cover art, and influencing other illustrators who followed her style. She is also credited with aiding the rise to fame of the model Fabio Lanzoni when she began using him as a model, first on the clinch cover illustration for Johanna Lindsey's Hearts Aflame.

She worked for paperback publishers including Ace, Airmont, Avon, Balcourt Art Service, Bantam, Berkley, Crescent, Dell, Fawcett Gold Medal, Lancer, Penguin USA, Playboy Press, Pocket Books, New American Library and Zebra Kensington.

She retired from book cover illustration in early 2003. In her acceptance speech for her induction to the Society of Illustrators Hall of Fame, she summarized her career saying, "[T]his field has been rewarding to me and in return I've tried to elevate romance illustration to an art form. At least I hope I've been influential in changing the look of the genre… My work is mainly about creating fantasy – fantasy people, fantasy situations and fantasy settings. It is realistic, but upon closer inspection, my paintings portray a highly glamorized version of already attractive people and places that goes beyond realism."
