= Clinch & Co Brewery (Isle of Man) =

Brewery in Douglas, Isle of Man

Clinch's
- Company type: Brewery
- Founded: 1779 (original brewery)
- Defunct: 1946
- Headquarters: North Quay, Douglas, Isle of Man
- Owner: John Williams Clinch III

Clinch's Brewery Company was a brewery founded by John Williams Clinch III in Douglas, Isle of Man.

== History ==
John Williams Clinch III, son of John Williams Clinch II, missed inheriting the Clinch & Co Brewery, the Witney, Oxfordshire based brewing business, because it passed to his uncle William Clinch upon the early death of his father in 1861. At the time John Williams III was a Brewers Clerk at the brewery in Witney.

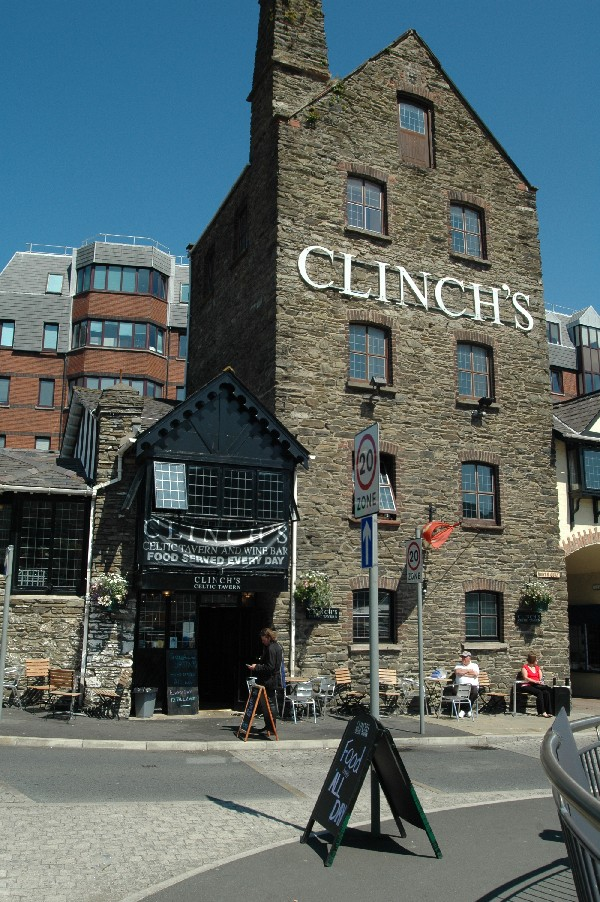

In 1863, he rented the Lake Brewery, which was founded in 1779 by George Booth, in Douglas, Isle of Man. It came into his ownership in about 1868. The brewery had a motto in Manx Gaelic, "Glen as Lajer" or "Clean and Strong" with a further motto "Troor Duirn" or "Three Fists".

Clinch and Co, Lake Brewery appears to have had a turbulent business history, with John Williams III struggling to retain direct family control of the brewery until the banks forced its flotation in the 1890s. He remained Managing Director until his death in 1905. He was prominent in Manx affairs. In addition to being the owner and Managing Director of the brewing company, he was a member of Douglas town council as well as President of the Manx Natural History and Antiquarian Society, and later stood unsuccessfully as an MHK for Douglas in the House of Keys.

The brewery survived John Williams Clinch's death in 1905 and enjoyed some success during the early half of the 20th century. However, in 1945, the company and brewery were absorbed by Castletown Brewery. Clinch and Co failed to survive post war, partly because it failed to capitalise on evolving business conditions as World War II drew to a close.

The original brewery building in North Quay, Douglas survives and is currently unoccupied.
