= John Clinch (cricketer) =

English cricketer

Personal information
- Full name: John Lawrence Clinch
- Born: 14 February 1967 (age 59); Carshalton, Surrey, England
- Batting: Right-handed
- Bowling: Slow left-arm orthodox

Domestic team information
- Years: Team
- 1994–1999: Suffolk

Career statistics
Competition	List A
Matches	1
Runs scored	18
Batting average	18.00
100s/50s	–/–
Top score	18
Catches/stumpings	1/–
- Source: Cricinfo, 10 July 2019

John Lawrence Clinch (born 14 February 1967) is an English former cricketer.

Clinch was born at Carshalton in February 1967. He a single appearance in List A one-day cricket for Suffolk against Gloucestershire at Bristol in the 1st round of the 1995 NatWest Trophy. Batting at number three, he was dismissed by David Boden for 18 runs. He played minor counties cricket for Suffolk from 1994–93, making fifteen appearances in the Minor Counties Championship and five appearances in the MCCA Knockout Trophy.
