= Fires of Winter =

1980 novel by Johanna Lindsey

- 1980 cover of the paperback edition
- Author: Johanna Lindsey
- Cover artist: Elaine Duillo
- Language: English
- Genre: Romance
- Publisher: Avon Books
- Publication date: September 1980
- Publication place: United States
- ISBN: 0-380-75747-8
- Followed by: Hearts Aflame

Fires of Winter is a novel by Johanna Lindsey originally published in September 1980 by Avon Books. It is the first book in the Haardrad Family Saga Series.

== Plot ==
The story opens with Viking invaders coming from across the sea, taking a Celtic noblewoman named Brenna captive. Garrick Haardrad, son of the Viking cheiftan, wants Brenna for a wife, but she swears that no barbarian will ever be her master.

Garrick, the son of a Viking chieftain, is accustomed to having his wishes fulfilled. His persistent courtship of Brenna gradually overcomes her resistance, though it is his unexpectedly gentle nature that proves most disarming. Despite harbouring plans for revenge, Brenna finds herself increasingly drawn to him as their relationship develops against the backdrop of the Nordic winter.
