= Fabio Lanzoni =

Italian model, actor, and author (born 1959)

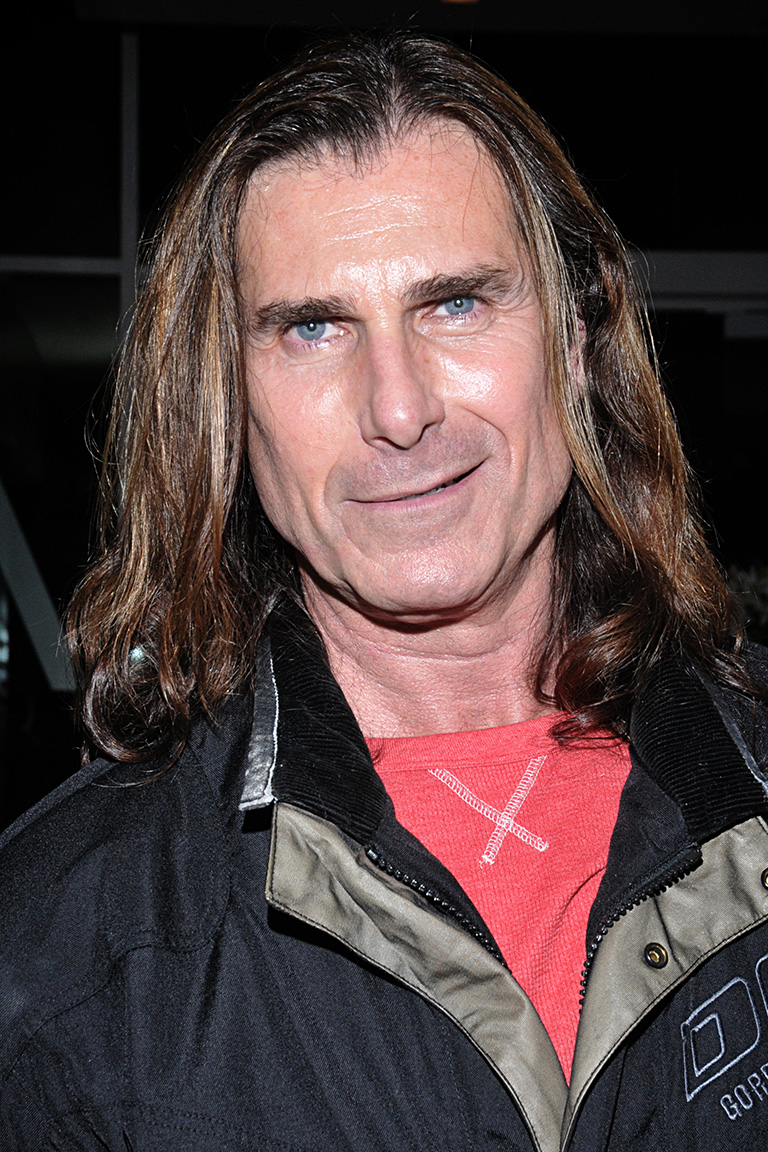
- Lanzoni in 2014
- Born: March 15, 1959 (age 67); Milan, Lombardy, Italy
- Citizenship: Italy and United States
- Occupations: Model; actor; spokesman
- Years active: 1973–2021
- Height: 1.91 m (6 ft 3 in)

Fabio Lanzoni (Italian pronunciation: [ˈfaːbjo lanˈtsoːni]; born March 15, 1959), known mononymously as Fabio, is an Italian-American actor, fashion model, and spokesman. Lanzoni is known for his wide-ranging career including work as a romance novel cover model throughout the late 1980s into the 1990s, roles in film and television including multiple cameo appearances as himself, and music and books. He was the spokesman for I Can't Believe It's Not Butter! and the American Cancer Society.

== Early life ==
Lanzoni was born March 15, 1959, in Milan, Italy, to Flora Carnicelli Lanzoni and Sauro Lanzoni, a mechanical engineer and owner of a conveyor-belt factory and/or company. Lanzoni has an older brother, Walter, and a younger sister, Cristina. Lanzoni's father wanted Lanzoni to become an engineer and take over the family business.

During the first five years of Lanzoni's life, he was raised primarily by his grandmother, whom he has called "the most influential woman" in his life. She died of cancer when Lanzoni was 13, having kept her diagnosis a secret from the family. This death severely impacted Lanzoni, inspiring him to later become the spokesperson for the American Cancer Society.

Raised Catholic, he served as an altar boy. Lanzoni claims he was "always in trouble for breaking the rules and getting kicked out of school." At three years old, Lanzoni was hospitalized after drinking liquor from the kitchen counter; this unpleasant experience "left a lasting bad impression" and caused a lasting aversion to alcohol. He claims he first became aware of his magnetism in kindergarten, then first rode a motorbike at age eight and developed a lifelong fascination with motorcycles and dirt bikes.

Lanzoni served in the Italian Army, where he was required to shave his hair. His modelling career began when he was discovered by a photographer while working out.

== Career ==
Lanzoni is best recognized for his appearance on the covers of hundreds of romance novels. In 2015, while describing his career, Lanzoni told The Guardian,

I'd be the biggest hypocrite if I said I really worked very hard for my career, because it was given to me on a silver platter. I can't take any credit. My major focus was sports and going to the gym.

=== Television and media ===
Lanzoni first came to the United States at the age of 13; he intended to stay, but his parents forbade him due to his age. Lanzoni hoped to live in America, calling it "the greatest country in the world."

At 14 years old (circa 1973), Fabio received his first modeling contract in Italy. In 2015, he described the event to The Guardian:

My career started when I was barely 14 years old. I was in Milan, at the gym, and one of the two biggest photographers in Europe, Oliviero Toscani, came up to me and said, "You should model." I wasn't in the industry, so I had no idea who he was. I remember giving him my father's phone number. He called my father, hired me for a big campaign and things took off from there.

In his teenage years, Lanzoni participated in such sports as horseback riding, windsurfing, and slalom and downhill skiing. In 1975, when Lanzoni was 16, he became a ski-racing champion in his hometown of Milan. However, he broke his leg while skiing a slalom course; he was placed in traction for a week and in a cast for four months. His doctor suggested weight lifting as physical therapy, and Lanzoni "fell in love" with the training. At 19 years of age, Lanzoni dropped out of university and moved to the US, to the frustration of his parents. Lanzoni recalls, "My father was totally against it. My father always said, 'He's going to get it out of his system and come back with his tail between his legs.'"

Within 48 hours of arriving in America, Lanzoni "walked into the Ford modelling agency without an appointment and walked out with a contract." The following day, he met with Barry McKinley, whom Lanzoni called "the biggest photographer in the world" at the time. McKinley hired Lanzoni for the launch of Gap Inc. The contract was for $150,000, which was—according to Lanzoni—$30,000 more than what contemporaneous top male models in the world received. Lanzoni considered himself one of the first "really muscular" models, and he began to pose for 15 or 16 book cover photoshoots a day. Other early jobs included video shoots for Nintendo.

Lanzoni claims his first realization of his fame was in 1987, at the age of 28. That year, he modeled for romance novel Hearts Aflame by Johanna Lindsey, in a cover painted by Elaine Duillo. While dancing in a Miami nightclub, Lanzoni was recognized by three women from his appearance on romance novel covers. Prior to the encounter, Lanzoni knew he had taken photos for use in book covers, but had never seen the finished product. In a 2021 People interview, Lanzoni recalls:

[These] three girls come over and say, "You look exactly like the guy on our books!" I said, "That's a good pickup line." [After they return to show me the books,] I go like, "Oh my God, that's me." It was the first time I saw myself on the cover of the books.

More photography and film roles followed. In 1989, Lanzoni appeared as the hero Kuros on the cover of Nintendo game Ironsword: Wizards & Warriors II. In 1990, Lanzoni acted as an angel in horror film The Exorcist III. In the 1991 film Scenes from a Mall, Lanzoni is credited for the role of "Handsome Man."

In 1992, Robert Gottlieb of William Morris Agency became Lanzoni's literary agent. Avon Books signed a six figure deal with Lanzoni for three books and he became the first bestselling male romance writer to use his real name. Lanzoni published Pirate (1993), Rogue (1994), Viking (1994), Comanche (1995), and Champion (1995), all of which were written in collaboration with romance author Eugenia Riley. Lanzoni later collaborated with Wendy Corsi Staub to write Dangerous (1996), Wild (1997), and Mysterious (1998).

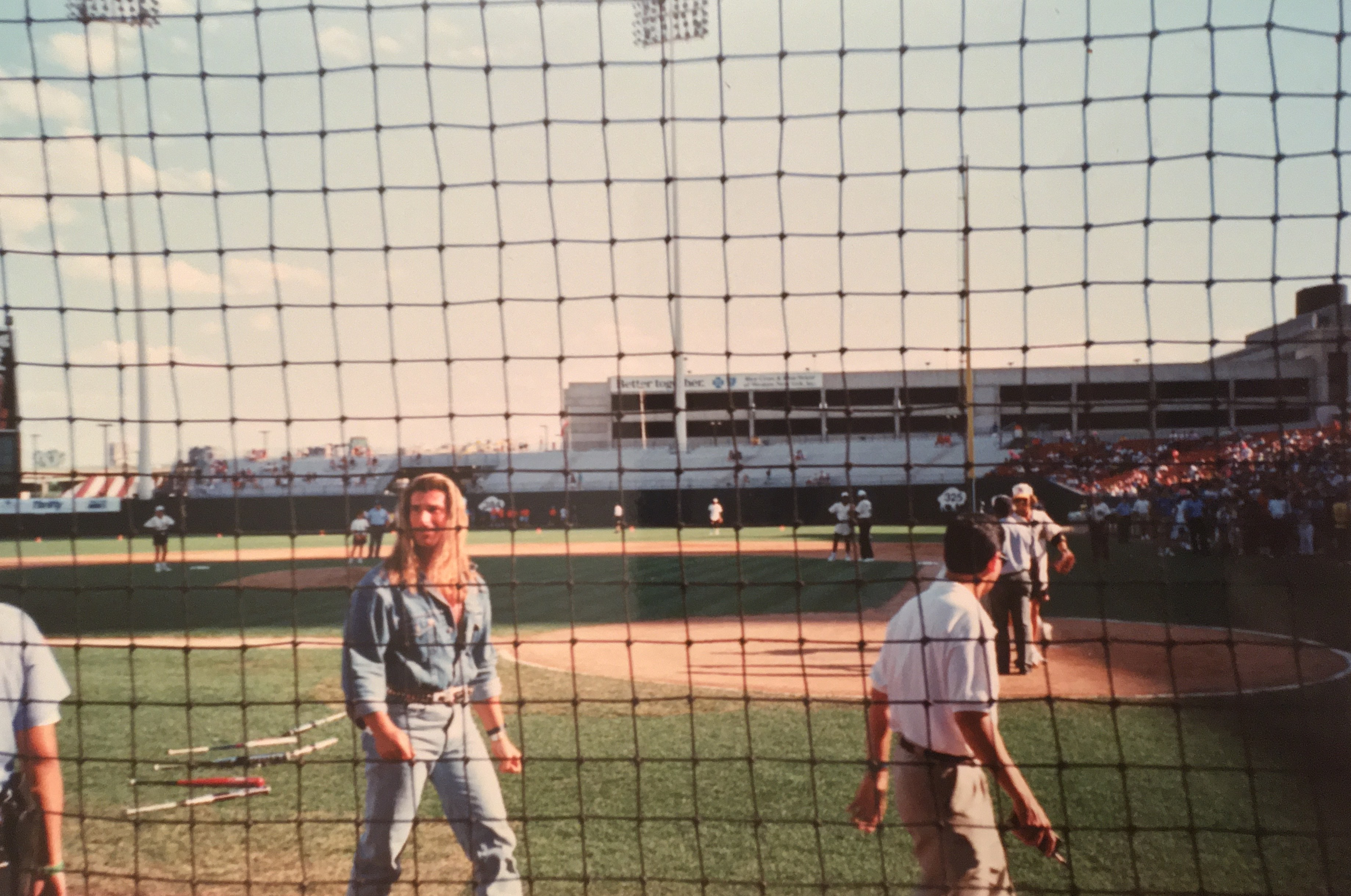
Lanzoni in 1993 (left), participating in the annual StarGaze charity event at Pilot Field in Buffalo, New York

During the Christmas season of 1992, an all-Fabio pin-up calendar for 1993 appeared in major bookstores and was a top seller. In 1993, Lanzoni released an album titled Fabio After Dark, which included 17 tracks. Billboard reported that Lanzoni's contributions "were all spoken word; he let guests like Billy Ocean and Dionne Warwick do the singing." Interspersed between the music are Lanzoni's soliloquies on his philosophies of love, such as "Fabio: On Inner Beauty" and "Fabio: On Humor."

In 1993, Versace contracted Lanzoni to model their Mediterraneum fragrance. Lanzoni alleged in 2021 that the company still owed him $1 million in profits. In 1999, the Los Angeles Times reported on a promotional meet-and-greet at the Sherman Oaks Bullock's men's fragrance department. Fans lined up to receive "a hug, an autograph, a photo taken with their own camera," and occasionally a "quick smooch."

In 1993, American author and publisher Helen Gurley Brown stated that Fabio is "terribly big and has very long hair and classic Roman coin features, so it's hard to forget what he looks like. I find him so astonishing looking that you can hardly concentrate on what he's saying. Plus, he has got good promoters who make you aware of him." That year, the Los Angeles Times claimed Hillary Clinton "flirted with [Lanzoni] on a [circa 1993] White House visit."

In 1993, Fabio's manager Peter F. Paul published Fabio's biography, Fabio. It contains over 100 photographs. According to Paul's biography, by 1992, over 55 million Fabio romance covers had been sold. Fabio's first dedication in 1995 book Fabio Fitness is to Paul; he writes:

A very special thanks to Peter F. Paul my business partner, manager, and most of all my friend. [sic] He has dedicated his indefatigable energy and creativity to working with me and creating what has come to be known as "The Fabio Phenomenon."

Around that time, Lanzoni claimed, "In the last year and a half, I can count in a hand how many days off I had. I've been working every single day, up to 17, 18 hours a day. I'm not even going to the gym anymore." Dr. Donnamarie White, romance author and creator of the official Fabio fan club, who met Fabio on multiple occasions, claims Fabio stopped modeling in 1993.

From 1993 to 1994, Lanzoni starred in the syndicated TV series Acapulco H.E.A.T. in the role of Claudio. That year, he became the spokesman for spread brand I Can't Believe It's Not Butter! In 1996, Lanzoni starred as himself in the comedy film Spy Hard. The following year, Lanzoni was featured as himself in a Step by Step episode "Absolutely Fabio." In 1998, he appeared on Late Night with Conan O'Brien doing a brief comedic sketch. In 1996, his manager Eric Ashenberg stated that Lanzoni was looking for "something more in the Errol Flynn style, something romantic."

In 1999, comedian Tom Green toured Fabio's house, an interview that included Fabio throwing him into his pool multiple times. Lanzoni revealed that his kitchen was full of dirt bikes, and he considered it an empty room, as he never ate at home. Green repeatedly asked the cost of Fabio's home sound system (possibly over one million dollars), pleaded with Fabio to take his shirt off, borrowed Fabio's tank top, and finally went on a shirtless CR250 motorcycle ride with him.

In 2000, Lanzoni had a cameo in the stoner comedy film Dude, Where's My Car? Lanzoni lampooned himself in comedy film Zoolander the following year, which featured over a dozen celebrity cameos. Screen Rant describes his cameo as one of the most memorable:

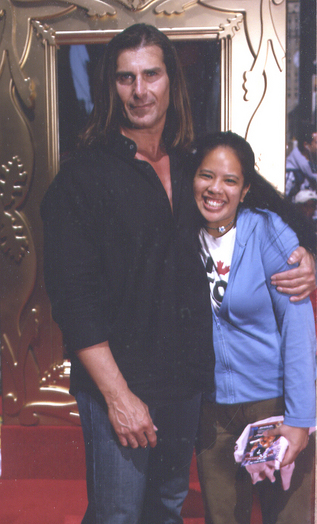
Fabio and a fan in Times Square in 2005.

Fabio is showcased in Zoolander early on. He appears after the opening sequence, as a fellow model at the ceremony the main characters attend. He is shown accepting an award before Male Model of the Year is awarded. Fabio's lines are funny, thanking the audience for naming him the best "actor slash model, and not the other way around."

In 2002, 2003, and 2012, Fabio appeared in soap opera The Bold and the Beautiful, as a close friend of the character Sally Spectra, played by Darlene Conley. In 2005, Lanzoni hosted the American reality television series Mr. Romance. The series featured a dozen male contestants competing for the title of "Mr. Romance" and the opportunity to appear as a romance novel cover model. In 2010, he was featured in Big Time Rush and played the character Captain Hawk in The Suite Life on Deck episode "Senior Ditch Day."

=== Spokesman ===
Lanzoni appeared prominently in advertising for I Can't Believe It's Not Butter! and has been the spokesman for the company since 1994. He was also the spokesman for the Geek Squad in 2007, Oral-B's Sensitive Advantage Toothbrush in 2006 (whose ad was featured in Times Square), and one of his most popular ads to date is for Nationwide Insurance. In 2006, the commercial for Nationwide aired during the Super Bowl and was the most viewed commercial for the game, garnering over 1 million views within two weeks. Other endorsements included Wickes Furniture, Ames Hardware, Old Spice, and the American Cancer Society.

On July 26, 2011, Old Spice launched a campaign on YouTube in which Lanzoni challenges Isaiah Mustafa to try to replace him as the New Old Spice Guy. The online challenge was entitled Mano a Mano in el Baño (hand-to-hand in the bathroom). Mustafa emerged as the winner, though Lanzoni's Old Spice YouTube Channel received more than 9 million views in the week after its debut, rising to Number 4 on YouTube for the week.

Once a spokesman for the American Cancer Society, Lanzoni has spoken for the controversial Burzynski Clinic, where his sister was receiving treatment for ovarian cancer. In April 2013, Lanzoni stated in an interview that "[Stanislaw Burzynski] is a genius. He definitely, I believe, he has the cure for cancer... They have to let him get his office back and let him do his work..." Lanzoni's younger sister died in August 2013.

=== Business ventures ===
In 2003, Lanzoni launched a clothing line at the Sam's Club division of Walmart. The line was casual wear for women. Prior to his clothing line, he wrote a fitness book and created a work-out video called Fabio Fitness. In 2008, he launched Healthy Planet Vitamins, a company selling whey protein, glutamine, and colostrum products.

In 2021, he launched a hair and skincare line for men titled Aston James, with the help of two Australian entrepreneurs. The company's mission is to "bring the experience of buying a Rolex to the men's personal care space." Lanzoni has stated the company name Aston James is a portmanteau of Aston Martin and James Bond.

=== Goose incident ===
On March 30, 1999, an event occurred that became popularly known as Lanzoni's "goose incident." During a promotional event, Lanzoni was seated in the front row for the inaugural ride of the Apollo's Chariot roller coaster at Busch Gardens Williamsburg. He was accompanied by more than 30 women dressed as Greek goddesses. Once the ride had accelerated to 73 miles per hour, Lanzoni claims a flock of hundreds of geese flew by and one of the geese was sucked into the ride. The goose died, and Lanzoni disembarked from the ride with blood on his face. Multiple reporters alleged that Lanzoni was hit in the face by a goose. The only video that exists was filmed from the ride entrance. There was an on-ride camera, but Lanzoni claims the camera was never found. Lanzoni's injury required a lot of stitches on his nose. Some sources claim the incident represented a paradigm shift in Lanzoni's career. On The Morning Show in 2021, Lanzoni clarified the situation:

Actually, the bird hit the camera, and a piece of the metal of the camera flew and cut the bridge of [my] nose. And that was a miracle. But... they were afraid of me suing Budweiser, and so they blamed it on a bird. But actually, the bird hit the camera. The bird never hit my face... I was very fortunate, very lucky because I needed one stitch.

== Personal life ==
Lanzoni was in a relationship with an unidentified woman from 1989 to 1993.

In a 1993 People interview, Lanzoni condemned the idea of plastic surgery and said, "I'm gonna keep developing something inside. That way, when I'm 60, I'm not gonna be one of those people who try all the plastic surgery and be ridiculous. I'm gonna say, 'I expressed myself. And now I'm a happy man.'"

In 2015, Lanzoni said that he visits the gym for one hour of aerobics and weight training at least four times a week. He also jogs, hikes, and takes part in motocross enduro. Lanzoni is known for his strict diet. He abstains from smoking and avoids consuming alcohol, caffeine, soy, cheese most of the time, salt, sweets, and recreational drugs. He also reduces exposure to the sun. He has stated that a person should treat their body "like a Lamborghini". He said in a 2016 Sports Illustrated interview, "In the morning I get up, I have my oatmeal, I have, always, an egg whites omelet, sometimes with spinach, sometimes with asparagus, sometimes with tomatoes or mushrooms. I cook it with I Can't Believe It's Not Butter. I always do. I've been using it for 20 years. For lunch, I normally have cod or sea bass or salmon with some vegetables. And at night, the same, usually fish with vegetables." He favors Japanese cuisine, particularly sushi, but has praised his native Italian cuisine and called it "among the best-loved [and] most nutritious in the world". He also consumes whey protein.

As of 2015, Lanzoni owns about 325 motorbikes; when The Washington Post asked him why he collected so many, he responded, "There's 365 days in a year." When asked how people could be more romantic in their everyday lives by Sports Illustrated in 2016, he replied, "Just be yourself. Just be the best of yourself."

Lanzoni became an American citizen in 2016. In 2021, Lanzoni said he was retired and hoping to marry and have children. He also said he sleeps in a hyperbaric chamber because he believes it reverses aging. He described his potential partner to People as "someone with a beautiful soul [and] great sense of humor [...] a woman that can do sports and can be a little bit tomboy".

== Filmography ==
=== Film ===
Year	Title	Role	Notes
1990	The Exorcist III	Angel	Uncredited
1991	Scenes from a Mall	Handsome Man	
1991	The Hard Way	Bar Patron / Bouncer	Uncredited
1992	Death Becomes Her	Lisle's Bodyguard	
1996	Eddie	Himself	Cameo
1996	Spy Hard	Himself	Cameo
2000	Dude, Where's My Car?	Himself	Cameo
2001	Zoolander	Himself	Cameo
2001	Bubble Boy	Gil / Cult Leader	Cameo
2011	Hollywood Sex Wars	Himself	Cameo
2014	Dumbbells	Himself	
2015	Knight of Cups	Himself	
2017	Sharknado 5: Global Swarming	The Pope	

=== Television ===
Year	Title	Role	Notes
1993	Acapulco H.E.A.T.	Claudio / Hotel Owner	
1993	Roseanne	Himself	Episode: "Guilt by Imagination" (Season 6, Ep. 8)
1995	Bobby's World	Himself (voice)	Cameo; Episode: "Hooked on Caps" (Season 6, Ep. 3)
1995	Eek! The Cat	Himself (voice)	2 episodes
1998	Late Night with Conan O'Brien	Himself	Episode: "Fabio/Vicki Lewis/Deftones" (Season 5, Ep. 128)
1997	Step by Step	Himself	Episode: "Absolutely Fabio" (Season 6, Ep. 11)
1997	The Weird Al Show	Himself	Episode: "Al Plays Hooky" (Season 1, Ep. 9)
2002	The Bold and the Beautiful	Himself	Guest role; 2002, 2003, 2012
2003	High Chaparall	Himself	One episode
2003	Yes, Dear	Himself	One episode
2005	Mr. Romance	Himself	
2006
2006	Bo! In the USA	Himself	2 episodes
2006	America's Next Top Model	Himself	One episode
2007	Ned's Declassified School Survival Guide	Himself	Episode: "Positives and Negatives"
2009	Rob Dyrdek's Fantasy Factory	Himself	One episode
2010	Big Time Rush	Himself	3 episodes
2010	The Suite Life on Deck	Captain Hawk	Episode: "Senior Ditch Day"
2010	Keith Lemon's World Tour	Himself	One episode
2011	Cupcake Wars	Himself	One episode
2012	Rob Dyrdek's Fantasy Factory	Himself / Fabulous Fabio	One episode
2013	Lemon La Vida Loca	Himself	One episode
2014	Almost Royal	Himself	One episode
2014	The Birthday Boys	Edmund	Sketch: "The Wrong Sperm"
2020	Robot Chicken	Himself (voice)	Episode: "Endgame"

=== Music videos ===
Year	Title	Artist	Role
1995	"I Kissed a Girl"	Jill Sobule	Himself
2019	"Miss You In My Sheets"	Trisha Paytas	Himself
