= Romance novel =

Literary genre

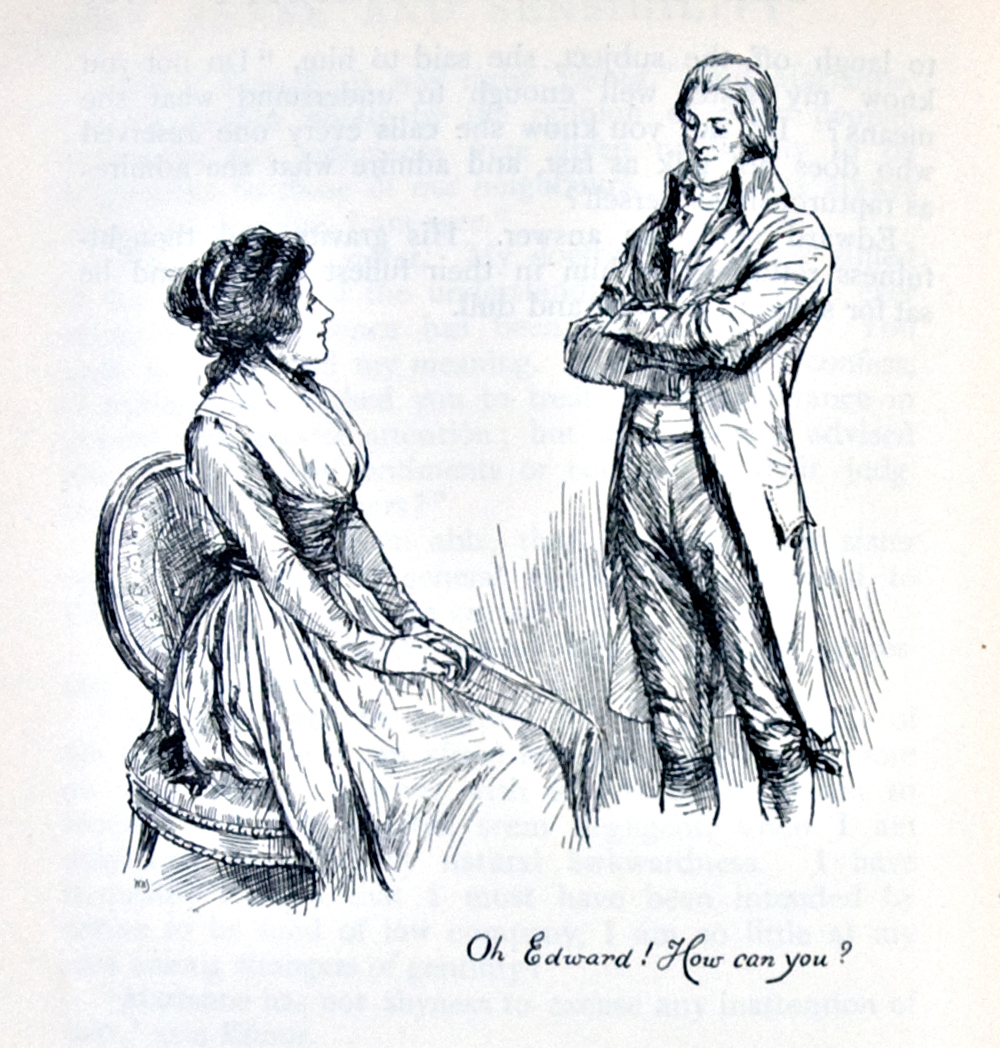
"Oh Edward! How can you?", a late-19th-century illustration from Sense and Sensibility (1811) by Jane Austen, a pioneer of the genre

Romance, or romance fiction, is the genre of narrative fiction whose works focus on the budding emotional, sexual, and loving relationship between two or more characters, often concluding with an emotionally satisfying or optimistic ending. Traditionally its most common format is the romance novel.

Romance novels encompass numerous subgenres. While women have traditionally been considered the primary readers of romance novels, a 2017 study commissioned by the Romance Writers of America found that men accounted for 18% of romance book buyers

The genre of works retroactively referred to as "romance novels" existed as far back as Greece in the Roman era. Precursors can also be found in the literary fiction of the 18th and 19th centuries, including Samuel Richardson's sentimental novel Pamela, or Virtue Rewarded (1740) and the novels of Jane Austen. Austen inspired Georgette Heyer, the British author of historical romance set around Austen's lifetime, as well as detective fiction. Heyer's first romance novel, The Black Moth (1921), was set in 1751.

The British Publisher, Mills & Boon, shifted focus towards romance fiction during the 1930s. Beginning in 1957, its novels were distributed in North America by Harlequin Enterprises, which expanded reader access through their direct marketing and mass market retail distribution.

An early American example of a mass-market romance was Kathleen E. Woodiwiss' The Flame and the Flower (1972), published by Avon Books. This was the first single-title romance novel to be published as an original paperback in the US. In the United Kingdom, Georgette Heyer's novels played a significant role in the development of historical romance. Some later editions have been revised to remove or alter certain stereotypes.

Strong sales of popular romance novels have contributed to the genre becoming one of the largest segments of the global book market. Although romance fiction was popular beforehand, the market experienced significant growth during the 1970s, with the addition of more subcategories and an increased number of single-title romances, but authors started pushing the boundaries of genre and plot, as well as creating more contemporary characters.

== Definition ==
Women will pick up a romance novel knowing what to expect, and this foreknowledge of the reader is very important. When the hero and heroine meet and fall in love, maybe they don't know they're in love but the reader does. Then a conflict will draw them apart, but you know in the end they'll be back together, and preferably married or planning to be by page 192.

— Joan Schulhafer of Pocket Books, 1982

According to the Romance Writers of America, the main plot of a mass-market romance novel must revolve about the two people as they develop romantic love for each other and work to build a relationship. Both the conflict and the climax of the novel should be directly related to that core theme of developing a romantic relationship, although the novel can also contain subplots that do not specifically relate to the main characters' romantic love. Furthermore, a romance novel must have an "emotionally satisfying and optimistic ending."

Leslie Gelbman, a president of Berkley Books, defines the genre as stating that romance must make the "romantic relationship between the hero and the heroine ... the core of the book." In general, romance novels reward characters who are good people and penalize those who are evil, and a couple who fights for and believes in their relationship will likely be rewarded with unconditional love. Bestselling author Nora Roberts states the romance genre in books "are about the celebration of falling in love and emotion and commitment, and all of those things we really want."

While the majority of romance novels meet the stricter criteria, there are also many books widely considered to be romance novels that deviate from these rules. The Romance Writers of America's definition of romance novels includes only the focus on a developing romantic relationship and an optimistic ending. Escapism is important; an Avon executive observed that "The phone never rings, the baby never cries and the rent's never overdue in romances." There are many publishers, libraries, bookstores, and literary critics who continue to go by the traditional definition of romance to categorize books.

There is a lot of controversy among romance authors about what should and should not be included in plots of romance novels. Some romance novel authors and readers believe the genre has additional restrictions, from plot considerations (such as the protagonists' meeting early on in the story), to avoiding themes (such as adultery). Other disagreements have centered on the firm requirement for a happy ending; some readers admit stories without a happy ending, if the focus of the story is on the romantic love between the two main characters (for example, Romeo and Juliet).

A romance novel can be set in any time period and in any location. In recent years, romance novels have even expanded into the galaxy. There are no specific restrictions on what can or cannot be included in a romance novel. Even controversial subjects are addressed in romance novels, including topics such as date rape, domestic violence, addiction, and disability. The combination of time frame, location, and plot elements does, however, help a novel to fit into one of several romance subgenres. Despite the numerous possibilities this framework allows, the press claimed that "all [romance novels] seem to read alike." Stereotypes of the romance genre abound. For instance, some believe that all romance novels are similar to those of Danielle Steel, featuring rich, glamorous people traveling to exotic locations. Many romance readers disagree that Steel writes romance at all, considering her novels more mainstream fiction.

Mass-market or formulaic romance novels are sometimes referred to as "smut" or female pornography, and are the most popular form of modern erotica for women. While some romance novels do contain more erotic acts, in other romance novels the characters do no more than kiss chastely. The romance genre runs the spectrum between these two extremes. Because women buy 90% of all romance novels, most romance novels are told from a woman's viewpoint, in either first or third person.

Although most romance novels are about heterosexual pairings, there are romance novels that deal with same-sex relationships, and some participants in the book industry characterize books dealing with same-sex relationships as F/F, and M/M.

While most romance novels end in happiness many famous literary fiction romance novels end tragically. Examples include: Wuthering Heights by Emily Brontë, Anna Karenina by Leo Tolstoy, The Thorn Birds by Colleen McCullough, Norwegian Wood by Haruki Murakami, Atonement by Ian McEwan, and The Song of Achilles by Madeline Miller.

== History ==
=== Development ===
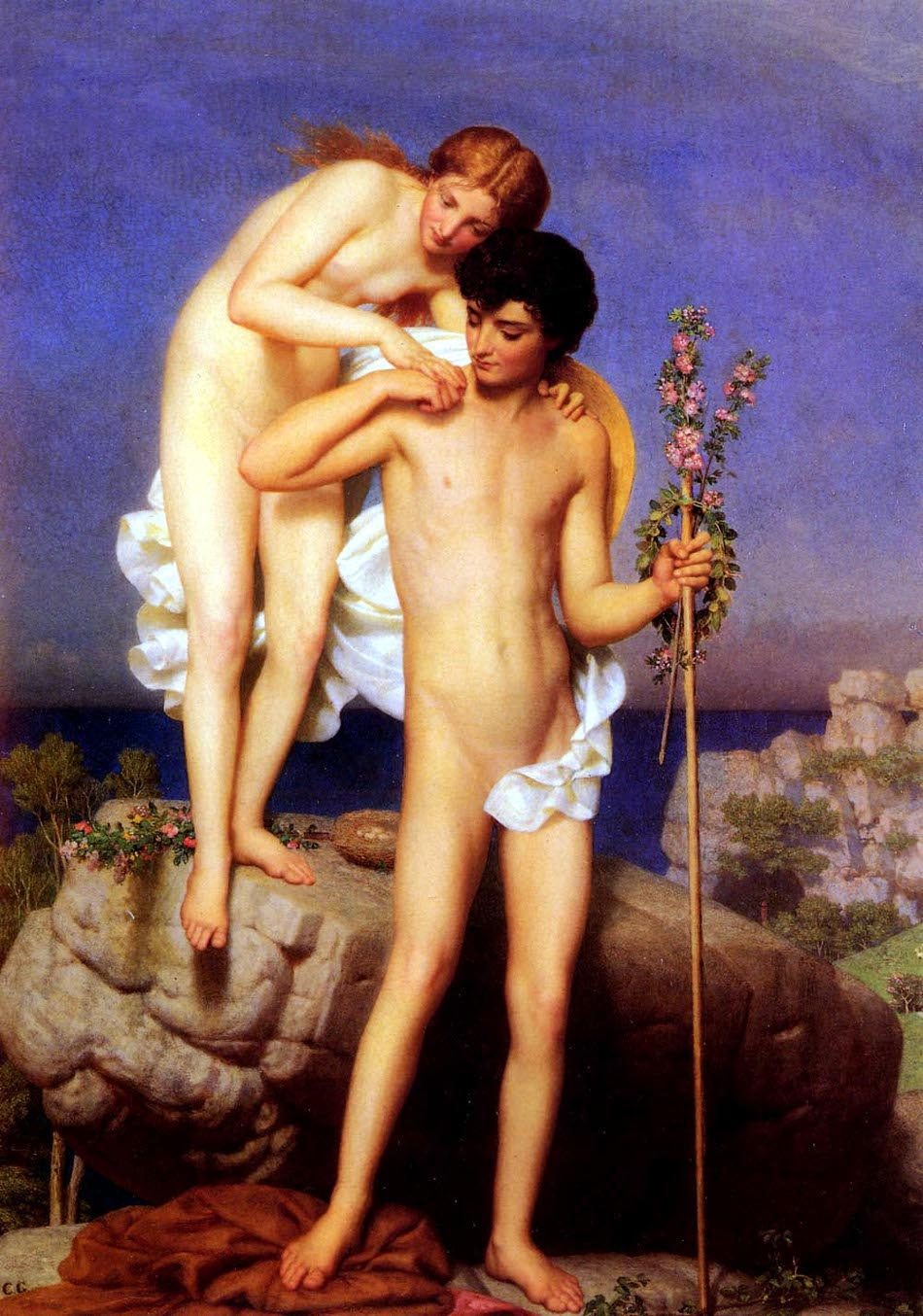
A nineteenth-century painting by the Swiss-French painter Marc Gabriel Charles Gleyre depicting a scene from Longus's Daphnis and Chloe

The genre of works of extended prose fiction dealing with romantic love existed in classical Greece. The titles of over twenty such ancient Greek romance novels are known, but most of them have only survived in an incomplete, fragmentary form. Only five ancient Greek romance novels have survived to the present day in a state of near-completion: Chareas and Callirhoe, Leucippe and Clitophon, Daphnis and Chloe, The Ephesian Tale, and The Ethiopian Tale.

Precursors of the modern popular love-romance can also be found in the sentimental novel Pamela, or Virtue Rewarded, by Samuel Richardson, published in 1740. Pamela was the first popular novel to be based on a courtship as told from the perspective of the heroine. Unlike many of the novels of the time, Pamela had a happy ending, when after Mr. B attempts unsuccessfully to seduce and rape Pamela multiple times, he eventually rewards her virtue by sincerely proposing an equitable marriage to her. The book was one of the first bestsellers, with five editions printed in the first eleven months of release. Richardson began writing Pamela as a book of letter templates. Richardson accepted the request, but only if the letters had a moral purpose. As Richardson was writing the series of letters turned into a story. Writing in a new form, the novel, Richardson attempted to both instruct and entertain. Richardson wrote Pamela as a conduct book, a sort of manual which codified social and domestic behavior of men, women, and servants, as well as a narrative in order to provide a more morally concerned literature option for young audiences.

The Romance novelist, Maria Edgeworth, influenced Victorian era motifs and authors with many of her works including Belinda (1801) and Helen (1834). An admirer of Edgeworth, Jane Austen, further influenced the Romance genre and Victorian era with her novel Pride and Prejudice (1813), which was called "the best romance novel ever written." In the early part of the Victorian era, the Brontë sisters, like Edgeworth and Austen, wrote literary fiction that influenced later popular fiction. While Maria Edgeworth introduced the orphaned heroine archetype in her Romantic works Belinda (1801) and Helen (1834), Charlotte Brontë later adapted the archetype for the Victorian audience in Jane Eyre (1847). Brontë's romance incorporates elements of both the gothic novel and Elizabethan drama, and "demonstrate[s] the flexibility of the romance novel form."

While the literary fiction romance continued to develop in the 20th century, the new subgenre of genre fiction started to become more popular after the First World War. In 1919, E. M. Hull's novel The Sheik was published in the United Kingdom. The protagonist of this book was termed an "alpha male" who kidnapped the heroine and won her admiration through his forceful rape. The novel was one of the first modern works to introduce the "bodice ripper" concept that focused primarily on rape fantasy, a theme explored in Samuel Richardson's Pamela (1740). Although women were gaining more independence in life, publishers believed that readers would only accept premarital sex in the context of rape, as was customary practice up until challenged during the women's rights movement. In this novel and those that followed, the rape was presented as societally acceptable by the author and depicted as more of a projected personal fantasy; the heroine is rarely if ever shown experiencing terror, stress, or trauma as a result because the author did not assume women had independent thought or rights to consider.

The mass market version of the historical romance, which Walter Scott developed in the early 19th century, is seen as beginning in 1921, when Georgette Heyer published The Black Moth. This is set in 1751, but many of Heyer's novels were inspired by Jane Austen's novels and are set around the time Austen lived, in the later Regency period. Because Heyer's romances are set more than 100 years earlier, she includes carefully researched historical detail to help her readers understand the period. Unlike other popular love-romance novels of the time, Heyer's novels used the setting as a major plot device. Her characters often exhibit twentieth-century sensibilities, and more conventional characters in the novels point out the heroine's eccentricities, such as wanting to marry for love. Heyer was a prolific author, and wrote one to two historical romance novels per year until her death in 1974.

=== Chinese vernacular romance novels ===
Pages of the novel Huatu yuan (translated into English as A Destiny in Two Paintings), collection of the Harvard-Yenching Library

During the Ming and Qing dynasties in China, there was a mass circulation and flourishment of a type of printed romantic novels called caizi jiaren ("scholar and beauty"), which typically involves a love story between a beautiful and talented maiden and a handsome young scholar. Some examples of these novels include Ping Shan Leng Yan, Haoqiu zhuan, Iu-Kiao-Li, Huatu yuan, Qiao Lian Zhu, Wu Mei Yuan, Bai Gui Zhi, Jin Yun Qiao, Ting Yue Lou, Wu Jiang Xue, Lin er bao, Ying Yun meng, Tiehua xianshi, Shuishi yuan, Jinxiang ting, Erdu mei quanzhuan, Dingqing ren, Qingmeng tuo and Zhuchun yuan. They feature themes influenced by the romantic Tang dynasty chuanqi fictions such as Yingying's Biography, The Tale of Li Wa and Huo Xiaoyu zhuan, as well as the popular works of Song and Yuan playwrights such as Bai Renfu, Zheng Guangzu and Wang Shifu.These novels reached their peak of popularity in the late Ming and early Qing periods, during the 17th century, when a myriad of novels of this type were sold and distributed.

The overwhelming prevalence of this type of romance novels was famously mocked in Cao Xueqin's The Dream of the Red Chamber, where it ridicules: "There are thousands of such "caizi jiaren" ["scholar and beauty"] books, and yet they are all alike!" Moreover, these Chinese romance novels would also go on to have an enduring influence on both Eastern and Western literatures.

=== Rise of the category romance ===
In the 1930s, the British publishers Mills & Boon began releasing hardback romance novels. The books were sold through weekly two-penny libraries and were known as "the books in brown" for their brown binding. In the 1950s, the company began offering the books for sale through newsagents across the United Kingdom.

A Canadian company, Harlequin Enterprises, began distributing in North America in 1957 the category romances published by Mills & Boon. Mary Bonneycastle, wife of Harlequin founder Richard Bonneycastle, and her daughter, Judy Burgess, exercised editorial control over which Mills & Boon novels Harlequin reprinted. They had a "decency code", and rejected more sexually explicit material that Mills and Boon submitted for reprinting. Realizing that the genre was popular, Richard Bonneycastle finally decided to read a romance novel. He chose one of the more explicit novels and enjoyed it. On his orders, the company conducted a market test with the novel he had read and discovered that it outsold a similar, tamer novel. Overall, the novels were short and formulaic, featuring heroines who were sweet, compassionate, pure and innocent. The few heroines who worked did so in traditional female jobs, including as nurses, governesses and secretaries. Intimacy in the novels never extended beyond a chaste kiss between the protagonists.

On October 1, 1971, Harlequin purchased Mills & Boon. By this point, the romance novel genre "had been popularized and distributed widely to an enthusiastic audience" in Great Britain. In an attempt to duplicate Mills & Boon's success in North America, Harlequin improved their distribution and marketing system. By choosing to sell their books "where the women are," they allowed many mass-market merchandisers and even supermarkets to sell the books, all of which were exactly 192 pages. Harlequin then began a reader service, selling directly to readers who agreed to purchase a certain number of books each month.

=== Bodice Rippers in American romance fiction ===
American literature adopted bodice rippers, rape fantasy, questionable consent, age-gap, underage women, lurid adultery, and force as a response to waning competition as a direct result of media censorship laws seen in similar industries including comic books considered lewd by the Comics Code Authority Aside from its content bringing its primarily comic book audience to paperback, rather than being first published in hardcover like the category romances, were distributed in drug stores and other mass-market merchandising outlets. Avon followed its release with the 1974 publication of Woodiwiss' second novel, The Wolf and the Dove and two more sexually graphic novels by newcomer Rosemary Rogers, Sweet Savage Love and Dark Fires. The latter sold two million copies in its first three months of release. By 1975, Publishers Weekly had reported that the "Avon originals" had sold a combined 8 million copies. The following year over 150 historical romance novels, many of them paperback originals, were published, selling over 40 million copies.

The success of these novels prompted a new style of writing romance, concentrating primarily on historical fiction tracking the monogamous relationship between a helpless heroine and the hero who rescued her, even if he had been the one to place her in danger. The covers of these novels tended to feature scantily clad women being grabbed by the hero, and caused the novels to be referred to as "bodice rippers". Cover arts of this style are referred to as clinch covers. A Wall Street Journal article in 1980 referred to these bodice rippers as "publishing's answer to the Big Mac: They are juicy, cheap, predictable, and devoured in stupefying quantities by legions of loyal fans." The term bodice ripper was considered divisive to some in the romance industry with more conservative morals.

In this new style of historical romance, usually written by men under female pseudonyms including Jennifer Wilde, underage heroines were independent and strong-willed and were often paired with heroes who evolved into caring and compassionate men who truly admired the women they loved. This was in contrast to the contemporary romances published during this time, which were often characterized by weak females who fell in love with overbearing alpha males. Although these heroines had active roles in the plot, they were "passive in relationships with the heroes." Across the genre, heroines during this time were usually aged 16–21, with the heroes slightly older, usually around 30. The women were virgins, while the men were not, and both members of the couple were described as beautiful.

=== Category romance adapts ===
Category romance lines were slower to react to some of the changes that had swept the historical romance subgenre. Despite the fact that the former Mills & Boon lines were now owned by a North American company, the lines did not have any American writers until 1975, when Harlequin purchased a novel by Janet Dailey. Dailey's novels provided the romance genre's "first look at heroines, heroes and courtships that take place in America, with American sensibilities, assumptions, history, and most of all, settings." Harlequin was unsure how the market would react to this new type of romance, and was unwilling to fully embrace it. In the late 1970s, a Harlequin editor rejected a manuscript by Nora Roberts, who has since become the top-selling romance author, because "they already had their American writer."

Harlequin sold almost $70 million of its paperback romances in 1979 through 100,000 supermarkets and other stores, giving the company almost 10% of the market for paperback books. That year the company began distributing its own books in the United States instead of through Simon & Schuster's Pocket Books. In 1980 Simon & Schuster formed Silhouette Books to publish its own romance novels, beginning what The New York Times called "perhaps the most bitter war in American book publishing history." The company sought to take advantage of the untapped talent of the American writers. They published several lines of category romance, and encouraged their writers to create stronger heroines and less dominant heroes. Silhouette soon saw their market share expand, and in 1984, Harlequin acquired them. Despite the acquisition, Silhouette continued to retain editorial control and to publish various lines under their own imprint.

Harlequin had also failed to adapt quickly to the signs that readers appreciated novels with more explicit sex scenes. In 1980, several publishers entered the category romance market to fill that gap. That year, Dell launched their Candlelight Ecstasy line with Amii Lorin's The Tawny Gold Man, becoming the first line to waive the requirement that heroines be virgins. By the end of 1983 sales for the Candlelight Ecstasy line totaled $30 million. Silhouette also launched similar lines, Desire (sexually explicit) and Special Edition (sexually explicit and longer stories, up to 250 pages), each of which had a 90–100% sellout rate each month.

A 1982 survey of romance readers confirmed that the new styles of writing were attracting new readers to the genre. 35% of the readers surveyed had begun reading romances after 1977. An additional 31% of those surveyed had been readers for between 6 and 10 years, meaning they had become interested in the genre after 1972, when Woodiwiss' novel ,The Flame and the Flower, was published. This means that two-thirds of those surveyed joined the genre after it had begun to change.

The number of category romance lines increased at a rapid pace, and by 1985 there were 16 separate lines producing a total of 80 novels per month. The sudden increase in category romance lines meant an equally sudden increase in demand for writers of the new style of romance novel. This tight market caused a proportionate decrease in the quality of the novels that were being released. By 1984, the market was saturated with category lines and readers had begun to complain of redundancy in plots. The following year, the "dampening effect of the high level of redundancy associated with series romances was evident in the decreased number of titles being read per month." Harlequin's return rate, which had been less than 25% in 1978, when it was the primary provider of category romance, swelled to 60%.

=== Further change ===
The genre continued to expand in the mid-to-late 1980s, as publishers realized that the more popular authors were often those who stretched the boundaries of the genre. A 1984 novel by LaVyrle Spencer featured an overweight, middle-aged hero who had to make drastic changes to his lifestyle to win the heroine, while a 1987 Dailey novel involved an ugly hero and a heroine who was searching for her birth mother. Jayne Ann Krentz's 1986 novel Sweet Starfire became the first futuristic romance, combining elements of traditional romance novels and science fiction. The relationships had also modernized: by the 1990s, it was rare to see a book that featured a man raping his future wife. In the mid-to-late 1980s, contemporary romances began to feature women in more male-dominated jobs, such as offshore oil rigs and the space program. The age range of heroines also began to expand, so that books began to feature women who had already reached 30 and even 40. Heroes also changed, with some authors veering towards a more sensitive man. Despite the broadening of some aspects of the plot, other taboos remained, and publishers discouraged authors from writing about controversial subjects such as terrorism, warfare, and masculine sports. Romance novels began to contain more humor beginning in the 1990s, as Julie Garwood began introducing a great deal of humor into her historical romances.

The romance novel began to expand in other ways as well. In 1989, author Jude Deveraux became the first romance author to transition from writing original mass market paperbacks to being published in hardcover. Her novel, A Knight in Shining Armor, "became a natural bestseller." Several authors found success writing single-title romances set in contemporary times, and publishing houses began to encourage the growth in the genre. Because the novels were set in modern times, they could include more of the elements that modern women could relate to, and soon began to touch on themes such as single parenthood, adoption, and abuse.

The 21st century brought additional changes to the genre that included diversifying main characters and plots to incorporate identities that had not previously been represented.

Scholars of romance novel history have observed that characters with disabilities have been largely underrepresented in mainstream media, including romance novels. By the early 2000s, though, more books in the romance genre featured heroes and heroines with physical and mental impairments. Mary Balogh's Simply Love, published in 2006, features a hero with facial scarring and nerve damage who overcomes fears of rejection due to his physical appearance to enter a romantic relationship and family unit by the end of the novel. This was a substantial shift from past narratives where disabled characters were "de-eroticized" and not given storylines that included sex or romantic love.

Additionally, autistic characters have gained more representation in the romance genre since the turn of the century. The year 2010 saw Christine Feehan's novel, Water Bound, featuring a heroine with autism as a significant plot point including a detailed and compassionate portrayal of living and coping with autism. Later on, Helen Hoang's 2018 novel The Kiss Quotient focuses on the heroine's Asperger's syndrome. However, it is still rare to find romance novels in which there are characters with cognitive disabilities, and they are most likely to be included as secondary characters.

Since the 1980s, many plot lines that were once thought to be taboo by the romance publishing industry have become much more accepted into the mainstream of romance fiction. For example, in the 20th century it was rare to find a book with a hero who was in the military or professional sports. In the 21st century, however, such characters are relatively common and even have their own sub-genres within the romance category.

In the earliest Harlequin romance novels, heroines were typically nurses and secretaries, but as time has passed and women have entered the workforce in larger numbers, romance heroines have spanned the career spectrum. Modern romance novels now feature more balanced relationships between men and women.

By 2000, the covers had begun to evolve from featuring a scantily clad couple to showing a view of the landscape featured in the novel.

== Critical reception ==
Some important literary figures received critical acclaim for their romance novels. For instance, the Nobel laureate Gabriel García Márquez received critical praise for his romance novel Love in the Time of Cholera.

Arthur Schopenhauer held that, if poets and novelists across continents have not stopped producing romance novels since millennia, it is because no other topic is more relevant and so the theme never gets old. According to Schopenhauer, romance/love is more important than other topics because it affects the species (not only the individual), in the sense that romance and partner choice is generally a prerequisite to have offspring and continue maintaining the human species in future generations of humankind.

Despite recent rehabilitation and merging of the genre with other genres, there is sometimes a negative stigma with the romance novel. As such, some dedicated readers are embarrassed to admit to buying or even reading the books. Some critics point to a lack of suspense, as it may seem obvious that the hero and heroine will eventually resolve their issues, and wonder whether it is beneficial "for women to be whiling away so many hours reading impossibly glamorized love stories." According to fiction author Melissa Pritchard, a romance novel "perpetuates something slightly dangerous, that there's this notion, that there's this perfect love out there, and it can distract you from the work of loving yourself."

Romance novelists attribute the stigma to the fact that romance is, according to some, a genre "written almost exclusively by women for women." Romance novelist Jennifer Crusie counters that in the modern romance novel "a woman is rewarded with unconditional love [only] if she remains true to herself," while novelist Susan Elizabeth Phillips believes that romance novels are popular because the heroine typically wins, sometimes overcoming great odds so that she is no longer a victim.

Peer-reviewed academic scholarship examining romance novels has increased enormously in the last few decades. Scholars are analysing the significance and impact of the genre, increasingly from a feminist, gender and equity studies perspective. The profile of the romance genre has also been raised by the financial and critical success of the adaptations of two successful series of novels: Outlander by Diana Gabaldon, and Bridgerton by Julia Quinn, by paid television network, STARZ and streaming service, Netflix. In 2022, it was announced that the best-selling "cult" Winston Brother series by self-published "smart-romance" author, Penny Reid, has been optioned for a television adaptation by Tomorrow Studios.

Debates about whether these novels fall inside or outside the contemporary romance genre, and the extent to which they transcend the genre to be multi-genre, has received mainstream media attention in part due to Gabaldon's frequent and prominent assertions that her Outlander series is not Romance Fiction. However, both scholarly analysis and the conversations between Gabaldon and her publisher about whether to market the books as romances, reveal that the discourse about genre labels is more nuanced.

== Formats ==
Romance novels are divided into two sub-sets, category romances, also known as series romances, and single title romances. Many authors write only within one of the formats, but others, including Jennifer Crusie and Jayne Ann Krentz, have achieved success in both formats.

=== Category romance ===
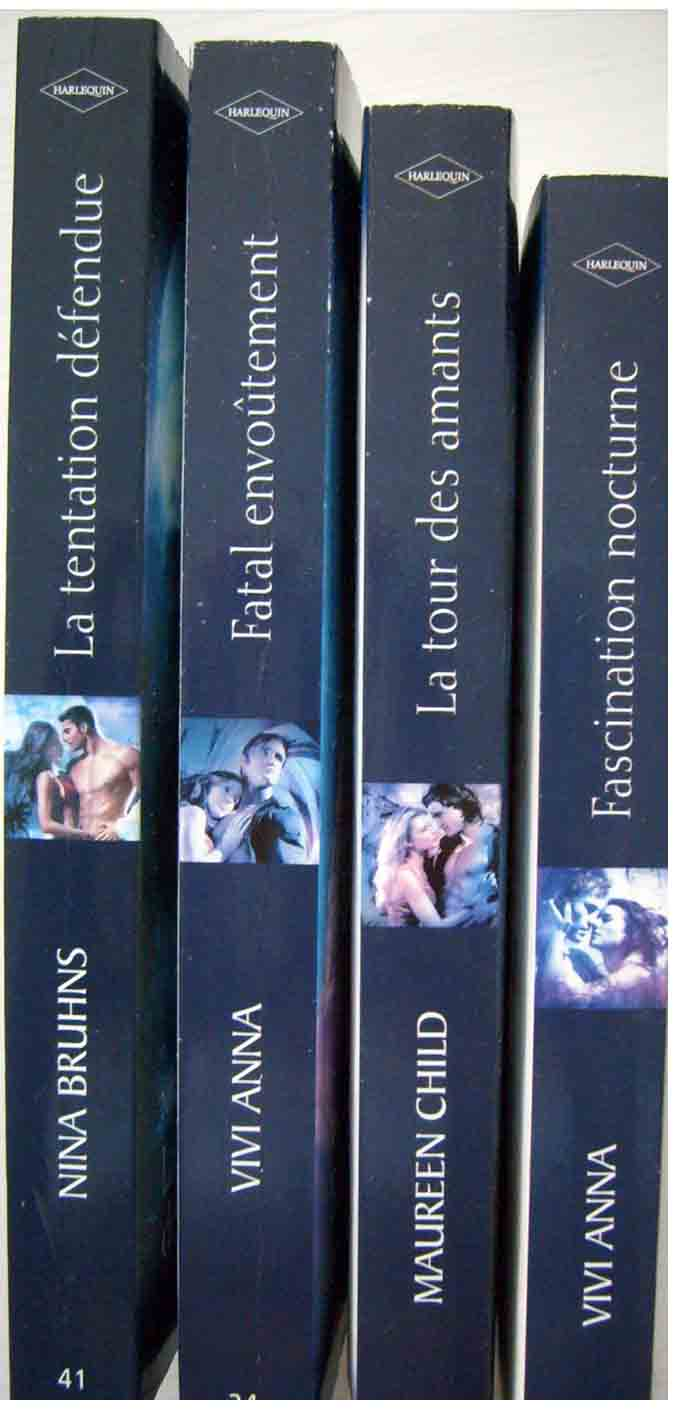
Harlequin novels

Category romances are short, usually no more than 200 pages, or about 55,000 words. The books are published in clearly delineated lines, with a certain number of books published in each line every month. In many cases, the books are numbered sequentially within the line. These novels have widespread distribution—often worldwide—and a single U.S. print run, remaining on a bookseller's shelves until they are sold out or until the next month's titles are released and take their place. Writers for the publisher of category romance, Harlequin/Mills & Boon, can find their novels translated into 26 languages and sold in over 100 international markets.

To write a successful novel of this length, the "author must pare the story down to its essentials. Subplots and minor characters are eliminated or relegated to the backstory." Nonetheless, category romance lines each have a distinct identity, which may involve similar settings, characters, time periods, levels of sensuality, or types of conflict. Publishers of category romances usually issue guidelines for each line, specifying the elements necessary for a novel to be included in each line. Depending on the current market and perceived reader preferences, publishers frequently begin new lines or end existing ones. Most recently, erotic and Christian lines have been introduced while traditional Regency romance lines have ended.

=== Single-title romances ===
Single-titles novels are romance novels not published as part of a publisher's category. They are longer than category romances, typically between 350 and 400 pages, or 100,000–110,000 words. Publishers may release the novels over a shorter period of time for sales and publicity reasons, but on average authors write 1.5 novels per year and have one each year published. Single-title novels remain on the booksellers' shelves at the discretion of the store.

Despite their name, single-title novels are not always stand alone novels. Some authors prefer to write several interconnected books, ranging in number from trilogies to long-running series, so that they can revisit characters or worlds. Such sets of books often have similar titles, and may be labelled as "Number 1 in the XXX Series", but they are not considered series romances because they are not part of a particular line.

== Subgenres ==
Subgenre popularity in the United States (2006)
Subgenre	% of market
Category romance	40%
Historical romance	17%
Contemporary romance	16%
Paranormal romance	9%
Romantic suspense	7%
Inspirational romance	6%
All others	5%

Because the definition of a romance novel does not limit the types of plot devices, time frames, or locations that can be included, the genre has grown to encompass a wide variety of material and spawned multiple subgenres. Subgenres of romance are often closely related to other literature genres, and some books could be considered a romance subgenre novel and another genre novel at the same time. For example, romantic suspense novels are often similar to mysteries, crime fiction and thrillers, and paranormal romances use elements popular in science fiction and fantasy novels.

=== Contemporary romance ===
Contemporary romance, which is set after World War II, is often what people mean when they refer to a romance novel. Contemporary romance novels—the largest subgenre—are set in the time when they are written, and usually reflect the mores of that time. Heroines in contemporary romances prior to 1970 usually quit working when they marry or have children—while heroines after 1970 usually have, and keep, a career. As contemporary romance novels have grown to contain more complex plotting and more realistic characters, the line between this subgenre and the genre of women's fiction has blurred.

Most contemporary romance novels contain elements that date the books. The majority of them eventually become irrelevant to more modern readers and go out of print. Those that survive the test of time, such as Jane Austen's work, are often reclassified as historical romances.

Over half of the romantic fiction published in the United States in 2004 (1,468 out of 2,285 books) were contemporary romance novels. Contemporary romance novels have twice been chosen by Kelly Ripa to be featured in her Reading with Ripa book club.

=== Historical romance ===
Historical romance, also known as historical novel, is a broad category of fiction which the plot takes place in a setting located in the past, which Walter Scott helped popularize in the early 19th century, with works such as Rob Roy and Ivanhoe.

This subgenre includes a wide variety of other subgenres, including Regency romance. Mass-market historical romance novels are rarely published in hardcover, with fewer than 15 receiving that status each year, less than one-fifth of the number of contemporary romance novels published in that format. Because historical romances are primarily published in mass-market format, their fortunes are tied to a certain extent to the mass-market trends. Booksellers and large merchandisers now sell fewer mass market paperbacks, preferring trade paperbacks or hardcovers, which prevents historical romances from being sold in some price clubs and other mass merchandise outlets.

In 2001, 778 mass-market historical romances were published, a 10-year high. By 2004, the annual number had dropped to 486, which was still 20% of all romance novels published. Kensington Books says they receive fewer submissions of historical novels, and their previously published authors have switched to contemporary.

=== Romantic suspense ===
Romantic suspense involves an intrigue or mystery for the protagonists to solve. Typically, however, the heroine is the victim of a crime or attempted crime, and works with a hero, who tends to be in a field where he would serve as a protector, such as a police officer, FBI agent, bodyguard, or Navy SEAL. By the end of the novel, the mystery is resolved and the interaction between the hero and heroine has evolved into a solid relationship. These novels primarily take place in contemporary times, but authors such as Amanda Quick have broadened the genre to also include historical timeframes.

Like all romances, romantic suspense novels must place the development of a relationship between the protagonists at the heart of the story. The relationship "must impact each decision they make and increase the tension of the suspense as it propel the story. In turn, the events of suspense must also directly affect the relationship and move the story forward." Romantic suspense novels tend to have more "clean" language, without the "emotional, intimate" descriptions often used in more traditional romances. Because the mystery is a crucial aspect of the plot, these novels are more plot-driven instead of character-driven.

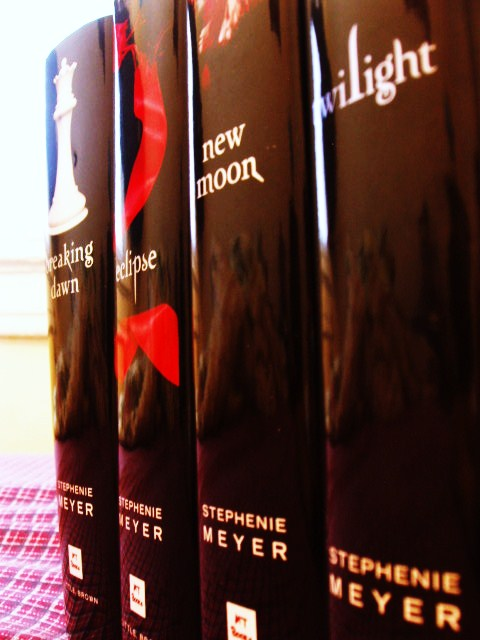
Paranormal Novels: The Twilight Saga

This blend of the romance and mystery was perfected by Mary Stewart, who wrote ten romantic suspense novels between 1955 and 1967. Stewart was one of the first to seamlessly combine the two genres, maintaining a full mystery while focusing on the courtship between two people. In her novels, the process of solving the mystery "helps to illuminate" the hero's personality, helping the heroine to fall in love with him.

=== Paranormal romance ===
Paranormal romance blends the real with the fantastic or science fictional. The fantastic elements may be woven into an alternate version of our own world in an urban fantasy involving vampires, werewolves, and/or demons, or they may be more "normal" manifestations of the paranormal—humans with psychic abilities, witches, or ghosts. Time travel, futuristic, and extraterrestrial romances also fall beneath the paranormal umbrella.

These novels often blend elements of other subgenres—including suspense, mystery, or chick lit—with their fantastic themes. A few paranormal romances are set solely in the past and are structured much like any historical romance novel. Others are set in the future, sometimes on different worlds. Still others have a time travel element with either the hero or the heroine traveling into the past or the future. Between 2002 and 2004, the number of paranormal romances published in the United States doubled to 170 per year. A popular title in the genre can sell over 500,000 copies.

Many paranormal romances rely on the blend of contemporary American life with the existence of supernatural or magically empowered beings, human or otherwise. Sometimes the larger culture is aware of the magical in its midst; sometimes it is not. Some paranormal romances focus less on the specifics of their alternate worlds than do traditional science fiction or fantasy novels, keeping the attention strongly on the underlying romance. Others develop the alternate reality meticulously, combining well-planned magical systems and inhuman cultures with contemporary reality.

=== Science fiction romance ===
Science fiction romance is "unique blend of three of the most popular genres: science fiction, fantasy, and romance." While exploring their alternate worlds, they also offer a fully developed romance. The sensuality level in these novels varies from chaste to very sexy.

Over the years, many publishers have included futuristic, fantasy, and science-fiction romances in their contemporary series lines (for example, Harlequin Temptation, Harlequin Superromance, Silhouette Special Edition). The first futuristic romance to be marketed by a mainstream romance publisher, Jayne Ann Krentz's Sweet Starfire, was published in 1986 and was a "classic road trip romance" that happened to be set in a separate galaxy. This genre has become more popular since 2000. Krentz attributes the popularity of this romance genre to the fact that the novels "are, at heart, classic historical romances that just happen to be set on other worlds."

Science fiction overlaps with other subgeres like steampunk which is science fiction mixed with alternate history which takes place during the Victorian era. It mixes historical elements with technology (for example, the television series The Wild Wild West (1965–1969)). Authors in this subgenre include M. K. Hobson and Gail Dayton.

=== Fantasy romance ===
Fantasy romance, also known as romantic fantasy, is a subgenre of fantasy fiction, describing a fantasy story using many of the elements and conventions of the romance genre. Romantic fantasy has been published by both fantasy and romance lines, with some publishers distinguishing between "fantasy romance" being more like a contemporary fantasy novel with romantic elements, and "romantic fantasy" with more emphasis on the romance elements of the story.

=== Time-travel romance ===
Time-travel romances are a version of the classic "fish out of water" story. In most, the heroine is from the present day and travels into the past to meet the hero. In a smaller subset of these novels, the hero, who lives in the past, travels forward into his future to meet the heroine. A successful time-travel romance must have the characters react logically to their experience and should investigate some of the differences, both physical and mental, between the world the character normally inhabits and the one where they landed. Some writers end their novels with the protagonists trapped in different time periods and unable to be together—to the displeasure of many readers of the genre.

=== Inspirational romance ===
Inspirational romance, as the market exists today, combines explicitly Christian themes with the development of a romantic relationship. In 2004, 167 novels were published in the inspirational romance subgenre. These novels typically do not include gratuitous violence or swearing, and the central courtship is chaste. Sex, if it is present at all, occurs after marriage and is not explicitly detailed. Many novels in this genre also focus on the hero or heroine's faith, turning the love story into "a triangle: the man and the woman and also their relationship with God." Themes such as forgiveness, honesty, and fidelity are common.

The first line of series inspirational romances debuted shortly after the 1980 U.S. presidential election, when Silhouette launched their Silhouette Inspirations line. The books were aimed at born-again Christians and were marketed in religious bookstores. The Silhouette Inspirations line was closed after Harlequin acquired Silhouette in 1984 because it was not profitable. However, other Christian publishers continued to produce romance novels, including historical and contemporary, and Harlequin later rejoined the market with the 1998 launch of its Steeple Hill and Love Inspired lines.

=== Young Adult romance ===
Young adult romance are romance novels where young adult life is centered. The subgenre is believed to have been started in 1942, with varying degrees of popularity throughout time. The romance between two characters is the central focus of the book, however other aspects of young adult/teen life are also explored, often with coming-of-age themes and navigating relationships. While most romance ends with "happily ever after," "happily for now" is generally accepted due to the age of characters.

Young adult romance has its own subgenres which include contemporary, fantasy, sci-fi, LGBTQIA+, and more.

=== LGBTQIA+ romance ===
LGBTQIA+ romance has been a fast-growing subgenre, especially with the rise of indie publishing and social media granting access to doors that are normally closed. Male/male romance leads the subgenre, but lesbian/sapphic, bisexual, transgender, genderqueer, and ace-spectrum (or asexual and aromantic) fiction are all featured prominently, with multiple small publishing houses leading the way. The romantic relationship is the central story, and focus is usually taken off of trauma.

=== Black romance ===
Black romance is a romance where both main characters and majority of supporting characters are black. The abolitionist and suffragist Frances E. W. Harper wrote what was arguably the first African American romance novel, Iola Leroy in 1892. The subgenre started growing in the early 1980s along with other romance subgenres. Black love historical romance novels center the love and happiness of its main characters, and usually includes black history and black people standing in solidarity. Political and social commentary is the norm, with a large majority of books expressing explicitly abolitionist and activist views. In contemporary black love, themes of activism are not as dominant, however normally are still included. Popular authors include Beverly Jenkins, Alyssa Cole, Rebecca Weatherspoon, Kennedy Ryan, and Christina C. Jones.

=== Multicultural romance ===
Multicultural romance typically features a hero and/or heroine who is African-American, although some multicultural lines also include Asian or Hispanic heroes or heroines or interracial relationships. The first line of multicultural romance novels, Arabesque, was launched by Kensington Books in 1994. BET Books purchased the line in 1998, and the number of new authors that they publish has continued to expand each year.

For example, in 1999, Kensington Publishing launched the first line of Latino romance novels – ENCANTO. The ENCANTO novels were originally released in two ways – a bilingual Spanish/English version and a Spanish-only version. Two novels were published every month until late 2001, when the line went into hiatus.

Although romance novels featuring African-Americans and Hispanic protagonists are becoming more popular, those featuring Asian or Asian-American characters are rare. Author Tess Gerritsen believes this is due to the fact that there are fewer Asian-American women who read romances: "We read romances because we want to feel good about love...in order to do that, the reader must identify with the heroine."

=== Erotic romance ===
Erotic romance is a blend of romance and erotica. Erotic romance novels are characterized by strong sexual content, but can contain elements of any of the other romance subgenres. Erotic romance novels tend to use straightforward language, avoiding many of the euphemisms used in books with milder content. These novels usually include more sex scenes, often focusing more on the sex act rather than being a traditional love scene, and may include unusual positions or acts. Despite a greater emphasis on the sex scenes, however, erotic romance is distinguishable from traditional pornography. Pornography concentrates on the sex acts, but erotic novels include well-developed characters and a plot that could exist without the sex acts. In a vast majority of erotic romance novels, the sexual act progresses the plot or furthers the character development in some way and are critical to the story.

Erotic romances' lengths run from short stories to single-title novels. Some of these are published as part of a category, such as Harlequin Blaze, while others are published as part of an anthology and are only novella length. Even single-title erotic romances may be as short as a novella, however.

Many of the publishers of erotic romance are either small press publishers or electronic book publishers. Writers often have more leeway as to what types of erotic acts can be included when working with an electronic publisher than they would have when working with a print publisher. The market for erotic romances has been growing rapidly, leading some publishers to create new lines for these types of books. Some subjects are still considered taboo, even with erotic romance. Themes such as pedophilia, incest, and bestiality are discouraged by all publishers.

=== Chick lit ===
Chick lit or chick literature is named after the readership it attracts (women in their twenties and thirties), and it is said to be inspired by the 1996 novel Bridget Jones's Diary. Some of the dominant themes of chick lit are a single woman's journey through career, high-powered work environment, personal life, relationships, motherhood, and parenting. Some subcategories of this genre are baby lit and mummy lit.

== Tropes ==
A trope is a common theme or plot device. Tropes are repeatedly used in romance novels; they are often a specific aspect of the story that readers seek out. Tropes, which relate to plot, are often confused or conflated with "hooks" which are character or setting elements that attract readers; that is, profession, location, season, character trait, etc.

According to India Holton, tropes may seen cliché, but they deeply connect to readers by reflecting on "universal experiences and archetypes". They give romance writers the opportunity to draw readers in by offering them something familiar. Tropes can be a starting point to innovate from and authors can intentionally subvert them to great effect. There are a myriad of tropes that can be found in romance novels but some of the most common are:

- Love corner: Two characters compete for a third's love.
- Friends to Lovers: Long time friends become romantically involved.
- Forced Proximity: Characters are forced to be around each other so much they can't help but fall for each other.
  - Arranged Marriage, another romance trope, is a subset of this trope.
- Enemies to Lovers: Characters who can't stand each other overcome their differences and fall in love.
- Forbidden Love: A relationship between the characters is frowned upon, explicitly off limits, or taboo but it happens anyway.
  - Workplace Romances and other hooks involving the status or relationship of the characters are often subsets of this trope.
- Second Chance: Characters who were once together but broke up then find their way back to each other.
- Fake Relationship: Characters enter into an agreed upon fake relationship which turns into the real thing.
- Soulmates: Characters are drawn together due to an inevitable, fated bond.

== Explicit content ==
The existence (or not) of sexual content and the nature of said content is important to readers of romance novels. This content is often referred to as “spice,” “steam,” or “heat” by readers, reviewers, and publishers. Explicit content is subjective and not only takes into consideration the amount of sexual content in a story but also the type of content and the level of description.

Some publishers or authors list content ratings for their books based on their own guidelines. It is somewhat controversial to see explicit content ratings in a library catalog. The American Library Association views labeling as a form of censorship and also feels that labeling explicit content implies that someone has screened all the books available in their catalog. However, some libraries will use tags for this content in their catalogs. These tags are primarily to aid library staff in providing reference help for patrons and can be more difficult (but not impossible) to locate for general users.

== Markets ==
=== North America ===
The romance fiction market "has been impervious to the overall economic recession, with faithful readers spending up to $40 a month" on romance novels in 1982. That year, paperback romances totaled $300 million in sales, and the total audience was estimated at 20 million readers. A survey of 600 regular romance readers the same year "found that they mirror the general population in age, education, and marital and socioeconomic status." Over half of the women had at least some college education, and 40% were employed full-time. 60% of the women surveyed read at least one romance every two days. The women admitted to reading romances as an antidote to stress, for mental escape, and to learn about history and new careers.

As of 1982 at least 25% of all paperbacks were romance novels; by 1991, they comprised 46% of all mass market paperbacks sold in the US. This expansion was due in part to voracious readers, with over half of Harlequin's customers purchasing 30 novels per month. By this time, the romance novel audience had become more educated, with 45% having a college degree, and more than half of the audience worked outside the home.

By the 2000s, romance had become the most popular genre in modern literature. In 2008, romantic fiction generated $1.37 billion in sales, with 7,311 romance novels published and making up 13.5% of the consumer book market. Over 74 million people claimed to have read at least one romance novel in 2008, according to a Romance Writers of America study. The study reported that 9.5% of romance readers identified themselves as male, and that romance readers were more likely to be married or living with a partner. According to the RWA 84% of romance buyers were women and 16% were men. Of the entire American population, 24.6% read at least one romance novel in 2008.

Founded in 2024, a company called 831 Stories began publishing covers without images or illustrations to create "a kind of IYKYK wink and nod between readers".

=== International markets ===
Along with cowboys and horses, the authors were told to skip ethnic heroes [for European readers] and not to let family members steal too much of the limelight. "But secret babies sell quite well, as do marriages of convenience, or arranged marriages and, of course, alpha heroes," Stoecker said.

— The New York Times, 2004

74.8 million people read an English-language romance novel in 2008. Harlequin sells more than 4 books per second, half of them internationally. Author Heather Graham attributes this to the fact that "emotions translate easily." In the United Kingdom, over 20% of all fiction books sold each year are romance novels.

Although romance novels are translated into over 90 languages, most authors of women's fiction are from Great Britain or North America. In France, where over 12 million romance novels are sold each year, all are translations, as are almost all Harlequin novels in Italy. Some publishing companies in Germany refuse to allow their romance authors to use their own names, fearing that readers will not buy a romance novel that does not have an American pseudonym.

The Anglo-Saxon perspective in the fiction at times can be much less successful in a European market. Although Italy is the strongest foreign market for the chick lit sold by single-title imprint Red Dress Ink, in that country romance readers do not care to read books about cowboys, as this type of occupation was not common in their culture. The paranormal romance genre is not popular in countries such as Poland and Russia, although historical romance tends to be very successful. Inspirational romance does not sell well in Europe, where romances that feature babies are very popular. German readers enjoy reading more erotic romance novels, and some German translations of English romance novels expand or insert love scenes into otherwise tame stories. The alternate scenario also occurs, as other German translators censor the love scenes.

As of 2014, romance is the most popular literary genre in Russia (chosen 13% of respondents), especially among the younger audience.

In 2004, sales of romance novels in Australia increased 28% over the year before. Between 1999 and 2004 there was an increase of 40–50% in the number of new titles released. Harlequin, which received 20,000 unsolicited manuscripts each year, found that women are 99% of romance readers.

== Awards ==
The most prestigious and notable awards for romance novels are the RITA Awards, which are presented annually by the Romance Writers of America to the best novels in romantic fiction.

Another notable award is the Romantic Novel of the Year Award (RoNA) through the Romantic Novelists' Association. The award is separated into categories:

- Contemporary Romance
- Historical Romance
- Romantic Comedy
- Fantasy Romance
- Romantic Thriller
- Romantic Saga
- Shorter Romantic Novel
- Debut Romance Novel

== See also ==
- Amish romance
- Charles Boon, co-founder of Mills & Boon publishing company
- List of romantic novelists
- Gerald Rusgrove Mills, co-founder of Mills & Boon publishing company
- Tania Modleski, academic and scholar of romance fiction
- Romance film
- Shakespearean comedy
- Sarah Wendell, writer and blogger about romance
