= List of works by Jayne Ann Krentz =

This is a list of works from American author Jayne Ann Krentz.

== Arcane Society Novels ==
Series is written across all three pseudonyms.

Order	Title	Date of first publication	Author	Sub-series	Notes
1	Second Sight	2006	Amanda Quick		
2	White Lies	2007	Jayne Ann Krentz		
3	Sizzle and Burn	2007	Jayne Ann Krentz		
4	The Third Circle	2008	Amanda Quick		
5	Running Hot	2008	Jayne Ann Krentz		
6	The Perfect Poison	2009	Amanda Quick		
7	Fired Up	2009	Jayne Ann Krentz	Dreamlight Trilogy 1	
8	Burning Lamp	2010	Amanda Quick	Dreamlight Trilogy 2	
9	Midnight Crystal	2010	Jayne Castle	Dreamlight Trilogy 3	
9.5	Scargill Cove Case Files	2011	Jayne Ann Krentz		e-novella
10	In Too Deep	2011	Jayne Ann Krentz	Looking Glass Trilogy 1	
11	Quicksilver	2011	Amanda Quick	Looking Glass Trilogy 2	
12	Canyons of the Night	2011	Jayne Castle	Looking Glass Trilogy 3	

== As Jayne Castle ==
Stand-alone novels
Title	Date of first publication	Series
Vintage of Surrender	1979	MacFadden Romance #132
Gentle Pirate	1979	Candlelight Ecstasy Romance #2
Queen of Hearts	1980	MacFadden Romance #157
Bargain with the Devil	1981	Candlelight Ecstasy Romance #26
Wagered Weekend	1981	Candlelight Ecstasy Romance #17
Right of Possession	1981	Candlelight Ecstasy Romance #23
A Man's Protection	1982	Candlelight Ecstasy Romance #36
Relentless Adversary	1982	Candlelight Ecstasy Romance #45
Affair of Risk	1982	Candlelight Ecstasy Romance #55
A Negotiated Surrender	1982	Candlelight Ecstasy Romance #68
Power Play	1982	Candlelight Ecstasy Romance #79
Spellbound	1982	Candlelight Ecstasy Romance #91
Conflict of Interest	1983	Candlelight Ecstasy Romance #130
Double Dealing	1984	
Trading Secrets	1985	

=== Guinevere Jones ===
1. The Desperate Game, 1986, reissued digitally and in audio August 2012
2. The Chilling Deception, 1986, reissued digitally and in audio August 2012
3. The Sinister Touch, 1986, reissued digitally and in audio August 2012
4. The Fatal Fortune, 1986, reissued digitally and in audio August 2012
- Desperate and Deceptive: The Guinevere Jones Collection Volume 1, 2014 (Collects The Desperate Game and The Chilling Deception)
- Sinister and Fatal: The Guinevere Jones Collection Volume 2, 2014 (Collects The Sinister Touch and The Fatal Fortune)

=== Curtain Worlds ===
==== St. Helen's ====
1. Amaryllis, 1996
2. Zinnia, 1997
3. Orchid, 1998

==== Harmony ====
1. Bridal Jitters (in Charmed (1999) and Harmony (2000))
2. After Dark, 2000 (in Harmony (2000) and No Going Back (2004))
3. After Glow, 2004
4. Ghost Hunter, 2006
5. Silver Master, 2007
6. Dark Light, 2008
7. Obsidian Prey, 2009
8. Midnight Crystal, 2010 (Book 3 of Arcane Society: The Dreamlight Trilogy)
9. Canyons of Night, 2011 (Book 3 of Arcane Society: The Looking Glass Trilogy)
10. The Lost Night, 2012
11. Deception Cove, 2013
12. The Hot Zone, 2014
13. Siren's Call, 2015
14. Illusion Town, 2016
15. Guild Boss, 2021
16. Sweetwater and the Witch, 2022
17. People in Glass Houses, 2024

== As Jayne Taylor ==
- Whirlwind Courtship, 1979

== As Jayne Bentley ==
Stand-alone novels
Title	Date of first publication	Series
A Moment Past Midnight	1980	MacFadden Romance #192
Turning Toward Home	1980	MacFadden Romance #224
Maiden of the Morning	1980	MacFadden Romance #249
Hired Husband	1981	MacFadden Romance #274
Sabrina's Scheme	1981	MacFadden Romance #283

== As Stephanie James ==
Most titles have been re-released under Jayne Ann Krentz in print or digital format.

Stand-alone novels
Title	Date of first publication	Series	Notes
A Passionate Business	1981	Silhouette Romance #89	
Corporate Affair	1982	Silhouette Desire #1	
Dangerous Magic	1982	Silhouette Special Edition #15	
Renaissance Man	1982	Silhouette Desire #25	
Reckless Passion	1982	Silhouette Desire #31	
Stormy Challenge	1982	Silhouette Special Edition #35	
Velvet Touch	1982	Silhouette Desire #11	
Lover in Pursuit	1982	Silhouette Desire #19	
Serpent in Paradise	1983	Silhouette Intimate Moments #9	Republished in 2013 under Jayne Ann Krentz
Raven's Prey	1983	Silhouette Intimate Moments #21	Republished in 2013 under Jayne Ann Krentz
Price of Surrender	1983	Silhouette Desire #37	
Affair of Honor	1983	Silhouette Desire #49	
To Tame the Hunter	1983	Silhouette Desire #55	
Gamemaster	1983	Silhouette Desire #67	
The Silver Snare	1983	Silhouette Desire #85	
Battle Prize	1983	Silhouette Desire #97	
Body Guard	1983	Silhouette Desire #103	
Gambler's Woman	1984	Silhouette Desire #115	
Night of the Magician	1984	Silhouette Desire #145	
Nightwalker	1984	Silhouette Desire #163	
Wizard	1985	Silhouette Desire #211	
Golden Goddess	1985	Silhouette Desire #235	
Cautious Lover	1986	Silhouette Desire #253	
Green Fire	1986	Silhouette Desire #277	
Second Wife	1986	Silhouette Desire #307	
Saxon's Lady	1987	Silhouette Desire	
The Challoner Bride	1987	Silhouette Desire #342	

Omnibus
Title	Date of first publication	Notes
Dangerous Affair	2004	Affair of Honor and Dangerous Magic
Wildest Dreams	2013	Renaissance Man and Velvet Touch
Reckless Nights	2013	Stormy Challenge and Reckless Passion
Ruthless Love	2014	Corporate Affair and Lover in Pursuit

=== Colter ===
1. Fabulous Beast, 1984
2. The Devil to Pay, 1985

== As Jayne Ann Krentz ==
Stand-alone novels
Title	Date of first publication	Series	Notes
Uneasy Alliance	1984	Harlequin Temptation #11	
Call It Destiny	1984	Harlequin Temptation #21	
Ghost of a Chance	1984	Harlequin Temptation #34	
Legacy	1985	Harlequin Intrigue #10	
Man With a Past	1985	Harlequin Temptation #45	
Witchcraft	1985	Harlequin Temptation #74	
The Waiting Game	1985	Harlequin Intrigue #17	
True Colors	1986	Harlequin Temptation #91	
Twist of Fate	1986		
The Ties That Bind	1986	Harlequin Temptation #109	
Between the Lines	1986	Harlequin Temptation #125	
The Family Way	1987	Harlequin Temptation #147	
The Main Attraction	1987	Harlequin Temptation #157	
Chance of a Lifetime	1987	Harlequin Temptation #168	
Test of Time	1987	Harlequin Temptation #177	
A Coral Kiss	1987		
Midnight Jewels	1987		
Full Bloom	1988	Harlequin Temptation #191	
Joy	1988	Harlequin Temptation #219	
A Woman's Touch	1989	Harlequin Temptation #241	
Lady's Choice	1989	Harlequin Temptation #270	
The Golden Chance	1990		
To Wild To Wed?	1991	Harlequin Temptation #341	
The Wedding Night	1991	Harlequin Temptation #365	
Silver Linings	1991		
Sweet Fortune	1991		
The Private Eye	1992	Harlequin Temptation #377	
Family Man	1992		
Perfect Partners	1992		
Hidden Talents	1993		
Wildest Hearts	1993		
Grand Passion	1994		Connecting Rooms in Everlasting Love (1995) and Hearts Desire (1998)
Trust Me	1995		
Absolutely, Positively	1996		
Deep Waters	1997		
Sharp Edges	1998		
Flash	1998		
Eye of the Beholder	1999		
Soft Focus	1999		
Lost & Found	2001		
Smoke in Mirrors	2002		
Falling Awake	2004		
All Night Long	2006		
River Road	2014		
Trust No One	2015		
Secret Sisters	2015		

Omnibus
Title	Year of first publication	Notes
No Going Back	2004	Soft Focus and After Dark by Jayne Castle

=== Lost Colony ===
1. Sweet Starfire, 1986
2. Crystal Flame, 1986
3. Shield's Lady, 1989 (originally published as Amanda Glass)

=== Dreams ===
1. Dream, Part One, 1988
2. Dream, Part Two, 1988
- Shared Dream, 1992 (Omnibus of Dream Part One and Dream Part Two)
- Dreams: Parts 1 and 2, 2013 (kindle re-release)

=== Gifts ===
1. Gift of Gold, 1988
2. Gift of Fire, 1989

=== Ladies and Legend ===
1. The Pirate, 1990
2. The Adventurer, 1990
3. The Cowboy, 1990

=== Eclipse Bay ===
1. Eclipse Bay, 2000
2. Dawn in Eclipse Bay, 2001
3. A Summer in Eclipse Bay, 2002
- Together in Eclipse Bay, 2003 (collects all three books)

=== Whispering Springs ===
1. Light in Shadow, 2002
2. Truth or Dare, 2003

=== Arcane Society ===
- White Lies (Book 2), 2007
- Sizzle and Burn (Book 3), 2008
- Running Hot (Book 5), 2008
- Fired Up, 2009 (Book 1 of the Dreamlight trilogy)
- In Too Deep, 2010 (Book 1 of the Looking Glass trilogy)
- The Scargill Cove Case Files (), 2011

=== Dark Legacy ===
1. Copper Beach, 2012
2. Dream Eyes, 2013

=== Cutler, Sutter & Salinas ===
1. When All the Girls Have Gone, 2016
2. Promise Not To Tell, 2018
3. Untouchable, 2019

=== Fogg Lake ===
1. The Vanishing, 2020
2. All the Colors of the Night, 2021
3. Lightning in a Mirror, 2022

=== The Lost Night Files ===
1. Sleep No More, 2023
2. The Night Island, 2024
3. Shattering Dawn, January 7, 2025

=== Non-fiction ===
- Dangerous Men and Adventurous Women: Romance Writers on the Appeal of the Romance (also edited)

== As Amanda Quick ==
Stand-alone novels
Title	Date of first publication
Seduction	1990
Surrender	1990
Scandal	1991
Rendezvous	1991
Ravished	1992
Reckless	1992
Dangerous	1993
Deception	1993
Desire	1993
Mistress	1994
Mystique	1995
Mischief	1996
Affair	1997
The Paid Companion	2004
Wait Until Midnight	2005
The River Knows	2007
Otherwise Engaged	2014
Garden of Lies	2015
'Til Death Do Us Part	2016

=== Vanza ===
1. With This Ring, 1998
2. I Thee Wed, 1999
3. Wicked Widow, 2000
4. Lie by Moonlight, 2005

=== Lake & March ===
1. Slightly Shady, 2001
2. Don't Look Back, 2002
3. Late for the Wedding, 2003

=== Arcane Society ===
- Second Sight (Book 1), 2006
- The Third Circle (Book 4), 2008
- The Perfect Poison (Book 6), 2009
- Burning Lamp (Book 2 of the Dreamlight trilogy), 2010
- Quicksilver (Book 2 of the Looking Glass trilogy), 2011

=== Ladies of Lantern Street ===
1. Crystal Gardens, 2012
2. The Mystery Woman, 2013

=== Burning Cove, California ===
1. The Girl Who Knew Too Much, 2017
2. The Other Lady Vanishes, 2018
3. Tightrope, 2019
4. Close Up, 2020
5. The Lady Has a Past, 2021
6. When She Dreams, 2022
7. The Bride Wore White, 2023
