= Nhị độ mai =

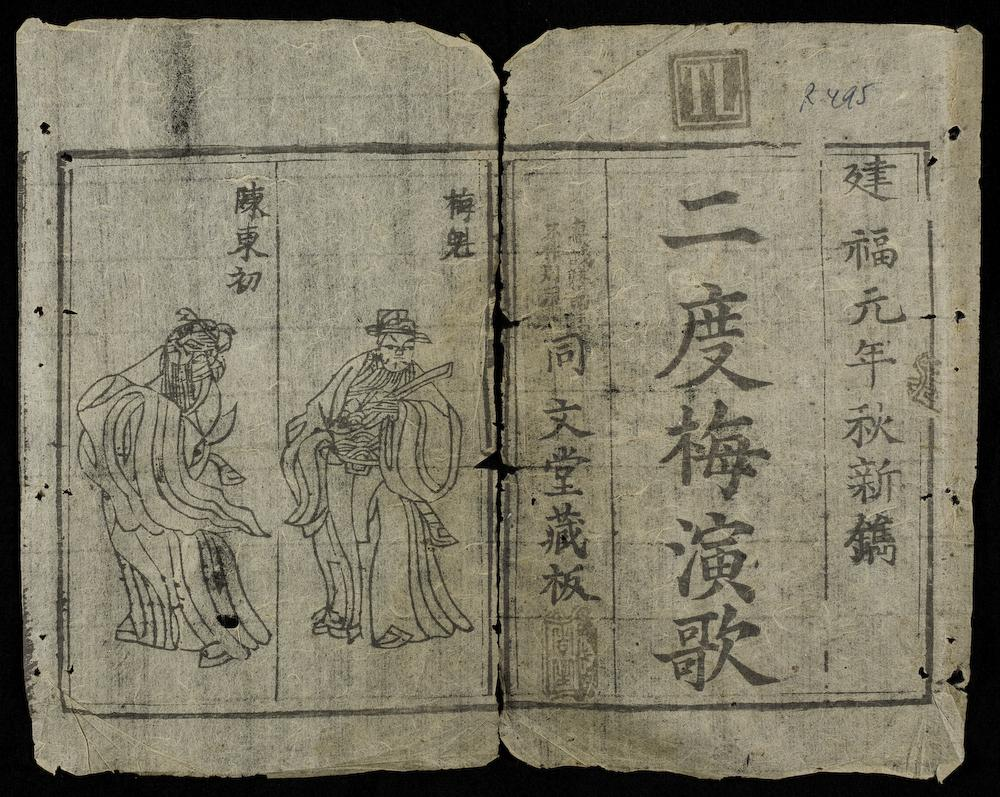
First two pages of Nhị độ mai

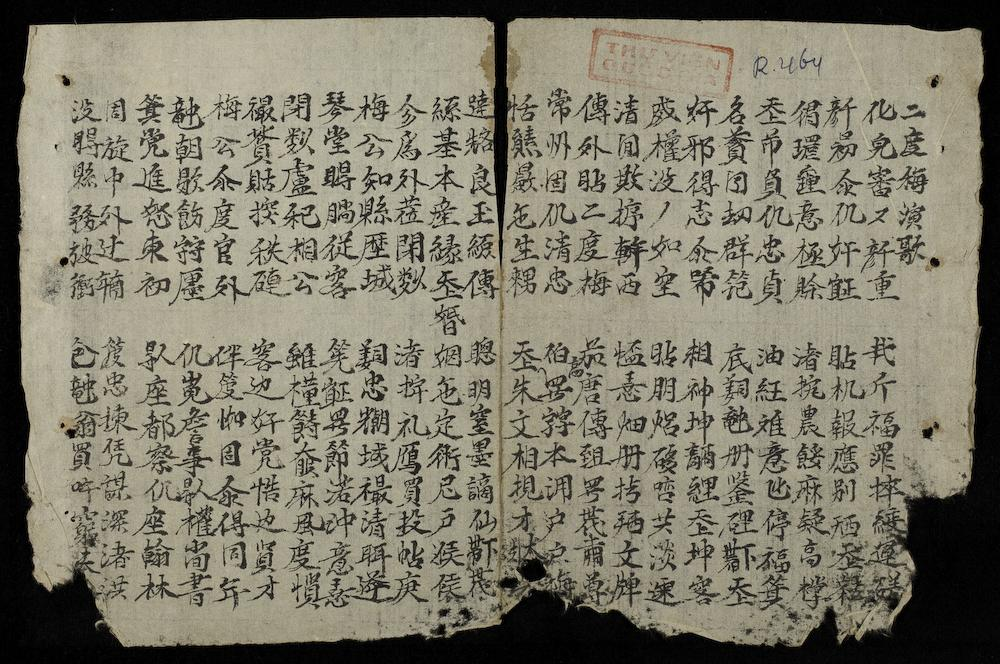
Second page of Nhị độ mai

Nhị độ mai (二度梅, "The Plum Tree Blossoms Twice") is a 19th century Nôm poem of Vietnam. The poem is adapted from the Chinese caizi jiaren romantic novel Erdu mei. Like the original Chinese novel, the story is set during the Tang dynasty.

== Text ==
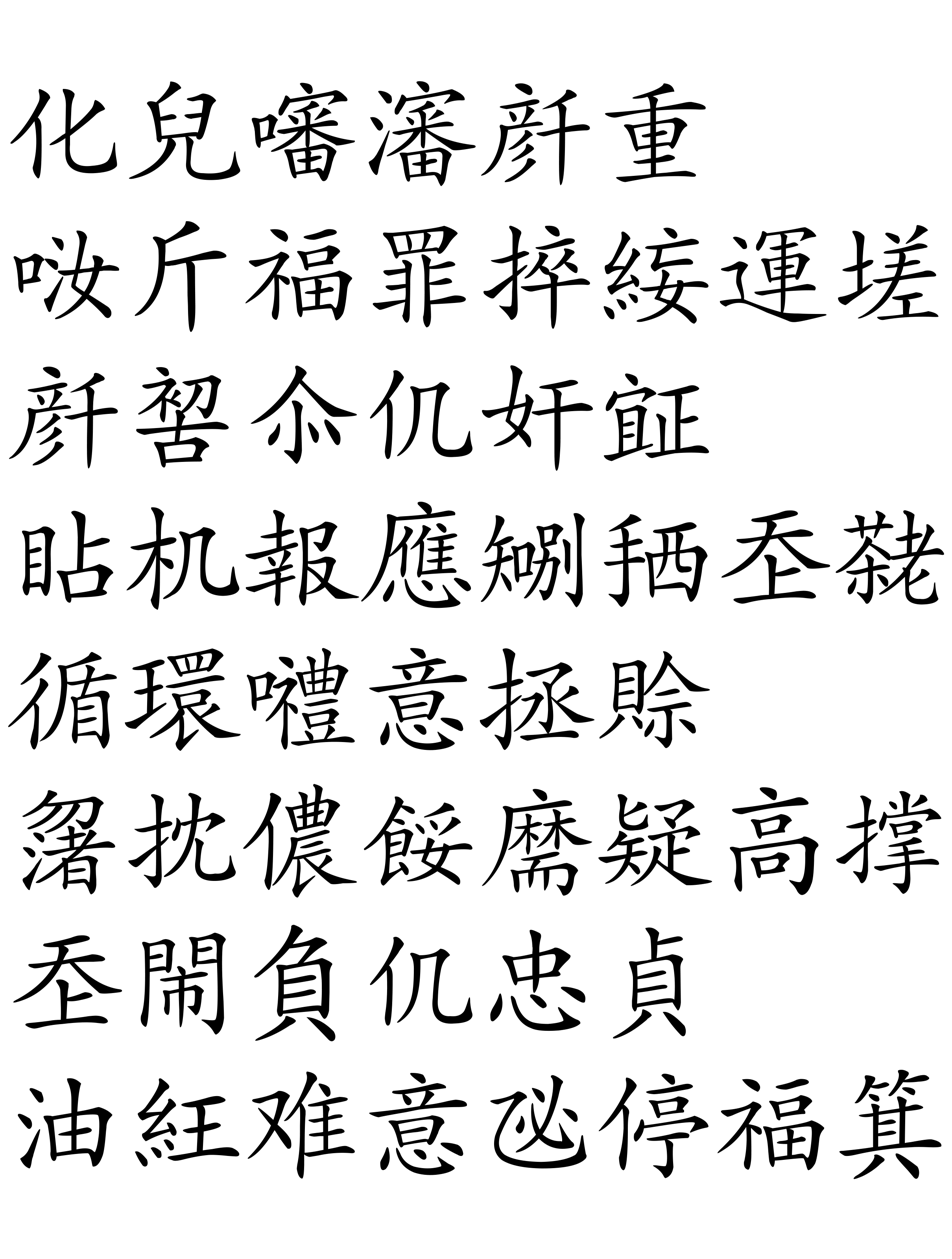

This is the first eight lines of the poem
Vietnamese Chữ Nôm (chữ Nôm, 𡨸喃)	Vietnamese alphabet (chữ Quốc Ngữ, 𡨸國語)
化兒𡂹瀋𠦳重	Hoá nhi thăm thẳm nghìn trùng
𠲤斤福罪捽𥿺運𡏦	Nhắc cân phúc tội, rút vòng vần xây
𠦳𠸗𫣿仉奸𣦍	Ngàn xưa mấy kẻ gian ngay
䀡机報應𪿍𢬣𡗶𫅷	Xem cơ báo ứng biết tay trời già
循環𡅏意拯賒	Tuần hoàn lẽ ấy chẳng xa
𠤆抌儂餒𦓡疑高撑	Chớ đem nông nỗi mà ngờ cao xanh
𡗶閙負仉忠貞	Trời nào phụ kẻ trung trinh
油𥿁难意𢖮停福箕	Dù vương nạn ấy, ắt dành phúc kia
