= Flash (Krentz novel) =

1998 romance novel by Jayne Ann Krentz

- Author: Jayne Ann Krentz
- Language: English
- Genre: Contemporary romance, romantic suspense
- Publisher: Pocket Books
- Publication date: October 1998
- Publication place: United States
- Media type: Print (hardcover, paperback)
- Pages: 368
- ISBN: 978-0-671-52308-4

Flash is a contemporary romance written by Jayne Ann Krentz. It was released in hardback in October 1998, and soon named as a Romantic Times top pick.

== Background ==
Jayne Ann Krentz is a prolific author, releasing books under three pseudonyms. As Amanda Quick, she writes historical romance; as Jayne Castle she writes paranormal romance, and under her own name she releases contemporary romance novels. Krentz sold her first novel in 1979, and since then writes between two and four novels a year. In 1998, she published two novels. Sharp Edges, released in April, was her 20th consecutive New York Times bestseller. Flash was released next, in October 1998.

Like many of her novels, Flash was set in Seattle, Washington, where Krentz lives.

== Plot summary ==
After the death of her uncle, Olivia Chantry inherits 49% of the company that he had owned. His silent partner, Jasper Sloan, has control over the other 51%. As the story begins, they distrust each other, fearing that the other person will ruin the business. Soon, they learn that someone is blackmailing the company. Olivia and Jasper become a team to neutralize the threat to the company. As they work more closely together, they begin to trust each other, and then they fall in love.

== Themes ==
Critic Erin Young believes this novel, along with Krentz's other novels Soft Focus and Sharp Edges, are carving out a new subgenre of the romance novel, the corporate romance. In these works, the hero and heroine are professional equals. In Flash, the protagonists share control of a business and also each own their own successful businesses. Unlike in many earlier contemporary romance novels, the central conflict is a battle for control of work-related endeavors. They form a partnership not because they like each other, but because they cannot achieve their professional goals alone.

Family is a recurring theme in Flash. The company that Olivia and Jasper own primarily employees Olivia's blood relatives. Their roles within the company are similar to their roles within the family hierarchy. The employees use their personal connections to help each other and each other's business ventures. Jasper, who is unused to having the lines being home and work blurred in this manner, is at first resistant to the idea of family and family employees. As he sees how lucrative the familial connections can be to the business, he becomes more open to the idea that family ties are good. By the end of the novel he has come full circle and embraces the nepotism of the business and desires a family of his own.

== Reception ==
Flash was a Romantic Times Top Pick, earning 4.5 out of 5 stars. Reviewer Jill Smith praised the book's humor. A Publishers Weekly review noted the formulaic nature of many of Krentz's plots, but concluded that Flash was an enjoyable example of Krentz's prowess in creating romantic suspense novels with charismatic characters.
