= Chan Kim Boon =

Chan Kim Boon (1851–1920) was a prominent Peranakan translator in Singapore who occasionally published under the penname Batu Gantong. He translated various historical Chinese-language novels, including Romance of the Three Kingdoms and Water Margin, into Baba Malay.

== Early life and education ==
Chan was born in Penang in 1851. His father was Chan Yong Chuan, a trader whose business interests were mostly in Padang. He attended the Penang Free School and received private tuition in Chinese. He then attended the Fuzhou Naval School. In 1867, he began serving as a mathematics tutor to several military men, including Admiral Sa Zhenbing and Chih Chen Lo Feng Luh, a Chinese diplomat.

== Career ==
In January 1897, he returned to Penang to visit his widowed mother. In March, he arrived in Singapore and joined the legal firm Aitken & Rodyk as an administrator. After work, he would translate various Chinese novels into Baba Malay. His best known work was Samkok, a translation of the historical Chinese novel Romance of the Three Kingdoms which was published by Kim Sek Chye Press from 1892 to 1896. The novel was translated with the help of Chia Ann Siang and Tan Kheam Hock. From 1891 to 1893, he published Hong Keow, which he completed due to popular demand, as well as requests for the remaining volumes to be translated from Chia and Cheah Choo Yew. From 1891 to 1892, he published Gnoh Bee Yean, a translation of Wu Mei Yuan. From 1899 to 1902, he published Song Kang, a translation of the novel Water Margin. From 1911 to 1913, he published Kou Chey Thian pergi di negri Seh Thian C’hu Keng, a translation of the novel Journey to the West. While some of his works were submitted to Kim Sek Chye Press, a majority of his works were self-published.

Chan was a member of the Celestial Reasoning Association and a council member of the Chinese Philomathic Society. He was also a member of the Lee Cheng Yan Club.

== Death ==
Chan had several children. He died in 1920. Following his death, the translation of stories into Baba Malay declined as the Peranakan community began to prefer English-language books.
