= Ernü Yingxiong Zhuan =

1878 novel by Yanbei Xianren

Cover of the novel Ernü Yingxiong Zhuan from the early 20th century

Ernü Yingxiong Zhuan (simplified Chinese: 儿女英雄传; traditional Chinese: 兒女英雄傳; lit. 'The Story of Heroic Boys and Heroic Girls'), sometimes translated into English as A Tale of Lovers and Heroes and A Tale of Heroic Lovers, is a Chinese novel in 40 chapters first printed in 1878 during the late Qing dynasty. It is written by Yanbei Xianren (燕北闲人), the pen name of Wen Kang (文康 fl. 1821-1850), a Manchu of an Eight Banner family. The novel is composed of vignettes that concern He Yufeng (何玉凤), also called "Thirteenth Sister" (十三妹). He Yufeng seeks revenge for her father, who died in prison because of persecution by a high official. She rescues a virtuous young woman, Ms. Zhang, and a heroic young scholar, An Ji (安骥) from cannibals. When An Ji becomes a high official, he marries both Hu and Zhang and when a new emperor ascends the throne, her father finally receives justice. Her actions are characterized by the traditional Confucian virtues, loyalty, piety, righteousness, love and heroism but the resolution of the novel comes through luck, or fate.

== Place in the history of the Chinese novel ==
The outline of the plot seems to borrow from Haoqiu zhuan, a 17th-century scholar-beauty romance in which a well-educated young lady acts bravely and independently but within the confines of propriety. The novel brings together two separate genres, chivalric fiction and scholar-beauty romance novels, among the first to do so. The critic Lee Haiyan remarks that the novel is also "highly original in its efforts to incorporate the moral and aesthetic insights of the cult of qing into orthodox Confucianism," that is, the cult of "feeling."

The scholar Maram Epstein finds the novel "remarkable" for its "depiction of elite women who assume the roles of scholars, statesmen, and knights-errant." In contrast to Dream of the Red Chamber, where the women were "ten times" better than the men but were confined to the domestic sphere, the women in this novel displace men in their traditionally male roles, even in the Confucian roles of social engagement. It opens with this observation:

Most people nowadays regard ernü and yingxiong as two different kinds of people... They mistakenly think that those who indulge in force and like fighting are "yingxiong", while those who toy with rouge and powder or have a weakness for catamites are "ernű" ... What they don't realize is that only when one has the pure nature of a hero can one fully possess a loving heart, and only when one is a truly filial child can one perform heroic deeds....

Lee contrasts this with the homosocial world of chivalric fiction of earlier times, which displayed a hostile attitude toward women and their corrupting influence.

The novel was adapted a number of times into films and television.

== References and further reading ==
- Berg, Daria (2002), Mair, Victor (ed.), Columbia History of Chinese Literature, New York: Columbia University Press, pp. 671–672
- Epstein, Maram (2001). Competing Discourses: Orthodoxy, Authenticity, and Engendered Meanings in Late Imperial Chinese Fiction. Cambridge, MA: Harvard University Asia Center : distributed by Harvard University Press. ISBN 0674005120., esp Ch. 6"Masterful Women and Deficient Men in Jinghua yuan and Ernü Yingxiong zhuan.
- Hamm, John Christopher (1998), "Reading the Swordswoman's Tale: Shisanmei and Ernü yingxiong zhuan", T'oung Pao, Second Series, 84 (4/5), Brill: 328–355, doi:10.1163/1568532982630651, JSTOR 4528761
- Lee, Haiyan (2007). Revolution of the Heart: A Genealogy of Love in China, 1900-1950. Stanford, CA: Stanford University Press. ISBN 978-0804754170., esp. "Ernü Yingxiong As Confucian Romantic," pp. 51–58.
