= Tiehua xianshi =

Qing Chinese novel by Yunfeng Shanren

A copy of the novel Tiehua xianshi from the Harvard-Yenching Library

Pages from a Japanese edition of the novel

Tiehua xianshi (traditional Chinese: 鐵花仙史; simplified Chinese: 铁花仙史), also translated into English as A History of the Immortal and Iron Flower or History of the Iron-Flower Immortals, is a Chinese novel of the Qing dynasty. Its authorship is ascribed to Yunfeng Shanren (雲封山人), which is a pseudonym. The novel consists of 26 chapters and was written in the Kangxi era (1662–1722). It is often categorized as a "caizi jiaren" romance novel, however, the novel also has various adventure elements that would be considered as part of "wuxia" (chivalry and martial-arts) and fantasy genres, and it is not simply just a love story.
