= Sharp Edge =

Sharp Edge may refer to:

- Sharp Edge (Blencathra), an arête in the Lake District
- Sharp Edge (horse), a racehorse
- Operation Sharp Edge, carried out by the United States Marine Corps in Liberia in 1990 and 1991
- Sharp Edge, a character in the anime series Super Life-Form Transformers: Beast Wars Neo

== See also ==
- Sharp Edges, a novel
