= Sharp Edges =

Sharp Edges is a contemporary romance written by Jayne Ann Krentz. It was published in hardcover by Pocket Books in February 1998 and became Krentz's 20th consecutive novel on the New York Times Bestseller List.

== Background ==
Jayne Ann Krentz is a prolific author, releasing books under three pseudonyms. As Amanda Quick, she writes historical romance; as Jayne Castle she writes paranormal romance, and under her own name she releases contemporary romance novels. Sharp Edges, her twelfth novel under the Krentz name, was published on February 1, 1998 by Pocket Books.

== Plot summary ==
The heroine of Sharp Edges, Eugenia Swift, is the director of the glass collection at an art museum. The museum is bequeathed a number of glass works collected by Adam Daventry. Eugenia travels to Daventry's home, on Fog Cove Island in Washington State, to catalog the collection. She is accompanied by Cyrus Colfax, a private investigator and owner of a security firm, who has been hired by Daventry's heirs to investigate his recent death.

Both of the protagonists have hidden motives for the trip. Eugenia is also investigating the death of her friend, Daventry's mistress, who died the day after Daventry. Cyrus is looking for a stolen glass cup. In order to keep their mutual suspicions a secret from the other residents of the island, Eugenia and Cyrus pretend to be in a romantic relationship. As they investigate the mysteries, their relationship deepens, and at the end of the novel they become engaged.

== Themes ==
The protagonists in this novel follow the romance novel trope that opposites attract. The heroine is quick to speak and act, while the hero takes his time to think before making decisions or speaking. Even their clothing choices highlight their mismatch: she is more elegant, while he is prone to wearing casual Hawaiian shirts.

Critic Erin Young believes this novel, along with Krentz's later books Soft Focus and Flash, are carving out a new subgenre of the romance novel, the corporate romance. In these works, the hero and heroine are professional equals. Sharp Edges' Eugenia has had significant professional success and is not intimidated by Cyrus, who is a business owner. Unlike in many earlier contemporary romance novels, the central conflict in Sharp Edges is a battle for control of work-related endeavors. Eugenia and Cyrus bicker over who should make the decisions as they attempt to solve several mysteries. They form a partnership not because they like each other, but because they cannot achieve their professional goals alone.

== Reception ==
Kirkus Reviews noted that Krentz frequently recycles plot points and character types across her novels. Although the review admitted that the result is usually imaginative and charming, the plot of Sharp Edges was judged to be "regrettably pedestrian". A review in People concurred, stating that the plot was quite predictable. The novel's "sarcasm and snappy double entendres", however, resulted in an enjoyable book despite its plot shortcomings. A Publishers Weekly review praised the characterization of the main characters, labeling them "endearing curmudgeons", but noted that, as in most of her novels, Krentz's villain was essentially a parody.

Sharp Edges reached number 9 on the New York Times Bestseller List for hardcover fiction. It was her 20th consecutive novel to appear on the list.
