= Qingmeng tuo =

Chinese novel of the early Qing dynasty

Chapter one of the novel Qingmeng tuo

Pages from volume two of the novel

Qingmeng tuo (traditional Chinese: 情夢柝; simplified Chinese: 情梦柝; lit. 'The Love[rs] Dream Clapper') is a caizi jiaren Chinese novel of the early Qing dynasty. It was written by Anyang Jiumin (安陽酒民), a writer under a pseudonym, and was written in the late seventeenth-century and published in the early eighteenth-century.

The novel depicts the love story of Hu Chuqing and Shen Ruosu and it is set during the Ming dynasty Chongzhen period. The novel is known for its depictions of various masquerading identities, in which the male protagonist masquerade as a servant to get close to his lover, while the female protagonist also disguises herself as a man.
