= Lin er bao =

17th c. Chinese romantic novel

Chapter one of the novel Lin er bao

Lin er bao or Lin'er bao (traditional Chinese: 麟兒報; simplified Chinese: 麟儿报), also translated into English as Son of Good Fortune, is a Chinese romantic novel of the 17th-century written by an anonymous writer. The novel is often categorized as one of the caizi jiaren novels that were massively popular during the late Ming and early Qing eras.

The earliest extant edition of the novel is a 1672 printed edition from the early Qing period that is now located in the Dalian Library.
