= Dingqing ren =

17th-century Chinese romantic novel

Title page of the novel Dingqing ren

A page of the novel

Dingqing ren (Chinese: 定情人; 'A Lover's Promise'), also translated into English as A Love-Promise and The Worthy Lovers, is a Chinese romantic novel of the caizi jiaren genre from the mid-17th century. Its authorship is ascribed to Tianhuazang Zhuren (天花藏主人), a pseudonym for a writer. Ping Shan Leng Yan is another work of the same period that has been sometimes ascribed to the same writer.

The novel's title "Dingqing ren" has been interpreted to mean "the person who follows through on the pledge of love".

The earliest printed edition of the novel dates to the mid-17th century and is now held in the Dalian Library in Dalian, Liaoning. Copies of later editions (e.g. from the Qianlong era) can be found in the Peking University Library and the National Library of China.

== Plot ==
The story narrates the romantic journey of a young scholar named Shuang Xing and his devotion to Miss Jiang Ruizhu. In the story, the "test of chastity" is primarily focused on the male protagonist Shuang, as he endures numerous events in order to be reunited with Miss Jiang.
