= Ting Yue Lou =

Chinese caizi jiaren romance novel

A cover of the novel Ting Yue Lou with the slogan "The Number One Romance Book" (第一情書) attached to the title, from the Harvard University

Pages from chapter seven of the novel

Ting Yue Lou (traditional Chinese: 聽月樓; simplified Chinese: 听月楼; lit. 'Listening to the Moon Tower') is a Chinese caizi jiaren romance novel by an anonymous writer from the Jiaqing era (1796-1820) of the Qing dynasty. The novel consists of 20 chapters. An early printed edition of the novel dating to 1815 is now preserved in the Zhejiang University.

Some of the later 19th-century editions of the novel feature illustrations by the famed Chinese illustrator Wu Youru (呉友如; 1840–1894).

Illustrations of the characters in the novel by Wu Youru
