= Qiao Lian Zhu =

Chinese novel

- Traditional Chinese: 巧聯珠
- Simplified Chinese: 巧联珠
Transcriptions
Standard Mandarin
- Hanyu Pinyin: Qiǎo Lián Zhū

Qiao Lian Zhu is a Chinese novel of the caizi jiaren genre. The earliest extant edition of the novel dates to the early 18th century during the Yongzheng era. The novel was written by a writer under the pseudonym Yanxiayishi (煙霞逸士), with some asserting that it was an alias for the writer Liu Zhang (劉璋, born 1667), although this is disputed by others.

The novel narrates the love story between the talented scholar Wen Xiangru and the two beauties Fang Fangyun and Hu Qianyun.

Pages from a printed edition of the novel Qiao Lian Zhu (volume 1), from the Harvard-Yenching Library Chinese Rare Books Digitization Project - Qi Rushan collection National Library of China

Pages from a printed edition of the novel Qiao Lian Zhu (volume 2)
