= Soft Focus (novel) =

Soft Focus is a contemporary romance written by Jayne Ann Krentz. It was released in hardcover by Putnam on January 3, 2000, and reached number 12 on The New York Times Best Seller list.

== Background ==
Jayne Ann Krentz is a prolific author, releasing books under three pseudonyms. As Amanda Quick, she writes historical romance; as Jayne Castle she writes paranormal romance, and under her own name she releases contemporary romance novels. Krentz sold her first novel in 1979, and since then writes between two and four novels a year. Soft Focus was published in hardcover on January 3, 2000, by Putnam and released in paperback later that year. It was also a Doubleday Book Club selection.

== Plot summary ==
The heroine, Elizabeth Cabot, is the head of a venture capital firm. She begins a relationship with Jack Fairfax, who specializes in turning around failing businesses. After a single night together, she learns information that turns her against him, and she ends the relationship. Six months later, they are forced to work together when a new product is stolen from a company in which she has invested, that Jack is attempting to bring back to profitability.

Together, they trail the thief to a film noir festival in Colorado. As they work to solve the mystery, they fall in love.

== Themes ==
Critic Erin Young believes this novel, along with Krentz's other novels Flash and Sharp Edges, are carving out a new subgenre of the romance novel, the corporate romance. In these works, the hero and heroine are professional equals. In Soft Focus, the protagonists each own their own successful companies. Unlike in many earlier contemporary romance novels, the central conflict is a battle for control of work-related endeavors. They form a partnership not because they like each other, but because they cannot achieve their professional goals alone.

As in Flash, Krentz uses the theme of family ties helping to ease business life. Unlike in Flash, heroine Elizabeth is not working directly with her family members, yet her secretary Louise is described as such a close friend that she is family-like. Louise uses her personal connections to help Elizabeth and Jack enter a closed location, so that they could pursue their business goals. This reiterates Krentz's frequent plot point that family, or those considered so, can be an asset at work.

The novel is partially set at a film noir festival. Krentz brings this theme through the novel. The book references many classic noir films, and the plotting essentially puts the characters in a real film noir situation.

== Reception ==
Romantic Times named Soft Focus one of its Top Picks, giving it a 4.5 out 5 of star rating. Reviewer Jill Smith praised the "immensely entertaining" novel for its unique settings. A review in Kirkus criticized the underlying mystery plotline but praised the "flirtatious banter and steamy sex" as well as the characterization of the hero and heroine.

The novel reached number 12 on the New York Times Bestseller list for hardback fiction and number 15 on the New York Times Bestseller list for paperbacks in November 2000.
