= George Soulié de Morant =

George Soulié de Morant, born 1878 in Paris, died 1955 in Paris, French scholar and diplomat. Soulié de Morant worked several years in the French diplomatic corps in China, where he served as French consul in several Chinese cities. He is mainly known for his role in introducing acupuncture in the West and for his translations of Chinese literature.

== Education and career ==
Soulié de Morant had the opportunity to start learning Chinese at the age of eight, being taught the language by a Jesuit priest. Although he had originally intended to become a physician, he had to give up his plans when his father died.

At the age of twenty, Soulié de Morant was employed by a bank, which decided to send him to China in 1899. Given Soulié de Morant's command of the Chinese language, he soon joined the French diplomatic corps, for which he would work for most of the following two decades. He served as French consul in Shanghai and Kunming and French Mixed Court in Shanghai.

== Scholarly contributions ==
Soulié de Morant became convinced of the importance of acupuncture when he witnessed the effects of acupuncture treatment during an epidemic of cholera in Beijing. As he served as consul in several Chinese cities, he sought out teachers who could give him instruction in acupuncture.

After Soulié de Morant returned to France after several years of consular service, he was persuaded by the prominent advocate of alternative medicine, Paul Ferreyrolles (1880–1955), to put all his efforts into translating Chinese works on acupuncture. Beginning in 1929, he authored a number of articles and works on acupuncture and he became an advocate of acupuncture treatment in the French medical corps. His work l'Acuponcture chinoise, which was based on Chinese texts from the Ming dynasty such as Zhēnjiǔ Dàchéng (針灸大成), is still regarded as a classic work on acupuncture and has been published in several editions and translations.

Soulié de Morant also published a number of works on Chinese history, Chinese literature and Chinese art, as well as a number of translations of Chinese literary works.

== Works ==
- Éléments de grammaire mongole. E. Leroux 1903
- Les Mongols, leur organisation administrative d'après des documents chinois (1905)
- Les Musulmans du Yun-nan (1909)
- La musique en Chine. E. Leroux 1911
- Lotus-d'or. E. Fasquelle 1912
- Essai sur la littérature chinoise. Mercure de France 1912 (online copy (pdf))
- Les contes galants de la Chine. Charpentier et Fasquelle 1921
- Le Palais des cent fleurs. E. Fasquelle 1922
- La Passion de Yang Kwe-Fei. L’Edition d’art, Paris, 1924 (online copy (rtf))
- La brise au clair de lune. Grasset, Paris, 1925 (online copy (word)) – Translation of Haoqiu zhuan
- Le Problème des bronzes antiques de la Chine (1925)
- Exterritorialité et intérêts étrangers en Chine. Paris: Paul Geuthner, 1925.
- Théâtre et musique modernes en Chine, avec une étude technique de la musique chinoise et transcriptions pour piano, par André Gaillard (1926)
- L'Amoureuse Oriole, jeune fille, roman d'amour chinois du XIIIe siècle. Avec dix illustrations chinoises. E. Flammarion 1928
- Histoire de l'art chinois. Payot 1928
- L'Épopée des jésuites français en Chine (1534-1928). Grasset 1928
- Histoire de la Chine de l’antiquité jusqu’en 1929. Paris: Payot, 1929.
- Les Preceptes de Confucius, 1929
- Divorce anglais. E. Flammarion 1930
- Anthologie de l'amour chinois. Mercure de France 1932
- Sciences occultes en Chine: la main. Nilson 1932
- Précis de la vraie acuponcture chinoise. Mercure de France 1934 (online copy)
- L'acuponcture chinoise. 2 vols. Paris: Mercure de France, 1939–1941. Published in English as Chinese acupuncture, edited by Paul Zmiewski. Brookline, MA: Paradigm Publications, 1994. ISBN 978-0-912111-31-5
- La Vie de Confucius. H. Piazza 1939
- Les 47 rônins: Le trésor des loyaux samouraïs
- Bijou de ceinture.

== See also ==
- Acupuncture
- Moxa
- Neijin
- Traditional Chinese medicine
