= Jiao Hong ji =

A page from a printed edition of Jiao Hong ji

An illustration of Jiao Hong ji

Jiao Hong ji (traditional Chinese: 嬌紅記; simplified Chinese: 娇红记), also called Jiao Hong zhuan (traditional Chinese: 嬌紅傳; simplified Chinese: 娇红传), also translated into English as The Story of Jiaoniang and Feihong, is a Chinese novella written in Classical Chinese by Song Meidong (宋梅洞) (given name Song Yuan 宋遠), a writer active c. 1290—1320 during the Yuan dynasty. The novella has been dated to the Dade era of Yuan dynasty (around 1299).

Jiao Hong ji was influenced by Tang dynasty chuanqi works, and in turn, the novella is considered a precursor to the caizi jiaren romance novels of the Ming and Qing dynasties. The novella was also influential on the development of the "cult of qing" during the late Ming dynasty. The novella was also adapted into a play of the same name during the 17th century by Meng Chengshun (孟稱舜).
