= Bai Gui Zhi =

The opening of the novel Bai Gui Zhi

Bai Gui Zhi (Chinese: 白圭志), also translated into English as The White Jade, is a Chinese caizi jiaren romance novel from the late 18th century during the Qing dynasty. The novel was written by a writer named Cui Xiangchuan (崔象川) and was thought to have been completed in 1798.

The story of the novel is set during the Jiajing to Wanli eras of the Ming dynasty.

Inside pages from the second volume of the novel

Illustrations of characters of Bai Gui Zhi, from the Harvard-Yenching Library

Illustrations of characters of Bai Gui Zhi, from the Harvard-Yenching Library
