= Shuishi yuan =

18th c. Chinese romantic novel

The opening of the novel Shuishi yuan

Pages from a printed edition of the novel (volume three)

Shuishi yuan (traditional Chinese: 水石緣; simplified Chinese: 水石缘; lit. 'Fate Between Water and Stone'), (Note: Also known in Chinese as Sai tao yuan (traditional Chinese: 賽桃源; simplified Chinese: 赛桃源) and a few other alternative published titles.) also translated as Marriage Between Water and Stone, is a Chinese romantic caizi jiaren novel of the 18th century during the Qing dynasty. The novel was written by Li Chunrong (李春榮). It consists of 30 chapters.

An early printed edition of the novel that dates to 1774 is located in the National Library of China.
