= Ying Yun meng =

The opening of the novel Ying Yun meng

Pages from chapter five of the novel

Ying Yun meng (traditional Chinese: 英雲夢; simplified Chinese: 英云梦; lit. 'Ying-Yun's Dream') or Ying Yun meng zhuan (traditional Chinese: 英雲夢傳; simplified Chinese: 英云梦传), is a Chinese romantic caizi jiaren novel from around 1783. Its authorship is ascribed to a writer named Jiu Rong Lou Zhu Ren Song Yun (九容樓主人松雲), which is a pseudonym. The title refers to the names of the novel's two female protagonists, Wu Mengyun and Xu Yingniang. The earliest extant edition of the novel is now kept in the Peking University Library.
