= Wu Jiang Xue =

Chinese romantic novel

Scan of chapter 17 of the novel from the National Library of China

Wu Jiang Xue (traditional Chinese: 吳江雪; simplified Chinese: 吴江雪), is a Chinese "caizi jiaren" romantic novel of the 17th century. Its date of composition have been dated by various scholars to either around 1605 in the late Ming dynasty or around mid 17th-century during the early Qing dynasty. Its authorship is ascribed to a writer named Pei Hengzi (佩蘅子). The novel consists of 24 chapters.

Title page of the novel from a modern edition

A page from chapter 5 of the novel
