= Huatu yuan =

Novel by Buyue Zhuren

The cover of a modern 1948 edition of the novel

Inside pages of a printed edition of the novel Huatu yuan

Huatu yuan (traditional Chinese: 畫圖緣; simplified Chinese: 画图缘), (Note: Also known in Chinese as Hua tian jin yu yuan (traditional Chinese: 花田金玉緣; simplified Chinese: 花田金玉缘) and a few other titles.) also translated into English as A Destiny in Two Paintings, is a classic Chinese novel that was published in the late 17th century during the early Qing dynasty. A romantic caizi jiaren novel, it was written by Buyue Zhuren (步月主人), a writer under a pseudonym.
