= Haoqiu zhuan =

17th-century Chinese novel

- Traditional Chinese: 好逑傳
- Simplified Chinese: 好逑传
- Literal meaning: "The pleasing history" or "The fortunate union"
Transcriptions
Standard Mandarin
- Hanyu Pinyin: Hǎoqiú zhuàn
- Wade–Giles: Hao-ch'iu chuan

The Fortunate Union: A Romance, an 1829 translation by John Francis Davis

Haoqiu zhuan (translated into English variously as The Fortunate Union or The Pleasing History), also known as Hau Kiou Choaan, is a Chinese caizi jiaren ("scholar and beauty") novel published in the 17th century during the Qing Dynasty. The author is known only under the name "Man of the Teaching of Names" (名教中人; Míngjiāo Zhōngrén; Ming-chiao Chung-jen). The identity of the author and exact date of publishing are unknown. Caizi jiaren fictional works published at that time were typically published and written under a pseudonym.

According to Philippe Postel, author of "Les traductions françaises du Haoqiu zhuan", the most commonly stated date of authorship is 1683, at the beginning of the Qing Dynasty. After 1712, the story was given the subtitle Xiayi fengyue zhuan (俠義風月傳; 侠义风月传; Xiáyì fēngyuè zhuàn; Hsia-i Feng-yüeh chuan, "A Tale of Chivalry and Love").

English language translation of the novel appeared as early as 1761, and then was translated into German in 1766. In 1810, George Staunton, who had lived in China while his father worked for George Macartney's diplomatic mission, confirmed to Western audiences that a Chinese person created this work. Chloë F. Starr, author of Red-Light Novels of the Late Qing, wrote that this novel was among the best-known caizi jiaren novels. Maram Epstein, author of Competing Discourses: Orthodoxy, Authenticity, and Engendered Meanings in Late Imperial Chinese Fiction, described the novel as being "moralistic". The story has eighteen chapters.

== Plot ==
Volume II of the English translation by John Wilkinson and Thomas Percy

The beauty, Shui Bingxin, and the scholar, Tie Zhongyu, want to avenge their fathers and oppose the bureaucracy, which is corrupt. Shui Bingxin's uncle wants her to marry a son of an official with a lot of power, but Shui Bingxin does not want to, citing dissoluteness. Tie Zhongyu rescues Shui Bingxin, and the two begin to live together. Because the two now live together, the uncle spreads rumors that suggest Shui Bingxin is no longer a virgin. Tie Zhongyu focuses on his studies after Shui Bingxin persuades him to. The two lovers marry after Tie Zhongyu receives the top ranking of the metropolitan examination.

Due to the rumors, Shui Bingxin does not want to have sexual intercourse with Tie Zhongyu. At the end, the Empress oversees a physical examination of Shui Bingxin. In this way, the Empress verifies the virginity of Shui Bingxin. The Emperor of China gives rewards to those loyal to him and punishes those guilty of crimes. Finally, the two lovers consummate their union.

== Characters ==
- Shui Bingxin (水冰心; Shuǐ Bīngxīn; Shui Ping-hsin) - Shui Bingxin is the beauty character. Epstein states that Shui Bingxin is "unrelentingly stern in her commitment to Confucian morality". In the 1761 translation her name is written as Shuey-ping-sin. In the Fortunate Union translation her name is written as Shueypingsin.
- Tie Zhongyu (鐵中玉; 铁中玉; Tiě Zhōngyù; T'ieh Chung-yü) - Tie Zhongyu is the scholar character. Epstein states that Tie Zhongyu is "unusually strong and daring compared with other characters of his type". "Tie" means iron. In the 1761 translation his name is written as Tieh-chung-u. In the Fortunate Union translation his name is Teihchungyu.

== Style and approach ==
Pages of a printed edition of Haoqiu zhuan

Haoqiu zhuan was written to easily allow the reader to follow the story by strengthening the internal consistency of the narrative, often by full and frequent recapitulations to third parties within the story. Starr stated that as a consequence, the novel "painfully" over-repeats itself. Chloë F. Starr writes that the novel has very little description of interior thought, a common feature in 17th century Chinese novels. The novel often uses an eyewitness delivering a soliloquy as a way to recall events not seen by the principal characters. For instance a monk tells another character that there was a plot to poison the hero and that he himself had a part in this role; Starr states "the question of the addressee is left unresolved in this clumsy technique."

Keith McMahon comments that the lovers in Haoqiu zhuan "are like stereotyped opposites of the characters in earlier works." The love of the scholar and the beauty "sharply contrasts" with depictions in late Ming fiction, where love is erotic rather than spiritual. Now "sentiment replaces libido" and "refined, internal feelings replace vulgar, external sensations." The very name of the beauty, Bing Xin (Ice-Heart), conveys her chastity and emotional control, though she is at the same time loyal and loving. Tie Zhongyu (Jade-within-iron) is in a sense a feminized hero, rather than the passionate and indulgent lover of the late Ming ideal. Although there is only an implicit criticism of qing (emotion) which was so prominent in late Ming fiction, the lovers here maintain a balance between li (propriety) and feeling (qing). They marry only when her father grants permission, even though he urges her to decide for herself, and even after they are wed they do not consummate their marriage until the empress herself refutes the villains and confirms that Bingxin is a virgin.

== Translations ==
=== English ===
The first European translations occurred in the 18th century. With the exception of short works, this was the first Chinese novel translated into a European language.

The first English edition was translated by a British merchant, James Wilkinson, resident in Canton (Guangzhou). Wilkinson translated about 75% into English and another person translated the remainder into Portuguese. James St. André, author of "Modern Translation Theory and Past Translation Practice: European Translations of the Haoqiu zhuan", wrote that "[i]t is suspected that" the translation was written while Wilkinson did the translation as part of his learning Chinese. St. André stated that the person who completed the translation "is suspected" to be a Portuguese man living in Macau, Wilkinson's tutor. In 1761 Thomas Percy, the Bishop of Dromore, had published this version anonymously; before Percy published it, the Portuguese portion was translated into English and the entire version had been edited. Percy published the second edition in 1774, and in it he revealed Wilkinson's identity and his own identity. This was the first ever translation of a Chinese novel in a European language. When Percy was alive he tried but failed to verify that it was indeed a work of fiction created by a Chinese person; he asked Macartney for assistance, but the assistance did not help him verify the work.

In 1829 a member of the Royal Asiatic Society, John Francis Davis, translated Haoqiu zhuan, using the title The Fortunate Union.

Alexander Brebner published "The Pleasing History [an adaptation of a translation of a Chinese story]" in 1895.

In 1899 an anonymous individual published Shueypinsin: A story made from the Chinese romance Haoukewchuen.

In 1926 the 1925 French translation of Haoqiu zhuan by George Soulié de Morant was translated into English.

=== French ===
The Wilkinson/Percy English version was also translated into French; St. André stated that "some say" the French version was directly translated from the German translation of the Wilkinson/Percy English version.

St. André stated that a French edition published in 1828 "[seems]" to have originated from an English version.

A French translation of the Davis English version was created by Guillard D'Arcy and published in 1842.

George Soulié de Morant published La brise au claire de lune, Le deuxième livre de genie, a French translation in 1925. According to Morant, it was the first French version that was based directly on the Chinese text. Morant had used an alternate title as the title of his translation.

=== Other translations ===
Christoph Gottlieb von Murr translated the Wilkinson/Percy first English version into German. Johan van der Woude provided a Dutch translation of the work, under the title Wat de wind fluistert bij maneschijn (Antwerpen: Het Kompas, 1944).

In 1831, a fragment from the novel was anonymously translated into Russian directly from Chinese and published in the Northern Flowers almanach edited by Alexander Pushkin. This was the first translation of a piece of the Chinese prose into Russian.

Takizawa Bakin made the Japanese version, Kyōkakuden.

St. André stated that a German edition published in 1869 "[seems]" to have originated from an English version.

In 1925 a German translation was published. In 1927 Franz Kuhn directly translated Haoqiu zhuan from Chinese to German. This version has been republished on several occasions.

== Footnoted editions ==
In Shanghai, Frederick Baller published a Chinese-language version of Haoqiu zhuan with footnotes in English. He published this version in 1904 and in 1911.

== Reception ==
Like many of the caizi jiaren novels, Haoqiu zhuan was not taken seriously by Confucian literati, as they often dismissed these novels as "light-hearted romantic comedies". James St. André, author of "Modern Translation Theory and Past Translation Practice: European Translations of the Haoqiu zhuan", wrote that in China the novel was originally "considered second-rate fiction and stood in danger of being completely forgotten with changes in literary taste in the early twentieth century." He stated that because there had been interest in translating the novel into English, this "gave life and fame" to Haoqiu zhuan and therefore affected its standing in China.

== Legacy ==
The basic plot of the novel Ernü Yingxiong Zhuan originates from Haoqiu zhuan.
