= Wu Mei Yuan =

19th-century Chinese romantic novel

The opening of the novel Wu Mei Yuan from a printed edition

Wu Mei Yuan or Wumei yuan (traditional Chinese: 五美緣; simplified Chinese: 五美缘), translated into English as the Destinies of Five Beauties, is a Chinese romantic novel of the early 19th century during the Qing dynasty. The novel is usually categorized as one of the caizi jiaren novels. Its authorship is ascribed to a writer named Jisheng Shi (寄生氏), which is a pseudonym, however, this is also disputed. It consists of 80 chapters. An early printed edition of the novel dating to 1822 is located in the National Library of China.
