= Sweet Starfire =

1986 novel by Jayne Ann Krentz

Sweet Starfire is a futuristic romance written by Jayne Ann Krentz and released in 1986. Krentz likened the novel to a historical romance set in another world, and its success inspired her to begin writing historical romances under the pseudonym Amanda Quick.

== Background ==
In the early 1980s, Krentz wrote several contemporary romances under the pen name Stephanie James. One of these, The Devil to Pay, released in 1985, featured a heroine who wrote science fiction novels. Readers enjoyed the small science fiction references in the story, inspiring Krentz to incorporate those elements into a romance plot.

Before the 1980s, there was little overlap between the popular fiction genres of romance novels and science fiction. 1984 (published in 1949) by George Orwell does feature a relationship set in a dystopian future. But beginning in the early 1980s, time travel themes began to appear in some romances, but the novels focused primarily on the difficulties of assimilation as a conflict between the hero and heroine. Krentz's follow-up to The Devil to Pay, Sweet Starfire, was the first romance novel to fully embrace science fiction precepts. It launched the futuristic romance subgenre.

The novel was initially released in 1986. It was re-released in 2002 in an omnibus edition with Crystal Flame. Krentz credits these two novels with giving her the inspiration to write historical romances. She has since released more than a dozen bestselling historical romances under the pen name Amanda Quick.

== Plot summary ==
The novel is set in a futuristic universe. The hero, Teague Severance, is captain of a starship that operates on the frontiers of the galaxy. Cidra Rainforest hires him to help her find a shrine built by the Ghosts, an alien race which has gone extinct. The shrine to hold the secret to perfect mental communion, which is highly desired among the sect to which Cidra belongs. The journey brings them to the planet Renaissance, where Teague battles an old enemy. Cidra saves his life.

The duo eventually find the shrine. Cidra discovers that she is not a true member of the sect - rather than seeking mental communion at all costs, she is a fighter, wanting a good life for herself. She joins Teague's sect. By now, the protagonists are in love and prepared to spend their lives together.

== Genre ==
Sweet Starfire is in some ways a classic romance novel. While on a journey, the heroine meets a man who is the opposite of everything she thought she wanted and by the end of the novel they have fallen in love.

The novel is set in a futuristic world. The plot uses several tropes common to science fiction novels. The hero's home is in a remote part of the galaxy which is still becoming used to the idea of spaceflight. He is more rugged, physical rather than intellectual.

Krentz remarked that the novel is essentially a historical romance set in a different world.

== Themes ==
The race the protagonists seek are revealed to be extinct because they essentially gave up on the messiness of life in favor of the ideal of mental harmony. They stopped bearing children, and the race died out. The heroine expresses anger that the Ghosts essentially gave up on continuing their line. She chooses to turn her back on the sect that also favors mental harmony in favor of one that values love and families and is willing to fight for those ideals. Critic John J. Pierce attributes this Darwinian philosophy to the influence of Robert Heinlein, whose books were favorites of Krentz.

== Reception ==
Romantic Times awarded the novel 4.5 out of 5 stars. Reviewer Tara Gelsomino praised the depth of the emotional relationship that Krentz created between the protagonists and the sexual tension that simmered between them.

== Sources ==
- Pierce, John J. (1994). Odd Genre: A Study in Imagination and Evolution. Westport, CT: Greenwood Press. ISBN 0-313-26897-5.
