= Erdu mei =

18th-century Chinese romantic novel

Title page of the novel Erdu mei

Erdu mei (Chinese: 二度梅) or Erdu mei quanzhuan (traditional Chinese: 二度梅全傳; simplified Chinese: 二度梅全传), translated into English as The Plum Tree Flowers Twice or The Plum Blooms Again, is an 18th-century Chinese romantic novel from the early Qianlong era (1736-1795). Its authorship is ascribed to a writer named Xi Yin Tang Zhu Ren (惜陰堂主人), which is a pseudonym. Often categorized as a "caizi jiaren" romance novel, it consists of 40 chapters.

An illustration of characters from the novel

An illustration of characters from the novel
