= Jayne Ann Krentz =

American romance novelist (born 1948)

Jayne Ann Castle Krentz
- Born: Jayne Ann Castle; March 28, 1948 (age 78); Cobb, California, U.S.
- Education: University of California, Santa Cruz (BA); San Jose State University
- Occupation: Novelist
- Spouse: Frank Krentz
- Writing career
- Pen name: Jayne Castle; Jayne Taylor; Jayne Bentley; Stephanie James; Jayne Ann Krentz; Amanda Glass; Amanda Quick
- Period: 1979-present
- Genres: Romance, Suspense, Fantasy
- Website: www.krentz-quick.com

Signature
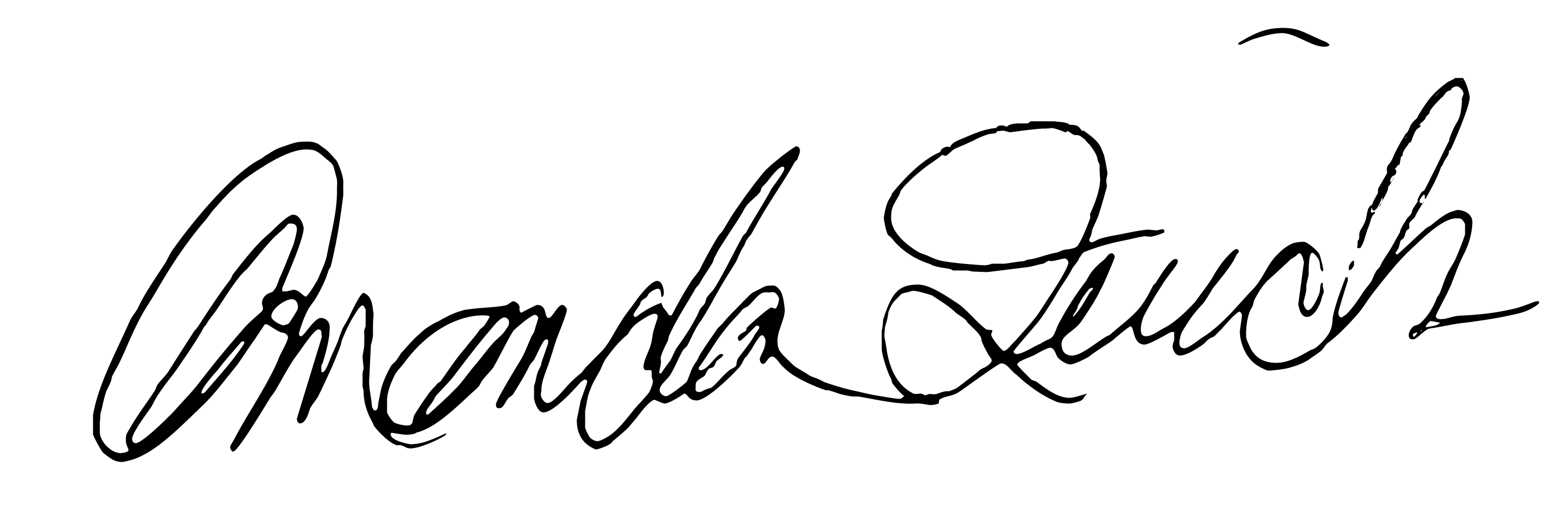

Jayne Ann Krentz, née Jayne Castle (born March 28, 1948, in Cobb, California, United States), is an American writer of romance novels. Krentz is the author of a string of New York Times bestsellers under seven different pseudonyms. Now, she only uses three names. Under her married name she writes contemporary romantic-suspense. She uses Amanda Quick for her novels of historical romantic-suspense. She uses her maiden name, Jayne Ann Castle, for futuristic/paranormal romantic-suspense writing.

Over 35 million copies of Krentz's novels are in print. With Sweet Starfire, she created the futuristic romance subgenre, and further expanded the boundaries of the genre in 1996 with Amaryllis, the first paranormal futuristic romantic suspense novel. She is an outspoken advocate for the romance genre and has been the recipient of the Susan Koppelman Award for Feminist Studies.

== Biography ==
=== Personal life ===
Jayne Ann Castle was born on March 28, 1948, in Cobb, California, United States. She and her two brothers were raised by their mother, Alberta, in Borrego Springs for the first decade of Jayne's life.

She earned a B.A in History at the University of California, Santa Cruz in 1970. Fearful that she would be unable to find a job using her degree, she elected to obtain her graduate degree in Library Science from San Jose State University. Immediately after graduation she married Frank Krentz, an engineer, whom she had met at San Jose State. The couple moved to the Virgin Islands, where Krentz worked for a year as an elementary school librarian, a time she refers to as "an unmitigated career disaster". Realizing that she enjoyed being a librarian but not the aspects of teaching that working in an elementary school required, Krentz moved into the higher levels of academia, including a stint in the Duke University library system. Krentz and her husband later moved to Seattle, Washington.

Krentz has been generous in sharing her wealth with libraries. She established the Castle Humanities Fund at UCSC's University Library to allow the library to purchase additional books and has given money to 15 Seattle-area elementary schools to enhance their library budgets. She is also a member of the Advisory Board for the Writers Programs at the University of Washington extension program.

=== Writing career ===
==== Early years ====
While working at Duke, Krentz began writing stories her way, combining elements of romance novels with paranormal twists. For six years she wrote and mailed proposals for new novels, consistently receiving rejection letters. She claims to have tried to stop writing several times during that period, but that it became a "compulsion". During this time she and her family moved to Seattle, Washington to further her husband's aerospace career.

==== Pseudonyms and genres ====
Krentz continued writing, and, in 1979, she sold her first novel, Gentle Pirate. That novel and several that followed were published within various category romance lines, as that was the only method in which contemporary romance was published. As more publishers began to release single-title contemporary romances, Krentz shifted into writing only single-title novels.

Her first novels were released under her birth name, Jayne Castle. Krentz signed a contract allowing one of her publishers to own the name, and, after leaving that publisher, Krentz was unable to use that name on new works for ten years. This led to the creation of several pseudonyms, including Jayne Taylor, Jayne Bentley, Stephanie James and Amanda Glass. By the mid-1980s she had begun using only her married name, Jayne Ann Krentz, for all of her contemporary romance novels.

Her 1986 novel, Sweet Starfire, was a futuristic romance, a subgenre that combined elements of romance novels and science fiction. The novel was a "classic road trip romance" which just happened to be set in a separate galaxy. In 1987 she published a second futuristic romance, Crystal Flame, which again allowed for a "traditional romance plot unfold[ing] in an extraordinary world". The success of these books encouraged Krentz to try to write a real historical romance with a humorous twist, which she released under the pseudonym Amanda Quick.

She began writing paranormal futuristic novels of romantic suspense in 1996. Released under her maiden name, Jayne Castle, these novels are set far in the future in a world where everyone has a psychic talent and respectable people use marriage agencies instead of choosing their own mates. As is customary in her writing, in each case the protagonists have a mystery to solve or a villain to defeat.

Psychic themes appear throughout Krentz's work. In 2006 she began a new series, called The Arcane Society, which includes books written as Amanda Quick (historical setting), Jayne Ann Krentz (contemporary setting), and Jayne Castle (futuristic setting). The books tell the stories of members of the Arcane Society for the psychically gifted, and each hero and heroine has his or her own psychic power. The books feature a mystery for the protagonists to solve while they are learning to deal with their psychic abilities. The heroes of her novels are always alpha males who are as strong and determined as her heroines.

==== Recognition ====
More than 120 of Krentz's romance novels have been published, with 32 placing on the New York Times Bestseller List. In total, there are over 23 million copies of her books in print.

Krentz's novel The Waiting Game was adapted for the Harlequin Romance Series teleplay in 2001.

Her books have won many awards. Krentz has been nominated 22 times for Romantic Times Reviewers' Choice Awards, winning in 1995 for Trust Me and in 2004 for Falling Awake. She has also received a Romantic Times Career Achievement Award.

An outspoken advocate of the merits of romantic fiction, Krentz maintains that "[p]opular fiction encapsulates and reinforces many of our most fundamental cultural values. Romance is among the most enduring because it addresses the values of family and human emotional bonds." To help educate the public about the genre she became the editor of and a contributor to Dangerous Men and Adventurous Women: Romance Writers on the Appeal of the Romance, a non-fiction essay collection that won the prestigious Susan Koppelman Award for Feminist Studies. Krentz was the inspiration for, and first recipient of, the Romantic Times Jane Austen Award, created to "honor those in the romance community who have significantly impacted our genre".
