= Caizi jiaren =

Genre of Chinese fiction

Title page of the novel Ping Shan Leng Yan

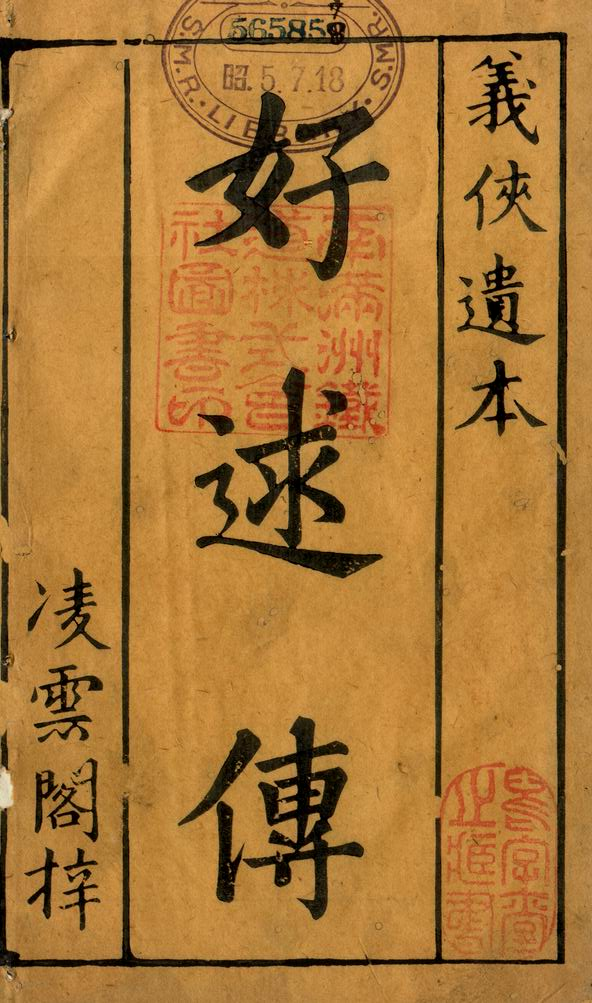
Title page of the novel Haoqiu zhuan

Caizi jiaren (Chinese: 才子佳人; pinyin: cáizǐ jiārén; Wade–Giles: Ts'ai-tzu chia-jen; lit. 'scholar–beauty' or "scholar and beauty") (Note: Some of the other English translations for caizi jiaren include "Talent and Beauty" and "Genius and Beauty".) is a genre of Chinese fiction typically involving a romance between a young scholar and a beautiful girl. The genre was highly popular during the late Ming dynasty and early Qing dynasty.

== History ==
Three Tang dynasty works "particularly influential in the development of the caizi-jiaren model" were Yingying's Biography, The Tale of Li Wa, and Huo Xiaoyu zhuan (霍小玉傳, "The story of Huo Xiaoyu"). The Yuan dynasty novella Jiao Hong ji, and other zaju plays were also one of the genre's main influences. Song Geng writes that Iu-Kiao-Li (Yu Jiao Li) was "one of the best-known caizi-jiaren novels". Chloë F. Starr adds that among the best known were Iu-Kiao-Li, Ping Shan Leng Yan, and Haoqiu zhuan.

Elements of this theme are also common in Chinese opera, such as Romance of the Western Chamber, which uses the term caizi jiaren in its text, and The Peony Pavilion. In both of these operas, lovers elope, have secret trysts, or were perfect matches in spite of parental disapproval. But the genre finally achieved an independent cultural and historical identity in the early Qing, when writers began to use the term caizi jiaren for a group of vernacular novels with twenty or so chapters which had formulaic or standard characters and plots. The mid-18th century novel Dream of the Red Chamber criticized them, and literati dismissed them as inferior and obscene. By the 18th century, the genre had developed variety as the scholar and the beauty shared the action with fantasy and various other elements (such as judges and courtrooms, monks and nuns, brothels, and illicit assignations, etc.).

== Plot characteristics ==
Hu Wanchuan (simplified Chinese: 胡万川; traditional Chinese: 胡萬川; pinyin: Hú Wànchuān) writes that the typical caizi jiaren plot is a love story between a beautiful girl and a handsome scholar, both of whose families are socially distinguished and both of whom have an aptitude for poetry and prose. Usually, each of the protagonists is an only child and oftentimes, at least one parent is dead. Song Geng comments that by having one or more of the parents dead, the number of characters is reduced, and "this plotline may also serve to emphasize the extraordinary value and peerless perfection of the scholar and beauty".

The story, Hu Wanchuan continues, characteristically opens with an unexpected meeting between the two and love at first sight. The woman often has a discerning female servant who serves as a matchmaker and mediates between the lovers. The plot then deals with obstacles to the marriage. These obstacles often consist of the scholar not having an official rank and the father or mother of the girl opposing the marriage. Often, the story ends when the young scholar passes the imperial examinations and the couple is united. Most caizi jiaren stories have happy endings.

Keith McMahon comments that the lovers in caizi jiaren stories of the early Qing "are like stereotyped opposites of the characters in earlier works". The love of the scholar and the beauty "sharply contrasts" with depictions in late Ming fiction, where love is erotic rather than spiritual. In the caizi jiaren novel, "sentiment replaces libido" and "refined, internal feelings replace vulgar, external sensations".

One characteristic of the early Qing works is the mutual respect between the sexes. The men do not condescend to the women, and in many cases, the talented and independent young woman is the equal of her male lover. Since she is often an only child who has been cherished and educated by her father as if she were a boy, she skillfully helps her father and lover out of difficulty. She sometimes even dresses as a male. One beauty states her motto as "though in body I am a woman, in ambition I surpass men" and one father says of such a daughter that she is worth ten sons. Their roles and personalities are so similar that in many instances, the woman dresses as a man. Yet the relation is not entirely equal. To dress as a male, for instance, represents upward mobility, but there are only few instances of men dressing as women, except to seduce women or to seek homosexual encounters. Nor is there necessarily equality in the number of partners, since in a number of later novels, the man takes more than one wife or has a series of lovers. In the end, what the beauty wants is to choose a man who is worthy of her.

Illustrations from the novel Bai Gui Zhi

=== Grand Reunion finale ===
One of the most influential literary tropes found in these caizi jiaren romantic novels, is a "Grand Reunion" ("da tuan yuan" 大團圓 or 多重圓滿) finale, where often everyone, including the secondary and side characters (loyal servants, goofy sidekicks, friends, reconciled family members, etc., i.e. the "found family" of the main "scholar and beauty" couple), and sometimes even "rival lovers" and antagonists, find their own happy endings (皆大歡喜) or love interests at the end; thus the storyline ends in a comprehensive and inclusive "multi-happy endings" where all the threads converge. This "addictive" literary device, where there are many "perfect matches" and no one is left out, is still very common in modern East Asian dramas and films.

== Characters ==
In addition to physical beauty, the two main characters both (especially the girl) also possess many other positive characteristics, such as literary talent, noble birth, virtue, and chastity. The preface of Iu-kiao-li: or, the Two Fair Cousins (Yu Jiao Li) states that "The young man is as beautiful as the girl while the girl is as brilliant as the young man" (郎兼女色，女擅郎才).

Pseudo-caizi, who pretend to be caizi, are foils to the real caizi in caizi jiaren stories.

== Influence and reception ==
Caizi jiaren novels played a pivotal role in literary history, with works such as Haoqiu zhuan and Iu-Kiao-Li being some of the earliest translated novels in the English language, and some even became bestsellers in Europe. These novels especially made an impact in Europe around the mid-eighteenth and early nineteenth centuries.

Although these caizi jiaren novels would carry on the whimsical elements of chuanqi fiction and reach an even wider audience than ever before, they were not always appreciated and well-respected in China; literati and Confucian intellectuals dismissed them as being vulgar (hence, they were often published under a pseudonym) and as "light-hearted romantic comedies", and in the early 20th-century, modern progressive writers also criticized these novels as being frivolous and escapist. Starr wrote that the novels of the genre "encountered a critical silence similar to that occluding red-light novels, though for apparently more 'objective' aesthetic reasons, after the genre was dismissed for its lack of imagination".

The critical reception of these novels, however, saw a new light in the latter half of the 20th century and into the 21st century, when new scholarship on the subject began to appear in China and in the West. Scholars noted the playfulness of the writings, as well as the dynamic portrayal of the sexes and of the gender roles, and the dominance of the clever and resourceful female protagonists in these novels.

Further, Song wrote that "although the masterpiece Honglou meng [Dream of the Red Chamber] cannot be regarded as a caizi-jiaren novel as such, there is little controversy about the influence of the caizi-jiaren characterization and theme on it". Robert E. Hegel, in his review of The Chinese Novel at the Turn of the Century, wrote that Jean Duval's description of The Nine-tailed Turtle "makes the novel seem indebted to Haoqiu zhuan 好逑傳 and perhaps other works of the earlier caizi jiaren romantic tradition". Hegel elsewhere stated that The Carnal Prayer Mat (Rou putuan) was intended to satirize the imperial examination system and parody the patterns in caizi jiaren novels.

These caizi jiaren romantic novels were also widely adapted in Eastern Asia. The novel Jin Yun Qiao, for example, would go on to be adapted into Vietnamese by Nguyễn Du as The Tale of Kieu (1820) and would be adapted into Japanese by Takizawa Bakin as Fūzoku kingyoden (風俗金魚伝, 1839). Takizawa Bakin also adapted Haoqiu zhuan as Kaikan kyōki kyōkakuden (1832).

In Joseon and Tokugawa shogunate, caizi jiaren novels became the fashionable trend with the upper class and elite women, and had a profound impact on the love stories, romantic aesthetics and beauty standards that emerged in these countries.
