= Mikha'il Sabbagh =

Mikha'il Niqula al-Sabbagh (also known as Michel Sabbagh; 1775–1816) was a French–Arabic translator and author known for his French manual on the vernacular Arabic of Syria and Egypt, his French translation of an 18th-century manuscript of One Thousand and One Nights, and his chronicle of Daher al-Umar, the ruler of northern Palestine in the 18th century.

== Early life ==
Mikha'il was born in Acre in 1775, when the city was transitioning from its quarter-century-long rule by the local sheikh Daher al-Umar to the nearly two-decade-long governorship of the Ottoman-appointed Ahmad Pasha al-Jazzar. His European biographers generally cite a later date of birth in 1784. Mikha'il belonged to a prominent family of Melkite (Greek Catholic) Arab Christians, his grandfather being Ibrahim al-Sabbagh, Daher al-Umar's influential chief minister; Ibrahim was executed by the Ottomans in the aftermath of Daher's fall. Mikha'il's father, Niqula, was a physician. Other contemporary members of the Sabbaghs, Sam'an and Antun, were educated in Rome and authored and translated religious literature in Arabic. In the early 1790s, Mikha'il studied Arabic in Damascus, then in Egypt. He returned to Syria in 1794.

After Napoleon's failed siege of Acre in 1799, Mikha'il and other Melkite scholars withdrew with Napoleon's army from Palestine to French-occupied Egypt. During this time in Egypt, he became acquainted with an Arabic interpreter of Napoleon from Asyut, Ellious Bocthor (Alyus Buqtur; 1784–1821). Through Bocthor, Mikha'il gained employment as a secretary with the French general Jean Reynier. When the French withdrew from Egypt in 1801, both Mikha'il and Bocthor accompanied them, wary of punitive measures by the Ottomans for their involvement with the French.

== Translator in Paris ==
In Paris, Mikha'il became acquainted with notable scholars of Oriental studies, including Silvestre de Sacy and Louis-Mathieu Langlès. These scholars had been training a crop of translators for the French state from the end of the 18th century. De Sacy, chair of Arabic studies in France's emerging Oriental language school, appointed Mikha'il the Arabic printer and editor of the Imprimerie royale. Afterward, he became the scribe of Arabic manuscripts of the Bibliothèque du Roi. De Sacy, Langles and the French students of Arabic often sought Mikha'il's advice when they encountered difficulty with the language and he developed a reputation for his knowledge and as a professional scribe. In particular, he became an authority of the vernacular Arabic of Syria and Egypt. On Bocthor's advice, Mikha'il penned a manual on the subject, at the introduction of which he explained that the classical Arabic foreign scholars typically learned was of little use when interacting with ordinary Arabs, allowing them only to recognize an occasional word or syllable.

In the 1800s, Mikha'il transcribed a manuscript of One Thousand and One Nights written in Baghdad in 1703. According to Muhsin Mahdi, Mikha'il's transcription "bore his characteristic marks: a small script, careful copying with close attention to detail, including the marginal notations by the original manuscript's scribe and readers". Mikha'il's manuscript was more comprehensive and complete than its French predecessors or contemporaries and "excercised enormous influence on the subsequent history of the Nights, not only in Europe, but as far East as British India", according to Mahdi. Mikha'il died in Paris in 1816. His manuscript was the possession of the French Arabist Caussin de Perceval, for whom it was transcribed. It remained in de Perceval's family at least until 1827, when his son Armand-Pierre loaned it to Heinrich Fleischer, a prominent professor of Arabic in Leipzig. Around 1888, it was sold to Hermann Zotenberg for the Bibliothèque nationale, who determined it was "faithfully reproduced" from the Baghdad original, which had since become lost.

== Chronicle of Daher al-Umar ==
Mikha'il penned one of the two near contemporary Arabic manuscripts devoted to Daher al-Umar's life, the other by his relative Abbud al-Sabbagh. The date of Mikha'il's manuscript was unknown, though the historian Thomas Philipp deems it was written "some twenty-five years" after Daher's death in 1775. A copy is stored in Saint Joseph University of Beirut and another in the Staatsbibliothek in Munich. It was titled Taʿrīkh al-Shaykh Ẓāhir al-ʿUmar az-Zaydānī ḥākim ʿAkkā wa-bilād Ṣafad [The History of Sheikh Daher al-Umar al-Zaydani, ruler of Acre and the Galilee]. According to Philipp's assessment of the work, Mikha'il "had a great sense for the anecdotal detail but a complete disregard for chronological sequence and was more concerned with the good image" of Daher and his grandfather Ibrahim al-Sabbagh. He wrote a separate biography of the latter, appended to Daher's biography. Although Mikha'il's and Abbud's biographies present a favorable picture of Daher, Mikha'il's work is generally regarded as more "apologetic".

== Bibliography ==
- Cohen, Amnon (1973). Palestine in the 18th Century: Patterns of Government and Administration. Jerusalem: The Magnes Press. ISBN 978-0-19-647903-3.
- Joudah, Ahmad Hasan (2013) [1987]. Revolt in Palestine in the Eighteenth Century: The Era of Shaykh Zahir al-Umar (Second ed.). Piscataway, New Jersey: Gorgias Press. ISBN 978-1-4632-0002-2.
- Mahdi, Muhsin (1994). The Thousand and One Nights (alf layla wa layla): From the Earliest Known Sources: Part 3, Introduction and Indexes. Leiden, New York and Köln: Brill. ISBN 90-04-10106-3.
- Philipp, Thomas (2001). Acre: The Rise and Fall of a Palestinian City, 1730–1831. Columbia University Press. ISBN 978-0-231-50603-8.
