= Caussin =

Caussin may refer to:

- Armand-Pierre Caussin de Perceval (1795–1871), French orientalist
- Arnold Caussin (c.1505–c.1558), Flemish composer and choirmaster
- Jean-Jacques-Antoine Caussin de Perceval, (1759–1835), French orientalist, father of the previous one
- Mike Caussin (born 1987), American football player
- Nicolas Caussin, French Jesuit (1583–1651)
