= Baylak al-Qibjaki =

Egyptian writer

Baylak Al-Qibjāqī or Bailak ibn Muhammad al-Qabajaqi (fl. 1240-1282) was an Egyptian scholar known from the Arabic work Kitab Kanz al-tujjar fi ma'rifat al-ahjar (c. 1282) which translates as "Treasure of the Merchants on the Knowledge of Minerals". The book was dedicated to al-Malik al-Muzaffar II and suggests that the author served in the court of the ruler of Hamah. The book is one of the earliest Arabic treatises that mention the use of floating magnetic compasses for navigation. He described the use of a needle floating on water which was used aboard a ship between Tripoli and Alexandria. The book was translated into French by Julius Klaproth and later by Clement Mullet in 1868.
