= Al-Maqrizi =

Egyptian Arab historian (1364–1442)

al-Maqrīzī (المقريزي)

Personal life
- Born: Taqī al-Dīn Abū al-Abbās Aḥmad ibn 'Alī ibn 'Abd al-Qadir ibn Muḥammad al-Maqrīzī (تقى الدين أحمد بن على بن عبد القادر بن محمد المقريزى); 1364 Cairo, Mamluk Sultanate
- Died: 1442 (aged 77–78)
- Notable work: Al-Mawa'iz wa al-I'tibar
- Occupation: Historian, biographer, writer

Religious life
- Religion: Islam
- Denomination: Sunni
- Jurisprudence: Shafi'i

Muslim leader
- Influenced by: Abu Hanifa; Al-Shafi'i; Dawud al-Zahiri; Ibn Khaldun

Al-Maqrīzī (Arabic: المقريزي, full name Taqī al-Dīn Abū al-'Abbās Aḥmad ibn 'Alī ibn 'Abd al-Qādir ibn Muḥammad al-Maqrīzī, تقي الدين أحمد بن علي بن عبد القادر بن محمد المقريزي; 1364–1442) was a medieval Egyptian historian and biographer during the Mamluk era, known for his interest in the Fatimid era, and the earlier periods of Egyptian history. He is recognized as the most influential historian of premodern Egypt.

== Life ==
A direct student of Ibn Khaldun, al-Maqrīzī was born in Cairo to a family of Syrian origin that had recently relocated from Damascus. When he presents himself in his books he usually stops at the 10th forefather although he confessed to some of his close friends that he can trace his ancestry to al-Mu‘izz li-Dīn Allāh – first Fatimid caliph in Egypt and the founder of al-Qahirah (Cairo) (the victorious) – and even to Ali ibn Abi Talib. He was trained in the Hanafite school of law. Later, he switched to the Shafi'ite school and finally to the Zahirite school. Maqrizi studied theology under one of the primary masterminds behind the Zahiri Revolt, and his vocal support and sympathy with that revolt against the Mamluks likely cost him higher administrative and clerical positions with the Mamluk regime. The name Maqrizi was an attribution to a quarter of the city of Baalbek, from where his paternal grandparents hailed. Maqrizi confessed to his contemporaries that he believed that he was related to the Fatimids through the son of al-Muizz. Ibn Hajar preserves the most memorable account: his father, as they entered the al-Hakim Mosque one day, told him "My son, you are entering the mosque of your ancestor." However, his father also instructed al-Maqrizi not to reveal this information to anyone he could not trust; Walker concludes:

Ultimately it would be hard to conclude that al-Maqrizi conceived any more than an antiquarian interest in the Fatimids. His main concern seems more likely to be the meaning they and their city might have for the present, that is, for Mamluk Egypt and its role in Islam. (p. 167)

In 1385, he went on the Islamic pilgrimage, the Hajj. For some time he was secretary in a government office, and in 1399 became inspector of markets for Cairo and northern Egypt. This post he soon gave up to become a preacher at the Mosque of 'Amr ibn al 'As, president of the al-Hakim Mosque, and a lecturer on tradition. In 1408, he went to Damascus to become inspector of the Qalanisryya and lecturer. Later, he retired into private life at Cairo.

In 1430, he again went on Hajj with his family and travelled for some five years. His learning was great, his observation accurate and his judgement good, but his books are largely compilations, and he does not always acknowledge the sources upon which he relied.

== Works ==
Most of al-Maqrizi's works, exceeding 200, are concerned with Egypt.

- al-Mawāʻiẓ wa-al-Iʻtibār bi-Dhikr al-Khiṭaṭ wa-al-āthār (Arabic, 2 vols., Bulaq, 1853) (Note: Volume 2 title: al-Juzʾ al-thānī min Kitāb al-khiṭaṭ wa-al-āthār fī Miṣr wa-al-Qāhirah wa-al-Nīl wa-mā yataʻalliqu bihā. Edited by Muḥammad ibn ʻAbd al-Raḥmān Quṭṭah al-ʻAdawī. f. colophon. www.catalog.hathitrust.org); French translation by Urbain Bouriant as Description topographique et historique de l'Égypte (Paris, 1895–1900; compare A. R. Guest, "A List of Writers, Books and other Authorities mentioned by El Maqrizi in his Khitat," in Journal of the Royal Asiatic Society, 1902, pp. 103–125).
- Itti‘āz al-Ḥunafā’ bi-Akhbār al-A’immah al-Fāṭimīyīn al-Khulafā’
- Kitāb al-Khiṭaṭ al-Maqrīzīyah
- Kitāb al-Sulūk li-Ma‘rifat Duwal al-Mulūk
- History of the Fatimites; extract published by J.G.L. Kosegarten in Chrestomathia (Leipzig, 1828), pp. 115–123;
- History of the Ayyubit and Mameluke Rulers; French translation by Etienne Marc Quatremère (2 vols., Paris, 1837–1845).
- Muqaffa, first sixteen-volumes of an Egyptian biographic encyclopedia arranged in alphabetic order. The Egyptian historian, al-Sakhawi, estimated that the complete work would require eighty volumes. Three autograph volumes exist in manuscript in Leiden and one in Paris.

=== Smaller works ===
- Mahomeddan Coinage (ed. O. G. Tychsen, Rostock, 1797; French translation by Silvestre de Sacy, Paris, 1797)
- Arab Weights and Measures (ed. Tychsen, Rostock, 1800)
- Arabian Tribes that migrated to Egypt (ed. F. Wüstenfeld, Göttingen, 1847)
- Account of Hadhramaut (ed. P. B. Noskowyj, Bonn, 1866)
- Strife between the Bani Umayya and the Bani Hashim (ed. G. Vos, Leiden, 1888)
- Historia Regum Islamiticorum in Abyssinia (ed. and Latin trans. F. T. Rinck, Leiden, 1790).

=== Books ===
- al-Mawa'iz wa al-'i'tibar bi dhikr al-khitat wa al-'athar (about the planning of Cairo and its monuments)
  - A. R. Guest, p. 103ff: A list of Writers, Books and other Authorities mentioned by El Maqrisi in his Khitat
- al-Selouk Leme'refatt Dewall al-Melouk (about Mamluk history in Egypt)
- Ette'aaz al-honafa be Akhbaar al-A'emma al-Fatemeyyeen al-Kholafaa (about the Fatimid state)
- al-Bayaan wal E'raab Amma Be Ard Misr min al A'raab (about the Arab Tribes in Egypt)
- Eghathatt al-Omma be Kashf al-Ghomma (about the famines that took place in Egypt)
- al-Muqaffa (biographies of princes and prominent personality of his time)
- Maqrīzī, Aḥmad ibn ʻAlī (1824). Hamaker, Hendrik Arent (ed.). Takyoddini Ahmedis al-Makrizii Narratio de Expeditionibus a Graecis Francisque Adversus Dimyatham, AB A. C. 708 AD 1221 Susceptis (in Arabic and Latin). Amstelodami: Pieper & Ipenbuur.
- Kosegarten, J. G. L. (1828). Chrestomathia Arabica ex codicibus manuscriptis Parisiensibus, Gothanis et Berolinensibus collecta atque tum adscriptis vocalibus (in Latin). Lipsiae: Sumtu F. C. G. Vogelii. (pp. 115 −123: Al-Maqrizi, an extract of History of the Fatimites.)
- al-Maqrizi (1840). Histoire des sultans mamlouks, de l'Égypte, écrite en arabe (in French and Latin). Vol. 1, part 1. Translator: Étienne Marc Quatremère. Paris: Oriental Translation Fund of Great Britain and Ireland.
- al-Maqrizi (1845). Histoire des sultans mamlouks, de l'Égypte, écrite en arabe (in French and Latin). Vol. 1, part 2. Translator: Étienne Marc Quatremère. Paris: Oriental Translation Fund of Great Britain and Ireland.
- al-Maqrizi (1845). Histoire des sultans mamlouks, de l'Égypte, écrite en arabe (in French and Latin). Vol. 2. Translator: Étienne Marc Quatremère. Paris: Oriental Translation Fund of Great Britain and Ireland.
- al-Maqrizi (1853). Kitb al-mawi wa-al-itibr bi-dhikr al-khia wa-al-thr : yakhtau dhlika bi-akhbr iqlm Mir wa-al-Nl wa-dhikr al-Qhirah wa-m yataallaqu bi-h wa-bi-iqlmih (in Arabic). Vol. 1. al-Qhirah: Maktabat al-Thaqfah al-Dnyah.
- al-Maqrizi (1853). Kitb al-mawi wa-al-itibr bi-dhikr al-khia wa-al-thr : yakhtau dhlika bi-akhbr iqlm Mir wa-al-Nl wa-dhikr al-Qhirah wa-m yataallaqu bi-h wa-bi-iqlmih (in Arabic). Vol. 2. al-Qhirah: Maktabat al-Thaqfah al-Dnyah.
- A. R. Guest, 1902, in Journal of the Royal Asiatic Society, pp. 103–125: "A List of Writers, Books and other Authorities mentioned by El Maqrizi in his Khitat" (Notes on the 1853-edition)
- al-Maqrizi (1895). Mémoires publiés par les membres de la Mission archéologique Française au Caire: Description topographique et historique de l'Égypte (in French). Vol. 17. Translator: Urbain Bouriant. Cairo: Mémoires publiés par les membres de la Mission archéologique.
- al-Maqrizi (1948). Jamāl al-Dīn al-Shayyāl (ed.). Itti'āz al-Ḥunafā' bi-Akhbār al-A'immah al-Fāṭimīyīn al-Khulafā'. Cairo: Dār al-Fikr al-‘Arabī.
- al-Maqrizi (1908) [1906]. Kitāb al-Khiṭaṭ al-Maqrīzīyah. Vol. 4. Cairo: Al-Nil Press.
- al-Maqrizi (1956). Muḥammad Muṣṭafā Ziada (al-Ziyādah) (ed.). Kitāb al-Sulūk li-Ma'rifat Duwal al-Mulūk. Vol. 3. Cairo: Lajnat al-Ta’līf.
  - alternative: al-Maqrizi (1895). Mémoires publiés par les membres de la Mission archéologique Française au Caire: Description topographique et historique de l'Égypte (in French). Vol. 17. Translator: Urbain Bouriant. Cairo: Mémoires publiés par les membres de la Mission archéologique.

== See also ==
- List of Muslim historians
- List of Arab scientists and scholars
- Ibn Inabah
