= Louis-Mathieu Langlès =

French academic, philologist, linguist, translator, author, librarian and orientalist

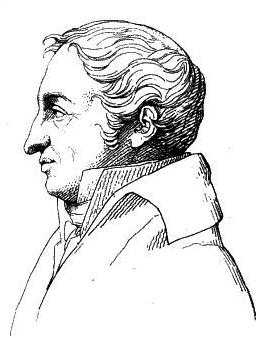
Louis-Mathieu Langlès

Louis-Mathieu Langlès (23 August 1763 – 28 January 1824) was a French academic, philologist, linguist, translator, author, librarian and orientalist. He was the conservator of the oriental manuscripts at the Bibliothèque Nationale in Napoleonic France and he held the same position at the renamed Bibliothèque du Roi after the fall of the empire.

== Early life ==
Langlès was born in 1763 in Pérennes, a section of the commune of Welles-Pérennes in the department of the Oise. His youthful efforts to obtain a military position were unsuccessful. Instead, he went to Paris where he enrolled at the Collège de France, studying Arabic and Persian.

== Scholarly career ==
Along with Antoine Léonard de Chézy (1773–1832), Jean-François Champollion (1790–1832) and Jean-Pierre Abel-Rémusat (1788–1832), Langlès was a pupil and protégé of Silvestre de Sacy (1758–1838). Langlès's close links with the Collège de France were enhanced by Baron de Sacy's support, which also resulted in Chézy becoming the Collège's first Professor of Sanskrit, Rémusat becoming its first Professor of Chinese, and Champollion becoming its first Professor of Egyptology. The faculty encompassed Langlès as the college's Professor of Persian.

In 1785, he was attached to the Tribunal of the Marshals of France, which was at that time charged with suppressing duels.

In 1795, Langlès became the founder-director the Ecole des langues orientales vivantes in Paris, which is still operating under the revised name of Institut national des langues et civilisations orientales (INALCO).

Langlès was the provisional specialist on India at the Bibliothèque Nationale. France became a center for Indian studies when the accumulated Indian manuscripts languishing in the Bibliothèque Nationale began to be inventoried.

Langlès corresponded with William Jones in Calcutta; and he was responsible for including the history and bibliography of the early publications of the Asiatic Society of Bengal in the third volume of the Magasin Encyclopédique.

The 1811 edition of Jean Chardin's Voyages de monsieur le chevalier Chardin en Perse et autres lieux de l'Orient (The Travels of Sir John Chardin in Persia and the Orient), was edited by Langlès. This is still today considered the standard version of Chardin's work. In 1819, he was elected to the American Philosophical Society in Philadelphia.

He died in Paris at the age of 81. His remains are interred in Père-Lachaise cemetery.

== Honors and awards ==
- Institut de France, Chevalier.
- Académie des inscriptions et belles-lettres (Academy of Humanities)
- Légion d'honneur.
- Royal Asiatic Society, United Kingdom.
- Asiatic Society of Bengal
- Order of St. Vladimir, Russia.

== Selected works ==
- 1787 – Political and Military Institutions of Tamerlane.
- 1788 – History of the Mahrattas.
- 1790 – Alphabet Tartare Manchou.
- 1790 – Tartare Manchou Française.

== See also ==
- Isaac Titsingh
- Chrétien-Louis-Joseph de Guignes
- Mikha'il Sabbagh
