= Étienne Marc Quatremère =

French orientalist (1782–1857)

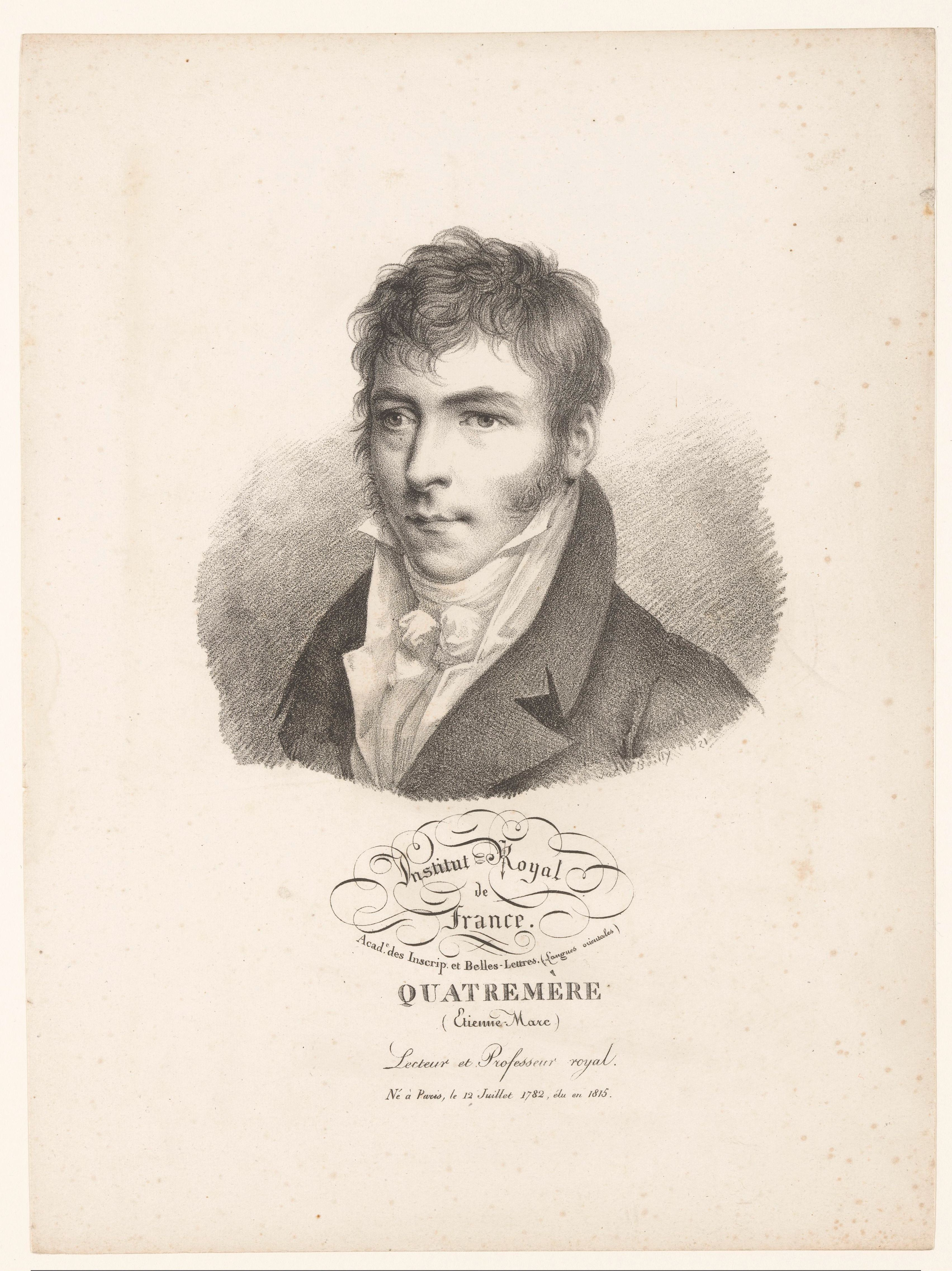
Portrait of Étienne Marc Quatremère (1821)

Étienne Marc Quatremère (12 July 1782, Paris – 18 September 1857, Paris) was a French Orientalist.

== Biography ==
Born into a Jansenist family, Étienne and his mother, who knew Latin, had to go into hiding in the countryside when his father, a clothing merchant made a member of the French nobility by king Louis XV with the mention by the king to continue in his trading and shop keeping however, was executed in 1793 during the French Revolution. Later he studied Arabic under Silvestre de Sacy, (1758–1838), a member of the French nobility since 1813 and the son of a public notary with Jewish roots, becoming later a rector at the University of Paris, in the School of Living Oriental Languages.

Employed in 1807 in the manuscript department of the imperial library, he passed to the chair of Greek in the university of Rouen in 1809, entered the Academy of Inscriptions in 1815, taught Hebrew and Aramaic in the Collège de France from 1819, and finally in 1838 became professor of Persian in the School of Living Oriental Languages, on the death of Silvestre de Sacy.

Quatremère's first work was Recherches ... sur la langue et la littérature de l'Egypte (1808), showing that the language of ancient Egypt must be sought in Coptic.

His Mémoires géographiques et historiques sur l'Égypte… sur quelques contrées voisines was published in 1811. This publication forced Jean-François Champollion, the famous decoder of the Rosetta Stone, to publish, prematurely, an "Introduction" to his L'Égypte sous les pharaons. Since both works concern the Coptic names of Egyptian towns, and Champollion's was published later, Champollion was accused by some of plagiarism. In fact "neither he nor Quatremère had copied from one another, and very obvious differences of approach were apparent in their publications".

Quatremère edited and translated part of Al-Maqrizi's, (1364–1442), Arabic History of the Memaluke Sultans (2 vols., 1837–41), "not because he had all that much interest in the history of Mamluk Egypt, but rather because he was fascinated by the vocabulary of fifteenth-century Arabic and particularly in those lexicographic nuggets that had not been defined in the standard of Arabic dictionaries".

He published among other works Mémoires sur les Nabatéens (1835); a translation of Rashid-al-Din Hamadani's, (1247–1318), Histoire des Mongols de la Perse (1836); Mémoire géographique et historique sur l'Egypte (1810); the text of Ibn Khaldun's (1332–1406) Prolegomena; and a vast number of useful memoirs in the Journal asiatique. His numerous reviews in the Journal des savants are also worth mention.

Quatremère made great lexicographic collections in Oriental languages, fragments of which appear in the notes to his various works. His manuscript material for Syriac was utilized in Robert Payne Smith's Thesaurus; of the slips he collected for a projected Arabic, Persian and Turkish lexicon some account is given in the preface to Dozy, Supplément aux dictionnaires arabes. They were acquired by the Munich Court Library in 1858 and are now being held by its successor, the Bavarian State Library.

A biographical notice by Barthélemy Sainte-Hilaire is prefixed to Quatremère's Mélanges d'histoire et de philologie orientale (1861). Quatremère's grave is in the 32nd division of the Père Lachaise Cemetery of Paris.

== Sources ==
- Lesley & Roy Adkins (2000). The Keys of Egypt. London: HarperCollins.
- Robert Graham Irwin (2006). For Lust of Knowing. London: Allen Lane.
