= Urbain Bouriant =

French egyptologist (1849–1903)

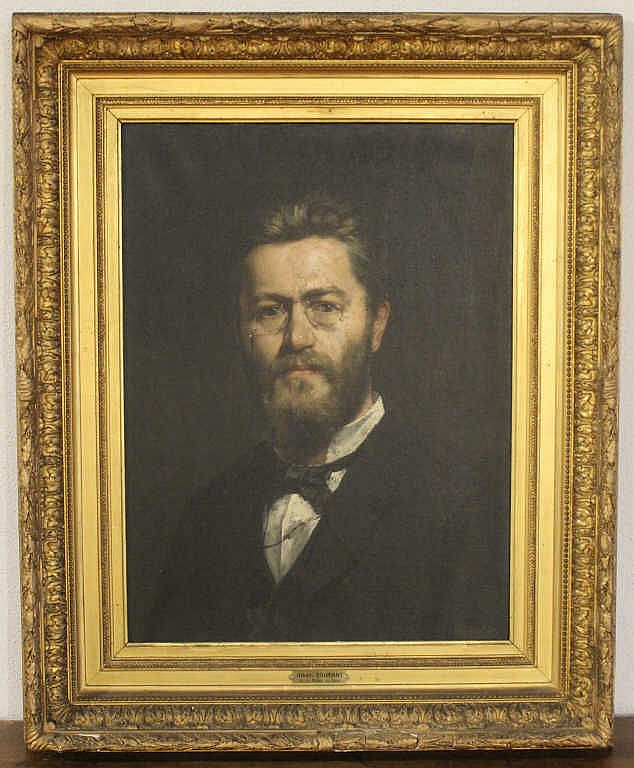
Urbain Bouriant

Urbain Bouriant (11 April 1849 – 19 June 1903) was a French Egyptologist, who discovered the Gospel of Peter in a tomb at Akhmim. He is best known from his translation of Al-Maqrizi, published as Description topographique et historique de l'Egypte (Paris 1895-1900). He was the collaborator of Gaston Maspero in 1880, when Maspero founded the French archaeological mission to Cairo, precursor of the Institut français d'archéologie orientale (IFAO).

From 1883 to December 1886, he was a curator at the museum of Bulaq, then director of IFAO until 1898. In the season of 1883-84, Bouriant discovered the copy of the Great Hymn to the Aten, in the tomb of Ay at Amarna.
