= Antoine Isaac Silvestre de Sacy =

French linguist and orientalist (1758–1838)

Antoine Isaac, Baron Silvestre de Sacy
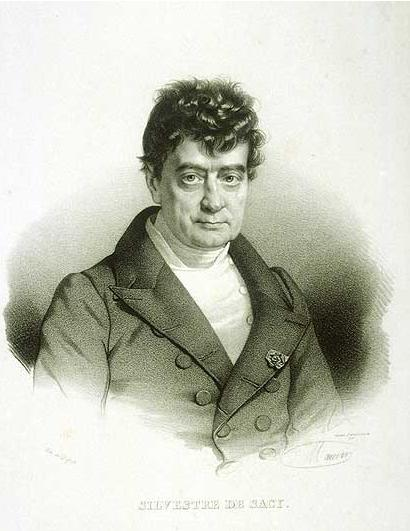
- Antoine Isaac, Baron Silvestre de Sacy
- Born: 21 September 1758; Paris, Kingdom of France
- Died: 21 February 1838 (aged 79); Paris, France
- Occupations: Linguist, Orientalist, councillor

Antoine Isaac, Baron Silvestre de Sacy (French: [sasi]; 21 September 1758 – 21 February 1838), was a French nobleman, linguist and orientalist. His son, Ustazade Silvestre de Sacy, became a journalist.

== Life and works ==
=== Early life ===
Silvestre de Sacy was born in Paris to a notary named Jacques Abraham Silvestre, a Jansenist. He was born into an ardently Catholic bourgeois family, composed largely of notaires. The surname extension of "de Sacy" was added by the younger son after the name of Louis-Isaac Lemaistre de Sacy, a famous Jansenist cleric who lived in the 17th century. Sacy's father died when he was seven years old, and he was educated on his own by his mother.

Silvestre de Sacy was educated in a Benedictine abbey by private tutors. They taught him Arabic, Syriac, Chaldean, and Hebrew.

=== Philological studies ===
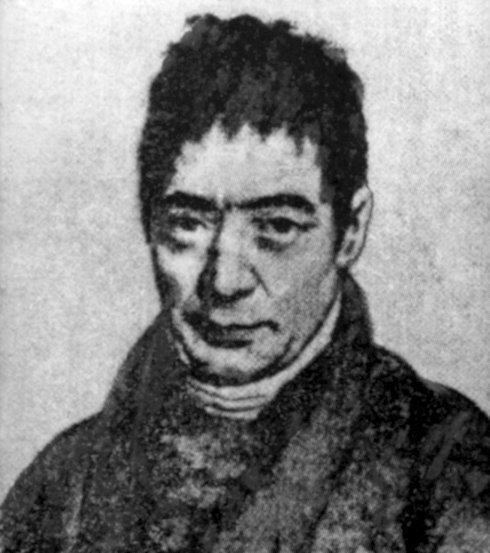
A portrait of Antoine Isaac Silvestre de Sacy

In 1781 he was appointed councillor in the cour des monnaies, and was promoted in 1791 to be a commissary-general in the same department. Having successively studied Semitic languages, he began to make a name as an orientalist, and between 1787 and 1791 deciphered the Pahlavi inscriptions of the Sassanid kings. In 1792 he retired from public service, and lived in close seclusion in a cottage near Paris till in 1795 he became the first and only professor of Arabic in the newly founded school of living Eastern languages (École speciale des langues orientales vivantes).

During this interval Sacy studied the religion of the Druze, the subject of his last and unfinished work, the Exposé de la religion des Druzes (2 vols., 1838). He published the following Arabic textbooks:

- Grammaire arabe (2 vols., 1st ed. 1810)
- Chrestomathie arabe (3 vols., 1806)
- Anthologie grammaticale (1829)

In 1806 he added the duties of Persian professor to his old chair, and from this time onwards his life was one of increasing honour and success, broken only by a brief period of retreat during the Hundred Days.

=== Public offices and memberships ===
He was perpetual secretary of the Academy of Inscriptions from 1832 onwards; in 1808 he had entered the corps législatif; he was created a baron of the French Empire by Napoleon in 1813; and in 1832, when quite an old man, he became a peer of France and regularly spoke in the Chamber of Peers (Chambre des Pairs). In 1815 he became rector of the University of Paris, and after the Second Restoration he was active on the commission of public instruction. With Abel Rémusat, he was joint founder of the Société asiatique, and was inspector of oriental typefaces at the Imprimerie nationale. In 1821 he was elected a member of the American Antiquarian Society

== Egyptian hieroglyphics research ==
Silvestre de Sacy was the first Frenchman to attempt to read the Rosetta Stone. He made some progress in identifying proper names in the demotic inscription.

From 1807 to 1809, Sacy was also a teacher of Jean-François Champollion, whom he encouraged in his research.

But later on, the relationship between the master and student became chilly. In no small measure, Champollion's Napoleonic sympathies were problematic for Sacy, who was decidedly Royalist in his political sympathies.

In 1811, Étienne Marc Quatremère, also a student of Sacy, published his Mémoires géographiques et historiques sur l'Égypte… sur quelques contrées voisines.

There was some rivalry between Champollion and Quatremère. Champollion published a paper in 1814 that covered some of the same territory. The allegations then arose that Champollion had plagiarized the work of Quatremère. Silvestre de Sacy seemed to take the side of Quatremère, according to Champollion.

There was also considerable rivalry between Champollion and Thomas Young, an English Egyptology researcher active in hieroglyphic decipherment. At first they cooperated in their work, but later, from around 1815, a chill arose between them. Again, Sacy took the side of Young.

Young started to correspond with Sacy, who advised Young not to share his work with Champollion and described Champollion as a charlatan. Consequently, Young avoided all direct contact with Champollion.

When Champollion submitted his Coptic grammar and dictionary for publication in 1815, de Sacy also opposed this.

Another student of Sacy was Johan David Åkerblad. He was a Swedish scholar who also contributed significantly to the investigation of the Rosetta Stone. Early on, in 1802, Åkerblad published his version of the Demotic alphabet; sixteen of these letters later proved to be correct and were used by Champollion, as well as by Young. Sacy felt that Akerblad was not getting enough credit for the good work that he was doing.

Thus, the decipherment of Egyptian hieroglyphics was being hampered by political and personal considerations. There were also big political rivalries between England and France at that time that also stood in the way of co-operation.

Nevertheless, when, in spite of all adversity, Champollion had made big progress in decipherment by 1822—resulting in his Lettre à M. Dacier—Sacy cast all politics aside and warmly welcomed the good work of his student.

== Other scholarly works ==
Among his other works are his edition of Hariri (1822), with a selected Arabic commentary, and of the Alfiya (1833), and his Calila et Dimna (1816), the Arabic version of the Panchatantra which has been in various forms one of the most popular books of the world. Other works include a version of Abd-el-Latif, Relation arabe sur l'Egypte, essays on the history of the law of property in Egypt since the Arab conquest (1805–1818), and The Book of Wandering Stars, a translation of a history of the Ottoman Empire and its rule of Egypt, particularly its recounting of the various actions of and events under the Ottoman governors of Egypt. To biblical criticism he contributed a memoir on the Samaritan Arabic Pentateuch (Mém. Acad. des Inscr. vol. xlix), and editions of the Arabic and Syriac New Testaments for the British and Foreign Bible Society.

His writing style was conversational and was addressed directly to students, acknowledging both himself and them within the text.

His approach to "Oriental" literature was that it was only worthy of publication in sets of selected extracts, not as complete texts. In doing so, he imbued his own perspective into the text. Edward Said has argued that this presented readers with a distorted understanding of the cultures Silvestre de Sacy claimed to depict.

== Critical studies ==
Edward Said and other modern scholars have given critical attention to the theoretical foundations of "orientalism" in works like Chrestomathie arabe.

== Notable students ==
In Edward Said's Orientalism, Sacy is described as "the teacher of nearly every major Orientalist in Europe, where his students dominated the field for about three-quarters of a century." Said also notes that several of Sacy's students were "politically useful" as part of French presence in Egypt following Napoleon's invasion.

- Jean-François Champollion, orientalist, translator of the Rosetta stone
- Étienne Marc Quatremère, a French orientalist who contributed to the research in Egyptian hieroglyphics.
- Johan David Åkerblad, a Swedish diplomat and orientalist; he contributed to the investigation of the Rosetta Stone.
- John Martin Augustine Scholz, Professor in Bonn
- Heinrich Leberecht Fleischer, Professor in Leipzig
- Johann Gottfried Ludwig Kosegarten, Professor in Jena and in Greifswald
- August Ferdinand Mehren, Professor in Copenhagen
- Justus Olshausen, Professor in Kiel
- Johann Gustav Stickel (1805–1896), Professor in Jena
- Carl Johan Tornberg (1807–77), Professor in Uppsala
- Louis-Mathieu Langlès, Curator, Bibliothèque Nationale
- Adam Franz Lennig, German Catholic theologian, and one of the most influential German priests of his day.
- Samuel Gobat, Anglican-Lutheran Bishop of Jerusalem

Silvestre de Sacy assisted the young composer Fromental Halévy in his early career, giving him a testimonial during his application for the Prix de Rome.

Sacy died in his native city of Paris, aged 79.

== Selected works ==
In a statistical overview derived from writings by and about Antoine Isaac Silvestre de Sacy, OCLC/WorldCat encompasses roughly 1,000+ works in 1,000+ publications in 16 languages and 3,000+ library holdings.

- Mémoires sur diverses antiquités de la Perse: et sur les médailles des rois de la dynastie des Sassanides; suivis de l'histoire de cette dynastie (1793)
- Principes de grammaire générale : mis à la portée des enfans, et propres à servir d'introduction à l'étude de toutes les langues (1799)
- Mémoire sur divers événements de l'histoire des Arabes avant Mahomet (1803)
- Chrestomathie arabe, ou, Extraits de divers écrivains arabes, tant en prose qu'en vers, avec une traduction française et des notes, à l'usage des élèves de l'École royale et spéciale des langues orientales vivantes (1806)
- Specimen historiae arabum by Bar Hebraeus (1806)
- Mémoire sur la dynastie des Assassins et sur l'origine de leur nom (1809)
- Grammaire arabe à l'usage des élèves de l'École spéciale des langues orientales vivantes (1810)
- Les séances de Hariri, publiées en arabe avec un commentaire choisi by Ḥarīrī (1822)
- Anthologie grammaticale arabe: ou, Morceaux choisis de divers grammairiens et scholiastes arabes, avec une traduction française et des notes; pouvant faire suite a la Chrestomathie arabe (1829)
- Grammaire arabe à l'usage des élèves de l'Ecole spéciale des langues orientales vivantes (1831)
- Exposé de la religion des druzes, tiré des livres religieux de cette secte, et précédé d'une introduction et de la Vie du khalife Hakem-biamr-Allah (1838)
- Les mille et une nuits; contes arabes (1839)
- Bibliothèque de M. le baron Silvestre de Sacy (1846)
- Mélanges de littérature orientale (1861)

== See also ==
- Mikha'il Sabbagh

== Sources ==
- Adkins, Lesley; Adkins, Roy (2000). The Keys of Egypt: The Obsession to Decipher Egyptian Hieroglyphs. Harper Collins Publishers. ISBN 0-06-019439-1.
