= Iu-Kiao-Li =

The opening of the novel (from chapter one)

Pages from an early printed edition of the novel, 1644-1661

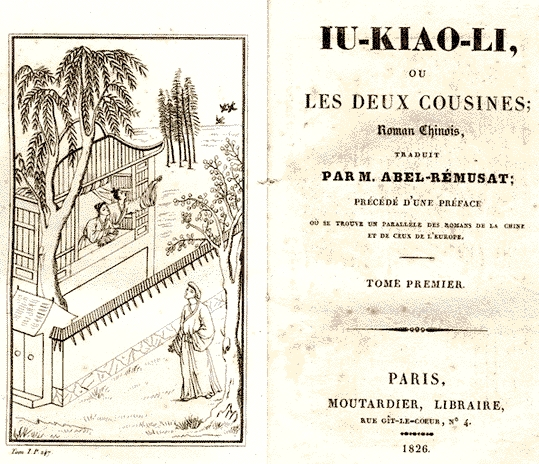
1826 French translation by Jean-Pierre-Abel Rémusat

1827 English translation published by Hunt and Clarke of London

Yu Jiao Li (simplified Chinese: 玉娇梨; traditional Chinese: 玉嬌梨; pinyin: Yù Jiāo Lí; Wade–Giles: Yü Chiao Li), known in the West as Iu-Kiao-Li: or, the Two Fair Cousins, is an early-Qing Chinese caizi jiaren ("scholar and beauty") novel by Zhang Yun (張勻).

Yu Jiao Li is one of the best-known caizi jiaren novels, together with Ping Shan Leng Yan, and Haoqiu zhuan. The English version published by Hunt and Clarke of London in 1827 is an adaptation of Jean-Pierre Abel-Rémusat's French translation.

The novel is about two cousins, Bai Hongyu and Lu Mengli, how they both fell in love with the handsome scholar Su Youbai.

== Characters ==
Two of the antagonist characters, Zhang Guiru (張軌如; 张轨如; Zhāng Guǐrú; Chang Kuei-ju) and Su Youde (蘇有德; 苏有德; Sū Yǒudé; Su Yu-te), plagiarize poems written by other people and pretend to be poets. Pseudo-caizi are foils to the real caizi in caizi jiaren stories.

Illustrations of characters and scenes from the novel
