= Jean-Pierre Abel-Rémusat =

French sinologist (1788–1832)

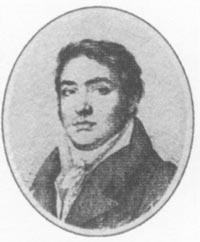
- Born: 5 September 1788; Paris, France
- Died: 2 June 1832 (aged 43); Paris, France
- Spouse: Jenny Lecamus
- Scientific career
- Fields: Chinese language, literature
- Workplaces: Collège de France
- Patrons: Silvestre de Sacy
- Notable students: Fulgence Fresnel; Stanislas Julien

Chinese name
- Chinese: 雷暮沙
Transcriptions
Standard Mandarin
- Hanyu Pinyin: Léi Mùshā

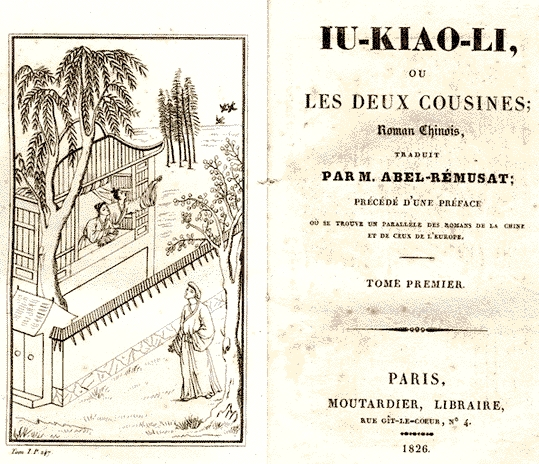
Cover of the French version of Iu-kiao-li: or, the Two Fair Cousins by Abel-Rémusat, titled Iu-kiao-li, ou les deux cousines

Jean-Pierre Abel-Rémusat (French: [ʒɑ̃ pjɛʁ abɛl ʁemyza]; 5 September 1788 – 2 June 1832) was a French sinologist best known as the first Chair of Sinology at the Collège de France. Rémusat studied medicine as a young man, but his discovery of a Chinese herbal treatise enamored him with the Chinese language, and he spent five years teaching himself to read it. After publishing several well-received articles on Chinese topics, a chair in Chinese was created at the Collège de France in 1814 and Rémusat was placed in it.

== Life ==
Rémusat was born in Paris on 5 September 1788 and was educated for the medical profession, earning a doctorate in medicine in 1813. While studying medicine, Rémusat discovered a Chinese herbal treatise in the collection of the Abbé Tersan and was immediately fascinated by it. He taught himself to read it by tirelessly studying the traditional Chinese dictionary Zhengzitong. In 1811, at the end of five years of study, he produced the work Essai sur la langue et la littérature chinoises (Essay on Chinese language and literature), and a paper on foreign languages among the Chinese, which procured him the patronage of Silvestre de Sacy. In 1813, Rémusat published an essay in Latin on the nature of Chinese characters and Classical Chinese entitled "Utrum Lingua Sinica sit vere monosyllabica? Disputatio philologica, in qua de Grammatica Sinica obiter agiture; autore Abelo de Remusat".

Rémusat's early publications established his reputation in the academic community, and on November 29, 1814, a chair in Chinese was created for him at the Collège de France. This date, or, alternatively, the date of his inaugural lecture (January 16, 1815), has been termed "the birth-year of [academic] sinology." Rémusat's course in Chinese at the Collège de France focused on lectures on grammar and the study of classical texts such as the Hallowed Documents (Shàngshū), the Laozi (Dao De Jing), the Nestorian Stele, and both Chinese and Manchu editions of the accounts of the life of Confucius. His lecture notes were eventually edited into book form, modeled on Joseph de Prémare's earlier grammar, and published in 1822 as Élémens de la grammaire chinoise, ou Principes généraux du Kou-wen ou style antique, et du Kouan-hou, c'est-à-dire, de la language commune généralement usitée dans l'empire chinois (Elements of Chinese Grammar, or General Principles of Gǔwén or Ancient Style, and of Guānhuà, that is to say, the Common Language Generally Used in the Chinese Empire). This work was the first scientific exposition of the Chinese language in Europe, and was later praised by Henri Maspero as "the first [work] in which the grammar was isolated to take account of the proper spirit of the Chinese language, and not just as a translation exercise where all the grammatical forms of the European languages [...] imposed their individual patterns."

Rémusat became an editor of the Journal des savants in 1818. Amid other misunderstanding of his sources, his self-assured misreading of the Japanese mujintō (無人島, "desert island[s]") in an 1817 article for the journal was responsible for the name of the Bonin Islands. He was the founder and first secretary of the Société asiatique at Paris in 1822; he also held various Government appointments.

In 1826, Rémusat published Iu-kiao-li, ou les deux cousines, roman chinois (Yu Jiao Li, titled in English as Iu-kiao-li: or, the Two Fair Cousins), one of the first Chinese novels known in Europe (the Chinese original is a minor work, though). It was read by Thomas Carlyle, Ralph Waldo Emerson, Goethe and Stendhal. A list of his works is given in Quérard's France littéraire s.v. Rémusat. His letters to Wilhelm von Humboldt are also of interest. In 1829, he was elected as a member to the American Philosophical Society.

Around 1830 Rémusat was commissioned to inventory the Chinese items held in the French Royal Library, which inspired him to begin a translation of the bibliographical sections of the Wenxian tongkao to assist European scholars in studying Chinese scholarship. He completed the first volume, "Classics", in 1832, but contracted cholera and died before it was printed. Rémusat is buried along with his wife Jenny Lecamus – the daughter of Jean Lecamus, a former mayor of Paris – near the church of St. Fargeau in Saint-Fargeau-Ponthierry, Seine-et-Marne.

Rémusat was notably a lifelong "armchair Sinologist" who never actually set foot in China. This can in part be explained by him living during the time of China's isolationist Canton System (1757–1842), when Western traders were permitted only the barest minimum of contact with Chinese persons. A symbolic visit to Guangzhou might therefore have been less helpful for language and culture acquisition than it might initially appear.

== Selected works ==
- Abel-Rémusat, Jean-Pierre (July 1817), "Description d'un Groupe d'Îles Peu Connues et Situé entre le Japon et les Îles Mariannes, Rédigée d'après les Relations des Japonais [Description of a Little Known Group of Islands Situated between Japan and the Mariana Islands, Including the Accounts of the Japanese]", Journal des Savans [Journal of the Learnèd] (in French), Paris: Royal Printing Office, pp. 387–396.
- "Note sur Quelques Épithétes Descriptives du Bouddha [Note on Certain Descriptive Epithets of the Buddha]", Journal des Savans [Journal of the Learnèd] (in French), Paris: Royal Printing Office, 1819, pp. 387–396.
- Description du Royaume de Cambodge par un Voyageur Chinois qui a Visité Cette contrée à la Fin du XIII Siècle, Précédée d'une Notice Chronologique sur Ce Même Pays, Extraité des Annales de la Chine [Description of the Kingdom of Cambodia by a Chinese Traveller who Visited at the End of the 13th Century, Preceded by a Chronological Notice on This Same Country Extracted from the Chinese Annals] (in French), Paris: James Smith, 1819.
- Recherches sur les Langues Tartares, ou, Mémoires sur Différents Points de la Grammaire et de la Littérature des Mandchous, des Mongols, des Ouigours, et des Tibétains [Research on the Tartar Languages, or, Essays on Different Points of Manchu, Mongol, Uyghur, and Tibetan Grammar and Literature] (in French), Paris: Royal Printing Office, 1820.
- Histoire de la Ville de Khotan... [History of the Town of Khotan] (in French), Paris: Doublet, 1820.
- "Sur la Succession des 33 Premiers Patriarches de la Religion de Bouddha [On the Succession of the First 33 Patriarchs of the Religion of Buddha]", Journal des Savans [Journal of the Learnèd] (in French), Paris: Royal Printing Office, 1821, p. 4.
- Élémens de la Grammaire Chinoise, ou, Principes Généraux du Kou-wen ou Style Antique... [Elements of Chinese Grammar, or, General Principles of Guwen or Ancient Chinese...] (in French), Paris: Royal Printing Office, 1822.
- "Aperçu d'un Mémoire sur l'Origine de la Hiérarchie Lamaique [Outline of an Essay on the Origin of the Tibetan Buddhist Hierarchy]", Journal Asiatique [Asiatic Journal] (in French), vol. 4, Paris: Société Asiatique, 1824, p. 257.
- Mélanges Asiatiques, ou, Choix de Morceaux de Critique et de Mémoires Relatifs aux Religions, aux Sciences, à l'Histoire, et à la Géographie des Nations Orientales [An Asiatic Miscellany, or, Selected Monographs and Essays on the Religions, Sciences, History, and Geography of the Eastern Nations], Librairie Orientale [Oriental Library] (in French), Paris: Société Asiatique, 1825, Vol. I and II.
- Iu-Kiao-Li, ou, Les Deux Cousines, Roman Chinois [Yujiaoli 玉嬌梨, or, The Two Cousins, A Chinese Novel] (PDF) (in French), Paris: Moutardier, 1826, Vol. I, II, III, and IV, from the novel by Zhang Yun during the early Qing dynasty.
- Nouveaux Mélanges Asiatiques, ou, Recueil de Morceaux Critiques et de Mémoires Relatifs aux Religions, aux Sciences, aux Coutumes, à l'Histoire et à la Géographie des Nations Orientales [A New Asiatic Miscellany, or, A Collection of Monographs and Essays on the Religions, Sciences, Customs, History, and Geography of the Eastern Nations], Librairie Orientale [Oriental Library] (in French), Paris: Schubart & Heideloff, 1829, Vol. I and II.
- "Observations sur Trois Mémoires de De Guignes Insérés dans le Tome XI. de la Collection de l'Académie des Inscriptions et Belles-Lettres et Relatifs à la Religion Samanéenne [Observations on Three Essays by De Guignes Inserted into Vol. XI of the Collection of the Academy of Inscriptions and Literature and Relating to Indian Asceticism]", Nouveau Journal Asiatique... [New Asiatic Journal...], 2 (in French), vol. 7, Paris: Société Asiatique, 1831, pp. 265, 269, 301.
- "Observations sur l'Ouvrage de M. Schmidt Intitulé Histoire des Mongols Orientaux [Observations on Mr. Schmidt's Work Entitled History of the Eastern Mongols]", Nouveau Journal Asiatique... [New Asiatic Journal...], 2 (in French), vol. 8 & 9, Paris: Royal Printing Office, 1831–1832, Pt. I, II. Histoire du Tibet [History of Tibet], and III. Histoire des Mongols [History of the Mongols].
- Foé Koué Ki, ou, Relations des Royaumes Bouddhiques: Voyage dans la Tartarie, dans l'Afghanistan, et dans l'Inde Exécuté à la Fin du IVe Siècle par Chy Fa Hian [The Foguoji 佛國記, or, Relations of the Buddhist Kingdoms: The Voyage through Tartary, Afghanistan, and India Carried Out at the End of the 4th Century by Shi Faxian] (in French), Paris: Royal Printing Office, 1836, completed and expanded by Julius Klaproth and E.A.X.C. de Landresse.
- "Mémoires sur un Voyage dans l'Asie Centrale, dans le Pays des Afghans, et des Beloutches, et dans l'Inde, Exécuté à la Fin du IVe Síècle de Notre Ère par Plusieurs Samanéens de Chine [Essay on a Voyage in Central Asia, the Lands of the Afghans and Balochs, and India Carried Out at the End of the 4th Century of Our Era by Several Ascetics from China]", Mémoires de l'Institut de France [Essays from the Institute of France] (in French), vol. 13, Paris: Royal Printing Office, 1838, pp. 345–412.
- Mélanges Posthumes d'Histoire et de Littérature Orientales [A Posthumous Miscellany on Eastern History and Literature] (in French), Paris: Royal Printing Office, 1843, organized by a Institut de France committee composed of C. B. Hase, J. B. F. Lajard, and Eugène Burnouf.
- Rousseau, Jean; Thouard, Denis, eds. (1999), Lettres Édifiantes et Curieuses sur la Langue Chinoise: Un Débat Philosopho-Grammatical entre Wilhelm von Humboldt et Jean-Pierre Abel-Rémusat (1821–1831) ... [Edifying and Curious Letters on the Chinese Language: A Philosophico-Grammatical Debate between Wilhelm von Humboldt and Jean-Pierre Abel-Rémusat (1821–1831)], Problématiques Philosophiques, Villeneuve-d'Ascq: Presses Universitaires du Septentrion, a scholarly collection of his correspondence with Wilhelm von Humboldt edited by Jean Rousseau and Denis Thouard.

Much of the bibliography above has been drawn from Schlagintweit.

In addition, Rémusat's practical and scholarly contributions in bringing the Dutch Japanologist Isaac Titsingh's unfinished manuscripts to posthumous publication deserve acknowledgment. These works include Nihon Ōdai Ichiran (日本王代一覧, Table of the rulers of Japan), and also:

- Rémusat, A., éditeur. Mémoires et Anecdotes sur la Dynastie régnante des Djogouns, Souverains du Japon, avec la description des fêtes et cérémonies observées aux différentes époques de l'année à la Cour de ces Princes, et un appendice contenant des détails sur la poésie des Japonais, leur manière de diviser l'année, etc.; Ouvrage orné de Planches gravées et coloriées, tiré des Originaux Japonais par M. Isaac Titsingh; publié avec des Notes et Eclaircissemens Par M. Abel Rémusat. Paris (Nepveu), 1820.

== See also ==
- Xiongnu
