= Jean-Jacques-Antoine Caussin de Perceval =

French orientalist (1759-1835)

- Born: 24 June 1759; Montdidier
- Died: 29 July 1835 (aged 76); Paris
- Occupation: Orientalist

Jean-Jacques-Antoine Caussin de Perceval (24 June 1759 – 29 July 1835) was an 18th–19th-century French orientalist.

== Biography ==
The son of a cloth merchant of Montdidier, he moved to Paris to reunite with his uncle François Béjot, custodian of manuscripts in the bibliothèque du Roi. He learned Hebrew and Arabic at the Collège de France where he attended the lessons of Cardonne and Deshauterayes whom he succeeded in the chair of Arabic in 1783. In 1787, he replaced his uncle as custodian of manuscripts in the library of the king, a position he held until 1792.

Stayed clear of political events, he entered in 1809 at the Institute (Académie des Inscriptions) of which he became president, earning him the honor to deliver the tribute to Louis-Mathieu Langlès.

He was Armand-Pierre Caussin de Perceval's father.

== Works ==
Translator:

- from Greek:
  - 1796: the Argonautica by Apollonius of Rhodes;
- from Arabic:
  - 1806: la Suite des Mille et une Nuits, Arab and Persian tales taken from manuscripts of the bibliothèque nationale de France;
  - 1802: Histoire de la Sicile sous les Musulmans d'Al-Nuwayri;
  - 1818: The Séances de Hariri;
  - the Tables astronomiques of Ibn Yunus, etc.
