= Ping Shan Leng Yan =

Cover of Ping Shan Leng Yan, from the Hanan collection, Harvard-Yenching Library, Harvard University.

Pages from chapter nine of the novel

Ping Shan Leng Yan (Chinese: 平山冷燕; pinyin: Píng Shān Lěng Yān; Wade–Giles: P'ing Shan Leng Yen), also translated into English as Flat Mountain and Cold Swallow and Cold Swallows in the Peaceful Hill, (Note: The title of the novel Ping Shan Leng Shan has also been variously translated into English as Flat Mountain and Cold Swallow and Cold Swallows in the Peaceful Hill. However, the title have multiple meanings, in which when reading it literally, can refer to "mountains" and "swallows", but in actuality, the four words refer to the four main characters' surnames.) is a classic caizi jiaren novel written in early Qing dynasty China. The earliest extant edition of the novel is a printed edition dating from 1658, now preserved in the Dalian Library. The title of the book is derived from the surnames of the two couples featured in the book. The novel is sometimes attributed to Di An Shanren (Chinese: 荻岸山人), but the authorship is uncertain. It has also been attributed to Tianhua Zang Zhuren (天花藏主人), a pseudonym meaning "Master of the Heavenly Flower Sutra". Yu jiao li and Ping Shan Leng Yan were both written by the same Tianhua Zang Zhuren according to a style analysis by caizi jiaren scholar Qing Ping Wang. Classical Chinese scholar and Yale professor Chloë Starr lists Ping Shan Leng Yan along with Yu jiao li and Haoqiu zhuan as one of the three best-known examples of the caizi jiaren genre.

In the novel, both Miss Shan Dai and her maid Miss Leng Jiangxue are talented writers. Two young scholars decide to woo them with their own poetry, but discover that their poems have been plagiarized by rival suitors. The ladies and their would-be suitors challenge each other to a poetry contest, which the ladies win. In the end, the two new couples wed with the blessing of the Emperor.

== Plot ==
Miss Shan Dai, a beautiful girl, is so talented that she passes the challenging tests set by her tutor and impresses her father, an imperial official. Miss Leng Jiangxue, also a talented young woman, is sent from a poor family to be Shan's maid, on the way sees a striking poem written by an impoverished student, Ping Ruheng. Ping is traveling to Songjiang, where he meets the accomplished and handsome scholar, Yan Baihan. The two young men decide to go to Beijing in disguise to find the renowned Shan Dai, but while they are en route, other suitors plagiarize their poetry to woo the young ladies. The plot climaxes in a poetry contest in which the two young ladies defeat Ping and Yan in a competition to write the best poem, and in the end their marriages are approved by the emperor himself.

Pseudo-caizi are foils to the real caizi in caizi jiaren stories. Here, the characters, Song Xin (C: 宋 信, P: Sòng Xìn, W: Sung Hsin) and Dou Guoyi (T: 竇國一, S: 窦国一, P: Dòu Guóyī, W: To Kuo-i), plagiarize poems written by Ping and Yan and pretend to be poets.

Illustrations of the four protagonists, whose surnames forms the novel's title
Ping Ruheng

Shan Dai

Leng Jiangxue

Yan Baihan

== See also ==
- Iu-kiao-li: or, the Two Fair Cousins, another classic caizi jiaren novel
