= Julius Klaproth =

German linguist (1783–1835)

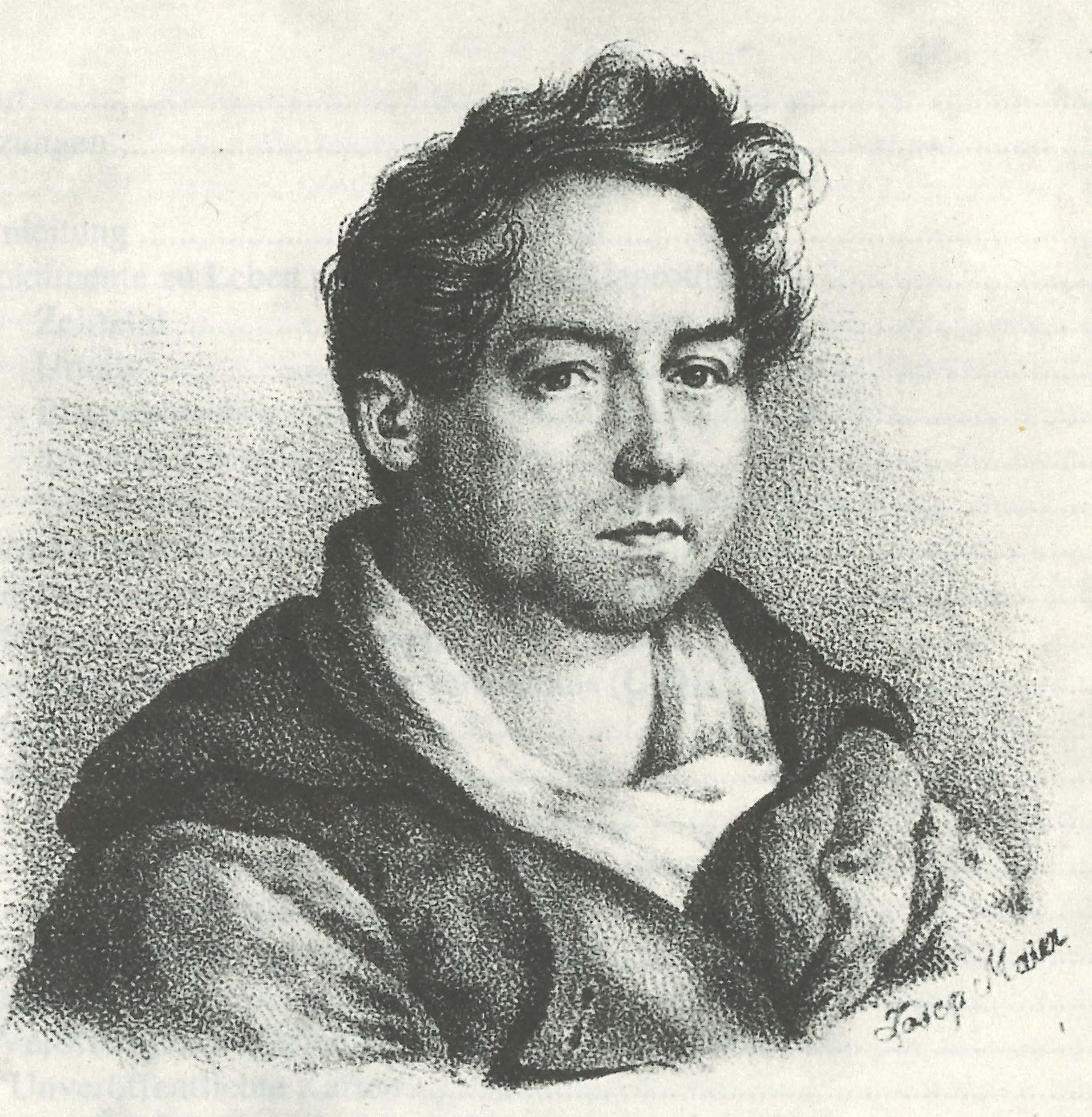
- Julius Klaproth
- Born: 11 October 1783; Berlin
- Died: 28 August 1835 (aged 51); Paris
- Known for: Instrumental in turning East Asian Studies into scientific disciplines with critical methods
- Scientific career
- Fields: Linguistics, history, ethnography, writing, Orientalism and exploration

Heinrich Julius Klaproth (11 October 1783 – 28 August 1835) was a German linguist, historian, ethnographer, author, orientalist and explorer. As a scholar, he is credited along with Jean-Pierre Abel-Rémusat with being instrumental in turning East Asian Studies into scientific disciplines with critical methods.

== Name ==
H. J. Klaproth was usually known as Julius or Julius von Klaproth. His name also erroneously appears as "Julius Heinrich Klaproth".

== Life ==
Klaproth was born in Berlin on 11 October 1783, the son of the chemist Martin Heinrich Klaproth, who is credited with the discovery of four elements including uranium.

Young Klaproth devoted his energies in quite early life to the study of Asiatic languages, and published in 1802 his Asiatisches Magazin (Weimar 1802–1803). He was in consequence called to Saint Petersburg and given an appointment in the academy there. In 1805 he was a member of Count Golovkin's embassy to China. On his return he was despatched by the academy to the Caucasus on an ethnographical and linguistic exploration (1807–1808), and was afterwards employed for several years in connection with the academy's Oriental publications. In 1812 he moved to Berlin.

In 1815 he settled in Paris, and in 1816 Humboldt procured him from the king of Prussia the title and salary of professor of Asiatic languages and literature, with permission to remain in Paris as long as was requisite for the publication of his works. He died in Paris on 28 August 1835.

Klaproth was an orientalist, or an "Asiatologist", in that he had a good command not only of Chinese, but also Manchu, Mongolian, Sanskrit, Turkish, Arabic, Persian, and even Caucasian languages. His wide range of interests encompassed the study of the development of individual countries in their Asian context, which contrast with the 21st century focus on specialization. It is possible that Klaproth was the first person describe Tibetan, Chinese, and Burmese as related to each other.

Klaproth's 1812 Dissertation on Language and Script of the Uighurs (Abhandlung über die Sprache und Schrift der Uiguren) was disputed by Isaak Jakob Schmidt, who is considered the founder of Mongolian Studies. Klaproth asserted that the Uighur language was a Turkic language, which today is undisputed, while Schmidt was persuaded that Uighur should be classified as a "Tangut" language.

== Works ==
Klaproth's bibliography extends to more than 300 published items.

His great work Asia Polyglotta (Paris, 1823 and 1831, with Sprachatlas) not only served as a résumé of all that was known on the subject, but formed a new departure for the classification of the Eastern languages, especially those of the Russian Empire.

The Itinerary of a Chinese Traveller (1821), a series of documents in the military archives of St. Petersburg purporting to be the travels of "George Ludwig von —", and a similar series obtained from him in the London foreign office, are all regarded as spurious.

Klaproth's other works include:

- Reise in den Kaukasus und Georgien in den Jahren 1807 und 1808 (Halle, 1812–1814; French translation, Paris, 1823)
- Geographisch-historische Beschreibung des ostlichen Kaukasus (Weimar 1814)
- Tableaux historiques de l'Asie (Paris, 1826)
- Memoires relatifs a l'Asie (Paris, 1824–1828)
- Tableau historique, geographique, ethnographique et politique de Caucase (Paris, 1827)
- Vocabulaire et grammaire de la langue georgienne (Paris, 1827)

Klaproth was also the first to publish a translation of Taika era Japanese poetry in the West. Donald Keene explained in a preface to the Nippon Gakujutsu Shinkōkai edition of the Man'yōshū:

"One 'envoy' (hanka) to a long poem was translated as early as 1834 by the celebrated German orientalist Heinrich Julius Klaproth (1783–1835). Klaproth, having journeyed to Siberia in pursuit of strange languages, encountered some Japanese castaways, fisherman, hardly ideal mentors for the study of 8th century poetry. Not surprisingly, his translation was anything but accurate."

Other works on Japan include:

- 1832 – Sangoku Tsūran Zusetsu (San kokf tsou ran to sets or Aperçu général des trois royaumes, Paris: Oriental Translation Fund.San kokf tsou ran to sets: ou, Aperqu géneral des trois royaumes
- 1834 – Nihon Ōdai Ichiran (Nipon O daï itsi ran or Annales des empereurs du Japon), tr. par M. Isaac Titsingh avec l'aide de plusieurs interprètes attachés au comptoir hollandais de Nangasaki; ouvrage re., complété et cor. sur l'original japonais-chinois, accompagné de notes et précédé d'un Aperçu d'histoire mythologique du Japon, par M.J. Klaproth. Paris: Oriental Translation Fund.

== See also ==
- Xiongnu
