= Isaac Jacob Schmidt =

Dutch-born Russian Orientalist and missionary

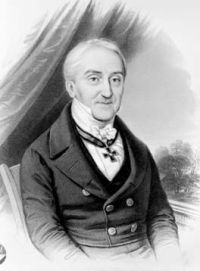
- Born: 25 October [O.S. 14 October] 1779; Amsterdam, Netherland
- Died: 20 September [O.S. 8 September] 1847; Saint Petersburg, Russian Empire
- Awards: Order of Saint Vladimir

Isaac Jacob Schmidt (Russian: Яков Иванович (Исаак Якоб) Шмидт; 25 October [O.S. 14 October] 1779 — 20 September [O.S. 8 September] 1847) was an Orientalist specialising in Mongolian and Tibetan studies. Schmidt was a Moravian missionary to the Kalmyks and devoted much of his labour to Bible translation.

Born in Amsterdam, he spent much of his career in St. Petersburg as a member of the Russian Academy of Sciences. He published the first grammar and dictionary of Mongolian, as well as a grammar and dictionary of Tibetan. He also translated Saghang Sechen's Erdeni-yin tobči into German, and several Geser Khan epics into Russian and German. His works are regarded as ground-breaking for the establishment of Mongolian and Tibetan studies.

== Early life ==
Schmidt was born into an Amsterdam Moravian family. At the age of six, he was sent to school of the Moravian community in Neuwied. Due to the advance of Napoleon's troops, he returned home in 1791. His family lost all their wealth in an economic crisis following Napoleon's occupation of the Netherlands, but this gave Isaak Jakob Schmidt the impetus to begin a trading apprenticeship and learn several languages. In 1798 he accepted an offer by his church to work at their Sarepta post on the Volga River, emigrated to Russia and adopted Russian citizenship.

== Research work ==
His work gave Schmidt an opportunity for frequent business contacts with the local Kalmyks, and he eventually learnt both the Kalmyk and the classical Mongolian script. At the same time, he began collecting Kalmyk and Mongolian manuscripts and keeping records on Kalmyk language, religion and history. From 1807 to 1812 Schmidt worked for his church in Saratov. In 1812, he married his wife Helena Wigand. In the same year, his church sent him to Moscow and then to St. Petersburg. Unfortunately, many of his records and collected manuscripts were destroyed in the fire of Moscow of that year.

In 1812, Julius Klaproth's Dissertation on language and script of the Uighurs (Abhandlung über die Sprache und Schrift der Uiguren) became the subject of a long-standing dispute. Klaproth asserted that Uighur was a Turkic language, while Schmidt was persuaded that Uighur should be classified as a "Tangut" language.

In the following years, Schmidt concentrated on translations of the Bible into Kalmyk and Mongolian. His scientific work became noted after the publication of a work on the history of Mongols and Tibetans in 1824. His daughter Emilie was born in 1828. Until his death in 1847, Schmidt published a multitude of works on Mongolian and Tibetan studies, and became a member of a number of different European academic societies.

== Publications ==
- Evangelium St. Mathaei in linguam Calmucco-Mongolicam translatum ab Isaaco Jacobo Schmidt, cura et studio Societatis Biblicae Ruthenicae typis impressum, Petropoli 1815;
- Account of the manner in which the study of the Gospel was, by the power of God, made the means of awakening two Saisangs (Mongolian nobles or princes), of the Chorinian Buräts; extracted from a report sent by Brother Isaac Jacob Schmidt, of the Church of the United Brethren, and Treasurer to the Bible Society at Petersburg, to the Elders Conference of the Unity, in: Periodical accounts 6, 1817, 466-473
- Kurze Darstellung der christlichen Glaubenslehre, St. Petersburg 1817v
- Christliche Tractätlein zur Bekehrung der Burjäten, in zwey Abtheilungen, St. Petersburg 1818
- Einwürfe gegen die Hypothesen des Herrn Hofr. Klaproth: Über Sprache und Schrift der Uiguren (siehe dessen Reise 2ter Band Seite 481 Halle und Berlin 1814). Von Jos. Jac. Schmidt in St. Petersburg, in: Fundgruben des Orients 6, 1818, 321-338
- Das Evangelium Matthaei in die Mongolische Sprache/ übers. von I. J. Schmidt, St. Petersburg, 1819
- Das Evangelium Johannis in die Mongolische Sprache/ übers. von I. J. Schmidt, St. Petersburg, 1819
- Die Apostelgeschichte in die Kalmükische Sprache/ übers. von I. J. Schmidt, 1820
- Das Evangelium Matthaei in die Kalmükische Sprache/ übers. von I. J. Schmidt, St. Petersburg, 1820
- Das Evangelium Johannis in die Kalmükische Sprache/ übers. von I. J. Schmidt, St. Petersburg, 1820
- Die Apostelgeschichte in die Mongolische Sprache/ übers. von I. J. Schmidt, 1820
- Die Evangelien Marci und Lucae in die Kalmükische Sprache/ übers. von I. J. Schmidt, 1821 (?);
- Die Evangelien Marci und Lucae in die Mongolische Sprache/ übers. von I. J. Schmidt], 1821;
- Extrait d'une lettre de M. Schmidt, datée de Saint-Pétersbourg, 13/25 octobre 1820, in: JA 1, 1822, 182-184
- Extrait d'une lettre de M. Schmidt, à M., sur quelques sujets relatifs à l'histoire et à la littérature mongoles, 10/ 22 octobre 1820, St.-Pétersbourg, Dec. 1822, in: JA 1, 1822, 320-334
- Alphabet et syllabaire devanagari, nommé Landsa, avec la transcription en tibétain et en Mongol, d'après un exemplaire imprimé de M. Is. Jac. Schmidt et exécuté lithographiquement par Jacques Rakhonin. St.-Pétersbourg 1822
- Extrait d'une lettre de M. Schmidt, de St. Pétersbourg, addressée à M. Klaproth, en réponse à l'Examen des extraits d'une Histoire des khans Mongols, Paris 1823 (auch in JA 3, 1823, 107-113).
- Forschungen im Gebiete der älteren religiösen, politischen und literärischen Bildungsgeschichte der Völker Mittel-Asiens, vorzüglich der Mongolen und Tibeter, St. Petersburg, Leipzig 1824
- Philologisch-kritische Zugabe zu den von Herrn Abel-Rémusat bekannt gemachten, in den Königlich-Französischen Archiven befindlichen zwei mongolischen Original-Briefen der Könige von Persien Argun und Öldshaitu an Philipp den Schönen, St. Petersburg 1824
- I. J. Schmidt's Würdigung und Abfertigung der Klaprothschen sogenannten Beleuchtung und Widerlegung seiner Forschungen im Gebiete der Geschichte der Völker Mittel-Asiens, Leipzig 1826
- Neues Testament in Kalmükischer Sprache, 1827 (?).
- Neues Testament in Mongolischer Sprache], [1827 (?)]
- Über die Verwandtschaft der gnostisch-theosophischen Lehren mit den Religions-Systemen des Orients, vorzüglich des Buddhaismus, Leipzig 1828
- Über das Wort Bedola (oder Bedolach). Gen. II: 11-12 und Num. XI, 7, in: Leipziger Literatur-Zeitung, 1828, 924 f.
- Geschichte der Ost-Mongolen und ihres Fürstenhauses, verfasst von Ssanang Ssetsen Chungtaidschi der Ordus; aus dem Mongolischen übersetzt und mit dem Originaltexte, nebst Anmerkungen, Erläuterungen und Citaten aus andern unedirten Originalwerken herausgegeben, St. Petersburg, Leipzig 1829
- Über den Nutzen des Studiums der ostasiatischen Sprachen überhaupt und in besonderer Beziehung auf Rußland, in: St. Petersburgische Zeitung, 1829, Nr. 17, 93-94
- Anzeige einer von der Regierung neu-erworbenen Sammlung orientalischer Werke, in: St. Petersburgische Zeitung, 1830, 88-90
- Grammatik der Mongolischen Sprache, St. Petersburg, 1831
- Istorija Tibeta i Chuchunora (Kĕkenora ili Tangustkoj oblasti), s drevnĕjšich vremen do XIII stolĕtija po R. Ch. - Preved s kitajskago monacha Iakinfa Bičurina. Iz donesenija G-na Ad-junkta Šmita, čitannago v zasĕdani 3 Fev. 1830 g., in: Čtenija imperatorskoj Akademii nauk. Otdelenia nauk istor., filol. o političeskich kn. 1, 1831, 33-39;
- O nekotorych osnovnych položenijach Buddizma. Čitano G-n Šmitom v zasedanie 9-go Dekabrja 1829 goda, in: Čtenija imperatorskoj Akademii nauk. Otdelenia nauk istor., filol. o politiceskich kn. 1, 1831, 40-51
- Rukovodstvo dlja izučenija Mongol'skogo jazyka, sostavlennoe g-m Šmitom. Izvlečeno iz donesenija G-na Šmita, čitannago 17 Marta 1830 g., in: Čtenija imperatorskoj Akademii nauk. Otdelenia nauk istor., filol. o političeskich kn. 1, 1831, 94-99
- O proischoždenii tibetskich pismen. Citano G. Šmitom 15-go Maja 1829 goda, in: Čtenija imperatorskoj Akademii nauk. Otdelenia nauk istor., filol. o političeskich kn. 1, 1831, 100-103
- Grammatika Mongol'skogo jazyka, St. Petersburg 1832
- Notice sur une médaille mongole de Ghazan khan, traduit de l'allemand par M. Jacquet, in: Nouveau Journal asiatique 8, 1831, 344-348
- Über den Ursprung der tibetischen Schrift, in: Mémoires de l'Academie impériale des sciences de St. Pétersbourg VI, 1, 1832, 41-54
- Über einige Grundlehren des Buddhaismus, in: Mémoires de l'Académie impériale des sciences de St. Pétersbourg, VI, 1, 1832, 89-120 u. 221-262
- Anfang der Sanskrit-Studien in Rußland, in: St. Petersburgische Zeitung, 1833, 209, 819-820
- Über die sogenannte dritte Welt der Buddhaisten, in: Mémoires de l'Académie impériale des sciences de St. Pétersbourg, VI, 2, 1834, 1-39
- Über die tausend Buddhas einer Weltperiode der Einwohnung oder gleichmäßiger Dauer, in: Mémoires de l'Académie impériale des sciences de St. Pétersbourg, VI, 2, 1834, 41-86
- Die Volksstämme der Mongolen: als Beitrag zur Geschichte dieses Volkes und seines Fürstenhauses [I], in: Mémoires de l'Académie impériale des sciences de St. Pétersbourg, VI, 2, 1834, 409-477
- Bericht über eine Inschrift der ältesten Zeit der Mongolen-Herrschaft, in: Mémoires de l'Académie impériale des sciences de St. Pétersbourg, VI, 2, 1834, 243-256
- Ursprung des Namens Mandschu, in: St. Petersburgische Zeitung, 1834, Nr. 253, 1006
- Mongolisch-Deutsch-Russisches Wörterbuch: nebst einem deutschen und einem russischen Wortregister = Mongol'sko-nemecko-rossijskij slovar': s prisovokupleniem' nemeckago i russkago alfavitnych' spiskov'. St. Petersburg, 1835
- Über die Naturansicht der alten Völker, in: St. Petersburgische Zeitung, 1835, 5, 20-22;
- [Mitarbeit am] Enciklopediceskij Leksikon, Sanktpeterburg 1835-1836
- Studium des Sanskrit in Russland, in: St. Petersburgische Zeitung, 1836, 65, 278;
- Über den Lamaismus und die Bedeutungslosigkeit dieser Benennung, in: Bulletin scientifique publié par l'Académie impériale des sciences de Saint-Pétersbourg 1, 1836, 11-14;
- Über die Begründung des tibetischen Sprachstudiums in Rußland und die Herausgabe der dazu nöthigen Hülfswerke, in: Bulletin scientifique publié par l'Académie impériale des sciences de Saint-Pétersbourg 1, 1836, 28-31;
- Über das Mahâjâna und Pradschnâ-Pâramita der Bauddhen, in: Mémoires de l'Académie impériale des sciences de St. Pétersbourg, VI, 4, 1836, 145-149;
- Die Thaten des Vertilgers der zehn Übel in den zehn Gegenden, des verdienstvollen Helden Bogda Gesser Chan: eine mongolische Heldensage: nach einem in Peking gedruckten Exemplare / Podvigi ispolnennago zaslug geroja Bogdy Gesser Chana, St. Petersburg 1836
- Die Thaten Bogda Gesser Chan's, des Vertilgers der Wurzel der zehn Übel in den zehn Gegenden: eine ostasiatische Heldensage, St. Petersburg, Leipzig 1839.
- Über die Heroen des vorgeschichtlichen Alterthums, in: Bulletin scientifique publié par l'Académie impériale des sciences de Saint-Pétersbourg 2, 1837, 52-60;
- Note sur quelques monnaies géorgiennes du Musée asiatique et sur une inscription tibétaine d'Edchmiadzin, par M. Brosset (lu le 25 août 1837), in: Bulletin scientifique publié par l'Académie impériale des sciences de Saint-Pétersbourg 2, 1837, 381-384;
- Ueber einige Eigenthümlichkeiten der Tibetischen Sprache u. Schrift, in: Bulletin scientifique publié par l'Académie impériale des sciences de Saint-Pétersbourg 3, 1838, 225-231;
- Grammatik der Tibetischen Sprache, St. Petersburg, 1839;
- Grammatika tibetskovo jazyka/ sočineknaja Ja. Šmidtom, Sankt Peterburg, 1839
- Beleuchtung einer neuen Übersetzung der Mongolischen Inschrift auf dem bekannten Denkmale Tschings Chan's, in: St. Petersburgische Zeitung, 1839, 214, 1019–1020;
- O novom perevode Mongol'skoj nadpisi na izvestnom pamjatnike Čingis-Chana, in: Sanktpeterburgskija Vĕdomosti, 1839, 224, 1013–1014
- Process o Mongol'skoj nadpisi na pamjatnike Čingis-chana: O novom perevode Mongol'skoj nadpisi na izvestnom pamjatnike Čingis-chana, in: Otečestvennye zapiski, 7, 1839, 27-33;
- Bericht über eine deutsche Übersetzung der mongolischen Helden-Sage "Die Thaten Gesser Chan's", in: Bulletin scientifique publié par l'Académie impériale des sciences de Saint-Pétersbourg 6, 1840, 26-30
- Kritischer Versuch zur Feststellung der Ära und der ersten geschichtlichen Momente des Buddhaismus, in: Bulletin scientifique publié par l'Académie impériale des sciences de Saint-Pétersbourg 6, 1840, 353-368
- Geschichte der Goldenen Horde in Kiptschak, das ist: der Mongolen in Rußland, Pesth 1840, 602-642;
- Tibetisch-deutsches Wörterbuch: Nebst deutschem Wortregister, St. Petersburg, Leipzig 1841;
- Neue Erläuterungen über den Ursprung des Namens Mandschu, in: Bulletin scientifique publié par l'Académie impériale des sciences de Saint-Pétersbourg 8, 1841, 376-383
- Sur un ouvrage tibétain, traduit en allemand par M. Schmidt (lu le 17 décembre 1841), in: Bulletin scientifique publié par l'Académie impériale des sciences de Saint-Pétersbourg 10, 1842, 46-48;
- Tibetsko-russkij slovar', Sanktpeterburg 1843
- Dsanglun oder der Weise und der Thor; Aus dem Tibetanischen übersetzt und mit dem Originaltexte herausgegeben. Th. 1: Der Tibetanische Text nebst der Vorrede; Th. 2: Die Übersetzung, St. Petersburg, Leipzig 1843
- Neueste Bereicherung der tibetisch-mongolischen Abtheilung des Asiatischen Museums der Kaiserlichen Akademie der Wissenschaften, in: Bulletin scientifique publié par l'Académie impériale des sciences de Saint-Pétersbourg 1, 1844, 46-48
- Index des Kandjur, St. Petersburg, 1845.
- Mongol'skaja kvadratnaja nadpis´ iz vremen Mongol'skogo vladyčestva, in: Sanktpeterburgskie Vedomosti, 1846, 249, 1095-1096.
- Mongol'skaja kvadratnaja nadpis´ iz vremen Mongol'skogo vladyčestva, in: Biblioteka dlja Čtenija 79, 1846, III, 1-5.
- Razbor sočinenija g. professora Kovalevskago pod zaglaviem: Mongol'sko-russko-francuzskij slovar', sostavlennyj g. akademikom Šmidtom, in: XV prisuždenie nagrda Demidova, 1846, 77-83
- Verzeichniss der tibetischen Handschriften und Holzdrucke im Asiatischen Museum der kaiserlichen Akademie der Wissenschaften, in: Bulletin de la classe des sciences histor. 4, 1848, 81-125.
- Ueber eine Mongolische Quadratinschrift aus der Regierungszeit der Mongolischen Dynastie Juan in China, in: Bulletin de la classe des sciences histor. 4, 1848, 129-141.
