= Johan David Åkerblad =

Swedish diplomat and orientalist

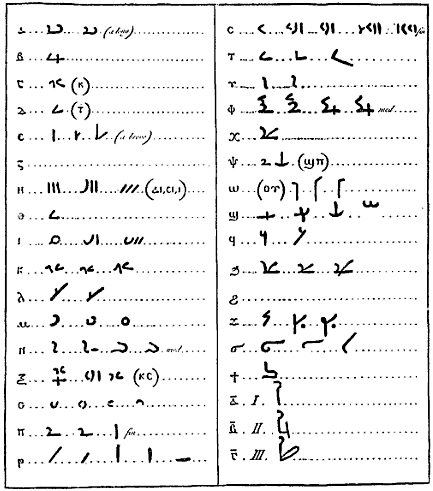
Johan Åkerblad's table of Demotic phonetic characters and their Coptic equivalents (1802)

Johan David Åkerblad (6 May 1763, Stockholm – 7 February 1819, Rome) was a Swedish diplomat and orientalist.

== Career ==
In 1778 he began his studies of classical and oriental languages at the University of Uppsala. In 1782 he defended his graduate thesis before Professor Eric Michael Fant. From 1783, he improved his language skills at the Swedish royal chancery in Istanbul.

From 1784 onwards he was a diplomat in the Ottoman Empire, Egypt and North Africa.

From 1800 he conducted research at the University of Göttingen, and at other places of learning in Paris, The Hague, and Rome. He focused on the study of ancient Egyptian. He also gathered material for a dictionary of Coptic language.

== Rosetta stone research ==
While in Paris, he was a student of Silvestre de Sacy. Sacy's investigation of the Rosetta Stone resulted in his being able to read five names, such as "Alexandros". This was reported by him in 1802. Åkerblad took on his work, and his major contribution in this area was published the same year in Paris.

Åkerblad managed to identify all proper names in the demotic text in just two months. He could also read words like "Greek", "temple" and "Egyptian" and found out the correct sound value from 14 of the 29 signs, but he wrongly believed the demotic hieroglyphs to be entirely alphabetic. One of his strategies of comparing the demotic to Coptic later became a key in Champollion's eventual decipherment of the hieroglyphic script and the Ancient Egyptian language.

In 1810, Åkerblad sent to Sacy for publication his work entitled MÉMOIRE: Sur les noms coptes de quelques villes et villages d'Égypte. Yet, unfortunately, its publication was delayed, and it was not published until 1834. Some scholars saw such delay as motivated by political or personal considerations.

His last days were spent in Rome where he was supported by Elizabeth Cavendish, the Duchess of Devonshire, and others who admired his talents.

== Published works ==
- Johan David Åkerblad, Lettre sur l'inscription Égyptienne de Rosette: adressée au citoyen Silvestre de Sacy, Professeur de langue arabe à l'École spéciale des langues orientales vivantes, etc.; Réponse du citoyen Silvestre de Sacy. Paris: L'imprimerie de la République, 1802
- Om det sittande Marmorlejonet i Venedig (1800–3)
- 1802: Inscriptionis phoenicieæ Oxoniensis nova interpretatio
- 1804: Lettre sur une inscription phénicienne, trouvée à Athenes
- 1804: Notice sur deux inscriptions en caractères runiques, trouvées à Venise et sur les Varanges, avec les remarques de M. d'Ansse de Villoison
- 1811: Sopra due laminette di bronzo trovate ne' contorni di Atene. Dissertazione letta nell'accademia libera d'archeologia al campidoglio li 30. Giugno 1811 Digitalisat at Google Books
- 1813: Inscrizione greca sopra una lamina di piombo, trovata in un sepolcro nelle vicinanze d'Atene
- 1817: Lettre à M:r le cheval. Italinsky sur une inscription phénicienne
- Johan David Åkerblad, MÉMOIRE: Sur les noms coptes de quelques villes et villages d'Égypte. Journal asiatique, 1834, vol. XIII p337
