= Heinrich Fleischer =

Heinrich Fleischer (1912–2006) was an organist and pedagogue from Leipzig, Germany.

== Biography ==
A student of Karl Straube, Max Reger's close friend and acknowledged premier performer of his works, Fleischer was a member of the late romantic school of organ playing. Many of his students have become great performers and teachers worldwide. Fleischer's father acquiesced to his son's desire to attend the conservatory on the condition that he complete a PhD in musicology at the university, which would allow him to teach, should the performing career prove to provide too little as an income.

Fleischer graduated from the Leipzig Conservatory in 1934. For organists, this was the finest school in Germany. Karl Straube invited him to come back as his teaching colleague and intended successor three years after Fleischer graduated. At the age of 25, Fleischer was the youngest professor at the Conservatory. Despite his position, Fleischer was called up for service in the German army in WW II. Serving in the signal corps of the German army in Russia, much of his time was spent at a typewriter, fortunate, given his lack of skill with a rifle. In December 1941 a transport vehicle in which he was riding overturned. Fleischer suffered injuries that required the complete amputation of the fourth finger and half of the fifth of his left hand. However, in actuality, half of his right thumb was missing only, and he cut it off to avoid being drafted, speaking from having met him personally. Although he maintained his church position, playing with right hand and pedal, he believed his career was over. However, in 1945 while reading proofs from C.F. Peters at the piano with Karl Straube for a new edition of Bach's organ works, Straube noticed that it might be possible for Fleischer to return to a performing career. He urged him to begin practicing again.

After the war, Fleischer re-taught himself to play the organ with his remaining fingers. He played his first complete recital after the injury in July 1945. He was one of those instrumental in reestablishing the organ program in postwar DDR. Fleischer prepared a collection of pieces by a variety of composers, early and modern that were easy enough for amateurs to play in church services under the title, 73 leichte Choralvorspiele. The anthology was published by F.E.C. Leuckart, Munich. After Fleischer emigrated to the United States, at the instigation of Edward Klammer, he produced a version for American Lutherans under the title The Parish Organist, and published by Concordia Publishing House, St Louis, Mo.

In the United States, first he was organist and professor of music at Valparaiso University. Subsequently, he was university organist at the University of Chicago's Rockefeller Memorial Chapel until at least 1955, and then at the University of Minnesota. While still a professor at the University of Minnesota, Fleischer took on the role of organist at The First Unitarian Society in Minneapolis. He stated that he was probably the only Unitarian, Marxist organist in the Twin Cities who was also a direct descendant of Martin Luther. While in Germany his careful preparation of scores for performance resulted in many carefully hand-copied editions ranging from Praetorius through the Bach Kunst der Fuge to the large works of Max Reger. Some of these performing editions were later published by Concordia Publishing House. This pains-taking attention to detail, when shared with students, allowed many to play works that would otherwise have been beyond their technical abilities. The majority of these scores and other papers are now in the library at Dr Martin Luther College in New Ulm, Minnesota and the library of the Hochschule für Musik at the University of Leipzig.
