= Golovkin =

Golovkin (Russian: Головкин, from головка meaning head) is a Russian masculine surname, its feminine counterpart is Golovkina. It may refer to

- Aleksandra Golovkina (born 1998), Lithuanian figure skater
- Egor Golovkin (born 1983), Russian figure skater
- Gavriil Golovkin (1660–1734), Russian statesman
- Gennady Golovkin (born 1982), Kazakhstani boxer
- Olga Golovkina (born 1986), Russian runner
- Sergey Golovkin (1959–1996), Russian serial killer
- Sofia Golovkina (1915–2004), Russian ballet dancer
- Yury Golovkin (1762–1846), Russian diplomat
