= Denis Dominique Cardonne =

French orientalist and translator

Denis Dominique Cardonne (23 March 1721 – 25 December 1783) was a French orientalist and translator.

== Biography ==
Denis Dominique Cardonne, born in Paris on March 23, 1721, he was brought at the age of nine to Constantinople, where he lived for twenty years before returning to France, where he became the secretary-interpreter of the king in oriental languages, royal censor and inspector of the library. He was nominated as a professor of the Collège royal, where he was the titular of the chair for Turkish and Persian from 1750 to his death.

He is the grandfather of the Desgranges brothers, Antoine Jérôme Desgranges (24 December 1784 - 1864) and Alix Desgranges (1793-1854), both orientalists. The former was a student at the École des Jeunes de langues from November 1793 to Brumaire year IX, and then moved to Constantinople, while the latter was made count and became a professor in Turkish at the École des jeunes de langues de Louis Le Grand and the Collège de France in 1833, until he was replaced in the latter by Joseph Matturin Cor on April 5, 1854.

== Works ==
- Histoire de l'Afrique et de l'Espagne sous la domination des Arabes. 1765.

=== Traductions ===
- Mélanges de littérature orientale, traduits de différens manuscrits turcs, arabes et persans de la Bibliothèque du Roi. 1770.
- Contes et fables indiennes de Bidpaï et de Lokman. Traduites d'Ali Tchelebi-ben-Saleh, auteur turc. 1778. (started by Antoine Galland, and finished by Cardonne)
- Extraits des manuscrits arabes dans lesquels il est parlé des événemens historiques relatifs au règne de saint Louis, traduits par M. Cardonne (PDF). 1819.
