= Armand-Pierre Caussin de Perceval =

French orientalist (1795–1871)

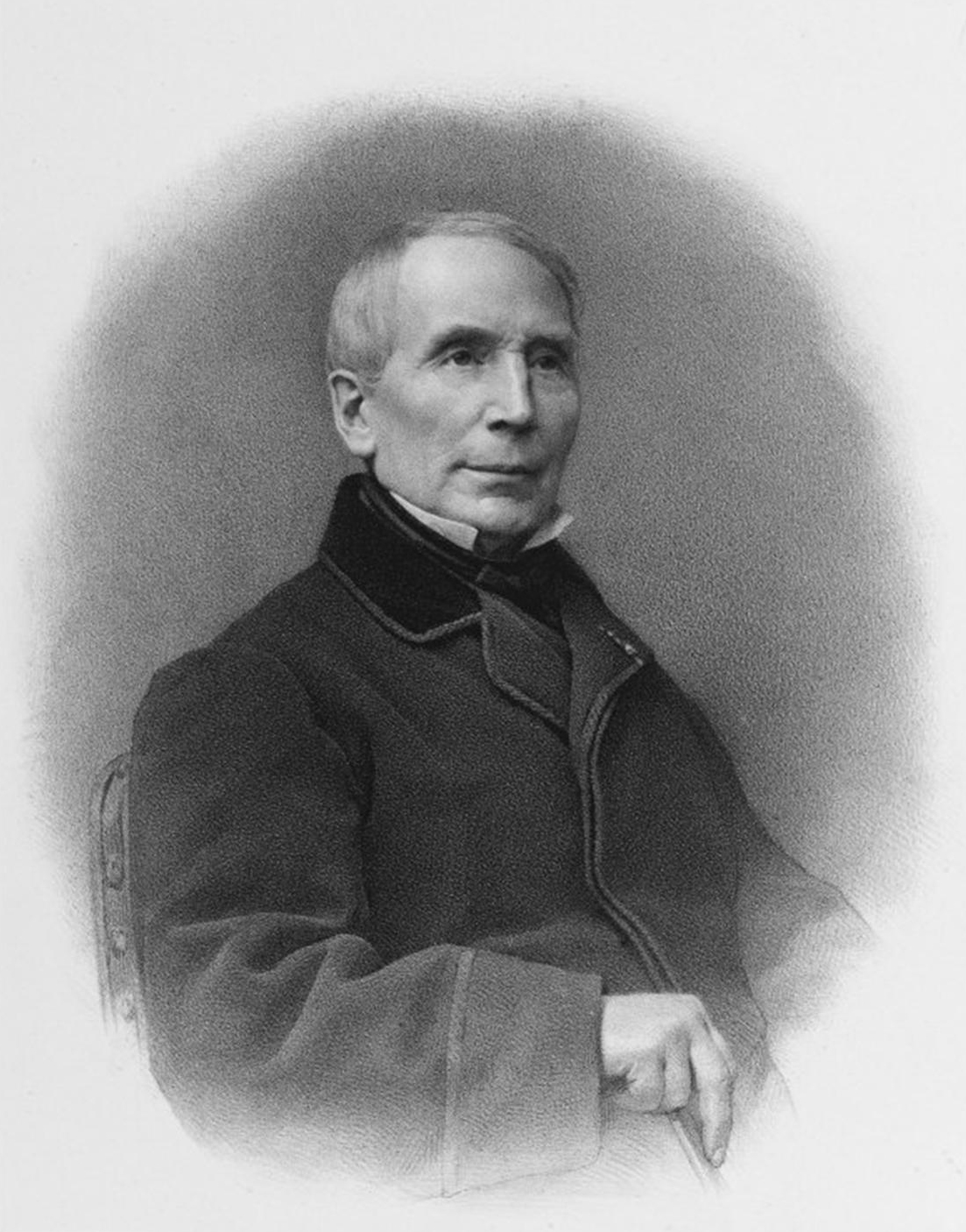
Armand-Pierre Caussin de Perceval

Armand-Pierre Caussin de Perceval (1795–1871) was a French orientalist.

He was born in Paris on 13 January 1795. His father, Jean-Jacques-Antoine Caussin de Perceval (1759–1835), was professor of Arabic in the Collège de France.

In 1814 he went to Constantinople as a student interpreter, and afterwards travelled in Asiatic Turkey, spending a year with the Maronites in the Lebanon, and finally becoming dragoman at Aleppo. Returning to Paris, he became professor of modern Arabic in the School of Living Oriental Languages in 1821, and also professor of Arabic in the Collège de France in 1833. In 1849 he was elected to the Academy of Inscriptions. He died on 15 January 1871 at the Siege of Paris.

Caussin de Perceval published (1828) a useful Grammaire arabe vulgaire, which passed through several editions (4th ed., 1858), and edited and enlarged Ellious Bocthor's Dictionnaire français-arabe (2 vols., 1828; 3rd ed., 1864); but his great reputation rests almost entirely on one book, the Essai sur l'histoire des Arabes avant l'Islamisme, pendant l'époque de Mahomet (3 vols., 1847–1849), in which the native traditions as to the early history of the Arabs, down to the death of Muhammad and the complete subjection of all the tribes to Islam, are brought together with wonderful industry and set forth with much learning and lucidity. One of the principal manuscript sources used is the great Kitab al-Aghani of Abu al-Faraj, which has since been published (20 vols., Boulak, 1868) in Egypt; but no publication of texts can deprive the Essai of its value as a trustworthy guide through a tangled mass of tradition.
