= Imprimerie nationale =

French company

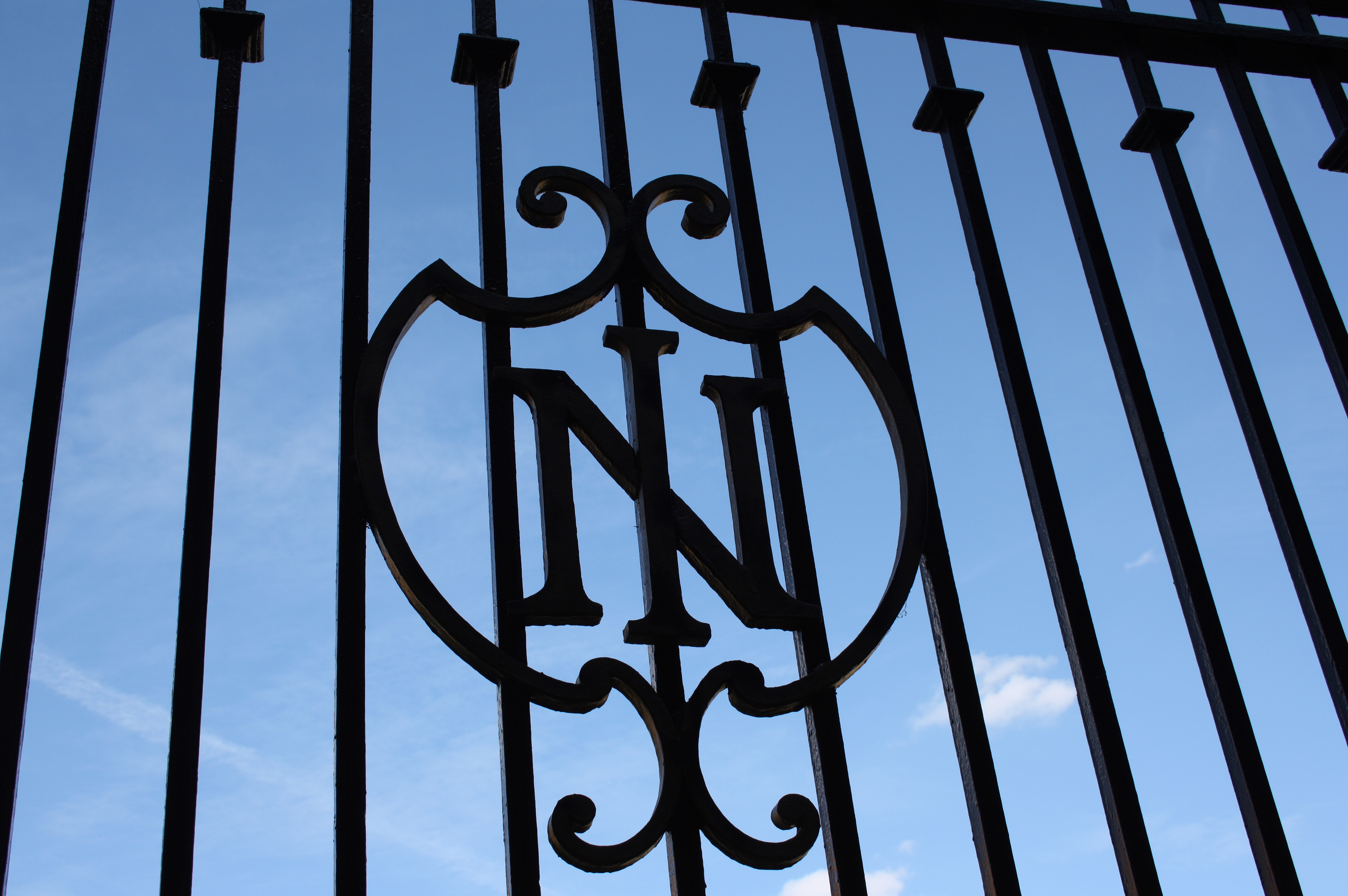
- 'I' and 'N' symbols forged on the gate of the former Imprimerie Nationale rue de la Convention in Paris.
- Formerly: Imprimerie Royale; Imprimerie de la République; Imprimerie Impériale; Imprimerie Nationale
- Founded: 1538
- Founder: Cardinal Richelieu
- Headquarters: Paris, France
- Products: Secure documents (identity cards, passports, ...)
- Revenue: 427,000,000 euro (2020)
- Number of employees: 2,000 (2024)
- Parent: Agence des participations de l'État
- Website: ingroupe.com

The Imprimerie nationale (lit. 'National Printing Office'), currently branded as the IN Groupe, is a government-owned French company that specializes in the production of secure documents such as identity cards and passports, which it designs and sells to various governments and companies.

The history of the Imprimerie Nationale dates back to the printers granted special royal privileges during the French Renaissance. It was partially privatized in 1993, operating with fewer government monopolies, more exposure to competition, and more freedom to chart its own business decisions but with all equity continuing to be held by the French government.

== History ==
Succeeding the "Printer of the King" (Imprimeurs du roi) and "Printers of the King for the Greek Language" (Imprimeurs du roi pour le Grec) named by Francis I in the 1530s and 1540s during the French Renaissance, the "Royal Imprimery" or "Printing Office" (Imprimerie royale) was founded by Louis XIII in 1640 at the instigation of Cardinal Richelieu. Following the French Revolution, it became the "Imprimery of the Republic" (Imprimerie de la République); following the coronation of Napoleon, the "Imperial Imprimery" (Imprimerie impériale); and following the Bourbon Restoration, the "Royal Imprimery" again. Finally, in 1870, the Third Republic settled on its current name, the "National Imprimery" (Imprimerie nationale).

The Imprimerie nationale has long been the exclusive printer for the state, until the law of 1994 which made it a limited company with the state as sole shareholder.

The Imprimerie nationale was also known to retain a unique collection of punches, a printing workshop, and a printing historical library. It possesses also numerous resources for the history of European printing, such as original documents of the Didot family.

The printing firm carries on the official printing works of several nations around the world (130 commercial partners), like Lebanese passports in addition to the French ones.

In the 2010s, the company's strategy was radically changed and oriented towards production of secure documents and provision of distant security solutions. In 2019, traditional printing only accounts for 5% of the group's total income. In September 2022, the Cour des Comptes auditing institution reviewed the IN Group's digital shift and suggested a more aggressive growth through acquisitions to compete with the market's heavyweights.

== Chronology ==
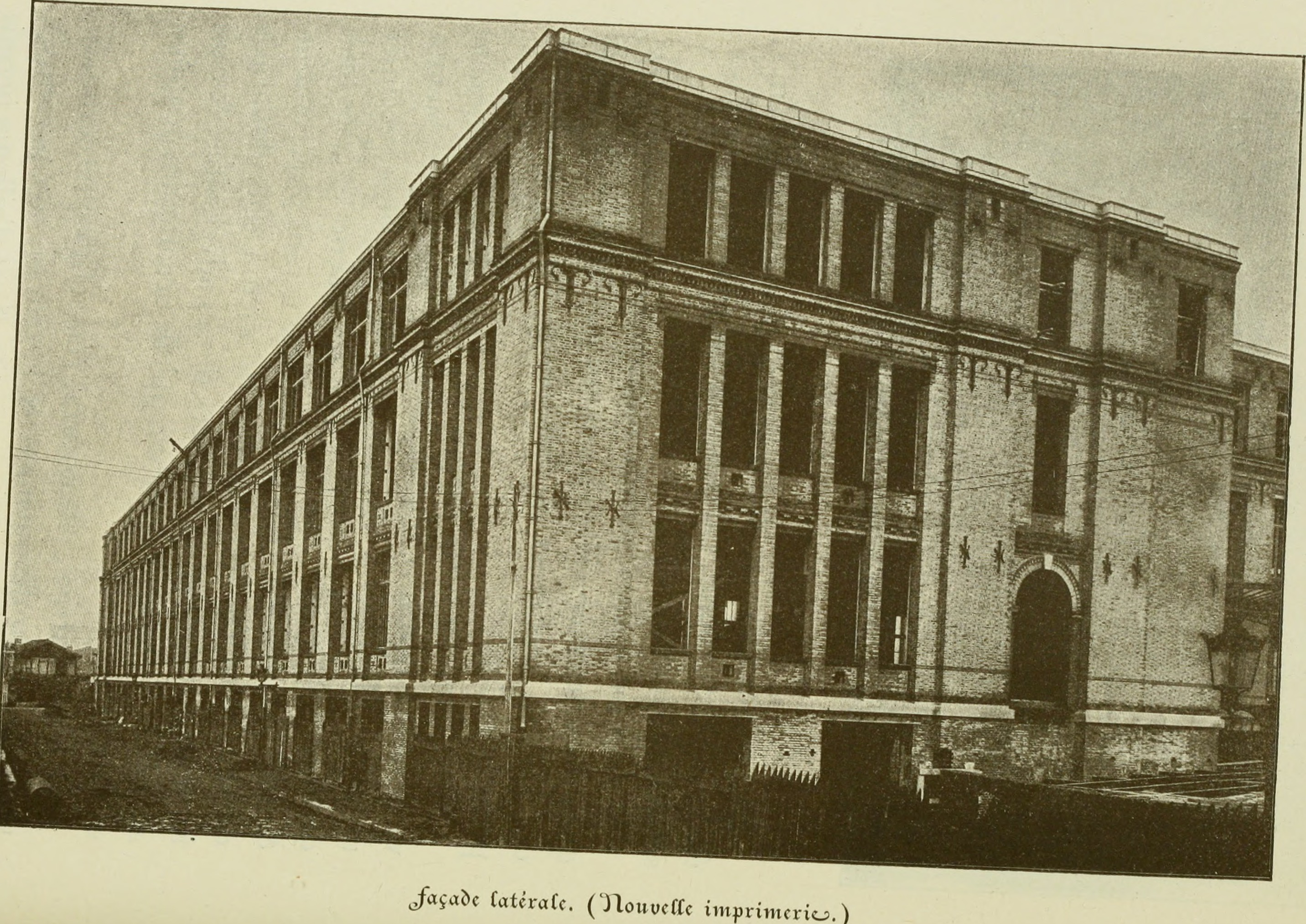
The building under construction in 1905

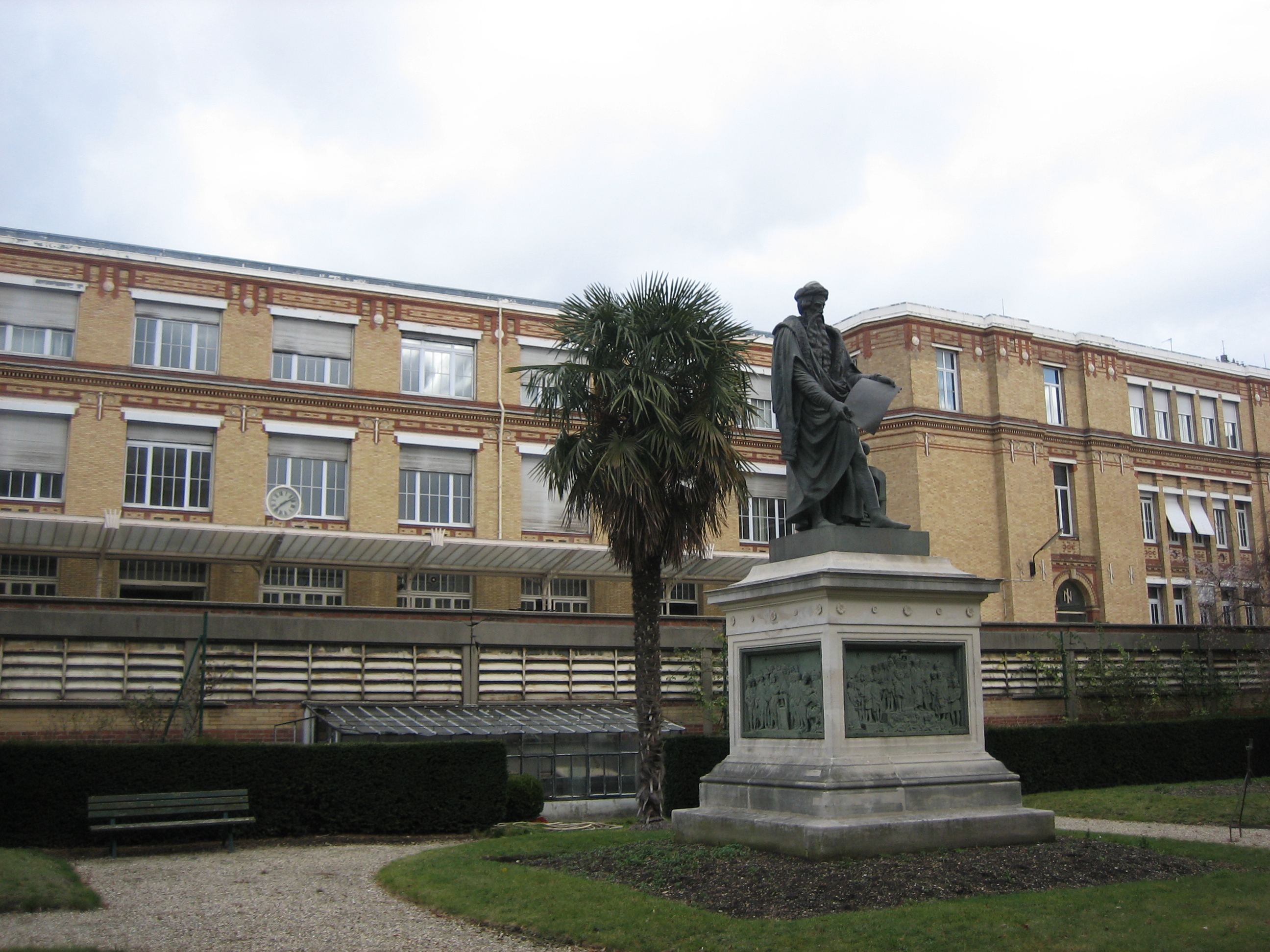
Former site of the Imprimerie nationale on the Rue de la Convention

- 1538 : François I grants Conrad Néobar the title of "imprimeur du Roy" for Greek printing.
- 1540 : Robert Estienne was named "imprimeur du roi pour le grec". Claude Garamond created the typeface "Grecs du roi".
- 1640 : Louis XIII, advised by Richelieu, created the Manufacture royale d'imprimerie in the Louvre Palace.
- 1670 : Jean-Baptiste Colbert began the collection « Le Cabinet du Roi ».
- 1749 : the first volumes of the Histoire naturelle of Buffon were printed.
- 1790 : the Imprimerie royale became the Imprimerie du Louvre.
- 1792 : the Imprimerie nationale executive left the Louvre, where it had been since 1640.
- 1795 : the hôtel de Penthièvre housed two official printing establishments named Imprimerie de la République.
- 1809 : the Imprimerie impériale was installed at the hôtel de Rohan. There were printed the first 23 volumes of the Description de l'Égypte.
- 1813 : publication of the decree authorising the section of oriental compositors.
- 1816 : The imprimery resumes publication of the Journal des Savants, the world's oldest surviving academic journal.
- 1870 : the Imprimerie impériale became once more the Imprimerie nationale, a name which it still bears.
- 1900 : for Ambroise Vollard the Imprimerie nationale printed the first "artist's book". An edition of Paul Verlaine illustrated by Pierre Bonnard was also printed.
- 1903 : the foundation stone of the new works on the plain of Javel.
- 1910 : the Imprimerie nationale was put in the charge of the Minister of Finance.
- 1921 : the Imprimerie nationale occupied the premises at the rue de la Convention.
- 1961 : publication of the decree of 4 December on the organization of the Imprimerie nationale.
- 1974 : the Imprimerie nationale opened its site de Douai.
- 1992 : inauguration of the works at Bondoufle by Michel Charasse, minister of the Budget.
- 1994 : the Imprimerie nationale became Imprimerie nationale SA the whole capital of which was held by the state.
- 1995 : issue of the first CDROM planned by the Imprimerie nationale.
- 1997 : acquisition of the firms Saqqarah International, Istra, and Mizeret and creation of "groupe Imprimerie nationale"; acquisition of the firm IDC.
- 1997 : creation of workshops for production of plastic cards.
- 1998 : installation of a new press, "la presse dix couleurs", on the Paris site.
- 2000 : the group member IDC, specialising in digital printing, became INumeric.
- 2001 : the group member Mizeret became J. Print.
- 2001 : installation of a KBA rotary press, 64 pages of A4 in four colours at Bondoufle.
- 2003 : the Parisian buildings on the Convention site were sold to Groupe Carlyle for 85 million euros, then repurchased in 2007 for 376,5 million euros, for the Ministère des Affaires étrangères. The commercial property were sold to a French editing firm.
- 2005 : the state sold the sites at Bondoufle and Schiltigheim, closed the Parisian rue de la Convention's site, and installed the printing on paper works at Choisy-le-Roi.
- 2006 : the paper division at Choisy-le-Roi was put under the management of IN Choisy.
- 2008 : the paper division and the building at Choisy-le-Roi were given up
- 2000: production of smartcards
- 2002: the Imprimerie Nationale becomes the trusted operator responsible for managing the French tachograph cards.
- 2006: production of electronic passports
- 2008: production of biometric passports
- 2009: production of SIV vehicle registration certificates
- 2011: production of European residence permits
- 2012: production of electronic European driving licenses
- 2017: production of French construction professional identification cards
- 2021: production of French national electronic identity cards
